= Định Thành =

Định Thành Xã Định Thành
- Rural commune
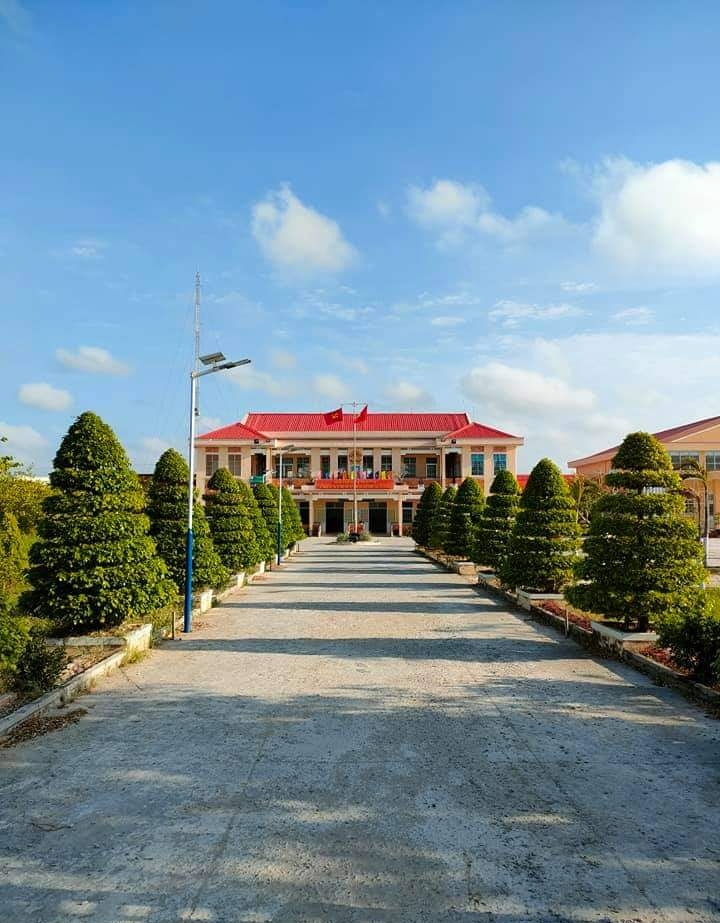
- A local administrative building

- Location in Vietnam
- Country: Vietnam
- Province: Cà Mau
- Establish: June 16, 2025

Area
  - Total: 117.18 km^{2} (45.24 sq mi)

Population 2025
  - Total: 35.564 people
  - Density: 0.30350/km^{2} (0.78606/sq mi)
- Time zone: UTC+07:00 (Indochina Time)

Định Thành is a rural commune (xã) of Cà Mau Province in the Mekong Delta region of Vietnam.

On 16 June 2025, the Standing Committee of the National Assembly issued Resolution No. 1655/NQ-UBTVQH15 on the rearrangement of commune-level administrative units of Cà Mau Province in 2025 (the resolution takes effect from 16 June 2025). Accordingly, the entire natural area of 27.92 km² with a population of 9,103 people of Định Thành A Commune, and the entire natural area of 57.68 km² with a population of 13,405 people of An Phúc Commune, were merged into the entire natural area of 31.58 km² with a population of 13,056 people of Định Thành Commune, Đông Hải District, Bạc Liêu Province.

== Geography ==
Dinh Thanh Commune is situated as follows:

- To the east, it borders An Trạch Commune and Gành Hào Commune.
- To the west, it borders Hòa Thành Ward.
- To the south, it borders Tạ An Khương Commune and Tân Thuận Commune.
- To the north, it borders Phong Thạnh Commune.

Dinh Thanh Commune covers an area of 117.18 km²; as of 2024, it has a population of 35,564 people, resulting in a population density of 0 people/km².

== Administration ==
Dinh Thanh Commune is divided into 17 hamlets: Cai Keo, Cay Gia, Cay The, Choi Moi, Choi Moi A, Hoa Phong, Kinh Xang, Long Phu, Lung Chim, Lung La, Lung Rong, Lung Xinh, Minh Thin, Minh Thin A, Phan Mau, Phuoc Thang, and Phuoc Thang A.

== History ==
On March 6, 1891, the Governor of Cochinchina issued Decree No. 83-ND on the merger of three villages, Binh Thanh, Tan Dinh, and Binh Dinh, into Dinh Thanh village, belonging to Quang Long commune, Ca Mau district, Bac Lieu province.

On October 5, 1917, Dinh Thanh village, Quang Long commune, belonging to Ca Mau district, was separated and transferred to the newly established Gia Rai district.

On March 9, 1956, the Government of the Republic of Vietnam issued Decree No. 32-NV on the establishment of Ca Mau province. Decree No. 32-NV on the merger of Dinh Thanh village, belonging to Gia Rai district, Bạc Liêu province, into the newly established Cà Mau province.

On August 5, 1957, Dinh Thanh commune was established on the basis of the newly dissolved Dinh Thanh and Tan Thanh villages.

After 1957, Dinh Thanh commune, belonging to Quang Long district, separated from Giá Rai district (township) and merged with several communes belonging to Long Thoi district to form Quang Long district in the newly established An Xuyen province.

At that time, Định Thành commune had an area of 1,151 hectares with a population of 10,859 people in 1965 and 25,680 people in 1970.

On September 20, 1975, the Politburo issued Resolution No. 245-NQ/TW Regarding the merger of Bạc Liêu province, Cà Mau province and two districts An Biên district and Vĩnh Thuận district (excluding Đông Yên and Tây Yên communes) of Rạch Giá province into a new province, the name of the new province and the location of the provincial capital will be proposed by the local authorities.

On December 20, 1975, the Politburo issued Resolution No. 19/NQ regarding the merger of Bạc Liêu and Cà Mau provinces into a new province. The name of the new province and the location of the provincial capital will be proposed by the local authorities.

On February 24, 1976, the Provisional Revolutionary Government of the Republic of South Vietnam issued Decree No. 3/NQ/1976 Regarding the merger of Bạc Liêu province and Cà Mau province into a new province, named Bạc Liêu – Cà Mau province. Định Thành commune belongs to Giá Rai district, Bạc Liêu – Cà Mau province.

On March 10, 1976, the Government issued a Resolution establishing Minh Hải province based on renaming Bạc Liêu province – Cà Mau province. At that time, Định Thành commune belonged to Giá Rai district, Minh Hải province.

On July 11, 1977, the Government Council issued Decision No. 181-CP. regarding the merger of Dinh Thanh commune, formerly part of Chau Thanh district, into Gia Rai district.

On April 4, 1979, the Government Council issued Decision No. 142-CP regarding:

- Establishment of An Dinh commune in Gia Rai district based on the separation of Choi Moi hamlet and Cai Keo hamlet from Dinh Thanh commune in Cà Mau district.
- Dividing An Trạch commune (excluding Khúc Tréo hamlet and Nhân Dân hamlet, which were transferred to Phong Thạnh Tây commune) into 5 communes: An Bình, An Hòa, An Hạnh, An Phúc, and An Trạch.

On August 30, 1983, the Council of Ministers issued Decision No. 94-HĐBT. regarding the merger of Dinh Hoa commune and Dinh Thanh commune of Ca Mau district, which had just been dissolved, into Gia Rai district.

On February 14, 1987, the Council of Ministers issued Decision No. 33B-HĐBT Regarding the merger of An Dinh commune into An Phuc commune.

An Phuc commune has 5,446 hectares of land and 7,236 inhabitants.

On April 13, 1991, the Government's Organization and Personnel Committee issued Decision No. 183/QD-TCCP on adjusting the administrative boundaries of some communes in Gia Rai district, Minh Hai province, regarding the merger of Dinh Hoa commune into Dinh Thanh commune.

On November 6, 1996, the National Assembly issued Resolution regarding the division of Minh Hải province into Bạc Liêu province and Cà Mau province. At that time, An Phuc commune and Định Thành commune belonged to Giá Rai district, Bạc Liêu province.

On December 24, 2001, the Government issued Decree No. 98/2001/ND-CP regarding:

- Establishment of Dong Hai District in Bac Lieu Province.
- Transfer of An Phuc Commune and Dinh Thanh Commune from Gia Rai District to the newly established Dong Hai District.

On December 24, 2003, the Government issued Decree No. 166/2003/ND-CP regarding the establishment of Dinh Thanh A commune in Dong Hai district based on 2,986.50 hectares of natural area and 9,410 inhabitants of Dinh Thanh commune.

After the administrative boundary adjustment, Dinh Thanh commune retains 3,010.20 hectares of natural area and 9,510 inhabitants.

As of December 31, 2024:

- An Phuc Commune has 7 hamlets: Cai Keo, Choi Moi, Long Phu, Minh Thin, Minh Thin A, Phuoc Thang, Phuoc Thang A.
- Dinh Thanh Commune has 5 hamlets: Cay Gia, Cay The, Choi Moi, Lung Chim, Lung Xinh.
- Dinh Thanh A Commune has 5 hamlets: Hoa Phong, Lung La, Lung Rong, Kenh Xang, Phan Mau.

On June 12, 2025, the National Assembly issued Resolution No. 202/2025/QH15 Regarding the arrangement of provincial-level administrative units (resolution effective from June 12, 2025). Accordingly, the province of Bạc Liêu will be merged into the province of Cà Mau.

On June 16, 2025, the Standing Committee of the National Assembly issued Resolution No. 1655/NQ-UBTVQH15 regarding the arrangement of commune-level administrative units in Ca Mau province in 2025 (resolution effective from June 16, 2025). Accordingly, the entire 27.92 km² of natural area and a population of 9,103 people of Định Thành A commune and the entire 57.68 km² of natural area and a population of 13,405 people of An Phúc commune are merged into the entire 31.58 km² of natural area and a population of 13,056 people of Định Thành commune in Đông Hải district, Bạc Liêu province.

Dinh Thanh commune has a natural area of 117.18 km² and a population of 35,564 people.
