= An Xuyên =

Ward in Cà Mau province, Vietnam

Coordinates: 9°13′26″N 105°10′32″E

- Ward
- Country: Vietnam
- Province: Cà Mau Province
- Establish: June 16, 2025

Government
  - Secretary of CPV: Hồ Văn Chung
  - Chairman of People's Council: Huỳnh Văn Minh

Area
  - Total: 69.9 km^{2} (27.0 sq mi)

Population
  - Total: 82.039
  - Density: 1.1737/km^{2} (3.040/sq mi)
- Time zone: UTC+7 (UTC+7)
- Area code: 32002
- Website: anxuyen.camau.gov.vn

An Xuyên is a ward in Cà Mau province, Vietnam. This is one of the 64 communes and wards in the province.

== Geography ==
An Xuyên is a ward in Cà Mau province, located 60km west of Bạc Liêu ward, 30km west of Giá Rai ward. It borders with Phong Thạnh commune to the east, Hồ Thị Kỷ commune to the west and northwest, Lý Văn Lâm and Tân Thành ward to the south, Tân Lộc commune to the northeast.

An Xuyên ward covers an area of 69.9 km²; as of 2024, it has a population of 81,303 people, resulting in a population density of approximately 1,163 people/km².

== Administration ==
An Xuyên Ward is divided into 35 neighborhoods: 1, 2, 3, 4, 5, 6, 7, 8, 9, 10, 11, 12, 13, 14, 15, 16, 17, 18, 19, 20, 21, 22, 23, 24, 25, 26, 27, 28, 29, 30, 31, Tân Dân, Tân Hiệp, Tân Thời, and Tân Thuộc.

== History ==
On October 15, 1904, the French Governor of Cochinchina issued a decree establishing the town center of Ca Mau. At that time, An Xuyen village belonged to Ca Mau town.

In June 1956, the Southern Regional Party Committee decided to establish Cà Mau province. At this time, An Xuyen commune belonged to Chau Thanh district.

In 1961, Cà Mau district-level town was established based on the separation of the entire Tân Phước hamlet from An Xuyên commune.

After the year In 1975, An Xuyen commune belonged to Châu Thành district, Cà Mau province.

On September 20, 1975, the Politburo issued Resolution No. 245-NQ/TW on the merger of provinces. Bạc Liêu, Cà Mau province and two districts Vĩnh Thuận, An Biên (excluding Đông Yên and Tây Yên communes) of Rạch Giá province will merge into one province. The name of the new province and the location of the provincial capital will be proposed by the local authorities.

On December 20, 1975, the Politburo issued Resolution No. 19/NQ on the merging of several provinces in the South. on the merging of provinces Bạc Liêu and Cà Mau province will be merged into one province. The name of the new province and the location of the provincial capital will be proposed by the local authorities.

On February 24, 1976, the Provisional Revolutionary Government of the Republic of South Vietnam issued Decree No. 3/NQ/1976. regarding the merger of Bạc Liêu province and Cà Mau province into a new province, named Bạc Liêu – Cà Mau province.

On March 10, 1976, the Government issued a Resolution regarding the establishment of Minh Hải province on the basis of renaming Bạc Liêu – Cà Mau province.

On July 11, 1977, the Government Council issued Decision No. 181-CP regarding the merger of An Xuyen commune, formerly part of Chau Thanh district, into Thới Bình district.

On December 29, 1978, the Government Council issued Decision No. 326-CP regarding the demarcation of the boundaries of districts and towns in Minh Hai province issued by the Government Council. concerning the transfer of An Xuyen commune from Thới Bình district to Cà Mau district newly established management.

On July 25, 1979, the Government Council issued Decision No. 275-CP concerning the division of An Xuyen commune in Cà Mau district into An Xuyen and An Loc communes.

On August 30, 1983, the Council of Ministers issued Decision No. 94-HĐBT regarding the merger of An Xuyen and An Loc communes of the newly dissolved Cà Mau into Cà Mau.

On February 14, 1987, the Council of Ministers issued Decision No. 33B-HDBT regarding:

- Merging Ward 3 of Cà Mau town (Cà Mau city) into Ward 2.
- Merging An Lộc commune of Cà Mau town (Cà Mau city) into An Xuyên commune.

After the administrative boundary adjustment:

- Ward 2 has 7,264 inhabitants.
- An Xuyên commune has 4,118 hectares of land and 13,045 inhabitants.

On November 6, 1996, the National Assembly issued Resolution on the division of provinces. Minh Hải becomes Bạc Liêu province and Cà Mau province.

On April 14, 1999, the Government issued Decree No. 21/1999/ND-CP regarding the establishment of the city of Cà Mau in the province of Cà Mau.

On June 4, 2009, the Government issued Resolution No. 24/NQ-CP regarding the establishment of Tân Xuyên Ward in Cà Mau City based on the adjustment of 1,887.50 hectares of natural area and 6,261 inhabitants of An Xuyên Commune.

On October 24, 2024, the Standing Committee of the National Assembly issued Resolution No. 1252/NQ-UBTVQH15 regarding the rearrangement of commune-level administrative units in Ca Mau province for the period 2023 – 2025 (resolution effective from December 1, 2024). Accordingly:

- Merge 1.61 km² of natural area and a population of 12,614 people from Ward 4 and adjust 0.57 km² of natural area and a population of 4,116 people from Ward 9 into Ward 2 of Ca Ca Mau City.
- Merge the remaining 0.27 km² of natural area and a population of 146 people from Ward 4 into Tan Xuyen Ward of Cà Mau City.

On June 12, 2025, the National Assembly issued Resolution No. 202/2025/QH15 Regarding the reorganization of provincial-level administrative units (resolution effective from June 12, 2025). Accordingly, the province of Bạc Liêu will be merged into the province of Cà Mau.

June 16, 2025:

- The National Assembly issued Resolution No. 203/2025/QH15 regarding the amendment and supplementation of certain articles of the Constitution of the Socialist Republic of Vietnam. Accordingly, the operation of district-level administrative units nationwide will end from July 1, 2025.
- The Standing Committee of the National Assembly issued Resolution No. 1655/NQ-UBTVQH15 regarding the arrangement of commune-level administrative units of Cà Mau province in 2025 (resolution effective from June 16, 2025). Accordingly, An Xuyên ward is established in Cà Mau province based on the entire 3.7 km² natural area, with a population of 16,081 people. Ward 1; The entire 2.4 km² natural area and population of 21,785 people of Ward 2; the entire 6.5 km² natural area and population of 16,515 people of Ward 9; the entire 20.7 km² natural area and population of 10,103 people of Tân Xuyên Ward; and the entire 36.6 km² natural area and population of 16,819 people of An Xuyên Commune, all belonging to Cà Mau City.

An Xuyên Ward has a natural area of 69.9 km² and a population of 81,303 people.
