= Phong Thạnh, Cà Mau =

Phong Thạnh
- Commune and village
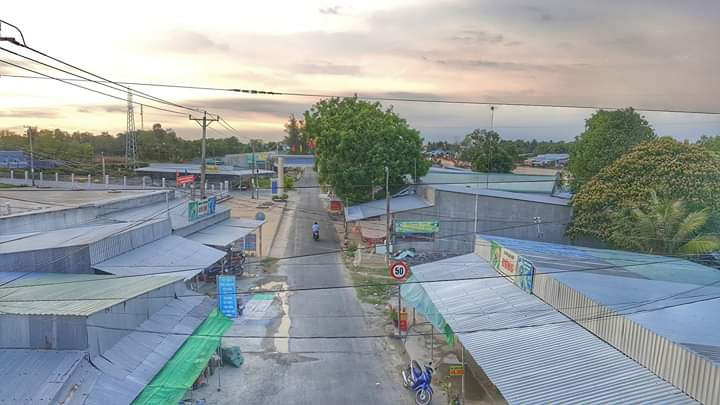
- Xã Phong Thạnh Tây

- Location in Vietnam
- Coordinates: 9.2622°N 105.3136°E
- Country: Vietnam
- Province: Cà Mau Province
- Establish: June 16, 2025

Area
  - Total: 142.96 km^{2} (55.20 sq mi)

Population 2025
  - Total: 53.912 people
  - Density: 0.37711/km^{2} (0.97672/sq mi)
- Time zone: UTC+7 (UTC+7)

Phong Thạnh is a commune (xã) and village in Cà Mau Province, in south-western Vietnam.

The Standing Committee of the National Assembly issued Resolution No. 1655/NQ-UBTVQH15 on the rearrangement of commune-level administrative units of Cà Mau Province in 2025 (the resolution takes effect from 1 July 2025). Accordingly, Phong Thạnh Commune was established in Cà Mau Province on the basis of the entire 27.08 km² of natural area and a population of 11,110 people of Tân Thạnh Commune, the entire 53.04 km² of natural area and a population of 11,744 people of Phong Thạnh Tây Commune, and the entire 62.84 km² of natural area and a population of 31,058 people of Tân Phong Commune, all formerly belonging to Giá Rai Town, Bạc Liêu Province.

== Geography ==
Phong Thạnh Commune is geographically situated as follows:

- To the east, it borders Giá Rai Ward.
- To the west, it borders An Xuyên Ward.
- To the south, it borders An Trạch Commune and Định Thành Commune.
- To the north, it borders Phong Hiệp Commune and Tân Lộc Commune.

Phong Thạnh Commune has an area of 142.96 km² and a population of 53,912 in 2024, with a population density of 377 people/km².

== Administration divisions ==
Phong Thạnh Commune is divided into 23 hamlets: 1, 1A, 2, 2A, 3, 3A, 3B, 4, 5, 6, 7, 8, 9, 10, 10A, 10B, Gò Muồng, Khúc Tréo A, Khúc Tréo B, Kinh Lớn, Nhàn Dân A, Nhàn Dân B, and Xóm Mới.

== History ==
On September 20, 1975, the Politburo issued Resolution No. 245-NQ/TW regarding the merger of Bạc Liêu province, Cà Mau province and two districts An Biên district and Vĩnh Thuận district (excluding Đông Yên and Tây Yên communes) of Rạch Giá province into a new province. The name of the new province and the location of the provincial capital will be proposed by the local authorities.

On December 20, 1975, the Politburo issued Resolution No. 19/NQ Regarding the merger of Bac Lieu and Cà Mau provinces into a new province, the name of the new province and the location of the provincial capital will be proposed by the local authorities.

On February 24, 1976, the Provisional Revolutionary Government of the Republic of South Vietnam issued Decree No. 3/NQ/1976 regarding the merger of Bạc Liêu province and Cà Mau province into a new province, named Bạc Liêu – Cà Mau province. At that time, Phong Thạnh Tây commune belonged to Giá Rai district, Bạc Liêu – Cà Mau province.

On March 10, 1976, the Government issued a Resolution regarding the establishment of Minh Hải province on the basis of renaming Bạc Liêu province to Cà Mau province. At that time, Phong Thạnh Tây commune belonged to Giá Rai district (township) in Minh Hải province.

On April 4, 1979, the Government Council issued Decision No. 142-CP. Regarding the division of Phong Thạnh Tây commune along with Khúc Tréo and Nhân Dân hamlets of An Trạch commune into 4 communes: Phong Thạnh Tây, Tân Hiệp, Tân Hòa, and Tân Phong, transferred to Giá Rai district.

On July 25, 1979, the Government Council issued Decision No. 275-CP. Regarding the division of Tân Thành commune in Giá Rai district into 3 communes: Tân Định, Tân Thành, and Tân Thạnh.

On August 30, 1983, the Council of Ministers issued Decision No. 94-HĐBT regarding the merger of Tân Thạnh commune of Cà Mau into Giá Rai district.

On April 13, 1991, the Government's Organization and Personnel Committee issued Decision No. 183/QD-TCCP regarding:

- Merging Tân Hiệp commune and Thạnh Bình commune of Giá Rai into Tân Phong commune.
- Merging Tân Hòa commune of Giá Rai into Phong Thạnh Tây commune.

On November 6, 1996, the National Assembly issued Resolution regarding the division of Minh Hải province into Bạc Liêu province and Cà Mau province. At that time, Phong Thạnh Tây, Tân Phong, and Tân Thạnh communes belonged to Giá Rai district, Bạc Liêu province.

On December 24, 2001, the Government issued Decree No. 98/2001/ND-CP regarding the establishment of Đông Hải district in Bạc Liêu province on the basis of part of Giá Rai district. At that time, Phong Thạnh Tây, Tân Phong, and Tân Thạnh communes belonged to Giá Rai district.

On May 15, 2015, the Standing Committee of the National Assembly issued Resolution No. 930/NQ-UBTVQH13 regarding the establishment of Giá Rai town in Bạc Liêu province on the basis of the entire Giá Rai district. The communes of Phong Thạnh Tây, Tân Phong, and Tân Thạnh are under the jurisdiction of Giá Rai.

As of December 31, 2024:

- Phong Thạnh Tây Commune has 7 hamlets: 1, 2, 3, 4, 5, 6, 7.
- Tân Phong Commune has 11 hamlets: 1, 2, 3, 3B, 10, 10A, 10B, Khúc Tréo A, Khúc Tréo B, Nhân Dân A, Nhân Dân B.
- Tạn Thạnh Commune has 5 hamlets: 8, 9, Gò Muồng, Kinh Lớn, Xóm Mới.

On June 12, 2025, the National Assembly issued Resolution No. 202/2025/QH15 on the rearrangement of provincial-level administrative units (the resolution takes effect from June 12, 2025). Accordingly, the province of Bạc Liêu will be merged into the province of Cà Mau.

June 16, 2025:

- The National Assembly issued Resolution No. 203/2025/QH15 regarding the amendment and supplementation of some articles of the Constitution of the Socialist Republic of Vietnam. Accordingly, the operation of district-level administrative units nationwide will end from July 1, 2025.
- The Standing Committee of the National Assembly issued Resolution No. 1655/NQ-UBTVQH15 regarding the arrangement of commune-level administrative units of Cà Mau province in 2025 (resolution effective from July 1, 2025). Accordingly, Phong Thạnh commune is established in Cà Mau province based on the entire 27.08 km² natural area and a population of 11,110 people of Tân Thạnh commune; The entire 53.04 km² natural area and a population of 11,744 people of Phong Thạnh Tây commune and the entire 62.84 km² natural area and a population of 31,058 people of Tân Phong commune, belonging to Giá Rai town, Bạc Liêu province.

Phong Thạnh commune has a natural area of 142.96 km² and a population of 53,912 people.

== Gallery ==
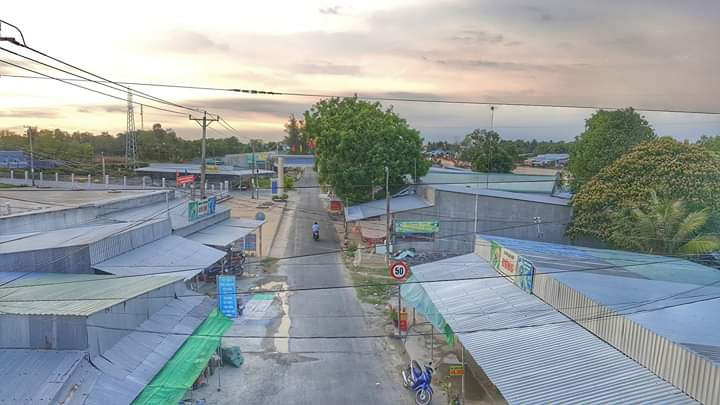
A corner of Phong Thạnh Tây

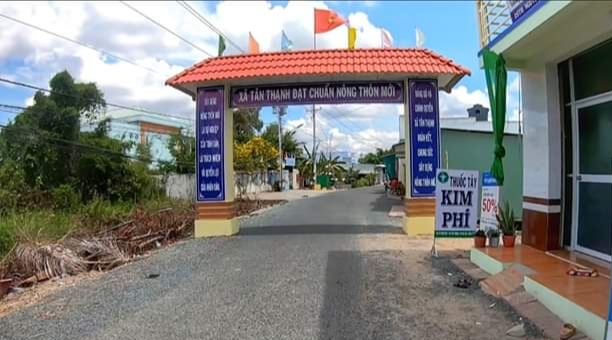
Tân Thạnh Welcome Gate
