= Tân Thành, Cà Mau =

Ward and capital of Cà Mau province, Vietnam

Tân Thành
- Ward
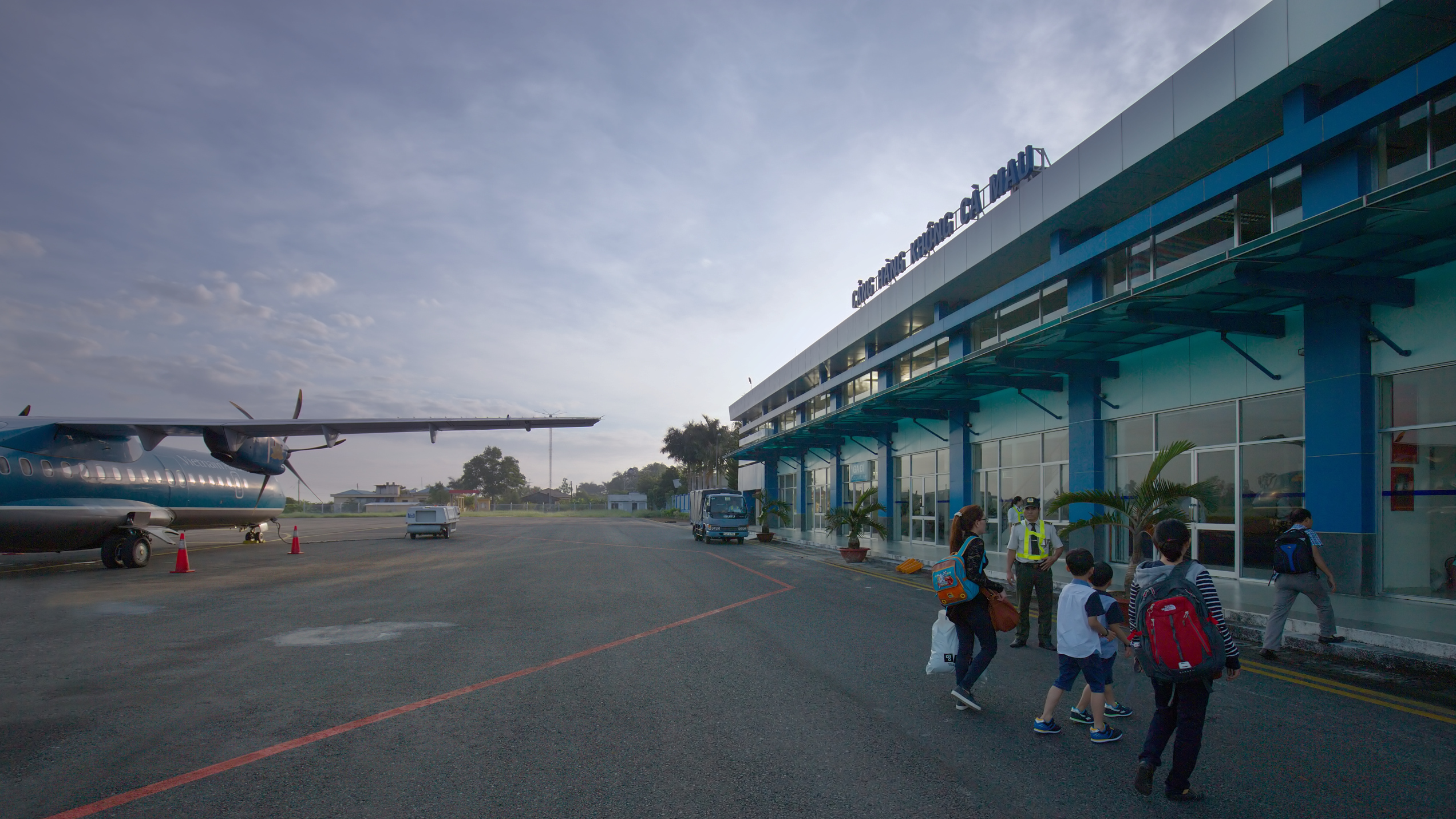
- Cà Mau Airport

- Location within Vietnam
- Country: Vietnam
- Province: Cà Mau Province

Government
  - Secretary of CPV: Trương Đăng Khoa
  - Chairman of People's Council: Võ Minh Tân

Area
  - Total: 19.31 sq mi (50.01 km^{2})

Population
  - Total: 83.934
  - Density: 4.347/sq mi (1.6783/km^{2})
- Time zone: UTC+7 (UTC+7)
- Administrative code: 32025
- Website: tanthanh.camau.gov.vn

Tân Thành (Phường Tân Thành) is a ward and the provincial center of Cà Mau Province in the Mekong Delta region of Vietnam.

== Geography ==
- To the east, it borders Phong Thạnh.
- To the west, it borders Lý Văn Lâm.
- To the south, it borders Hòa Thành.
- To the north, it borders An Xuyên.

The ward has an area of 48.42 km², the population in 2024 is 83,758 people, and the population density is 1,729 people/km².

== Administration ==
Tân Thành is divided into 35 hamlets: 1, 2, 3, 4, 5, 6, 7, 8, 9, 10, 11, 12, 13, 14, 15, 16, 17, 18, 19, 20, 21, 22, 23, 24, 25, 26, 27, 28, 29, 30, 31, 32, Bình Định, Cây Trâm, Cây Trâm A.
