= Thới Bình (disambiguation) =

Thới Bình may refer to several places in Vietnam, including:

- Thới Bình, Cà Mau a commune of Cà Mau province
- Thới Bình district, a former rural district of Cà Mau province
- Thới Bình, Cần Thơ, a former ward of Ninh Kiều district
