= Cà Mau (disambiguation) =

Cà Mau is a province in southern Vietnam and southernmost point of Vietnam.

Cà Mau may also refer to:

- Cà Mau (city), former provincial city of Cà Mau province
- Cà Mau Peninsula
- Ca Mau Airport
