= Trí Phải =

- Commune and village
- Location in Vietnam
- Coordinates: 9°24′21.5″N 105°09′02.4″E
- Country: Vietnam
- Province: Cà Mau
- District: Thới Bình

Area
  - Total: 14.9 sq mi (38.7 km^{2})

Population (2009)
  - Total: 11,894
- Time zone: UTC+07:00

Trí Phải is a commune (xã) and village in Thới Bình district, Cà Mau province, in southern Vietnam. The village centre is approximately 34 kilometres (21 mi) by road north of Cà Mau, and lies at the crossroads of the National Route 63 and Route 981 and two canals, connected to the Trẹm River.

== History ==
In 1987 it was reported that the communes of Trí Phải Tây and Trí Phải Trung merged. At the time the commune of Trí Phải Tây had a population of 4,140 people and covered an area of 4,339 hectares.

As of 2009 the area was 38.7 km^{2} and the population was 11,894, with a density of 307.4/km^{2}. The age breakdown was

- 0–14 years: 2,930
- 15–64 years: 8,290
- 65+ years: 680

== Administrative divisions ==
The commune is divided administratively into the following subcommunes:

- Trí Phải Tây
- Trí Phải Trung
- Trí Phải Đông
- Trí Phải

== Landmarks ==
Trí Phải contains the adjacent churches Nhà thờ Huyện Sử and Nhà Thờ Trí Phải.
