= Dinh Thanh =

Dinh Thanh may refer to:

- Định Thành, An Giang, a rural commune in Vietnam
- Định Thành, Bạc Liêu, a rural commune in Vietnam

== See also ==
- Định Thành A, a rural commune in Vietnam
- Đinh Thanh Bình, Vietnamese football player
- Đinh Thanh Trung, Vietnamese football player
- Đinh Thanh Tâm, AKA Tam Dinh, Vietnamese-American basketball player
