= Bạc Liêu =

Ward of Cà Mau province

- Ward
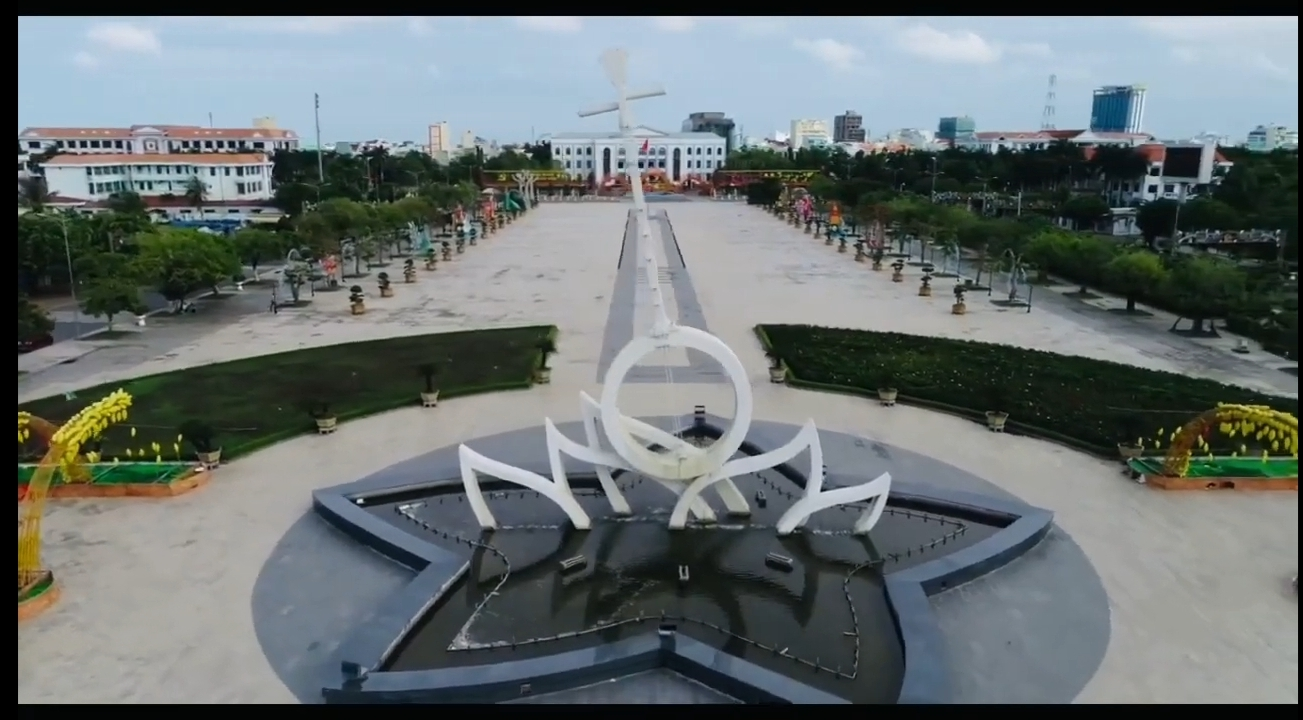
- Country: Vietnam
- Province: Cà Mau Province

Government
  - Secretary of CPV: Tô Việt Thu
  - Chairman of People's Council: Lê Việt Xô

Area
  - Total: 11.48 sq mi (29.73 km^{2})

Population
  - Total: 94.402
  - Density: 8,220/sq mi (3,175/km^{2})
- Time zone: UTC+7 (UTC+7)
- Area code: 31825
- Website: baclieu.camau.gov.vn

Bạc Liêu (Phường Bạc Liêu) is a ward (phường) of Cà Mau Province in the Mekong Delta region of Vietnam.

The ward borders Hiệp Thành ward in the southeast, Vĩnh Hậu in the southwest, Hòa Bình in the northwest, Vĩnh Lợi in the north, Hưng Hội in the northeast, Vĩnh Trạch ward in the east.

== Administrative Divisions ==
The ward is divided into 35 residental divisions: 1, 2, 3, 4, 5, 6, 7, 8, 9, 10, 11, 12, 13, 14, 15, 16, 17, 18, 19, 20, 21, 22, 23, 24, 25, 26, 27, 28, 29, 30, 31, Cầu Sập, Trà Kha, Trà Kha B, Trà Khứa.

== History ==
After the fall of South Vietnam, Bạc Liêu town consisted of 6 wards: 1, 2, 3, 4, 7, 8.

On 10th March 1976, Bạc Liêu province was integrated into Cà Mau province to form the Minh Hải Province and Bạc Liêu town was renamed Minh Hải town as its capital.

On 17th May 1984, Council of Ministers passed the Resolution No. 75-HĐBT on renaming Minh Hải town back to Bạc Liêu and moving the capital of the province to Cà Mau town.

On 2 February 1991, following the Resolution No. 51/QĐ-TCCP annexing ward 1 into ward 3 and ward 8, incorporating ward 4 into ward 7.

On 6th November 1996, Minh Hải province dissolves, Bạc Liêu town became the capital of the Bạc Liêu Province and consisted of wards 2, 3, 7 and 8.

On 13th May 2002, ward 1 reestablished as a separation from ward 7 after the passing of Resolution No. 55/2002/NĐ-CP.

On 27th August 2010, Resolution No. 32/NQ-CP was issued and Bạc Liêu city was created.

The Standing Committee of the National Assembly issued Resolution No. 1655/NQ-UBTVQH15 on the rearrangement of commune-level administrative units of Cà Mau Province in 2025 (the resolution takes effect from 16 June 2025). Accordingly, Bạc Liêu Ward was established in Cà Mau Province on the basis of the entire 5.98 km² of natural area and a population of 24,456 people of Ward 1, the entire 8.83 km² of natural area and a population of 15,735 people of Ward 2, the entire 6.19 km² of natural area and a population of 23,049 people of Ward 3, the entire 2.96 km² of natural area and a population of 20,506 people of Ward 7, and the entire 5.77 km² of natural area and a population of 9,717 people of Ward 8, all formerly belonging to Bạc Liêu City, Bạc Liêu Province.
