= Đá Bạc =

Coordinates: 9.1736°N 104.8572°E

- Commune and village
- Country: Vietnam
- Province: Cà Mau
- Time zone: UTC+07:00

Đá Bạc is a commune (xã) and village in Cà Mau province, in Vietnam.

The Standing Committee of the National Assembly issued Resolution No. 1655/NQ-UBTVQH15 on the rearrangement of commune-level administrative units of Cà Mau Province in 2025 (the resolution takes effect from 16 June 2025). Accordingly, Đá Bạc Commune was established in Cà Mau Province on the basis of the entire natural area of 51.20 km² and a population of 19,357 people of Khánh Bình Tây Commune (including Hòn Đá Bạc); the entire natural area of 95.60 km² and a population of 20,330 people of Khánh Bình Tây Bắc Commune; and the adjustment of 65.10 km² in natural area with a population of 7,382 people from Trần Hợi Commune, all belonging to Trần Văn Thời District.
