= Tân Trung =

Tân Trung may refer to several rural communes in Vietnam, including:

- Tân Trung, Tiền Giang, a commune of Gò Công City
- Tân Trung, Cà Mau, a commune of Đầm Dơi District
- Tân Trung, Bến Tre, a commune of Mỏ Cày Nam District
- Tân Trung, An Giang, a commune of Phú Tân District, An Giang
- Tân Trung, Bắc Giang, a commune of Tân Yên District
