= Quách Phẩm =

Coordinates: 8.8781°N 105.0914°E

- Commune and village
- Interactive map of Quách Phẩm
- Country: Vietnam
- Province: Cà Mau
- Time zone: UTC+07:00

Quách Phẩm is a commune (xã) and village in Cà Mau province, in Vietnam.

The Standing Committee of the National Assembly issued Resolution No. 1655/NQ-UBTVQH15 on the rearrangement of commune-level administrative units of Cà Mau Province in 2025 (the resolution takes effect from 16 June 2025). Accordingly, Quách Phẩm Commune was established in Cà Mau Province on the basis of the entire natural area of 36.30 km² and a population of 15,019 people of Quách Phẩm Bắc Commune, and the entire natural area of 37.50 km² and a population of 13,825 people of Quách Phẩm Commune, both belonging to Đầm Dơi District.
