= Tân Tiến =

Tân Tiến may refer to:

- Tân Tiến, Bắc Giang, Vietnam
- Tân Tiến, Bắc Kạn, Vietnam
- Tân Tiến, Bình Phước, capital of Bù Đốp District
- Tân Tiến, Cà Mau, Vietnam
- Tân Tiến, Biên Hòa, a ward in Đồng Nai province
