= Sông Đốc =

Coordinates: 9°02′N 104°49′E

- Ward
- Interactive map of Sông Đốc
- Country: Vietnam
- Province: Cà Mau

Area
  - Total: 10.6 sq mi (27.4 km^{2})

Population (2017)
  - Total: 49,000
  - Density: 4,600/sq mi (1,800/km^{2})
- Time zone: UTC+07:00

Sông Đốc is a ward (phường) in Cà Mau province, in Vietnam.

The Standing Committee of the National Assembly issued Resolution No. 1655/NQ-UBTVQH15 on the rearrangement of commune-level administrative units of Cà Mau Province in 2025 (the resolution takes effect from 16 June 2025). Accordingly, Sông Đốc Commune was established in Cà Mau Province on the basis of the entire natural area of 28.9 km² and a population of 34,514 people of Sông Đốc Township (including the Hòn Chuối island cluster), and the adjustment of 17.15 km² in natural area with a population of 4,755 people from Phong Điền Commune, Trần Văn Thời District.
