= Tân Thuận, Cà Mau =

Tân Thuận
- Commune and village
- Interactive map of Tân Thuận
- Country: Vietnam
- Province: Cà Mau
- Time zone: UTC+07:00

Tân Thuận is a commune (xã) and village in Cà Mau province, in Vietnam.

The Standing Committee of the National Assembly issued Resolution No. 1655/NQ-UBTVQH15 on the rearrangement of commune-level administrative units of Cà Mau Province in 2025 (the resolution takes effect from 16 June 2025). Accordingly, Tân Thuận Commune was established in Cà Mau Province on the basis of the entire natural area of 63.00 km² and a population of 16,018 people of Tân Đức Commune, and the entire natural area of 106.80 km² and a population of 19,455 people of Tân Thuận Commune, both belonging to Đầm Dơi District.
