= Đầm Dơi =

- Ward
- Location in Vietnam
- Coordinates: 8°59′37″N 105°11′55″E
- Country: Vietnam
- Province: Cà Mau
- Time zone: UTC+07:00

Đầm Dơi is a ward (phường) of Cà Mau province, in Vietnam.

On 16 June 2025, the Standing Committee of the National Assembly issued Resolution No. 1655/NQ-UBTVQH15 on the rearrangement of commune-level administrative units of Cà Mau Province in 2025 (the resolution takes effect from 16 June 2025). Accordingly, Đầm Dơi Commune was established in Cà Mau Province on the basis of the entire natural area of 10.6 km² and a population of 11,133 people of Đầm Dơi Township; the entire natural area of 52.4 km² and a population of 19,311 people of Tân Duyệt Commune; the entire natural area of 32.3 km² and a population of 7,365 people of Tân Dân Commune; and the adjustment of 0.9 km² in natural area with a population of 297 people from Tạ An Khương Commune, all belonging to Đầm Dơi District.
