= Tạ An Khương, Cà Mau =

Coordinates: 9.05728°N 105.19938°E

Tạ An Khương
- Commune and village
- Interactive map of Tạ An Khương
- Country: Vietnam
- Province: Cà Mau
- Time zone: UTC+07:00

Tạ An Khương is a commune (xã) and village in Cà Mau province, in Vietnam.

The Standing Committee of the National Assembly issued Resolution No. 1655/NQ-UBTVQH15 on the rearrangement of commune-level administrative units of Cà Mau Province in 2025 (the resolution takes effect from 16 June 2025). Accordingly, Tạ An Khương Commune was established in Cà Mau Province on the basis of the entire natural area of 36.40 km² and a population of 11,111 people of Tạ An Khương Đông Commune; the entire natural area of 31.00 km² and a population of 9,610 people of Tạ An Khương Nam Commune; and the entire natural area of 38.60 km² with a population of 12,458 people of Tạ An Khương Commune, all belonging to Đầm Dơi District.
