= Trẹm River =

River in Vietnam

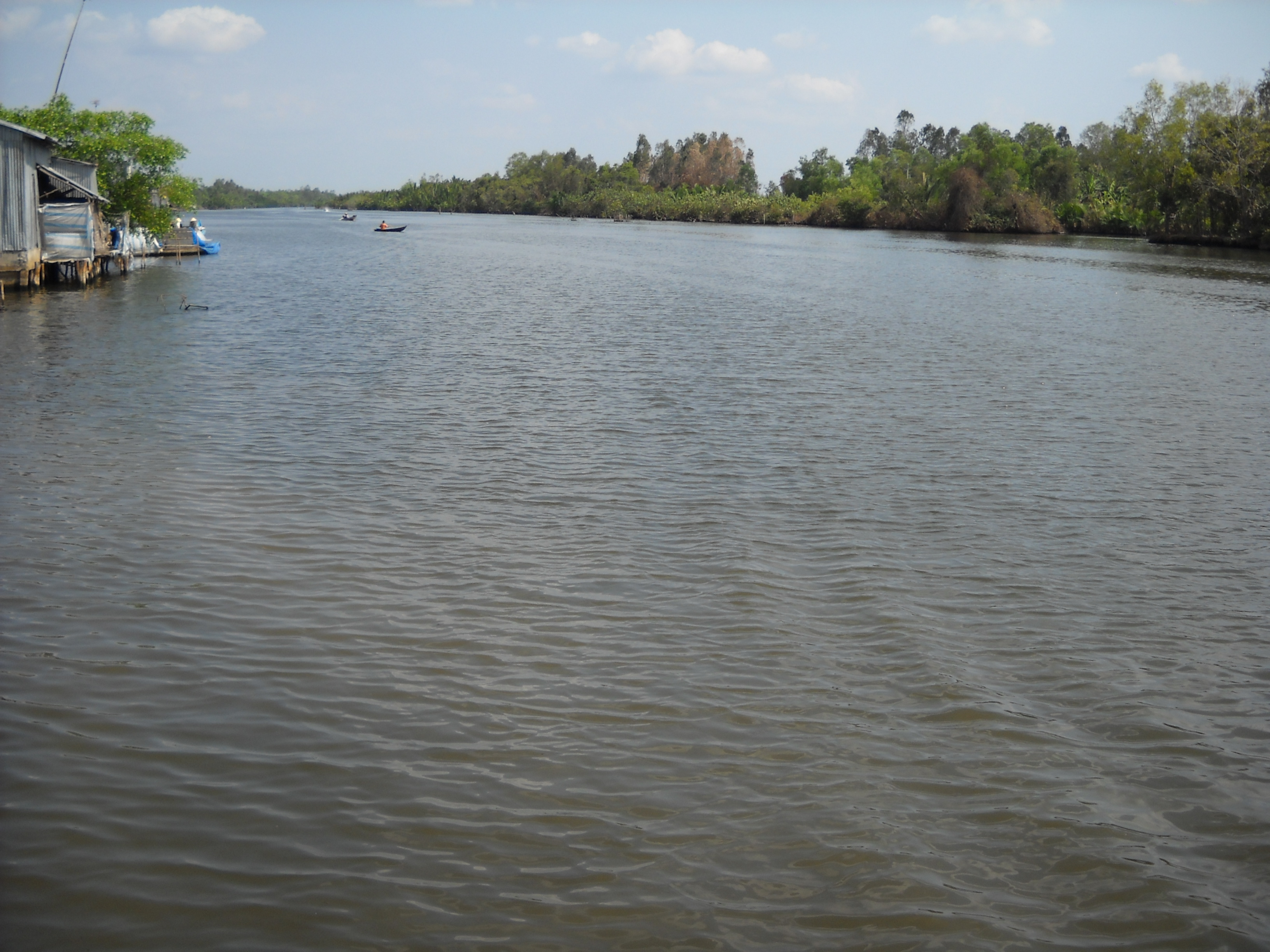
Trẹm River, section through Thới Bình, Cà Mau

The Trẹm River (Vietnamese: Sông Trẹm) is a river of Vietnam. It flows through Cà Mau province and Kiên Giang province for 42 kilometres and is a tributary of the Ông Đốc River.
