= Thanh Tùng, Cà Mau =

Coordinates: 8°52′N 105°10′E

Thanh Tùng (commune)
- Rural commune and village
- Interactive map of Thanh Tùng (commune)
- Country: Vietnam
- Province: Cà Mau
- Time zone: UTC+07:00

Thanh Tùng (commune) is a rural commune (xã) and village in Cà Mau province, in Vietnam.

The Standing Committee of the National Assembly issued Resolution No. 1655/NQ-UBTVQH15 on the rearrangement of commune-level administrative units of Cà Mau Province in 2025 (the resolution takes effect from 16 June 2025). Accordingly, Thanh Tùng Commune was established in Cà Mau Province on the basis of the entire natural area of 42.30 km² and a population of 14,004 people of Ngọc Chánh Commune, and the entire natural area of 47.60 km² and a population of 12,569 people of Thanh Tùng Commune, both belonging to Đầm Dơi District.
