= Gành Hào river =

River in Vietnam

Coordinates: 9°01′16″N 105°24′56″E

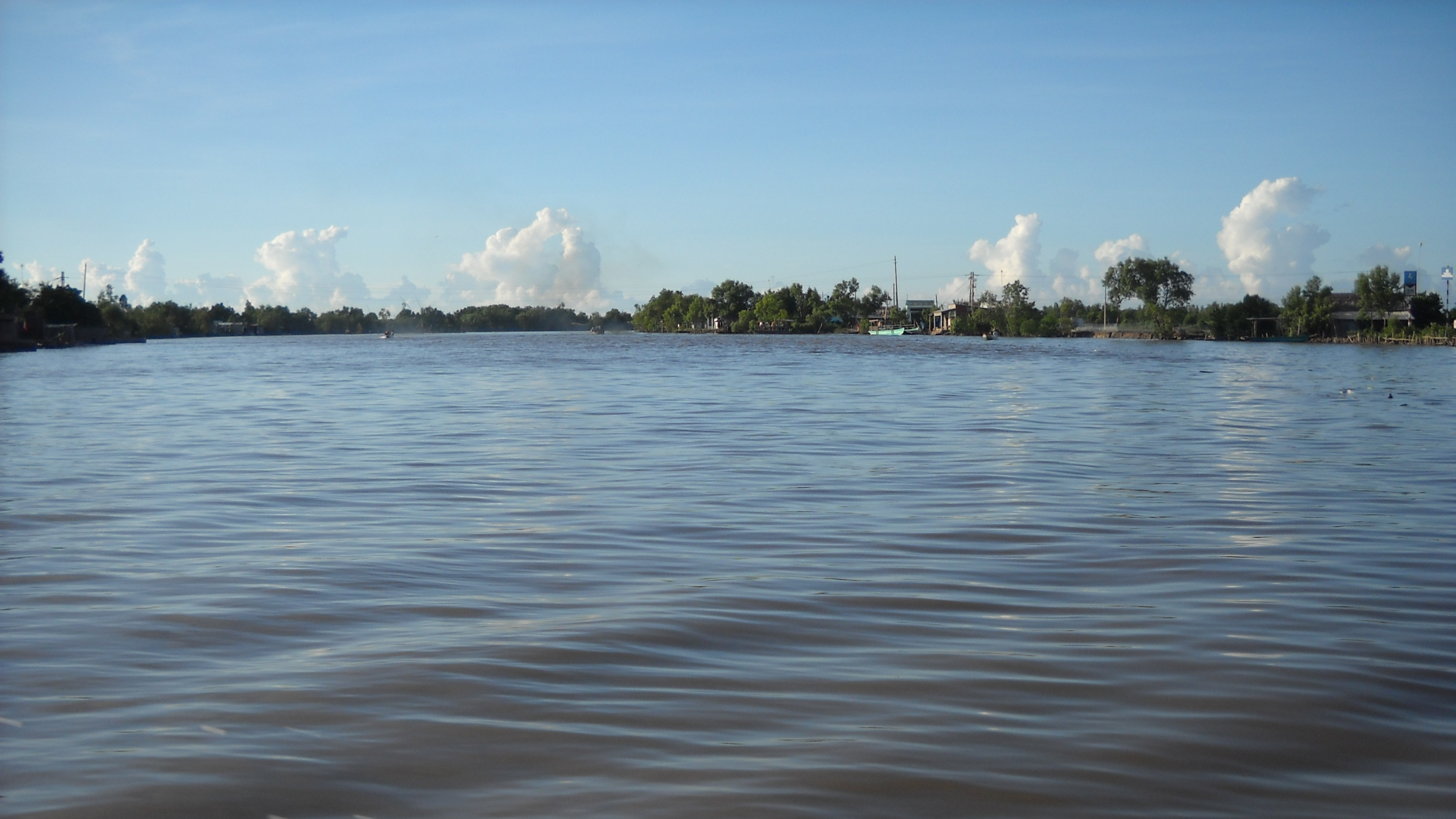
Gành Hào River

The Gành Hào River (Vietnamese: Sông Gành Hào) is a river of Vietnam. It flows through Cà Mau province for 55 kilometres and empties into the South China Sea.
