= Trần Phán =

Coordinates: 9.0186°N 105.1386°E

- Commune and village
- Interactive map of Trần Phán
- Country: Vietnam
- Province: Cà Mau
- Time zone: UTC+07:00

Trần Phán is a commune (xã) and village in Cà Mau province, in Vietnam.

The Standing Committee of the National Assembly issued Resolution No. 1655/NQ-UBTVQH15 on the rearrangement of commune-level administrative units of Cà Mau Province in 2025 (the resolution takes effect from 16 June 2025). Accordingly, Trần Phán Commune was established in Cà Mau Province on the basis of the entire natural area of 33.10 km² and a population of 12,344 people of Tân Trung Commune, and the entire natural area of 41.80 km² and a population of 17,605 people of Trần Phán Commune, both belonging to Đầm Dơi District.
