= Tân Tiến, Cà Mau =

Tân Tiến
- Commune and village
- Interactive map of Tân Tiến
- Country: Vietnam
- Province: Cà Mau
- Time zone: UTC+07:00

Tân Tiến is a commune (xã) and village in Cà Mau province, in Vietnam.

The Standing Committee of the National Assembly issued Resolution No. 1655/NQ-UBTVQH15 on the rearrangement of commune-level administrative units of Cà Mau Province in 2025 (the resolution takes effect from 16 June 2025). Accordingly, Tân Tiến Commune was established in Cà Mau Province on the basis of the entire natural area of 114.10 km² and a population of 18,318 people of Nguyễn Huân Commune, and the entire natural area of 93.10 km² and a population of 15,676 people of Tân Tiến Commune, both belonging to Đầm Dơi District.
