= Ca Mau Airport =

Airport in Vietnam

Cà Mau Airport Sân bay Cà Mau
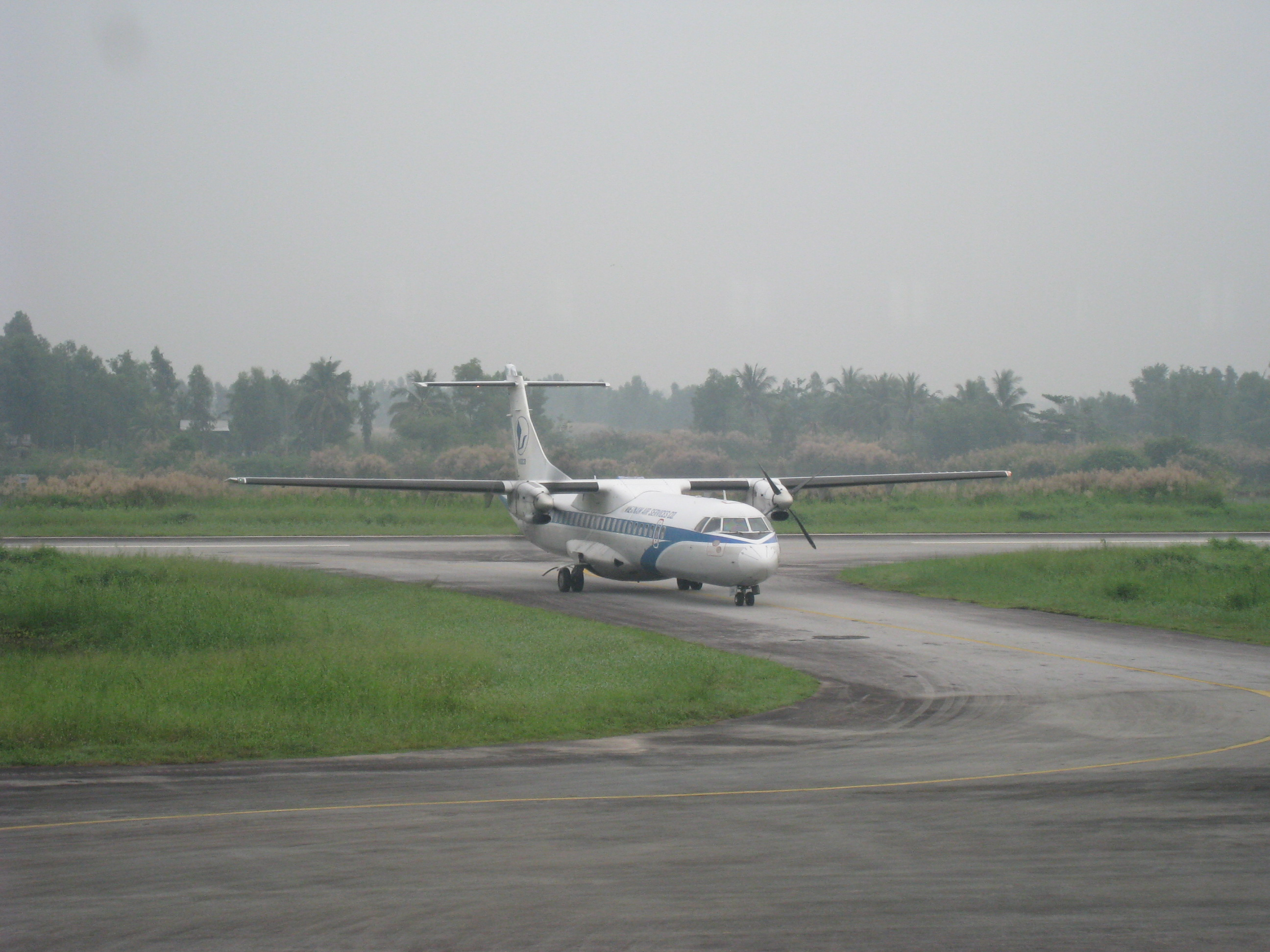
- IATA: CAH; ICAO: VVCM

Summary
- Airport type: Public
- Operator: Southern Airports Authority
- Serves: Cà Mau
- Location: Tân Thành, Cà Mau, Vietnam
- Elevation AMSL: 7 ft (2.1 m)
- Coordinates: 09°10′32″N 105°10′46″E

Map
- Location of airport in Vietnam

Runways
| Direction | Length | | Surface |
| Direction | m | ft | Surface |
|---|---|---|---|
| 09/27 | 2,400 | 7,874 | Asphalt |

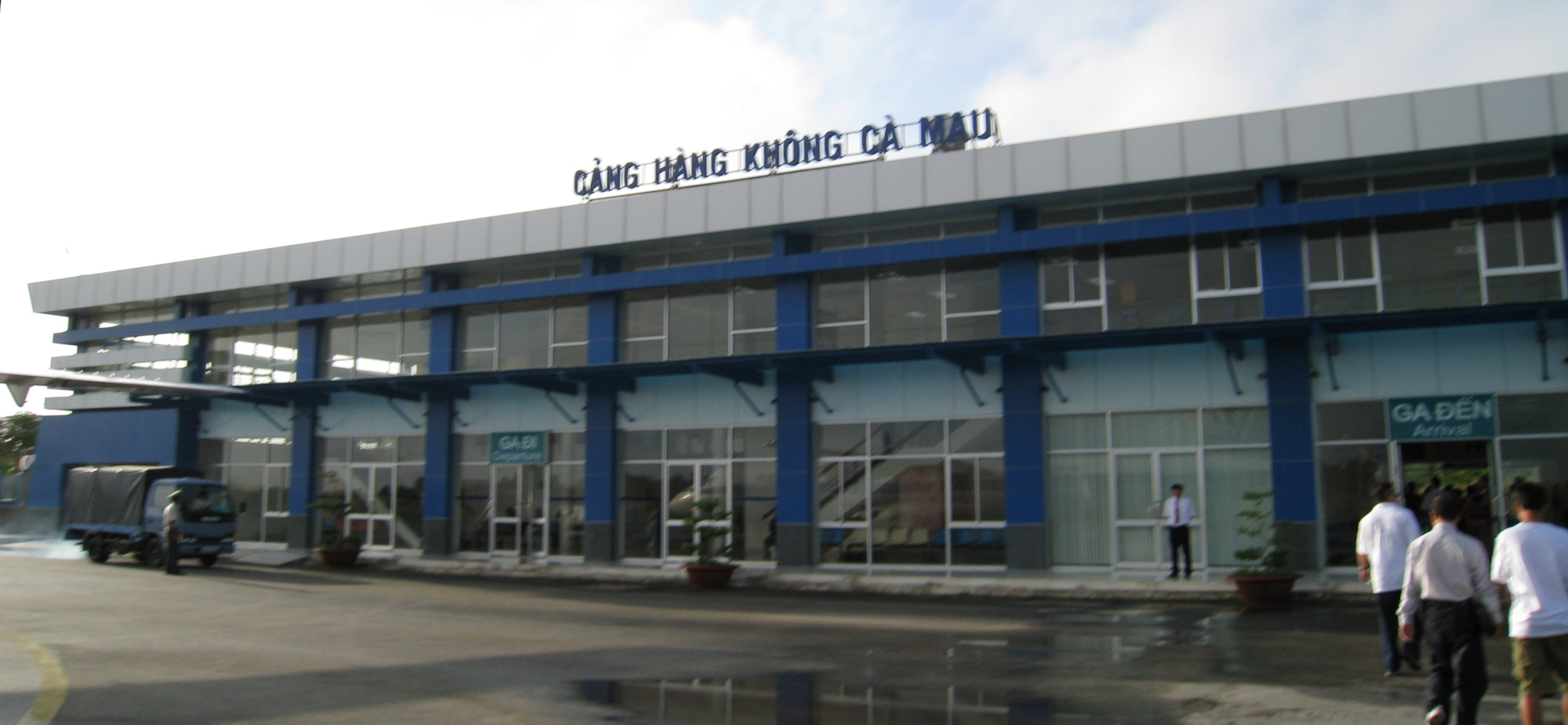
Cà Mau Airport

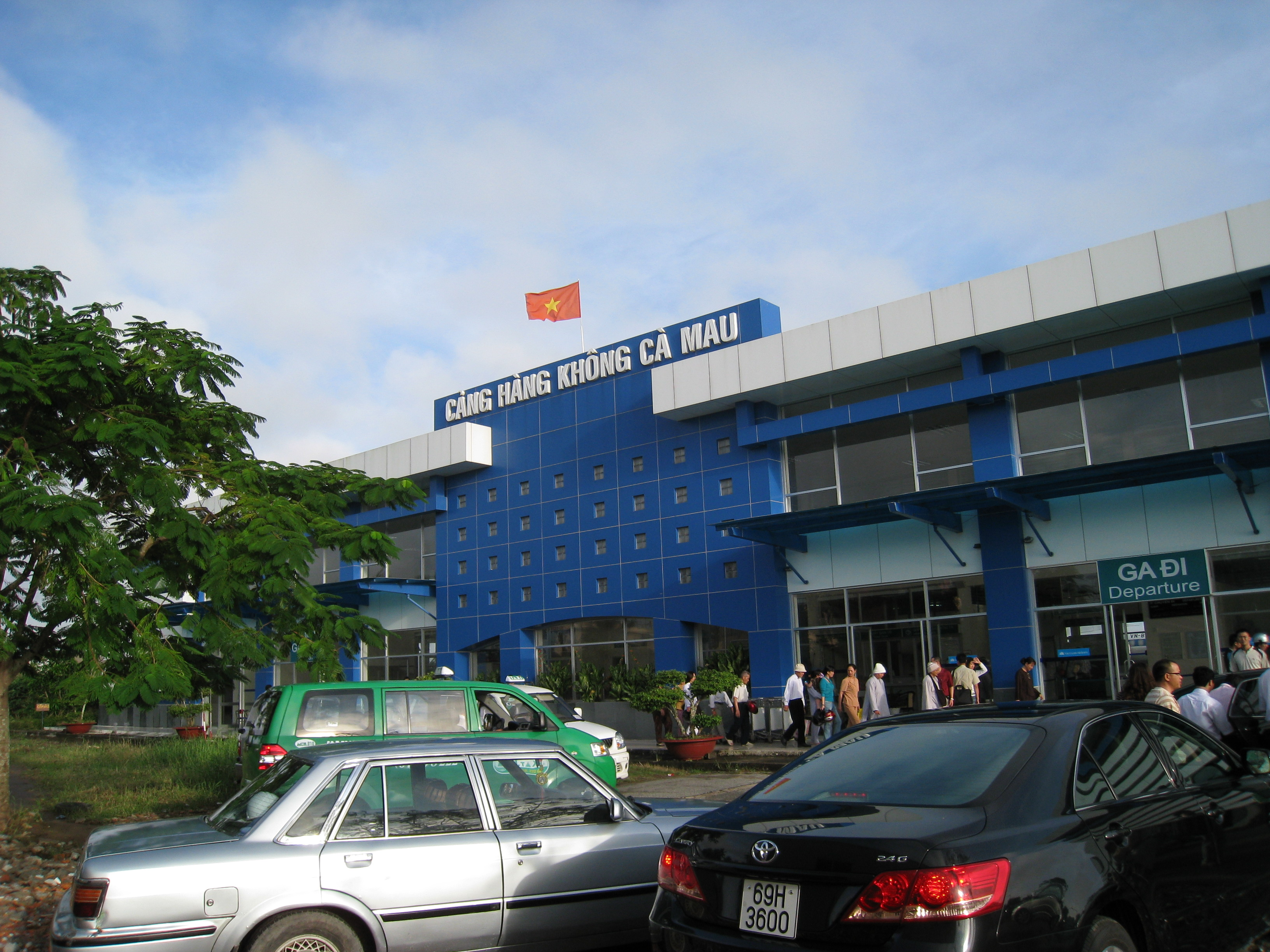
Cà Mau Airport

Cà Mau Airport (IATA: CAH, ICAO: VVCM) (Vietnamese: Sân bay Cà Mau) is a small airport in Cà Mau province, the most southern part of Vietnam. The airport is currently served by Vietnam Aviation Service Company (VASCO) with flight to Ho Chi Minh City (Tan Son Nhat International Airport, SGN).

== History ==
Initially built by the French colonists as Moranc Airfield at Quản Long town, An Xuyên province (now Cà Mau City) with the runway of 400 m long and 16 m wide.

June 1962, Bureau of Aviation of the Republic of Vietnam rebuilt this airfield in an area of 91.61 hectares, the runway of 1050m x 30m, the apron 60m x 120 m and renamed it Quan Long Airport (Phi trường Quản Long).

This airport was used mainly for military purpose, serving helicopters, L19, OV10, Dakota, C130 and some other kind of fighters. In dry season of 1972, the runway and the apron were repaved with asphalt.

In April 1975, following the fall of Saigon, the airport was controlled by communist forces. From 1976 to 1978, this airport was used for military activities only.

On 30 April 1995, this airport revived the civil flight with an AN2 VF808. Civil services continued but with low profit. From 1997, the civil scheduled flight services suspended due to low traffic, only chartered flight remained. On 30 April 1996, the old terminal was renovated. In July of the same year, the airport was equipped precision instrument landing system NDB 500II and standby generator.

On 13 December 2003, the construction of the new terminal started. The terminal has an area of 1548m2, of which the floor area is 1548m2, the suspension floor is 878m2.

In 2004, this airport handled 398 aircraft movements with 8975 passengers, 41,583 kg cargo. In 2005, this airport served 791 aircraft movements with 24,324 passengers and 125,341 kg cargo.

The government of Vietnam approved a renovation planning for this airport, according to which the runway will be extended to 1900 m x 30 m, capable to handle 2 medium-sized aircraft at the same time, 150 passengers per hour or 200,000 passengers per annum by 2015. From 2015, another runway of 2400 m x 45 m will be built, capable to handle 4 medium-sized aircraft (like Airbus A320) at the same time with 300,000 passengers per annum.

== Airlines and destinations ==
As of 2019, Vietnam Airlines operated by Vietnam Air Service Company operates one morning flight daily for Ho Chi Minh City-Cà Mau route with ATR-72 aircraft.

| Airlines | Destinations |
|---|---|
| Vietnam Airlines | Ho Chi Minh City |

== See also ==
- List of airports in Vietnam
