= Vĩnh Phước, Cà Mau =

Coordinates: 9.3833°N 105.4264°E

Vĩnh Phước
- Rural commune and village
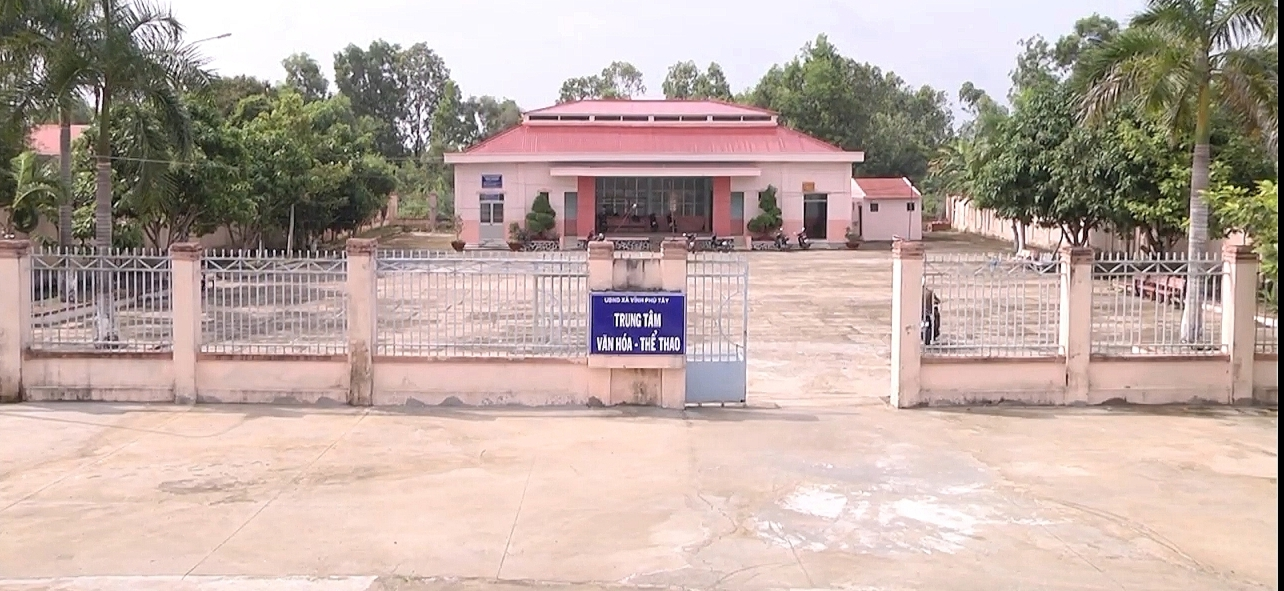
- Vinh Phu Tay Cultural - Sports Center, Phuoc Long, Bac Lieu
- Interactive map of Vĩnh Phước
- Country: Vietnam
- Province: Cà Mau
- Time zone: UTC+07:00 (Indochina Time)

Vĩnh Phước is a rural commune (xã) and village in Cà Mau Province, in south-western Vietnam.

On 16 June 2025, the Standing Committee of the National Assembly issued Resolution No. 1655/NQ-UBTVQH15 on the rearrangement of commune-level administrative units of Cà Mau Province in 2025 (the resolution takes effect from 16 June 2025). Accordingly, Vĩnh Phước Commune was established in Cà Mau Province on the basis of the entire 75.50 km² of natural area and a population of 20,014 people of Phước Long Commune, and the entire 51.72 km² of natural area and a population of 18,648 people of Vĩnh Phú Tây Commune, both formerly belonging to Phước Long District, Bạc Liêu Province.
