= Cái Đôi Vàm =

- Ward
- Location in Vietnam
- Coordinates: 8°52′N 104°51′E
- Country: Vietnam
- Province: Cà Mau
- Time zone: UTC+07:00

Cái Đôi Vàm is a ward (phường) of Cà Mau province, in Vietnam.

The Standing Committee of the National Assembly issued Resolution No. 1655/NQ-UBTVQH15 on the rearrangement of commune-level administrative units of Cà Mau Province in 2025 (the resolution takes effect from 16 June 2025). Accordingly, Cái Đôi Vàm Commune was established in Cà Mau Province on the basis of the entire natural area of 24.00 km² and a population of 18,291 people of Cái Đôi Vàm Township of Phú Tân District, and the entire natural area of 107.10 km² and a population of 18,153 people of Nguyễn Việt Khái Commune, also of Phú Tân District.
