= Vĩnh Trạch, Cà Mau =

Vĩnh Trạch
- Ward
- Interactive map of Vĩnh Trạch
- Country: Vietnam
- Province: Cà Mau
- Time zone: UTC+07:00 (Indochina Time)

Vĩnh Trạch is a ward (phường) of Cà Mau Province, Vietnam.

The Standing Committee of the National Assembly issued Resolution No. 1655/NQ-UBTVQH15 on the rearrangement of commune-level administrative units of Cà Mau Province in 2025 (the resolution takes effect from 16 June 2025). Accordingly, Vĩnh Trạch Ward was established in Cà Mau Province on the basis of the entire 10.22 km² of natural area and a population of 23,085 people of Ward 5, and the entire 39.53 km² of natural area and a population of 19,631 people of Vĩnh Trạch Commune, both formerly belonging to Bạc Liêu City, Bạc Liêu Province.
