= Ông Đốc River =

River in Vietnam

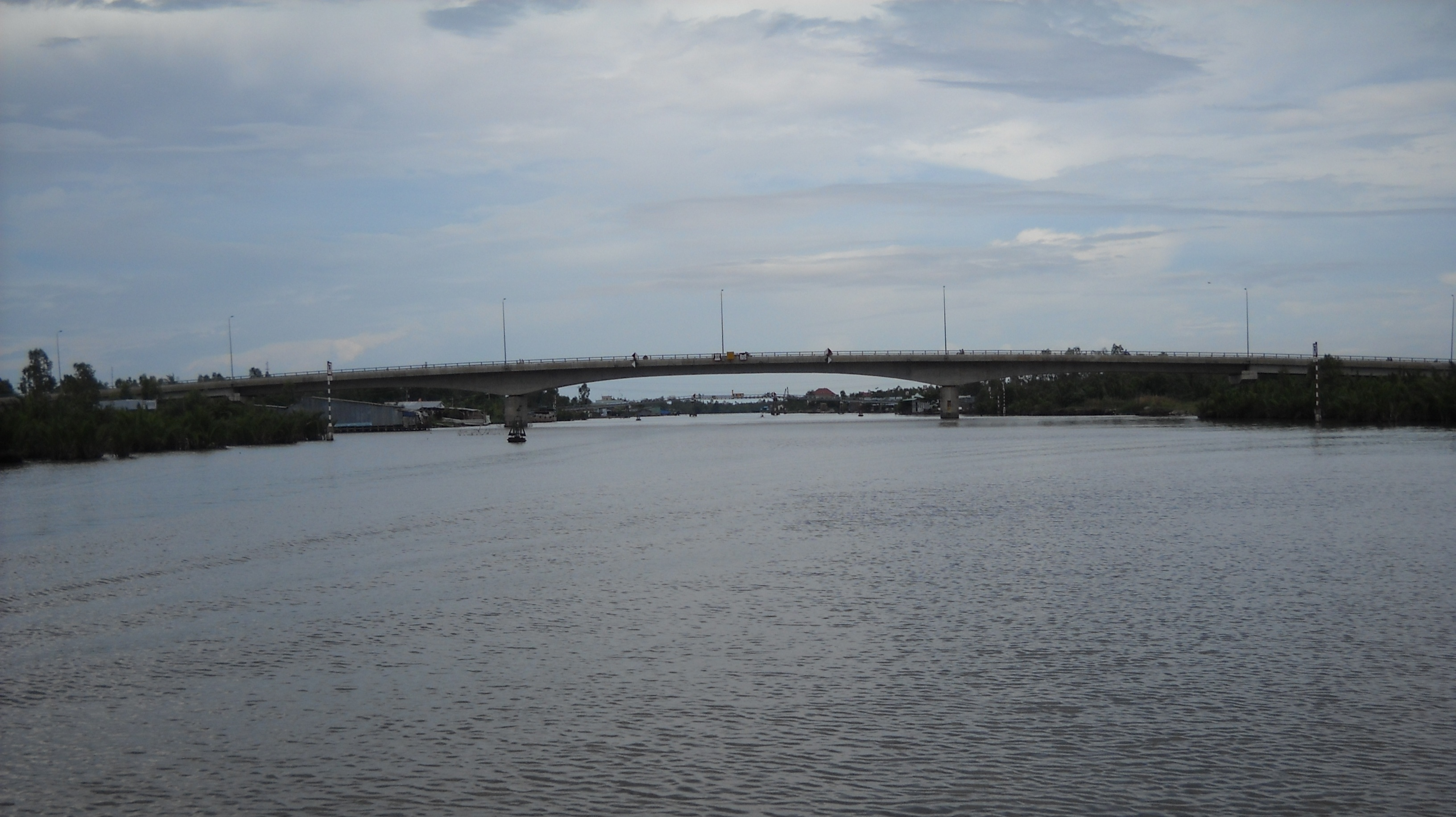
Ông Đốc River

The Ông Đốc River (Vietnamese: Sông Ông Đốc) is a river of Vietnam. It flows through Cà Mau province for 58 kilometres and empties into the Gulf of Thailand.
