= Thới Bình, Cà Mau =

Thới Bình
- Ward
- Location in Vietnam
- Coordinates: 9°21′3″N 105°5′2″E
- Country: Vietnam
- Province: Cà Mau
- Time zone: UTC+07:00

Thới Bình is a ward (phường) of Cà Mau province, in Vietnam.

On 16 June 2025, the Standing Committee of the National Assembly issued Resolution No. 1655/NQ-UBTVQH15 on the rearrangement of commune-level administrative units of Cà Mau Province in 2025 (the resolution takes effect from 16 June 2025). Accordingly, Thới Bình Commune was established in Cà Mau Province on the basis of the entire natural area of 21 km² and a population of 13,030 people of Thới Bình Township, and the entire natural area of 100 km² and a population of 25,086 people of Thới Bình Commune, both belonging to Thới Bình District.
