= Immigration to Vietnam =

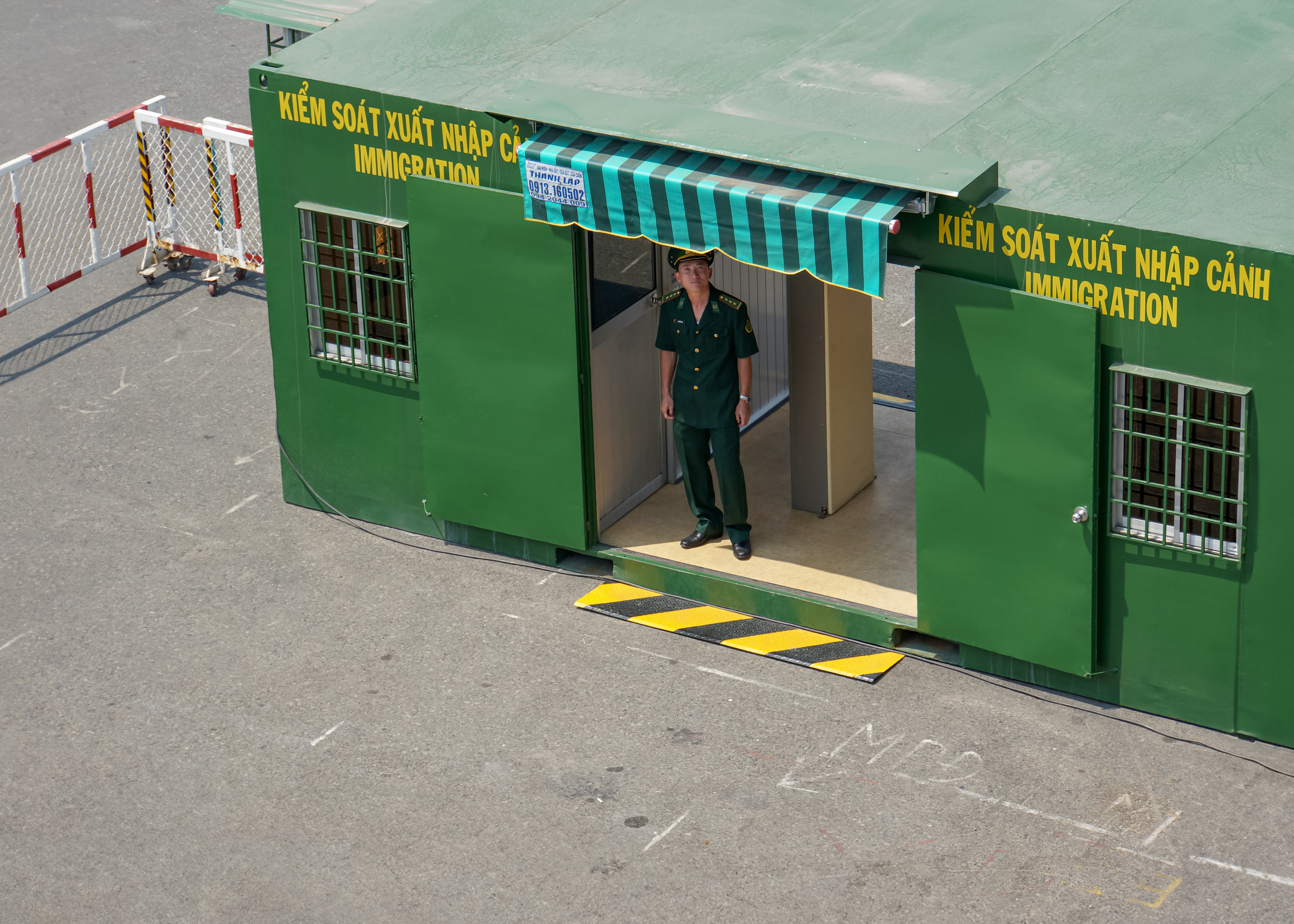
Vietnamese immigration checkpoint in Ho Chi Minh City's cruise terminal

Immigration to Vietnam is the process by which people migrate to become Vietnamese residents. After the declaration of independence in 1945, immigration laws were modified to give the central government some control over immigrant workers arriving from nearby South Asian countries such as China (including Hong Kong), Cambodia, Laos, the Philippines, and Thailand. The Vietnam Immigration Department recently relaxed the strict controls on immigrant workers under Decree 21/2001/ND-CP, 34/2008/NĐ-CP and 46/2011/NĐ-CP.

== History ==
During the French rule of Vietnam between 1925 and 1933, nearly 600,000 Chinese emigrated to North Vietnam, and in the Second Sino-Japanese war that took place from 1937 to 1941, many Chinese left for South Vietnam. Tensions between newly reunified Vietnam and China led to a mass exodus in 1978, when 150,000 ethnic Chinese fled Northern Vietnam for China due to fears of imminent war and Vietnamese persecution. In the aftermath of the subsequent 1979 Sino-Vietnamese War, the Vietnamese government made considerable efforts to drive out remaining ethnic Chinese residents, but many remained in the country; resulting in large Chinese communities in Vietnam that persist today.

Many of the recent immigrants are Vietnamese who had left the country in the 1970s and are returning to Vietnam due to more favorable political and economic conditions.

In the late 20th century, the majority of legal immigrants were men, but by the early 21st century, females accounted for nearly one-third of all legal immigrants. Over the last decade, many immigrants have been attracted to the urbanized areas of Ho Chi Minh City, Hanoi, Danang, and the Central Highlands. Neighboring provinces such as Bà Rịa-Vũng Tàu, Đồng Nai, and Bình Phước also witnessed an increase in immigration. The majority of immigrants moving to Vietnam in the last few years are much younger, with many between the ages of 15 and 34. Since the expansion of Decree No. 21/2001/ND-CP on 30 September 1992, the state has liberalized its visa policy with France, Germany, Italy, Russia, Spain, the United Kingdom, Phú Quốc island, and APEC Business Travel Card holders. This policy change led to an increase in the number of immigrants from these countries.

There are restrictions on the benefits that members of APEC Business Travel Card holders can claim, which are covered under Decree 34/2008/ND-CP. It overruled existing immigration laws and exercised new temporary immigration control for foreigners working in Vietnam. However, the Government announced that the same rules would not apply to nationals of France, Germany, Italy, Russia, Spain, the United Kingdom, and Phú Quốc Island. The Government exercised Decree 46/2011/NĐ-CP for the management of foreign employees in Vietnam, known as Managed Migration for all legal labor and student migration from outside South Asia. This area of immigration is managed and administrated by the Vietnam Ministry of Police. Immigration applications are made at Vietnamese embassies or by consulates, and depend on the type of visa or permit required.

In 2012, Vietnam saw a significant increase in immigration, with nearly 200,000 immigrants entering the country during that year.

== Work permits ==
Foreigners attempting to obtain a work permit in Vietnam are required to be of at least 18 years of age, have educational experience relevant to the job they are attempting to acquire, provide medical records, disclose any criminal record they may have, and be sponsored by a company that is registered in Vietnam. However, a work permit is not required if the worker's stay is under three months time. Standard work permits have a validity of 24 months. The Department of Labor, Invalids, and Society is responsible for issuing work permits.

== Illegal immigration ==
Illegal immigrants in Vietnam are mostly individuals who have worked or studied on a tourist visa/non-immigrant visa waiver, persons who entered the country without proper authority, and persons who overstayed their visas or entered with false documents. Many immigrants emigrated out of Vietnam during 1970s to 1980s by taking dangerous boat journey.

=== From China ===
During the COVID-19 pandemic, the Vietnamese government started a crackdown on illegal immigration, as the virus resurfaced in Vietnam, citing an "increasing number of illegal entries from neighbouring countries, mainly China". Since March 2020, there has been no legal route into Vietnam for foreigners, with only few exceptions.

=== Overstaying visa in Vietnam ===
Visa policy of Vietnam Vietnam Visa-free - 90 days Visa-free - 30 days Visa-free - 21 days Visa-free - 15 days Visa-free - 14 days Visa-free for passports endorsed "for public affairs" eVisa Visa required in advance

Vietnam offers overstaying visas to foreigners who entered the country on a tourist visa. They are required to pay a fine before they then can request a visa extension. They are required to contact their local Immigration Office and pay for overstaying Vietnam Visa. There are two types of financial prerequisites for overstaying in Vietnam: a fine fee, and an extension fee, but in case the extension request is declined, the foreigner has to pay an exit visa fee and will be forced to leave the country. If foreigners have overstayed for a maximum of 2 days, they can pay their fine for overstaying at the airport.

== Statistics ==
Country	Population	Year	Ref
Laos	290,000	2019	
Taiwan	99,350	2012	
Japan	18,949	2023	
South Korea	16,900	2018	
France	12,145	2016	
United Kingdom	3,800	2006	
United States	3,000	2014	
Ukraine	2,000	2017	
India	1,000	2001	
Brazil	333	2020	
Mexico	95	2020	

== See also ==
- List of diplomatic missions of Vietnam
- Visa requirements for Vietnamese citizens
- Vietnamese American
