= Cà Mau province =

Province of Vietnam

Cà Mau ទឹកខ្មៅ
- Province
- Tỉnh Cà Mau 省哥毛
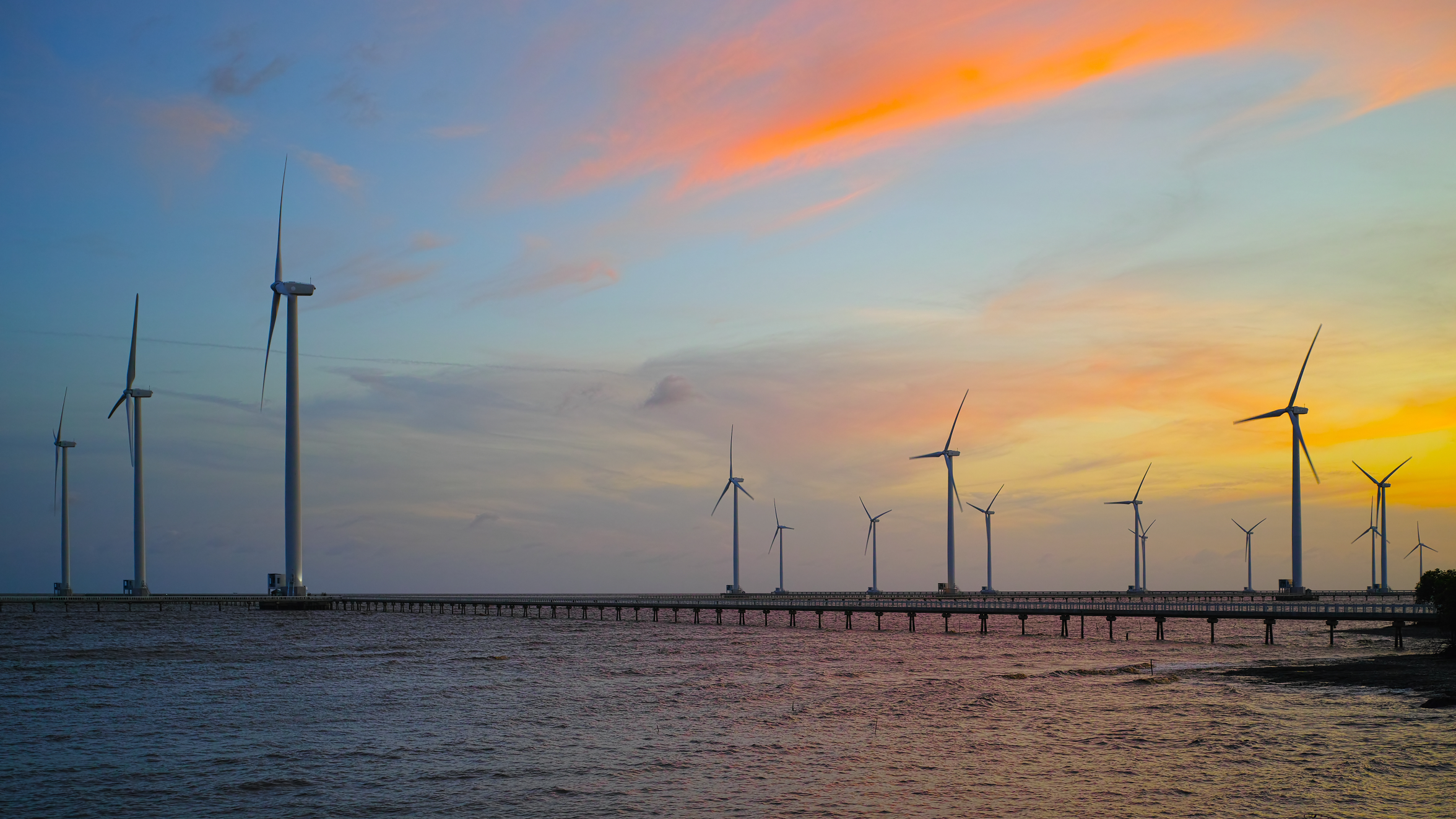
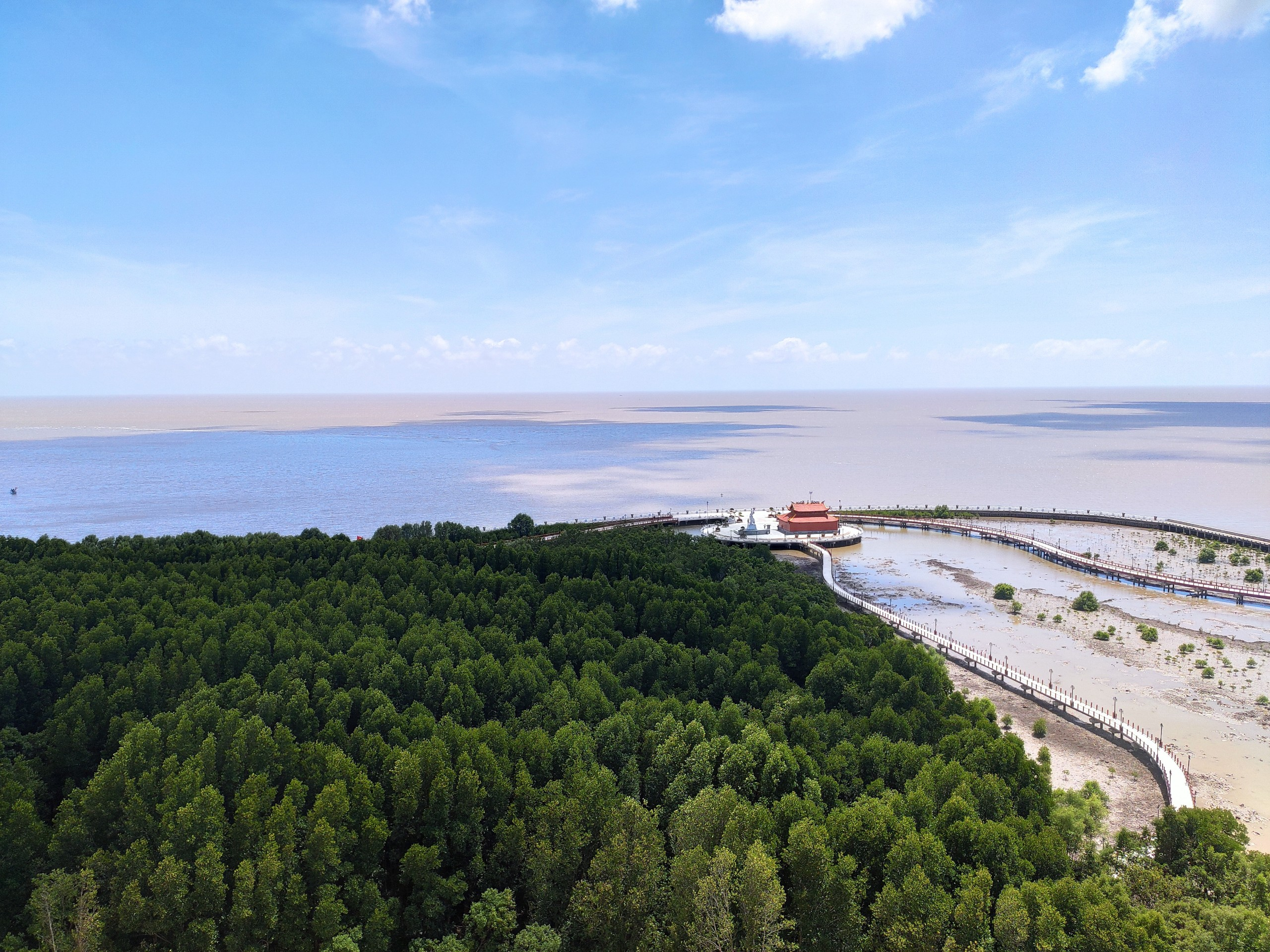
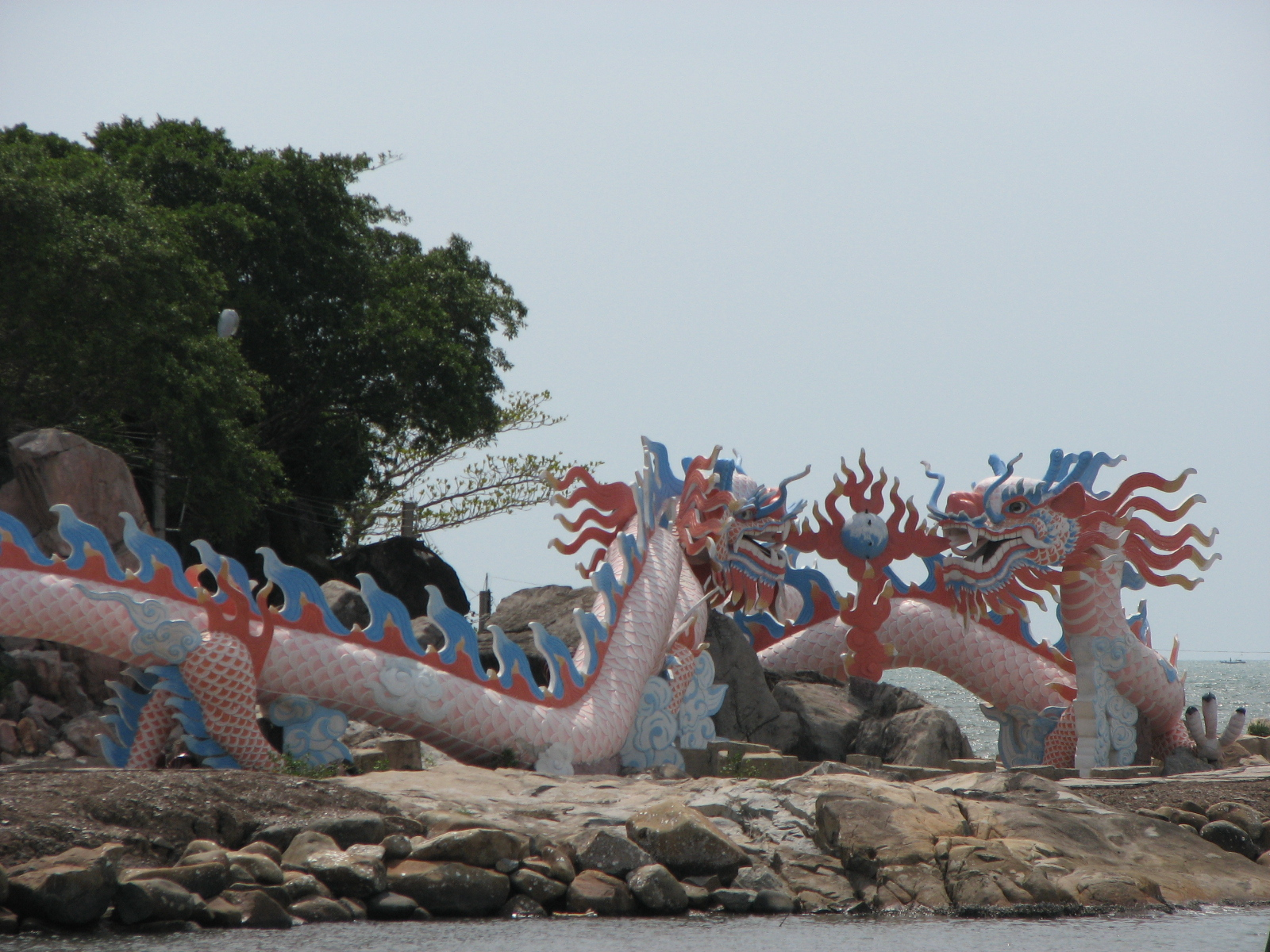
- Clockwise from top: Windpower turbines Bạc Liêu; Đá Bạc Islet, Ngọc Hiển; Mũi Cà Mau National Park
- Nickname: Black Water
- Location of Cà Mau within Vietnam
- Coordinates: 9°5′N 105°5′E
- Country: Vietnam
- Region: Mekong Delta
- Seat: Tân Thành ward

Government
  - People's Council Chair: Phạm Văn Thiều
  - People's Committee Chair: Lữ Quang Ngời

Area
  - Total: 7,942.39 km^{2} (3,066.57 sq mi)

Population (2025)
  - Total: 2,606,672
  - Density: 328.197/km^{2} (850.027/sq mi)

Demographics
  - Ethnicities: Kinh, Khmer, Hoa, Châm

GDP
  - Total: VND 53.229 trillion US$ 2.312 billion
- Time zone: UTC+7 (ICT)
- Area codes: 290
- ISO 3166 code: VN-59
- HDI (2020): ▲0.687 (46th)
- Website: www.camau.gov.vn

Cà Mau is a province of Vietnam in the Mekong Delta, and is the southernmost of the 34 administrative divisions of Vietnam.

== Etymology ==
The name "Cà Mau" (previously spelled Cà-mau) comes from the former Khmer name for the area, composed of the words tuĕk (ទឹក, lit. 'water') and khmau (ខ្មៅ, lit. 'black', altogether meaning "black water".

== Geography ==
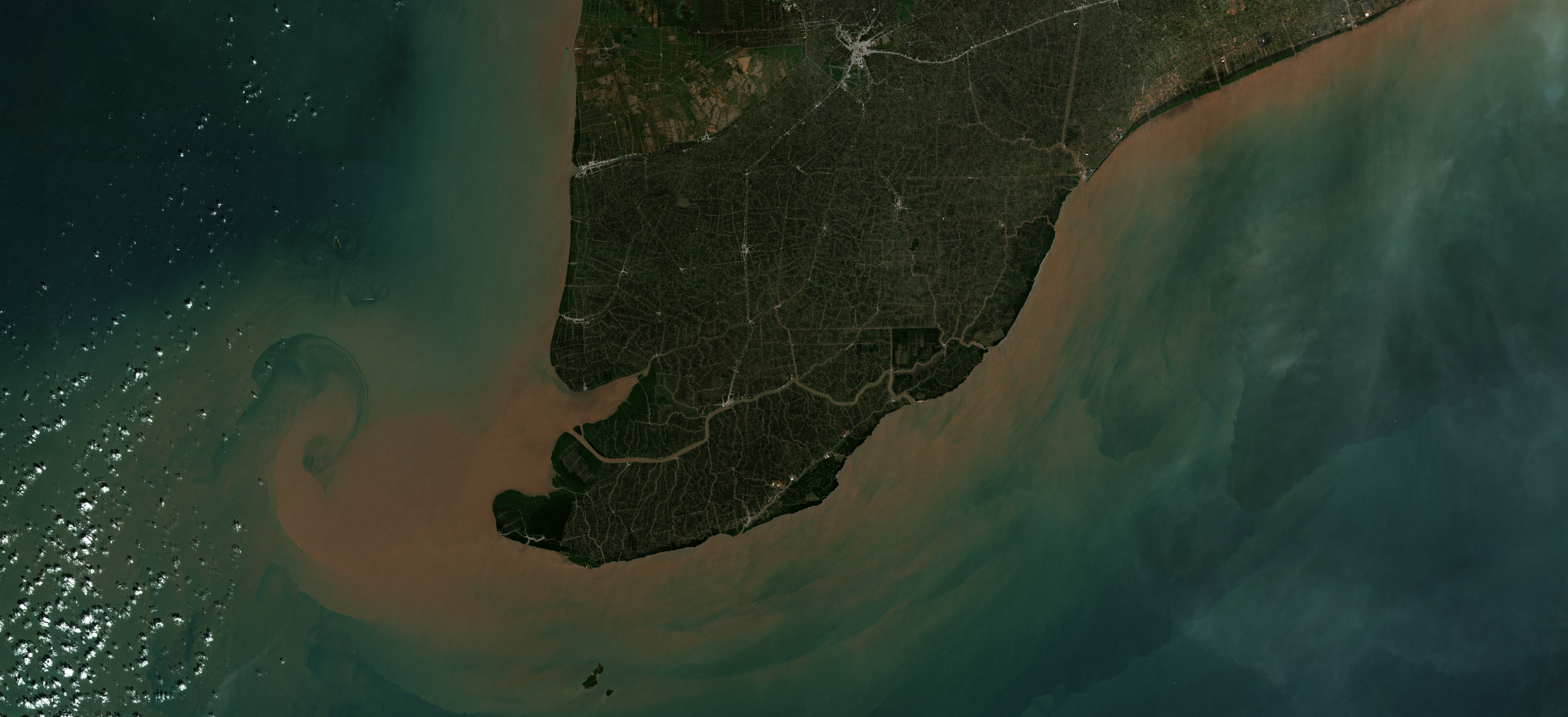
Satellite image of Cà Mau

=== Overview ===
Cà Mau is the southernmost province of Vietnam, in the Mekong Delta. The mainland part of the province is located at 8034' to 9033' north latitude and 104043' to 105025 east longitude, 370km from Hồ Chí Minh City, 180km south of Cần Thơ.

Cà Mau is located on a peninsula, has a rather special geographical location, with 3 sides adjacent to the sea. Cà Mau Cape is the only place on land where you can watch the sun rise from the South China Sea in the morning and set in the Gulf of Thailand in the afternoon.

=== Terrain ===
Ca Mau is on a delta region, with rivers and canals. The average height is 0.5 meters to 1.5 meters above sea level. The direction of the terrain is gradually inclined from North to South, from Northeast to Southwest. The area of Cà Mau is in the lowlands with flooding especially in the southern edge. It has five main soil groups: acid sulfate soil, peat soil, alluvial soil, saline soil, and canal soil.

The local low-lying areas in the central low-lying area of the Cà Mau Peninsula have a topographic relationship with the ancient riverbed. The lowlands of U Minh and Trần Văn Thời are inland "hanging depressions" limited by the natural dikes of the system of Ông Đốc, Cái Tàu, Trẹm rivers and high ledges along the West Sea (Gulf of Thailand). This hanging low-lying area stagnates water all year round and becomes a swamp. Most of the land in Cà Mau is a younger land formed by sedimentation, accumulated over the years, somewhat fertile and suitable for aquaculture, rice cultivation, mangrove planting, brackish flooding, etc.

Cà Mau has ecosystem of forests in coastline (which streches up to 310 kilometers) and inland where it covered 35.000 hectares of land. 77% of mangrove forests in Mekong region is located in Cà Mau.

=== Climate ===
Cà Mau is featured for its near-equatorial Tropical monsoon climate (Khí hậu nhiệt đới gió mùa cận xích đạo). It has 165 days in a year containing rain with 2.360 mm annually. The average annual humidity is 85.6% and the average annual temperature is 26.5°C. The highest average temperature of the year occurs in April, around 27.6°C. The lowest average temperature is in January, which is about 25°C. The average annual temperature range is 2.7°C.

=== Rivers and hydrology ===
Cà Mau features a dense and interwoven network of rivers and canals, resembling a spiderweb, with a total length of approximately 14,000 kilometers of waterways. This extensive system provides favorable conditions for inland waterway transportation and logistics.

The river and canal system in Cà Mau is extensive and highly interconnected, featuring numerous large rivers with considerable depth that facilitate the transport of alluvium, contributing to the enrichment of the mainland. Major rivers in Cà Mau include the Tam Giang, Gành Hào, Bảy Háp, Sông Đốc, Đầm Dơi, Cái Tàu, Trầm Trẹm, Quản Lộ-Phụng Hiệp, and Bạc Liêu - Cà Mau rivers.

The tidal regime in Ca Mau is directly influenced by both diurnal and irregular semi-diurnal tides. The tidal range along the East Sea coast is relatively large, varying from 300 to 350 cm during spring tides and from 180 to 220 cm during neap tides.

== Demographics ==
Historical population
Year	Pop.
2011	1.210.000
2012	1.212.100
2013	1.214.200
2014	1.216.400
2015	1.218.900
2016	1.222.600
2017	1.226.300
2018	1.229.600
2019	1.194.300
2020	1.193.890
2021	1.208.750
2022	1.207.630
2023	1.207.400
2024	1.210.843
Source: United Nations and Bureau of Statistics

In 2025, Cà Mau has a population of 2.606.672, ranked 20 out of 34 provinces and municipalities, accounting for 2,3% total population of Vietnam with a density of 328 per square kilometers.

There are 749.896 people who followed a religion in the province, accounting for 28,77% of the province's population. About 76,79% of the religious followers are Buddhists (or 22.09% of the provincial population). Second to which are the Vietnamese Pure Land Buddhist Laity Association followers which takes up 8,24% of the religious followers (or 2,37% of the provincial population). Third is the Catholics which represents 7,2% of the religious followers (or 2,07% of the provincial population). Fourth is the Cao Đài faith followers which is about 5,9% of the religious followers (or 1,7% of the provincial population). The rest of the religions account for a smaller proportion.

There are 2.464.074 Kinh people living in Cà Mau, accounting up to 94,53% of the total population. The remaining 27 ethnicities took up 5,47% of the total figure or about 142.598 people (32.152 households) which 115.180 (25.590 households) is Khmer, 24.625 is Hoa (6.200 households) and the others are Mường, Thái, Tày, Nùng, Giao, Jarai, Ê đê, Chăm, Chu ru, Si la and foreign settlers.

== History ==
=== Nguyễn dynasty ===
During the feudal era, the land of Cà Mau was mostly wild and uninhabited. According to Gia Định Thành Thông Chí by Trịnh Hoài Đức, under the reign of Emperor Gia Long, settlers had only begun to sparsely cultivate areas along rivers such as Ông Đốc, Gành Hào, and Bảy Háp. By the time of Emperor Tự Đức, the region was still primarily covered with mangrove forests, with fewer inhabitants due to the scarcity of fresh water and the acidic nature of the soil. In the 17th century, General Mạc Cửu, along with a group of Chinese immigrants, settled in Hà Tiên and later submitted the territory to the Nguyễn Lords. His son, Mạc Thiên Tứ, established the Long Xuyên administrative unit. In 1808 (the 7th year of Gia Long's reign), this unit was renamed Long Xuyên District, under Hà Tiên Prefecture. By 1825 (the 6th year of Minh Mạng’s reign), the imperial court appointed a district governor to administer the area.

Along with the development of history, Southern Vietnam was divided into six provinces (Lục tỉnh Nam Kỳ): Gia Định, Biên Hòa, Định Tường, Vĩnh Long, An Giang, Hà Tiên.

=== French colony ===
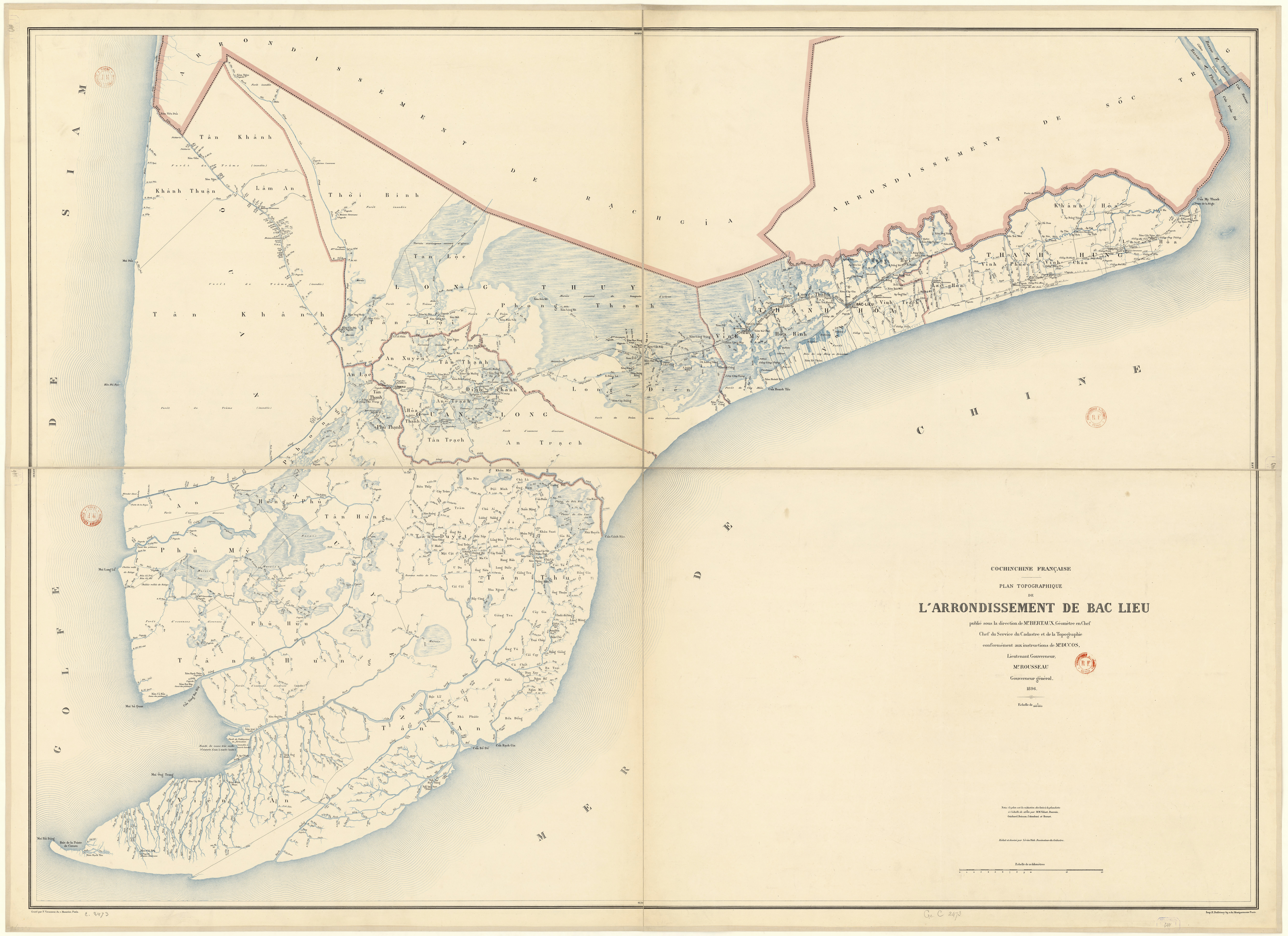
Bạc Liêu province in 1896

During the French colonial period, on June 15, 1867, the French established the Cà Mau administrative division (hạt) based on the former Long Xuyên District. On August 1, 1877, this division was dissolved and merged into the Rạch Giá division. On February 18, 1882, the French created Bạc Liêu Province by combining the Cà Mau area (previously part of Rạch Giá) with the Bạc Liêu area (formerly part of Sóc Trăng). In 1903, the Cà Mau administrative agency was established, consisting of three cantons: Quảng Long, Quảng Xuyên, and Long Thủy.

On May 16, 1911, Cà Mau was elevated to the status of a district under Bạc Liêu Province. By October 5, 1917, the district included two cantons: Quảng Xuyên and Quảng Long, along with villages from the Long Thủy canton. On April 6, 1923, part of Long Thủy canton was separated to establish a new canton called Long Thới, which took effect on January 1, 1924. On September 24, 1938, Quảng Xuyên canton was split off to form a new district. On September 14, 1942, the Tân An administrative base was established. On April 5, 1944, Thới Bình District was created, and subsequently on October 6, 1944, it was renamed North Cà Mau District, while Quảng Xuyên District was renamed South Cà Mau District. Later, these two districts were merged back into a single Cà Mau District under Bạc Liêu Province.

=== Republic of Vietnam ===
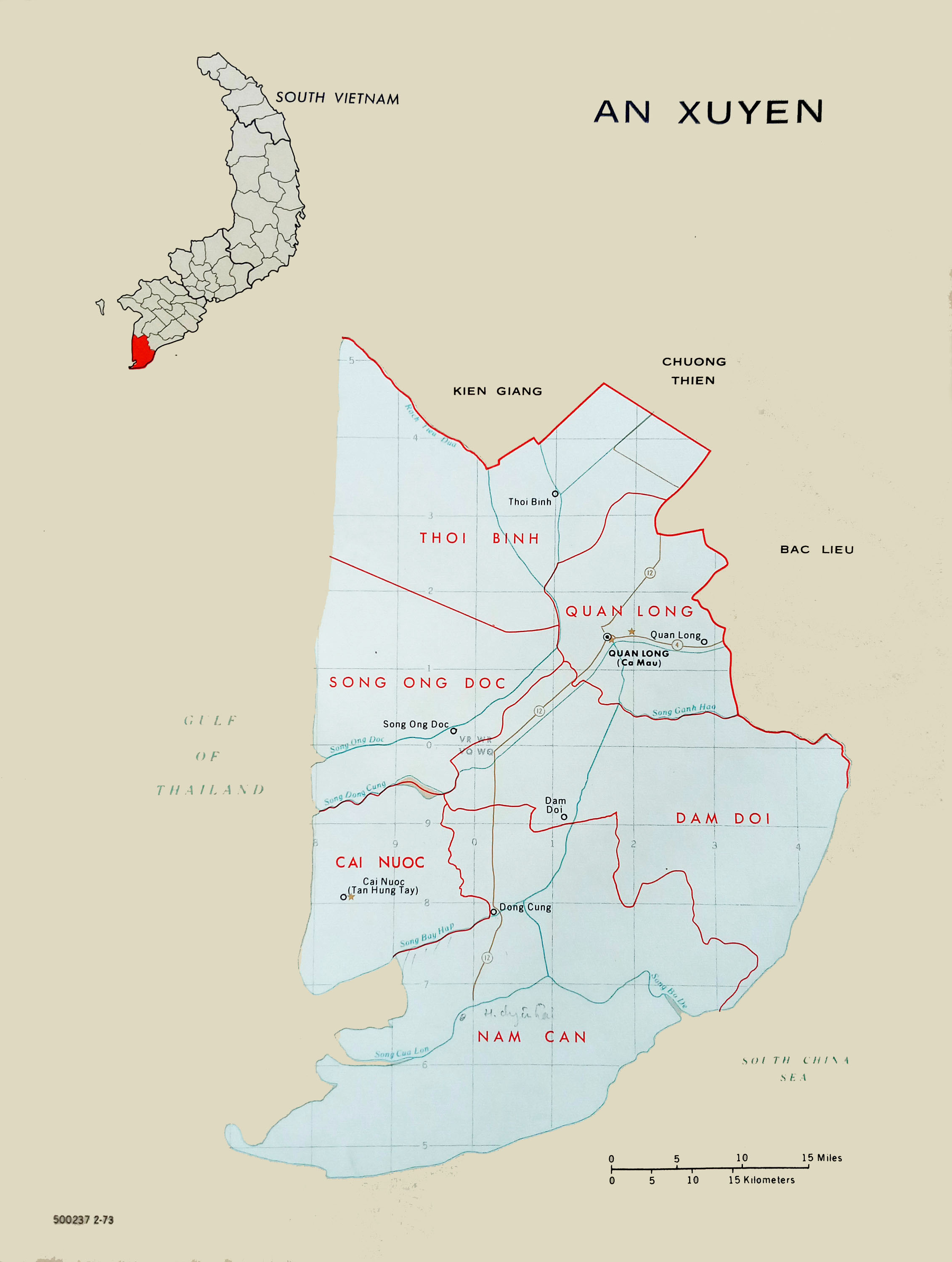
An Xuyên province

Under the Republic of Vietnam (South Vietnam), on March 9, 1956, the government established Cà Mau Province based on Cà Mau District and four communes from Giá Rai District. On October 22, 1956, according to Decree No. 143/VN, Cà Mau Province was renamed An Xuyên Province, with its capital at Quản Long. At the same time, An Xuyên Commune was renamed Tân Xuyên, which became the location of the provincial capital, Quản Long. At that point, An Xuyên Province consisted of six districts: Quản Long, Thới Bình, Sông Ông Đốc, Cái Nước, Đầm Dơi, and Năm Căn. The National Front for the Liberation of South Vietnam, and later the Provisional Revolutionary Government, continued to use the name Cà Mau.

=== Socialist Republic of Vietnam ===
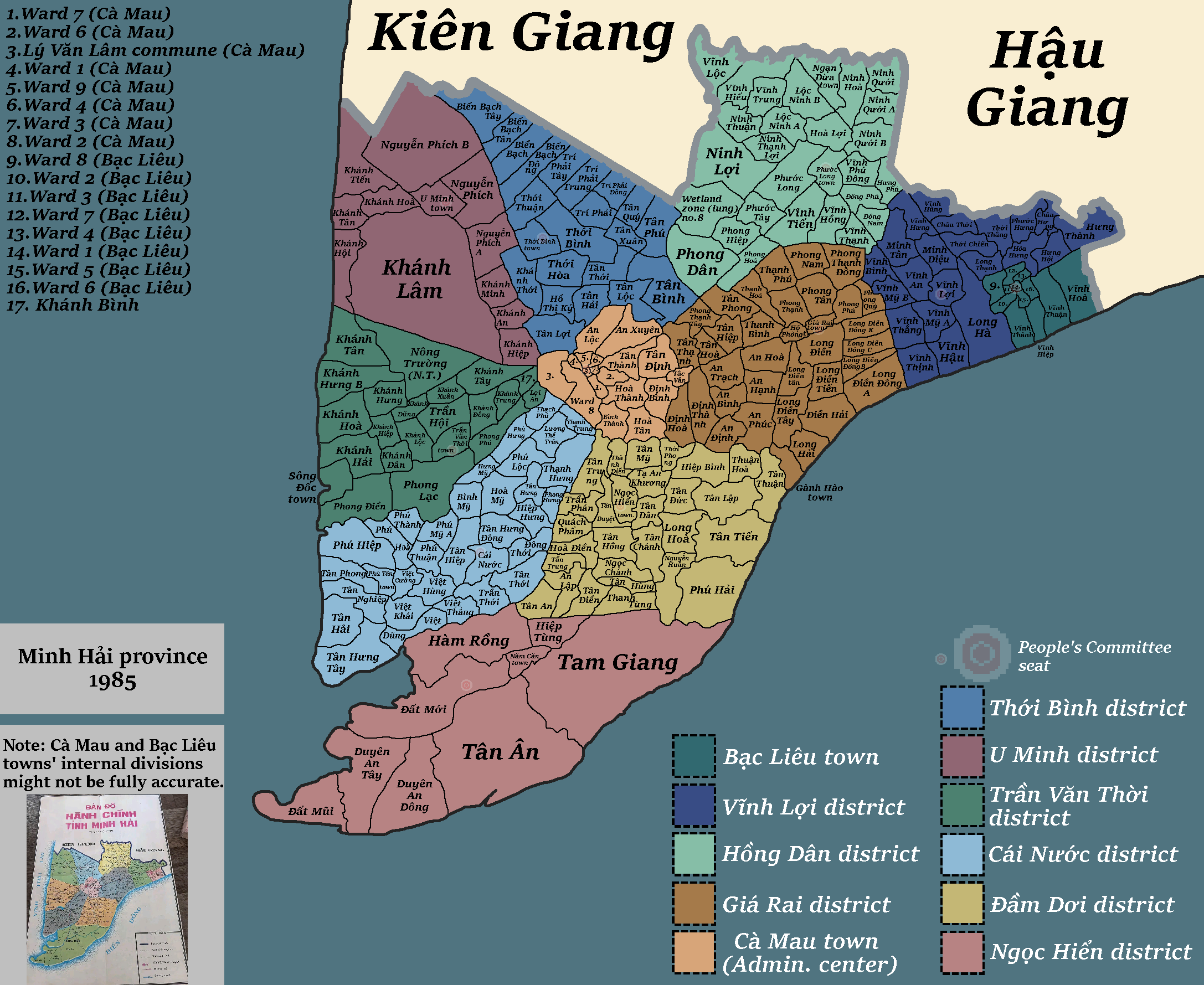
Map of Minh Hải province

After April 30, 1975, Cà Mau Province was maintained with six districts: Thới Bình, Trần Văn Thời, Cái Nước, Ngọc Hiển, Châu Thành, Duyên Hải, and Cà Mau town. On September 20, 1975, the Politburo issued Resolution 245-NQ/TW regarding the merger of provinces. According to this resolution, Cà Mau, Bạc Liêu, and two districts—Vĩnh Thuận and An Biên (excluding two communes)—from Rạch Giá were to be merged. On December 20, 1975, Resolution 19/NQ revised the merger plan, and on January 1, 1976, Cà Mau Province and Bạc Liêu Province were officially merged under the initial name of Cà Mau - Bạc Liêu Province.

On March 10, 1976, the province of Cà Mau - Bạc Liêu was renamed Minh Hải Province, initially taking the provincial capital in Ca Mau. Historian Hữu Thành said that Đỗ Mười once visited Minh Hải in the high tide season. The headquarters of the Provincial Party Committee and the Provincial People's Committee were flooded. Đỗ Mười said that Cà Mau is a low-lying area compared to sea level, if the provincial capital is made here, there will be inconveniences. From that opinion, the provincial capital of Minh Hải was moved to Bạc Liêu town, renamed Minh Hải town. After 1975, implementing the Party and State's policies, the policy of building new economic regions was implemented in the Central Highlands, Mekong Delta, Southeast, with the purpose of exploiting and redistributing labor between regions and industries to increase social labor productivity. The new economic zone of Minh Hải province is also part of the policy of redistributing the labor force nationwide. From 1976 to 1985, a large number of residents of Hà Nam Ninh province volunteered to go to farms in Minh Hải province to reclaim land and start businesses. The land of “wild forest and weeds” gradually became a rich and developed land.Annually, the Central Government assigned Bạc Liêu - Cà Mau and Minh Hải provinces the target of mobilizing 120,000 - 180,000 tons of food. Minh Hải also needed over ten thousand tons of rice reserves to alleviate famine within the province. At that time, the central and ongoing task of the Minh Hải Provincial Party Committee was reclaiming land for summer-autumn rice cultivation, increasing crop yields, and carrying out the "three harvests" of food (collecting taxes, collecting debts, and purchasing). Provincial and district officials, even school staff, were mobilized to go to the grassroots level to work with the people in digging irrigation canals and carrying out the "three harvests" very regularly. Agencies and departments had to be self-sufficient in rice for 2-3 months each year. As a result, every agency sent people to farm for self-sufficiency.

In 1984, the provincial capital was moved to Cà Mau town, and the name Minh Hải town was reverted to Bạc Liêu town.On November 6, 1996, the National Assembly passed a resolution to divide Minh Hải Province into two separate provinces: Cà Mau and Bạc Liêu, effective from January 1, 1997.

On April 14, 1999, Cà Mau town was upgraded to Cà Mau City. On November 17, 2003, Năm Căn District was re-established from Ngọc Hiển District, and Phú Tân District was re-established from Cái Nước District. Cà Mau Province consisted of one city and eight districts. On August 6, 2010, Cà Mau City was officially recognized as a grade-II urban center under the province.

In November 1997, the Cà Mau Peninsula was struck by Typhoon Linda (Openg). Thousands of people were killed, and an estimated 200,000 homes were destroyed, along with most of the Cà Mau fishing fleet.

Cà Mau Gas-Power-Fertilizer Complex is one of the three economic projects carried out in the Vietnam 2000-2005 period and along with the Cần Thơ Bridge it is "one of the two largest projects in the Mekong Delta".

On June 12, 2025, the National Assembly passed Resolution No. 202/2025/QH15, which took effect the same day, merging Bạc Liêu Province into Cà Mau Province and abolishing all district-level of Cà Mau Province.

== Administrative divisions ==
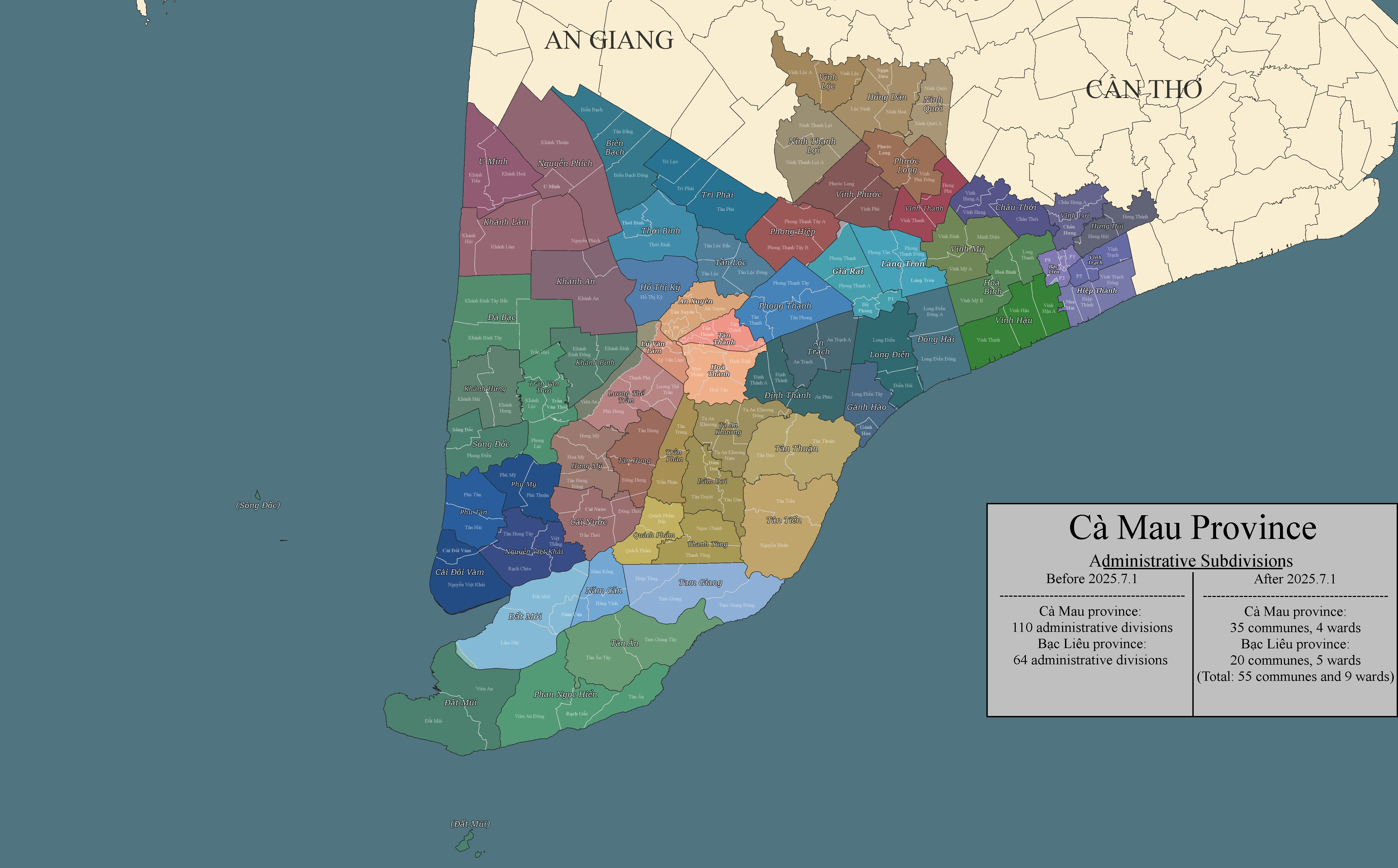
Map of Cà Mau Province, showing 64 administrative divisions.

Cà Mau is subdivided into nine ward-level subdivisions and fifty-five communes:

List of wards and communes in Cà Mau province

Name	Land area (km²)	Population
Wards (9)
An Xuyên	69,90	81.303
Bạc Liêu	29,73	93.463
Giá Rai	104,60	71.149
Hiệp Thành	134,24	38.370
Hòa Thành	97,29	47.167
Láng Tròn	106,43	46.459
Lý Văn Lâm	45,42	50.684
Vĩnh Trạch	49,75	42.716
Tân Thành	48,42	83.758
Communes (55)
An Trạch	100,23	28.412
Biển Bạch	158,20	35.702
Cái Đôi Vàm	131,10	36.444
Cái Nước	118,25	54.397
Châu Thới	91,54	41.663
Đá Bạc	211,90	41.022

Name	Land area (km²)	Population
Đầm Dơi	96,20	38.106
Đất Mới	222,94	27.683
Đất Mũi	271,20	33.298
Định Thành	117,18	35.564
Đông Hải	147,93	40.241
Gành Hào	84,65	31.552
Hòa Bình	114,77	65.975
Hồ Thị Kỷ	93,60	27.283
Hồng Dân	124,92	50.194
Hưng Hội	62,41	29.592
Hưng Mỹ	98,40	38.687
Khánh An	177,70	27.170
Khánh Bình	104,50	39.823
Khánh Hưng	129,60	41.212
Khánh Lâm	208,20	38.880
Long Điền	129,54	40.947
Lương Thế Trân	142,42	66.191

Name	Land area (km²)	Population
Năm Căn	70,06	30.135
Nguyễn Phích	245,00	37.330
Nguyễn Việt Khái	129,90	37.307
Ninh Quới	73,12	32.661
Ninh Thạnh Lợi	133,27	24.791
Phan Ngọc Hiển	237,70	35.328
Phong Hiệp	117,28	28.710
Phong Thạnh	142,96	53.912
Phú Mỹ	87,81	26.205
Phú Tân	101,70	33.381
Phước Long	98,11	47.281
Quách Phẩm	73,80	28.844
Sông Đốc	83,95	46.353
Tạ An Khương	104,20	33.179
Tam Giang	205,20	23.277
Tân Ân	218,30	23.787

Name	Land area (km²)	Population
Tân Hưng	92,41	35.222
Tân Lộc	96,80	35.450
Tân Thuận	169,80	35.473
Tân Tiến	207,20	33.994
Thanh Tùng	89,90	26.573
Thới Bình	121,00	38.116
Trần Phán	74,90	29.949
Trần Văn Thời	134,41	55.897
Trí Phải	166,60	49.770
U Minh	145,00	32.991
Vĩnh Hậu	232,75	41.899
Vĩnh Lộc	92,48	24.009
Vĩnh Lợi	61,69	29.035
Vĩnh Mỹ	115,78	52.287
Vĩnh Phước	127,22	38.662
Vĩnh Thanh	75,30	36.959
