= An Trạch =

An Trạch Xã An Trạch
- Rural commune
- Location in Vietnam
- Country: Vietnam
- Province: Cà Mau
- Time zone: UTC+07:00 (Indochina Time)

An Trạch is a rural commune (xã) of Cà Mau Province in the Mekong Delta region of Vietnam.

The Standing Committee of the National Assembly issued Resolution No. 1655/NQ-UBTVQH15 on the rearrangement of commune-level administrative units of Cà Mau Province in 2025. Accordingly, An Trạch Commune was established in Cà Mau Province on the basis of the entire natural area and population of An Trạch Commune and An Trạch A Commune, both formerly belonging to Đông Hải District, Bạc Liêu Province.
