= Hòa Thành, Cà Mau =

Ward in Cà Mau province, Vietnam

Hòa Thành
- Ward
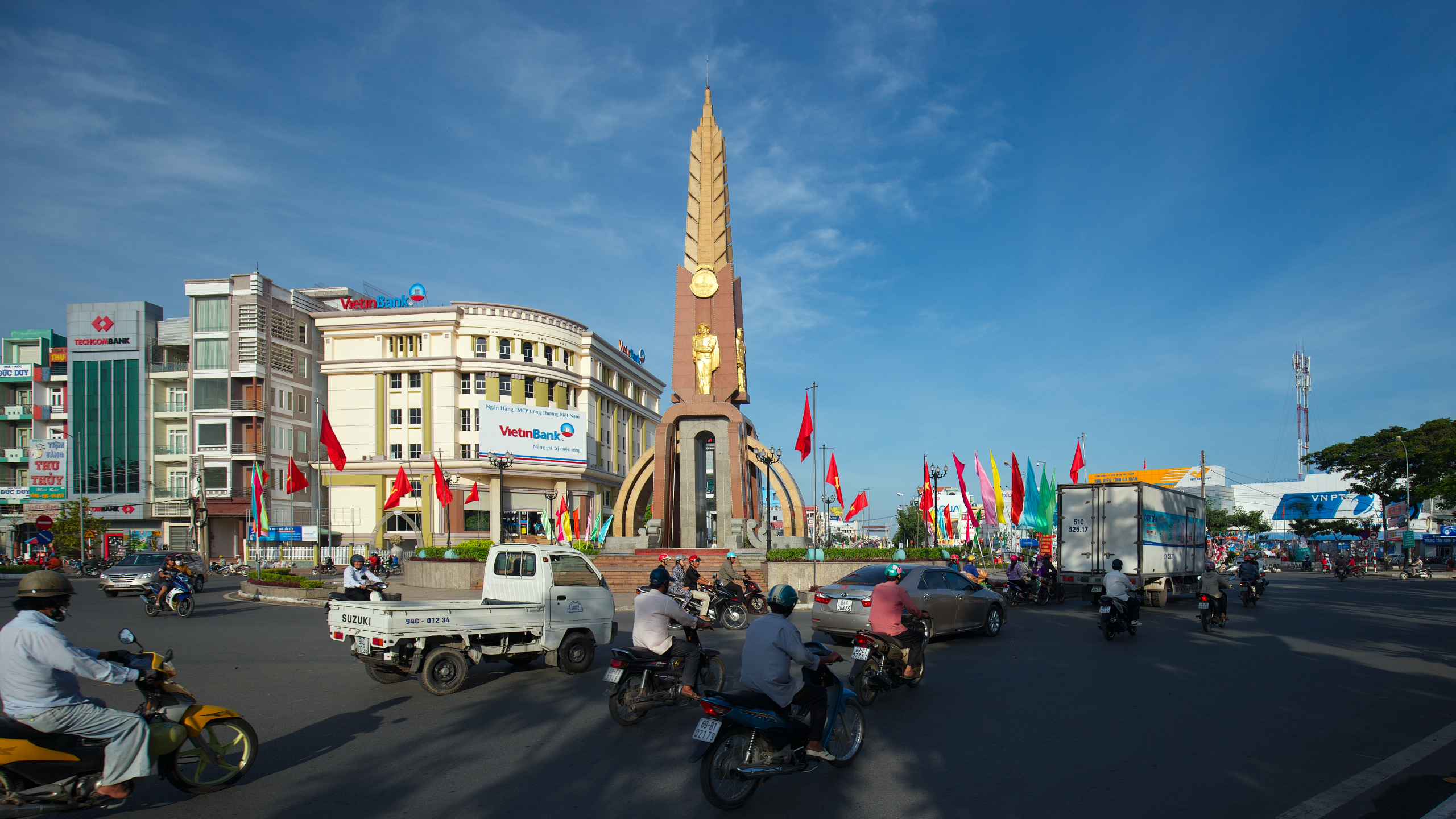
- Cà Mau city center

- Location within Vietnam
- Country: Vietnam
- Province: Cà Mau Province

Government
  - Secretary of CPV: Trần Văn Trung
  - Chairman of People's Council: Lê Minh Trí

Area
  - Total: 36.97 sq mi (95.75 km^{2})

Population
  - Total: 47.633
  - Density: 1.289/sq mi (0.4975/km^{2})
- Time zone: UTC+7 (UTC+7)
- Area code: 32041
- Website: hoathanh.camau.gov.vn

Hòa Thành (Phường Hòa Thành) is a ward (phường) of Cà Mau Province in the Mekong Delta region of Vietnam.
