= Vĩnh Thuận district =

Coordinates: 9.583°N 105.167°E

Vĩnh Thuận district Huyện Vĩnh Thuận
- District
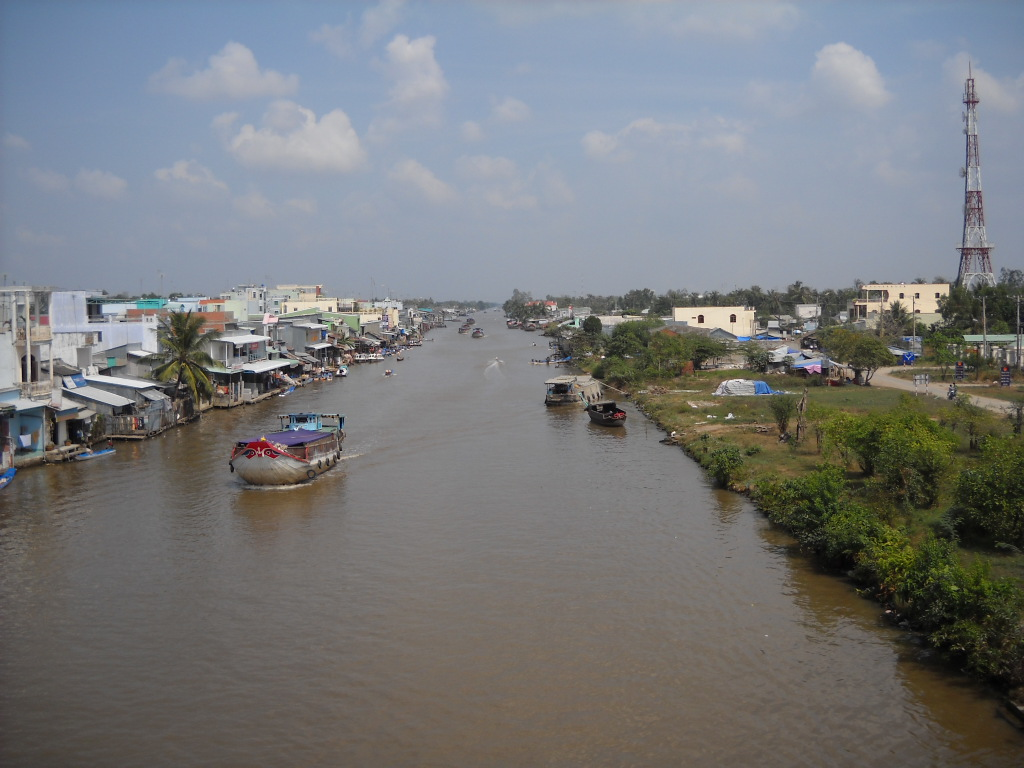
- Chắc Băng canal in Vĩnh Thuận town
- Country: Vietnam
- Region: Mekong Delta
- Province: Kiên Giang
- Capital: Vĩnh Thuận

Area
  - Total: 235 sq mi (608 km^{2})

Population (2003)
  - Total: 133,539
- Time zone: UTC+7 (Indochina Time)

Vĩnh Thuận is a rural district of Kiên Giang province in the Mekong River Delta region of Vietnam. As of 2003 the district had a population of 133,539. The district covers an area of 608 km^{2} (235 sq mi). The district capital lies at Vĩnh Thuận.

It is one of the southernmost districts of Kiên Giang Province. Despite being in Kiên Giang, it is closer to Cà Mau (40 km away) than Rạch Giá (80 km away).

Vĩnh Thuận is bordered by An Minh and An Biên districts in the west, Gò Quao District in the north, Phước Long District (Bạc Liêu Province) in the southeast, and Thới Bình District (Cà Mau Province) in the south.

Vĩnh Thuận's main products are agricultural products such as rice, sugar-cane and pineapple. However, as with other districts in the region, the aquaculture movement (shrimp feeding) has been started on endless low-productivity salted water fields in recent years. Shrimp has become an important source of income for people in the district.

Located in the centre of U Minh Thượng, "Hồ Hoa Mai" (Apricot) Ecological Tourist Area is a destination for travellers. From high watch-towers, the apricot-shaped lake can be seen, and interminable green cajuput (in Vietnamese: cây tràm - the most popular tree in the region which forms extensive forests) forests surrounding below. There are also thousands of spotless white storks in the region.

The centre of district, Vĩnh Thuận town, lies on the Cái Lớn river which flows over from Hau Giang Province to Cà Mau Province (the part flowing through Thới Bình District, Cà Mau Province called Sông Trẹm (Trẹm river)). Thanks to the Cà Mau Natural Electrical Plant, this river plays an important role in river traffic of the region.

== Divisions ==
The district is divided into the following communes:

- Vĩnh Thuận (urban)
- Vĩnh Bình Bắc
- Vĩnh Bình Nam
- Vĩnh Thuận
- Tân Thuận
- Vĩnh Phong
- Phong Đông
