= An Biên district =

An Biên district Huyện An Biên
- District
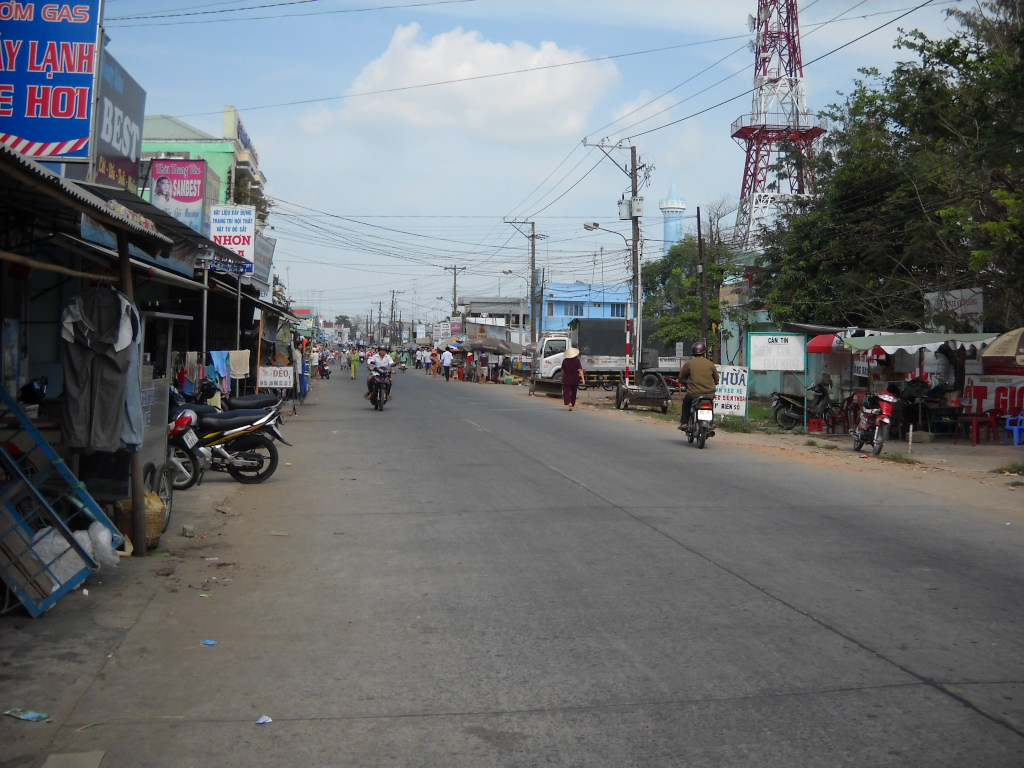
- A street in Thứ Ba

- Location within Vietnam
- Country: Vietnam
- Region: Mekong Delta
- Province: Kiên Giang
- Established: 1936
- Dissolved: July 1, 2025
- Capital: Thứ Ba

Area
  - Total: 154.55 sq mi (400.29 km^{2})

Population (2020)
  - Total: 115,584
  - Density: 750/sq mi (289/km^{2})
- Time zone: UTC+7 (Indochina Time)

An Biên was a district of the former Kiên Giang province in the Mekong Delta region of Vietnam. In 2020, the district had a population of 115,584, and covered an area of 466 km^{2} (180 sq mi). The district, like all rural districts, was abolished during the 2025 Vietnamese administrative reforms, and the former district, as well as its former province, are now part of the An Giang province. π

== Divisions ==
The district was divided into one urban municipality and the following communes:

- An Biên
- Thứ Ba
- Nam Thái A
- Nam Thái
- Tây Yên A
- Tây Yên
- Hưng Yên
- Đông Yên
- Nam Yên
- Đông Thái

== History ==
During the reign of Emperor Tự Đức until the French occupation of Hà Tiên (1847-1867), Ab Biên was the name of the only prefecture (An Biên Prefecture) belonging to Hà Tiên province, comprising three districts: Hà Châu, Kiên Giang, and Long Xuyên.

In 1876, the during the French colonial period, the An Biên prefecture, which had existed since the Nguyễn Dynasty, was abolished. In 1936 it was made an administrative district of Rạch Giá province, with its headquarters at Thứ Ba market.

In 1956, the Republic of Vietnam renamed An Biên district to Kiên An district, belonging to the newly established Kiên Giang province, with the district seat remaining in Thứ Ba. This remained true after the end of the Vietnam War in 1976.

On 1 July 2025, as part of the 2025 Vietnamese administrative reforms, 63 provinces and cities were merged down to 34 first-level subdivisions, and rural districts were eliminated entirely. As a result, the district of An Biên was dissolved. Its former province of Kiên Giang was also dissolved, and the former land areas of An Biên and Kiên Giang are now within the province of An Giang.
