= Minh Hải province =

Historic province of Vietnam

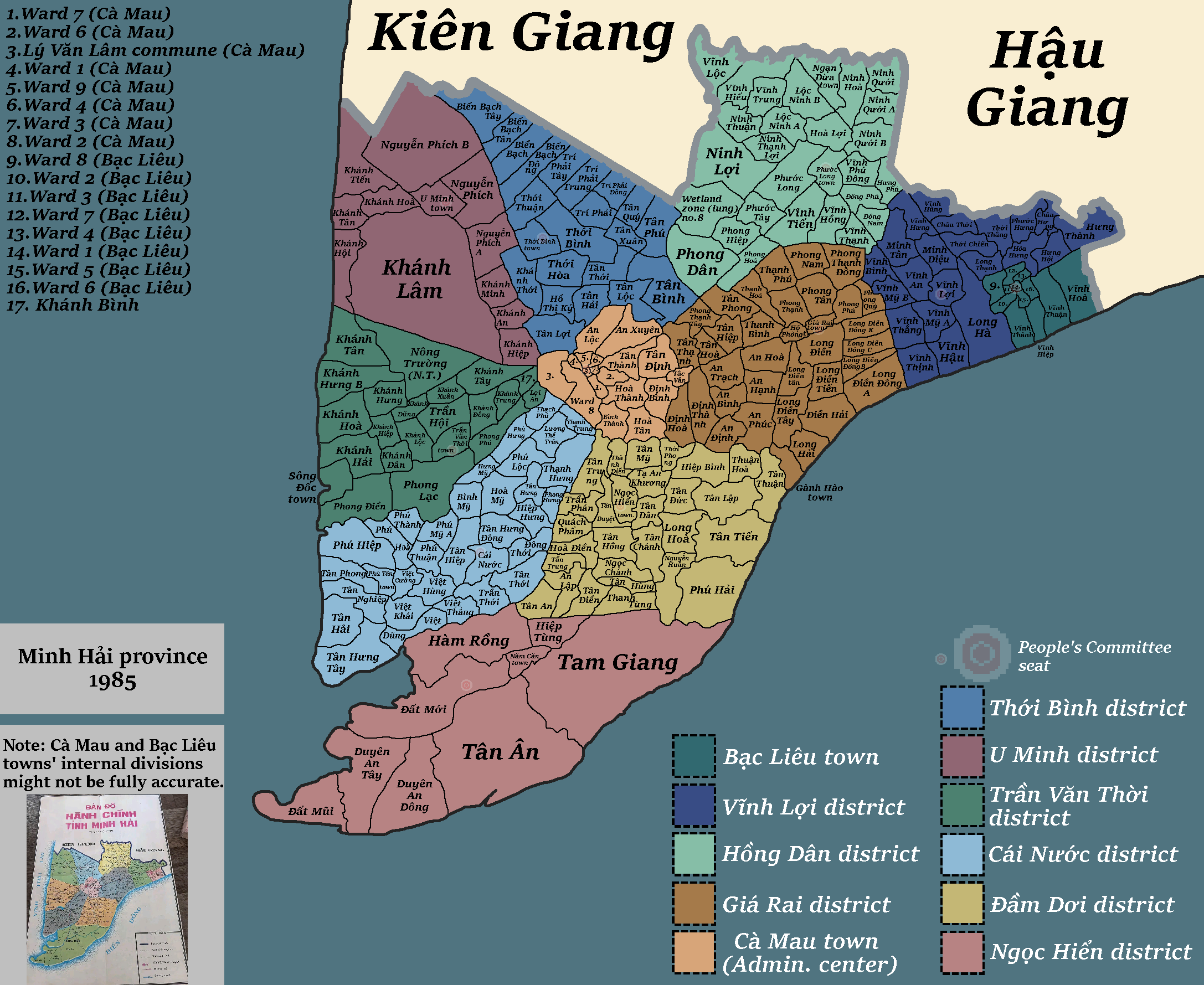
Map of Minh Hải province in Vietnam

Minh Hải was a province on Mekong Delta in southern Vietnam. Minh Hải was established in February 1976 from An Xuyên province (From 1975 to 1976 as Cà Mau province) and part of Bạc Liêu province. On November 6, 1996, it was split into Bạc Liêu province and Cà Mau province.

Minh Hải had a population of 1.840.003 in 1995.
