= Commune-level subdivisions (Vietnam) =

Second-level administrative divisions of Vietnam

In Vietnam, there are three kinds of second-level (commune-level) administrative subdivisions: the commune (Vietnamese: xã), the ward (Vietnamese: phường, lit. 'urban subdistrict'), and the special zone (Vietnamese: đặc khu). In Vietnam a rural commune is referred to as a xã and urban communes are referred to as Thị trấn, urban townships. However many communities, particularly large urban ones with provincial status, will be divided into wards which are known as phường.

As of 31 December 2008, there were a total of 9,111 communes in Vietnam excluding townships and wards. Each commune may consist of a number of towns and villages; but often wards and commune-level towns (mostly from urban districts) are divided into residential neighborhoods or wards which differ from rural communes.

As of 31 December 2009, there were a total of 11,112 commune-level subdivisions in Vietnam, including townships and wards. Thanh Hóa Province has the highest number of communes in any province of Vietnam with a total of 637 commune-level subdivisions.

As of 1 July 2025, according to the 2025 administrative reformation plans, there were a total of 3,321 commune-level subdivisions in Vietnam, including communes, wards and special administrative regions. Thanh Hóa province still has the highest number of commune-level subdivisions with a total of 166.

== Historical role ==
During the second republic of the Republic of Vietnam, a communal school district chief would be appointed for each commune. They collaborate with other leaders including the police chiefs, treasurers of the communes, administrative officials, and civil service officials, and form "communal councils". The council has a number of responsibilities, including monitoring health and education in the commune.
