= Đông Hải, Cà Mau =

Đông Hải Xã Đông Hải
- Rural commune
- Location in Vietnam
- Coordinates: 9.2240°N 105.5224°E
- Country: Vietnam
- Province: Cà Mau
- Establish: June 16, 2025

Area
  - Total: 147.93 km^{2} (57.12 sq mi)

Population (2025)
  - Total: 40.241 people
  - Density: 0.27203/km^{2} (0.70455/sq mi)
- Time zone: UTC+07:00 (Indochina Time)
- Website: donghai.camau.gov.vn

Đông Hải is a rural commune (xã) of Cà Mau province in the Mekong Delta region of Vietnam.

The Standing Committee of the National Assembly issued Resolution No. 1655/NQ-UBTVQH15 on the rearrangement of commune-level administrative units of Cà Mau Province in 2025 (the resolution takes effect from June 16, 2025). Accordingly, Đông Hải Commune was established in Cà Mau Province on the basis of the entire 100.16 km² of natural area and a population of 23,062 people of Long Điền Đông Commune, and the entire 47.77 km² of natural area and a population of 17,179 people of Long Điền Đông A Commune, formerly belonging to Đông Hải District, Bạc Liêu Province.

== Geography ==
Đông Hải Commune is situated as follows:

- To the east, it borders Hòa Bình Commune and Vĩnh Hậu Commune.
- To the west, it borders Long Điền Commune.
- To the south, it borders the East Sea.
- To the north, it borders Giá Rai Ward and Láng Tròn Ward.

Dong Hai Commune covers an area of 147.93 km²; as of 2024, it has a population of 40,241 people, resulting in a population density of 0 people/km².

== Administration ==
Dong Hai Commune is divided into 16 hamlets: 1, 2, 3, 4, Buu 1, Buu 2, Buu Dong, Cai Cung, Chau Dien, Hiep Dien, Minh Dien, My Dien, Phuoc Dien, Trung Dien, Truong Dien, and Vinh Dien.

== History ==
After 1975, Long Dien Dong commune belonged to Giá Rai, Bạc Liêu province.

On September 20, 1975, the Politburo issued Resolution No. 245-NQ/TW Regarding the merger of Bạc Liêu province, Cà Mau province and two districts An Biên district and Vĩnh Thuận district (excluding Đông Yên and Tây Yên communes) of Rạch Giá province into a new province, the name of the new province and the location of the provincial capital will be proposed by the local authorities.

On December 20, 1975, the Politburo issued Resolution No. 19/NQ regarding the merger of Bạc Liêu and Cà Mau provinces into a new province. The name of the new province and the location of the provincial capital will be proposed by the local authorities.

On February 24, 1976, the Provisional Revolutionary Government of the Republic of South Vietnam issued Decree No. 3/NQ/1976 Regarding the merger of Bạc Liêu province and Cà Mau province into a new province, named Bac Lieu – Ca Mau province. At that time, Long Dien Dong commune belonged to Giá Rai district, Bac Lieu province – Ca Mau province.

On March 10, 1976, the Government issued a Resolution on renaming several provinces, establishing Minh Hải province on the basis of renaming Bạc Liêu province – Cà Mau province. At that time, Long Dien Dong commune belonged to Giá Rai district, Minh Hai province.

On April 4, 1979, the Government Council issued Decision No. 142-CP. regarding the division of Long Điền Đông commune in Giá Rai into 4 communes: Long Dien Dong A, Long Dien Dong B, Long Dien Dong C, Long Dien Dong K.

On February 14, 1987, the Council of Ministers issued Decision No. 33B-HĐBT regarding the merger of Long Dien Dong K commune in Giá Rai into Long Dien Dong C commune.

On April 13, 1991, the Government Organization Committee issued Decision No. 183/QD-TCCP regarding the establishment of Long Dien Dong commune in Giá Rai on the basis of 3 communes: Long Dien Dong A, Long Dien Dong B, Long Dien Dong C.

On November 6, 1996, the National Assembly issued Resolution Regarding the division of Minh Hai province into Bạc Liêu province and Cà Mau province. At that time, Long Dien Dong commune belonged to Giá Rai district, Bạc Liêu province.

On August 25, 1999, the Government issued Decree No. 82/1999/ND-CP. regarding the establishment of Long Dien Dong A commune in Giá Rai district (Gia Rai town) based on 5,947.93 hectares of natural area and 15,342 inhabitants of Long Dien Dong commune.

After the administrative boundary adjustment, Long Dien Dong commune has 6,463.2 hectares of natural area and 18,027 inhabitants.

On December 24, 2001, the Government issued Decree No. 98/2001/ND-CP Regarding:

- The establishment of Đông Hải District in Bạc Liêu Province based on a part of Giá Rai District.
- The transfer of Long Dien Dong Commune from Gia Rai District to the newly established Đông Hải District.

As of December 31, 2024:

- Long Dien Dong Commune has 8 hamlets: Buu I, Buu II, Buu Dong, Cai Cung, Minh Dien, Trung Dien, Truong Dien, Vinh Dien.
- Long Dien Dong A Commune has 8 hamlets: 1, 2, 3, 4, Chau Dien, Hiep Dien, My Dien, Phuoc Dien.

On June 12, 2025, the National Assembly issued Resolution No. 202/2025/QH15 regarding the arrangement of provincial-level administrative units (resolution effective from June 12, 2025). Accordingly, the province of Bạc Liêu will be merged into the province of Cà Mau.

June 16, 2025:

- The National Assembly issued Resolution No. 203/2025/QH15 Regarding the amendment and supplementation of some articles of the Constitution of the Socialist Republic of Vietnam. Accordingly, the operation of district-level administrative units nationwide will end from July 1, 2025.
- The Standing Committee of the National Assembly issued Resolution No. 1655/NQ-UBTVQH15 regarding the arrangement of commune-level administrative units of Ca Mau province in 2025 (resolution effective from June 16, 2025). Accordingly, The commune of Đông Hải in Cà Mau province is established on the basis of the entire 100.16 km² of natural area and a population of 23,062 people of Long Điền Đông commune and the entire 47.77 km² of natural area and a population of 17,179 people of Long Điền Đông A commune in Đông Hải, Bạc Liêu.

The commune of Đông Hải has a natural area of 147.93 km² and a population of 40,241 people.
