= Giá Rai =

- Ward
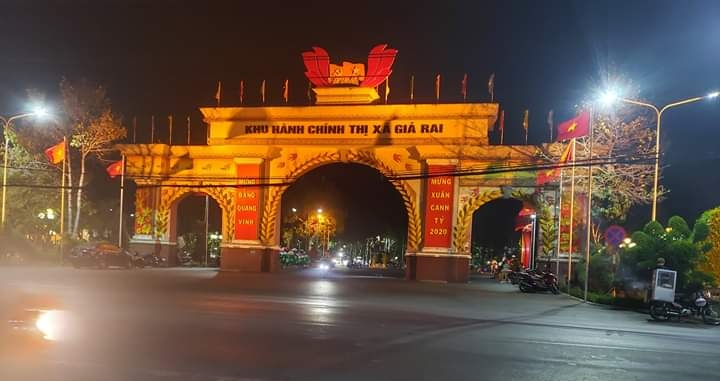

- Location in Vietnam
- Coordinates: 9°14′N 105°25′E
- Country: Vietnam
- Province: Cà Mau Province
- Establish: June 16, 2025

Area
  - Total: 104.60 km^{2} (40.39 sq mi)

Population 2025
  - Total: 71.149 people
  - Density: 0.68020/km^{2} (1.7617/sq mi)
- Time zone: UTC+7 (UTC+7)

Giá Rai is a ward of Cà Mau Province, Vietnam.

The ward is formerly Giá Rai township, the capital of former Giá Rai District.

The Standing Committee of the National Assembly issued Resolution No. 1655/NQ-UBTVQH15 on the rearrangement of commune-level administrative units of Cà Mau Province in 2025 (the resolution takes effect from June 16, 2025). Accordingly, Giá Rai Ward was established in Cà Mau Province on the basis of the entire 11.76 km² of natural area and a population of 21,974 people of Ward 1; the entire 12.08 km² of natural area and a population of 22,917 people of Hộ Phòng Ward; the entire 46.07 km² of natural area and a population of 14,090 people of Phong Thạnh Commune; and the entire 34.69 km² of natural area and a population of 12,168 people of Phong Thạnh A Commune, formerly belonging to Giá Rai Town, Bạc Liêu Province.

== Geography ==
Giá Rai Ward is geographically situated as follows:

- To the east, it borders Láng Tròn Ward.
- To the west, it borders Phong Thạnh Commune.
- To the south, it borders An Trạch, Đông Hải, and Long Điền Communes.
- To the north, it borders Phong Hiệp and Vĩnh Phước Communes.

Gia Rai Ward covers an area of 104.60 km²; as of 2024, it has a population of 71,149 people, resulting in a population density of approximately 680 people/km².

== Administration ==
Giá Rai Ward is divided into 23 residential clusters: 1, 1A, 2, 3, 3A, 4, 4A, 5, 5A, 6, 7, 18, 19A, 20, 21, 22, 23, 24, 24A, 25, Hộ Phòng, Phong Thạnh, and Phong Thạnh A.

== History ==
During the Nguyễn Dynasty, Phong Thạnh was the name of a village belonging to Long Thủy commune, Long Xuyên district, An Biên prefecture, Hà Tiên province.

In 1896, Long Thủy commune was under the jurisdiction of Bạc Liêu province.

In 1899, Long Thủy commune was under the jurisdiction of Cà Mau district, Bạc Liêu province.

On September 24, 1938, Long Thuy commune was merged into Giá Rai district. The Giá Rai district seat was located in Phong Thạnh village, Long Thủy commune.

During the Republic of Vietnam era, Phong Thanh commune remained the location of the Giá Rai district seat, Bạc Liêu province.

After 1975, Phong Thạnh commune belonged to Gia Rai district, Bạc Liêu province.

On September 20, 1975, the Politburo issued Resolution No. 245-NQ/TW on the merger of provinces. Bạc Liêu, Cà Mau province and two districts An Biên, Vĩnh Thuận (excluding Đông Yên and Tây Yên communes) of Rạch Giá province will be merged into a new province. The name of the new province and the location of the provincial capital will be proposed by the local authorities.

On December 20, 1975, the Politburo issued Resolution No. 19/NQ on the merging of several provinces in the South. on the merging of provinces Bạc Liêu and Cà Mau province will be merged into one new province. The name of the new province and the location of its capital will be proposed by the local authorities.

On February 24, 1976, the Provisional Revolutionary Government of the Republic of South Vietnam issued Decree No. 3/NQ/1976. regarding the merger of Bạc Liêu province and Cà Mau province into a new province, named Bạc Liêu – Cà Mau province. Phong Thạnh commune belongs to Giá Rai district, Bạc Liêu – Cà Mau province.

On March 10, 1976, the Government issued a Resolution regarding the establishment of Minh Hải province on the basis of renaming Bạc Liêu – Cà Mau province. Phong Thanh commune belongs to Giá Rai district, Minh Hải province.

On April 4, 1979, the Government Council issued Decision No. 142-CP regarding:

- Establishing Giá Rai town – the district capital of Giá Rai district (Giá Rai town) on the basis of * Separate a portion of the area and population of Phong Thạnh commune and Long Điền commune.
- Establish Hộ Phòng town in Giá Rai district (city) based on a portion of Phong Thạnh commune and a portion of Long Điền commune.
- Divide Phong Thạnh commune in Giá Rai district (city) into 4 communes: Phong Thạnh, Thanh Bình, Thạnh Hòa, and Thạnh Phú.

On February 14, 1987, the Council of Ministers issued Decision No. 33B-HĐBT regarding:

- Dissolution of Thạnh Hòa commune in Giá Rai district to merged into Phong Thanh and Thạnh Phú communes.
- Renamed Thạnh Phú commune in Giá Rai district (Giá Rai town) to Thạnh Hòa commune.

Phong Thạnh commune has 3,555 hectares of land and 7,145 inhabitants.

Thạnh Hòa commune has 1,656 hectares of land and 3,310 inhabitants.

On April 13, 1991, the Government's Organization and Personnel Committee issued Decision No. 183/QD-TCCP on adjusting the boundaries of some communes in Gia Rai district, Minh Hai province, regarding the merger of Thanh Hoa commune in Gia Rai district (Gia Rai town) into Phong Thanh commune.

On November 6, 1996, the National Assembly issued Resolution on dividing Minh Hai province into Bac Lieu province and Ca Mau province. At that time, Giá Rai town, Hộ Phòng town and Phong Thạnh commune belonged to Giá Rai district, Bạc Liêu province.

On December 24, 2001, the Government issued Decree No. 98/2001/ND-CP. regarding the establishment of Dong Hai district (Dong Hai) in Bac Lieu province (Bac Lieu) on the basis of a part of Gia Rai district (Gia Rai town). At that time, Gia Rai town, Ho Phong town and Phong Thanh commune belonged to Gia Rai district (Gia Rai town).

On December 24, 2003, the Government issued Decree No. 166/2003/ND-CP regarding the establishment of Phong Thanh A commune in Gia Rai district based on 3,800 hectares of natural area and 9,271 inhabitants of Phong Thanh commune.

After adjusting the administrative boundaries, Phong Thanh commune retains 4,124 hectares of natural area and 10,061 inhabitants.

On August 2, 2013, the Ministry of Construction issued Decision No. 717/QD-BXD Regarding the recognition of Ho Phong - Gia Rai town, Gia Rai district (town) as a Type IV urban area in Vietnam.

On May 15, 2015, the Standing Committee of the National Assembly issued Resolution No. 930/NQ-UBTVQH13 of 2015 on the establishment of Gia Rai town and 3 wards belonging to Gia Rai town, Bac Lieu province. regarding:

- Establishment of Giá Rai town in Bạc Liêu province on the basis of the entire Giá Rai district.
- Establishment of Ward 1 in Giá Rai town based on the entire 1,186.60 hectares of natural area and 16,906 people of Giá Rai town.
- Establishment of Ho Phong ward in Gia Rai town based on the entire 1,195.22 hectares of natural area and 19,475 people of Ho Phong town.
- Phong Thanh commune and Phong Thanh A commune in Gia Rai town.

On June 12, 2025, the National Assembly issued Resolution No. 202/2025/QH15. on the rearrangement of provincial-level administrative units (the resolution takes effect from June 12, 2025 (2025). Accordingly, the province of Bạc Liêu will be merged into the province of Cà Mau.

June 16, 2025:

- The National Assembly issued Resolution No. 203/2025/QH15 regarding the amendment and supplementation of certain articles of the Constitution of the Socialist Republic of Vietnam. Accordingly, the operation of district-level administrative units nationwide will end from July 1, 2025.
- The Standing Committee of the National Assembly issued Resolution No. 1655/NQ-UBTVQH15 regarding the arrangement of commune-level administrative units of Ca Mau province in 2025 (resolution effective from June 16, 2025). Accordingly, Gia Rai ward is established in Ca Mau province based on the entire 11.76 km² natural area and a population of 21,974 people of Ward 1; The entire 12.08 km² of natural area and a population of 22,917 people of Ho Phong ward; the entire 46.07 km² of natural area and a population of 14,090 people of Phong Thanh commune; and the entire 34.69 km² of natural area and a population of 12,168 people of Phong Thanh A commune, all belonging to Gia Rai town, Bac Lieu province.

Gia Rai Ward has a natural area of 104.60 km² and a population of 71,149 people.

== Images ==
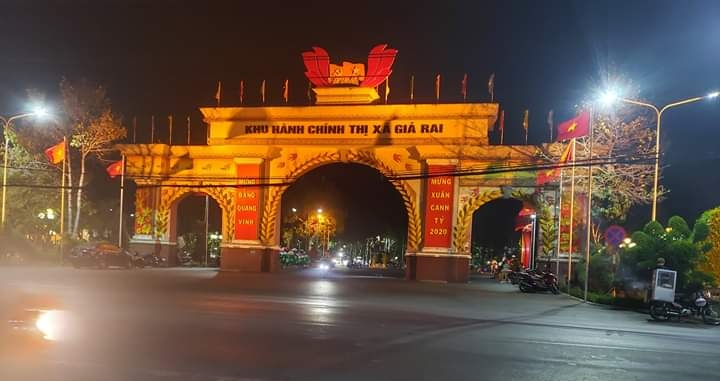
The Giá Rai administrative complex in spring, at night

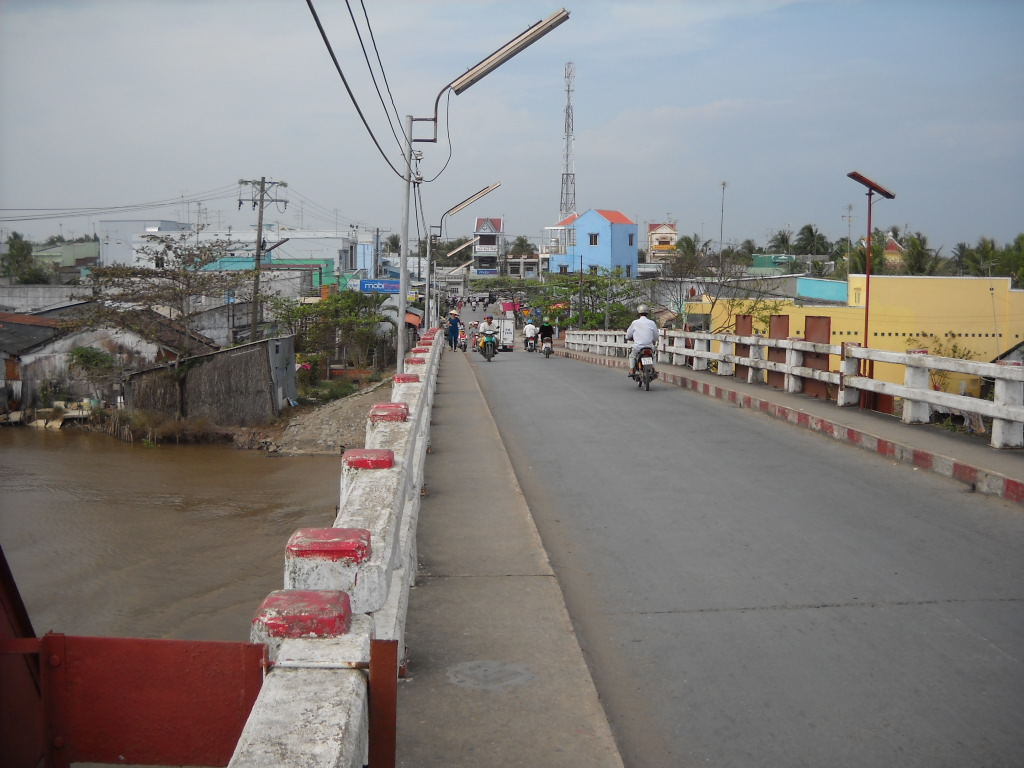
A view of Giá Rai

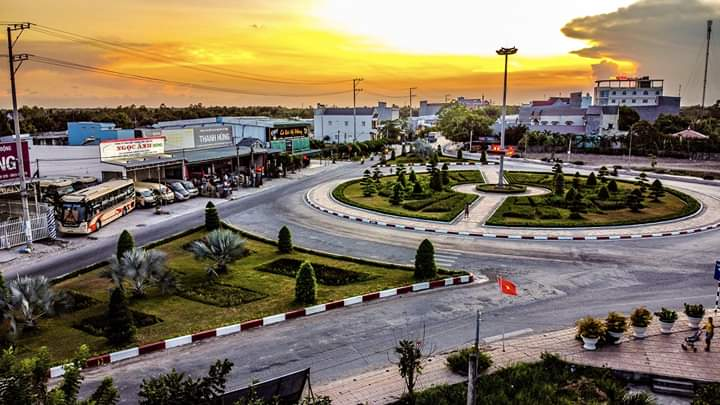
The Hộ Phòng roundabout

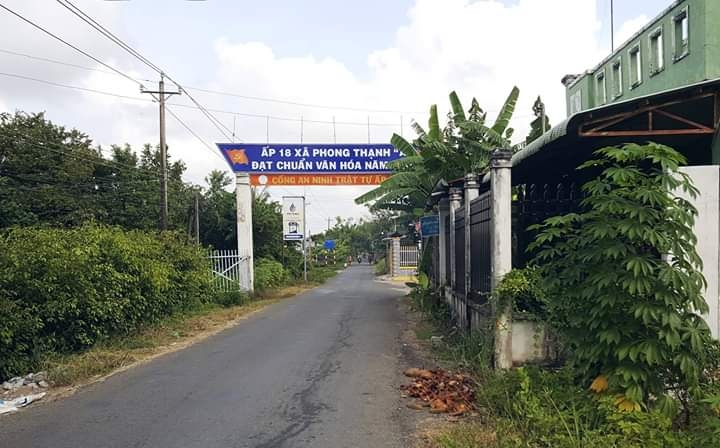
An entrance archway to a residential hamlet
