= Hòa Bình =

Hòa Bình (also written as Hoà Bình, lit. "peace") may refer to:

== Places in Vietnam ==
- Hòa Bình province, a former province in the Northwest region
- Hòa Bình (city), the capital of Hòa Bình Province
- Hòa Bình district, a former rural district of Bạc Liêu Province
- Hòa Bình, Biên Hòa, a former ward of Biên Hòa, Đồng Nai Province.
- Hòa Bình, Gia Lai, a former ward of Ayun Pa
- Hòa Bình, Bạc Liêu, a former township and capital of Hòa Bình District
- Hòa Bình, Nghệ An, a former township and capital of Tương Dương District
- Hòa Bình, Hanoi, a former commune of Thường Tín District
- Hòa Bình, Thủy Nguyên, a former commune of Thủy Nguyên District in Haiphong
- Hòa Bình, Vĩnh Bảo, a former commune of Vĩnh Bảo District in Haiphong
- Hòa Bình, Hòa Bình City, a former commune of Hòa Bình City
- Hòa Bình, Kon Tum, a former commune of Kon Tum
- Hòa Bình, An Giang, a former commune of Chợ Mới District, An Giang Province
- Hòa Bình, Bà Rịa–Vũng Tàu, a former commune of Xuyên Mộc District
- Hòa Bình, Đồng Tháp, a former commune of Tam Nông District, Đồng Tháp Province
- Hòa Bình, Bình Gia, a former commune of Bình Gia District in Lạng Sơn Province
- Hòa Bình, Chi Lăng, a former commune of Chi Lăng District in Lạng Sơn Province
- Hòa Bình, Hữu Lũng, a former commune of Hữu Lũng District in Lạng Sơn Province
- Hòa Bình, Văn Quan, a former commune of Văn Quan District in Lạng Sơn Province
- Hòa Bình, Quảng Ninh, a former commune of Hoành Bồ District
- Hòa Bình, Hưng Hà, a former commune of Hưng Hà District in Thái Bình Province
- Hòa Bình, Kiến Xương, a former commune of Kiến Xương District in Thái Bình Province
- Hòa Bình, Vũ Thư, a former commune of Vũ Thư District in Thái Bình Province
- Hòa Bình, Thái Nguyên, a former commune of Đồng Hỷ District
- Hòa Bình, Ho Chi Minh City, a ward of Ho Chi Minh City established from the former District 11
- Hòa Bình, Phú Thọ, a ward of Phú Thọ Province
- Hòa Bình, Vĩnh Long, a commune of Vĩnh Long Province

== Institutions ==
- Hòa Bình Theater, a music venue in Ho Chi Minh City
- Hòa Bình Cultural Center, a culture and arts complex in Ho Chi Minh City
  - C30 Hòa Bình Theatre

== Film ==
- Hoa-Binh (film), a 1970 French film

== Other uses ==
- Hòa Bình 1, a commune of Tây Hòa District
- Hòa Bình Thạnh, a commune of Châu Thành District, An Giang Province
- Hòa Bình Dam, the second largest hydroelectric dam in Vietnam
- Hoabinhian, prehistoric cultures in Southeast Asia characterized by flaked stone and cobble artifacts

== See also ==
- Heping (disambiguation), the Chinese cognate
