= Hồng Dân district =

Coordinates: 9.417°N 105.417°E

Hồng Dân district Huyện Hồng Dân
- District
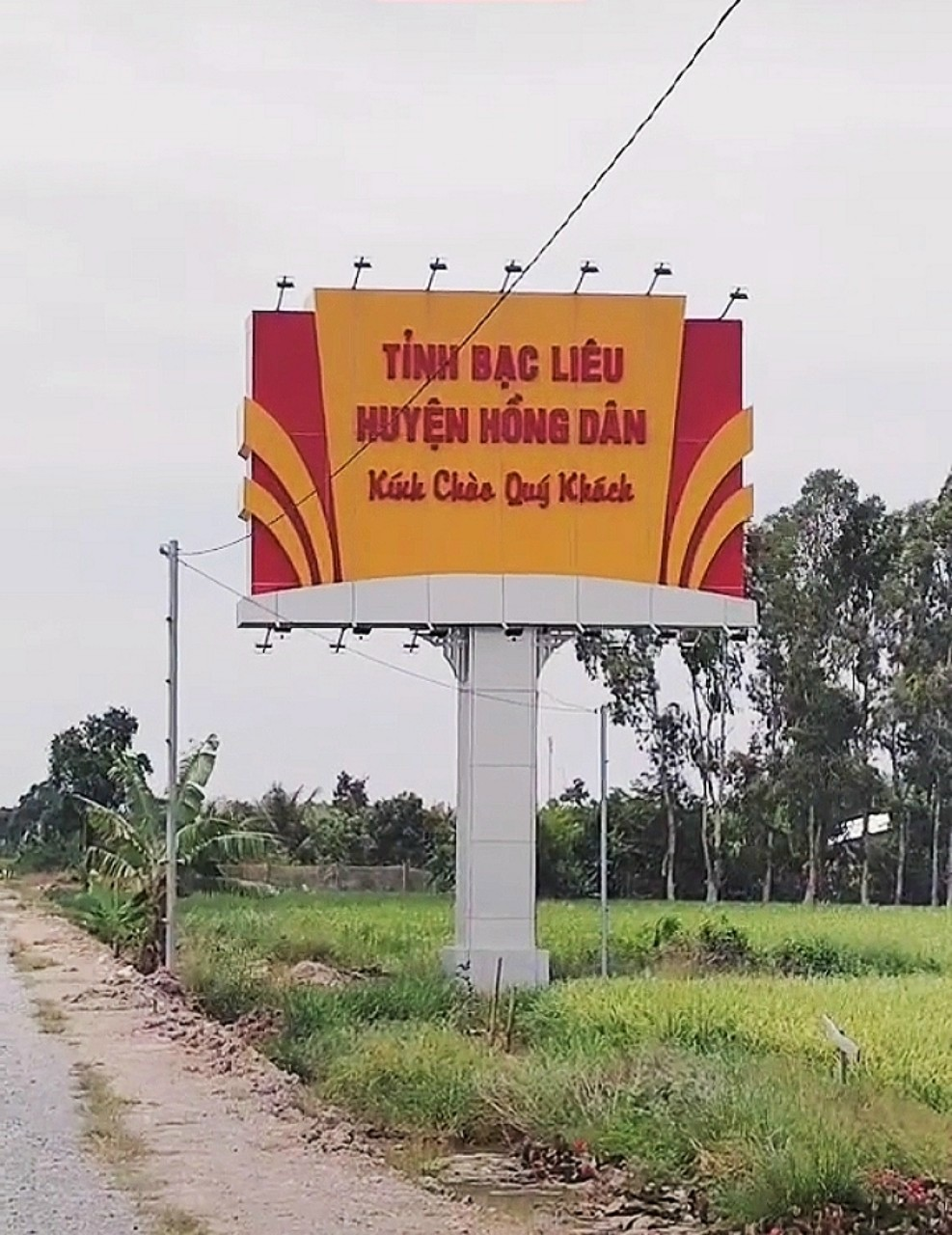
- The entrance gate to Hong Dan district on the Quan Lo – Phung Hiep National Highway.

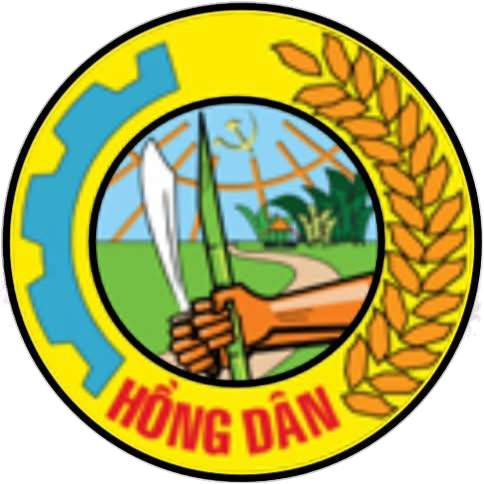
- Seal

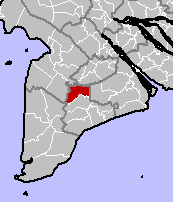
- Location in Bạc Liêu province
- Country: Vietnam
- Province: Bạc Liêu
- Capital: Ngan Dừa

Area
  - Total: 164 sq mi (424 km^{2})

Population (2003)
  - Total: 95,182
- Time zone: UTC+7 (Indochina Time)

Hồng Dân was a former rural district (huyện) of Bạc Liêu province (Now Cà Mau province) in the Mekong Delta region of Vietnam. As of 2003 the district had a population of 95,182. The district covered an area of 424 km^{2} (164 sq mi). The district capital lies at Ngan Dừa.

On June 16, 2025, the Standing Committee of the National Assembly issued Resolution No. 1685/NQ-UBTVQH15. The district was dissolved and new wards were rearranged from the district.

== Administrative divisions ==
The district is divided administratively into 1 township, Ngan Dừa (capital), and the following communes: Vĩnh Lộc, Vĩnh Lộc A, Lộc Ninh, Ninh Thạnh Lợi, Ninh Thạnh Lợi A, Ninh Hòa, Ninh Quới and Ninh Quới A.

== Economy ==
The proportions of GDP by districts are as follows: Agriculture 73%, industry and construction 13%, trade and services 14%.

The value of agricultural production increased on average 5-6% annually. Industrial and handicraft industry increased from 14-15%. The total income is VND 250.386 billion (VND 2,763,000 per capita - equivalent to 184 USD).

The district also has 8,000 ha dedicated to shrimp farming, fish 400 ha, pineapple 2,570 ha, sugar cane 1,022 ha, and coconut 1,505 ha.

Traditional handicrafts also employ more than 10,000 in professions such as knitting, textile making, lace trade and carpentry.
