= Gành Hào =

Gành Hào Phường Gành Hào
- Ward
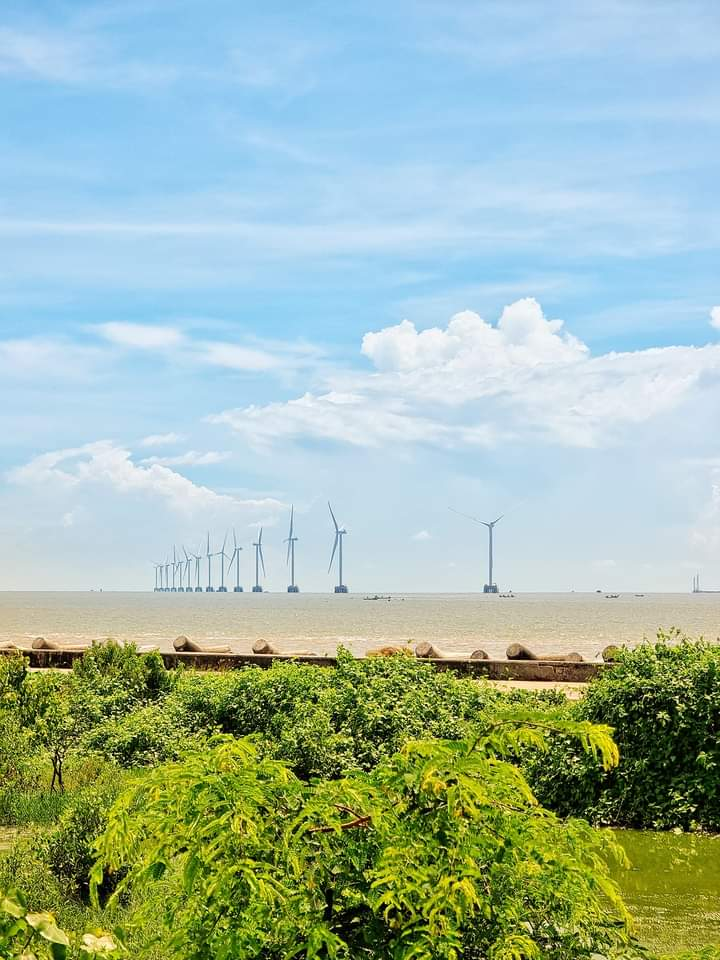
- A glimpse of the Gành Hào estuary

- Location in Vietnam
- Coordinates: 9°1′18″N 105°25′15″E
- Country: Vietnam
- Province: Cà Mau
- Establish: June 16, 2025

Area
  - Total: 84.65 km^{2} (32.68 sq mi)

Population 2025
  - Total: 31.552 people
  - Density: 0.3727/km^{2} (0.9654/sq mi)
- Time zone: UTC+07:00 (Indochina Time)

Gành Hào is a ward of Cà Mau Province, in south-western Vietnam.

The Standing Committee of the National Assembly issued Resolution No. 1655/NQ-UBTVQH15 on the rearrangement of commune-level administrative units of Cà Mau Province in 2025 (the resolution takes effect from 16 June 2025). Accordingly, Gành Hào Commune was established in Cà Mau Province on the basis of the entire natural area of 13.40 km² with a population of 17,587 people of Gành Hào Township, and the entire natural area of 71.25 km² with a population of 13,965 people of Long Điền Tây Commune, Đông Hải District, Bạc Liêu Province.

== Geography ==
Gành Hào Commune is situated as follows:

- To the east, it borders Long Điền Commune.
- To the west, it borders Tân Thuận Commune, with the Gành Hào River serving as the boundary.
- To the south, it borders the East Sea.
- To the north, it borders An Trạch Commune and Định Thành Commune.

Gành Hào Commune covers an area of 84.65 km²; as of 2024, it has a population of 31,552 people, resulting in a population density of 0 people/km².

== Administration divisions ==
Gành Hào Commune is divided into 13 hamlets: 1, 2, 3, 4, 5, An Điền, Bình Điền, Canh Điền, Lam Điền, Lập Điền, Thanh Hải, Thuận Điền, and Vinh Điền.

== History ==
In 1964, Gành Hào hamlet belonged to Long Điền commune, Long Thủy district, Giá Rai district, Bạc Liêu province. The hamlet was named this way because it was located on the banks of the Gành Hào river.

Before 1975, Gành Hào town was Ngọc Điền hamlet, Long Điền Tây commune.

On September 20, 1975, the Politburo issued Resolution No. 245-NQ/TW Regarding the merger of Bạc Liêu province, Cà Mau province and two districts An Biên and Vĩnh Thuận (excluding Dong Yen and Tay Yen communes) of Rạch Giá province into a new province, the name of the new province and the location of the provincial capital will be proposed by the local authorities.

On December 20, 1975, the Politburo issued Resolution No. 19/NQ regarding the merger of Bạc Liêu and Cà Mau provinces into a new province. The name of the new province and the location of the provincial capital will be proposed by the local authorities.

On February 24, 1976, the Provisional Revolutionary Government of the Republic of South Vietnam issued Decree No. 3/NQ/1976 Regarding the merger of Bạc Liêu province and Cà Mau province into a new province, named Bạc Liêu – Cà Mau province. Ganh Hao town and Long Dien Tay commune belong to Giá Rai district, Bạc Liêu – Cà Mau province.

On March 10, 1976, the Government issued a Resolution on renaming several provinces, establishing Minh Hải province based on renaming Bạc Liêu province – Cà Mau province. At that time, Ganh Hao town and Long Dien Tay commune belonged to Gia Rai district, Minh Hai province.

On January 10, 1978, Ganh Hao town was established with an area of approximately 1,500 hectares, divided into 5 zones: I, II, III, IV, V; of which zone V is Luu Hoa Thanh hamlet, now part of Tan Thuan commune.

On December 29, 1978, the Government Council issued Decision No. 326-CP. Accordingly, Gành Hào town belongs to Giá Rai.

On April 4, 1979, the Government Council issued Decision No. 142-CP Regarding the establishment of Gành Hào town in Giá Rai district, with the following administrative boundaries:

- East: bordering the East Sea
- West: bordering Gành Hào – Hộ Phòng canal
- South: bordering Tân Thuận commune, Đầm Dơi district
- North: bordering Long Điền Tây and Long Hải communes.

In 1989, area V was separated and assigned to Tân Thuận commune in Đầm Dơi district, and the area of the town was included. Only 345 hectares remained.

On April 13, 1991, the Government's Organization and Personnel Committee issued Decision No. 183/QD-TCCP on adjusting the boundaries of some communes in Gia Rai district, Minh Hai province. This decision involved merging Dien Hai commune and Long Dien Hai commune in Giá Rai district into Long Dien Tay commune.

In 1994, a portion of Thanh Hai hamlet and Binh Dien hamlet of Long Dien Tay commune was merged, so the area of Ganh Hao town was 1,233 hectares.

On November 6, 1996, the National Assembly issued Resolution regarding the division of Minh Hải province into Bạc Liêu province and Cà Mau province. At that time, Ganh Hao town and Long Dien Tay commune belonged to Gia Rai district, Bac Lieu province.

On December 24, 2001, the Government of Vietnam issued Decree No. 98/2001/ND-CP Regarding:

- Establishment of Đông Hải in Bạc Liêu based on a part of Giá Rai.
- Transfer of Ganh Hao town and Long Dien Tay commune from Giá Rai to the newly established Đông Hải for management.
- Ganh Hao town became the district capital of Đông Hải district.

On August 1, 2008, the Government issued Decree No. 85/2008/ND-CP. Regarding the establishment of Điền Hải commune in Đông Hải district based on the adjustment of 3,400.04 hectares of natural area and 9,408 inhabitants of Long Dien Tay commune.

After the administrative boundary adjustment, Long Dien Tay commune has a remaining natural area of 7,687.07 hectares and 11,023 inhabitants.

In early 2023, Đông Hải district relocated its district seat from Ganh Hao town to the new administrative area of Đông Hải district on Provincial Road 980 (Gia Rai – Ganh Hao), Go Cat hamlet, Dien Hai commune.

As of December 31, 2024:

- Ganh Hao town has 5 hamlets: 1, 2, 3, 4, 5.
- Long Dien Tay commune has 8 hamlets: An Dien, Binh Dien, Canh Dien, Lam Dien, Lap Dien, Thanh Hai, Thuan Dien, Vinh Dien.

On June 12, 2025, the National Assembly issued Resolution No. 202/2025/QH15 regarding the arrangement of provincial-level administrative units (resolution effective from June 12, 2025). Accordingly, the province of Bạc Liêu will be merged into the province of Cà Mau.

June 16, 2025:

- The National Assembly issued Resolution No. 203/2025/QH15 Regarding the amendment and supplementation of some articles of the Constitution of the Socialist Republic of Vietnam. Accordingly, the operation of district-level administrative units nationwide will end from July 1, 2025.
- The Standing Committee of the National Assembly issued Resolution No. 1655/NQ-UBTVQH15 Regarding the reorganization of commune-level administrative units in Ca Mau province in 2025 (resolution effective from June 16, 2025). Accordingly, Ganh Hao commune is established in Cà Mau province based on the entire 13.40 km² natural area and population of 17,587 people of Ganh Hao town and the entire 71.25 km² natural area and population of 13,965 people of Long Dien Tay commune in Đông Hải district, Bạc Liêu province.

Ganh Hao commune has a natural area of 84.65 km² and a population of 31,552 people.

== Culture ==
Although the Ông Gành Hào Mausoleum lacks elaborate or complex architecture, its true value lies in the numerous skeletons of "Ông" fish—some dating back hundreds of years—that are preserved within its walls. Annually, on the 9th and 10th days of the third lunar month, local residents organize the Nghinh Ông Festival to pay tribute to the benevolence of this species—a fish revered by coastal communities as the "Great General of the Southern Sea," a deity believed to always assist fishermen in navigating treacherous waves and fierce winds during storms. Streets in Gành Hào:

- 19/5 Street
- 1/3 Street
- Hamlet 1 Street
- Hamlet 2 Street
- Ông Sắc Street (Hamlet 2)
- Hamlet 3 Street
- Hamlet 4 Street
- Hamlet 5 Street
- Street No. 2
- Street No. 4
- Street No. 5
- Street No. 8 (Hương Lộ)
- Street No. 10 (Lò Heo)
- Bờ Kè Street
- Phan Ngọc Hiển Street
- Ngọc Điền Street
- Lê Thị Riêng Street

== Images ==
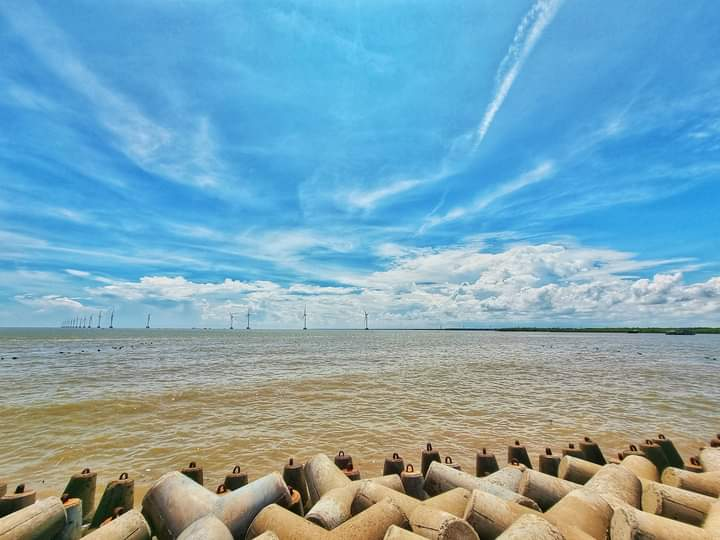
A corner of the Gành Hào embankment

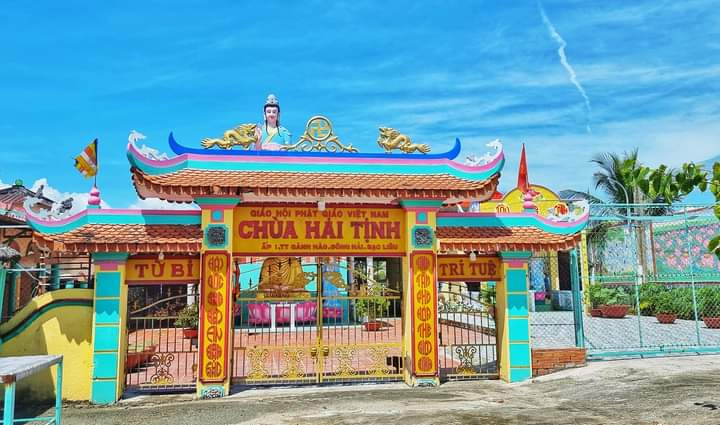
Hải Tịnh Pagoda

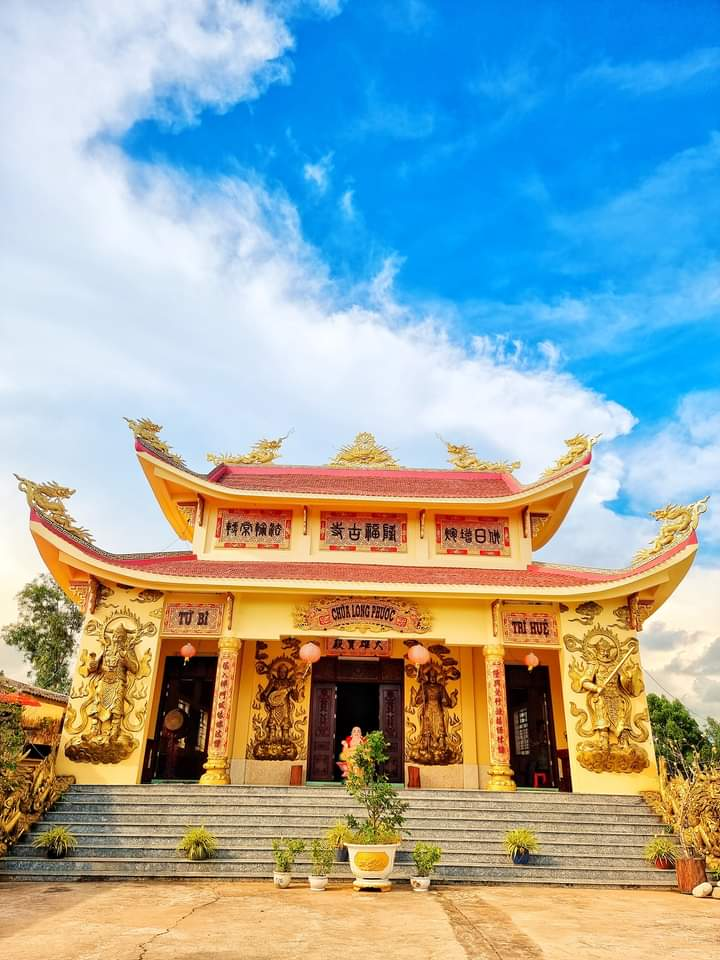
Long Phước Pagoda

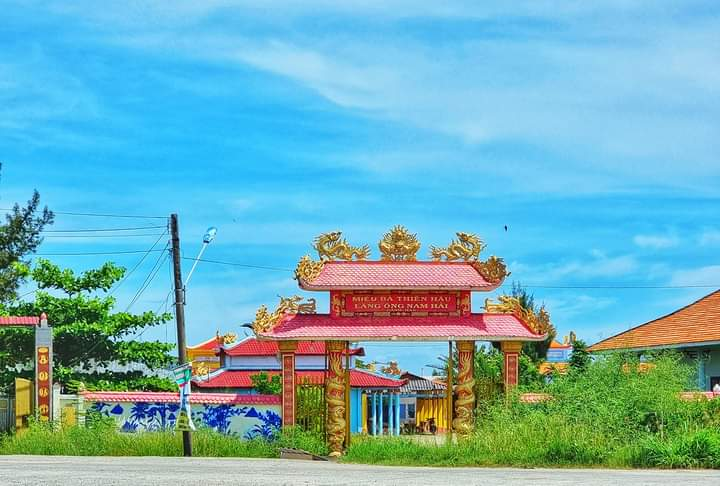
Lady Thiên Hậu Temple – Lord Nam Hải Mausoleum

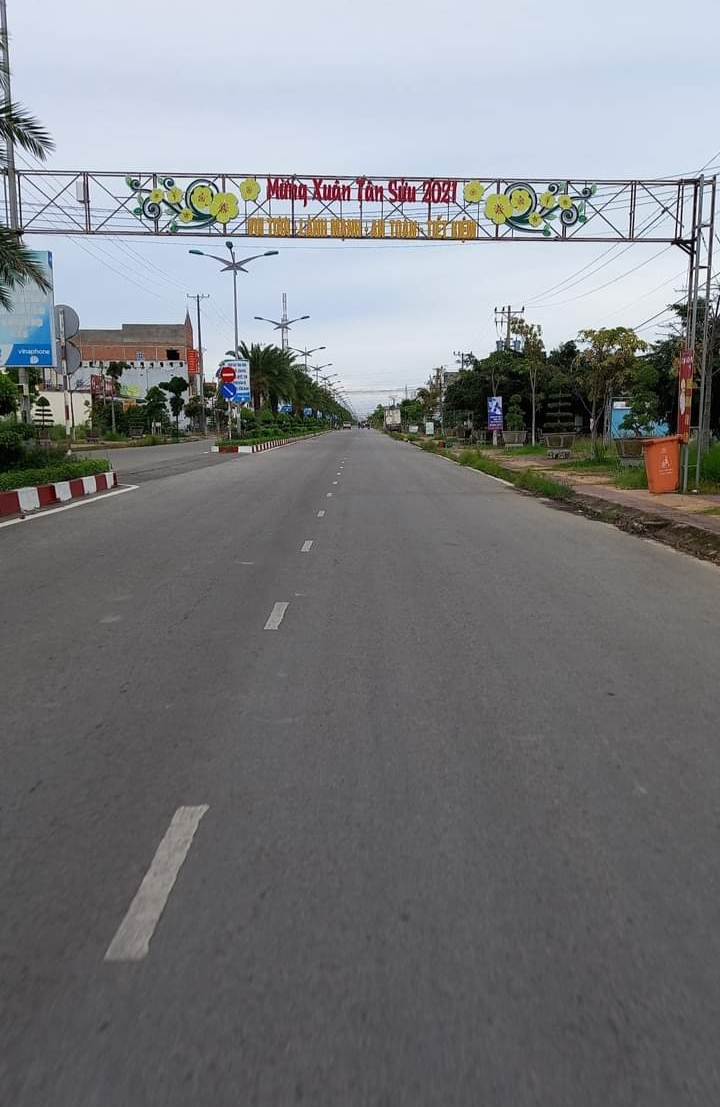
The road leading to the center of Gành Hào.

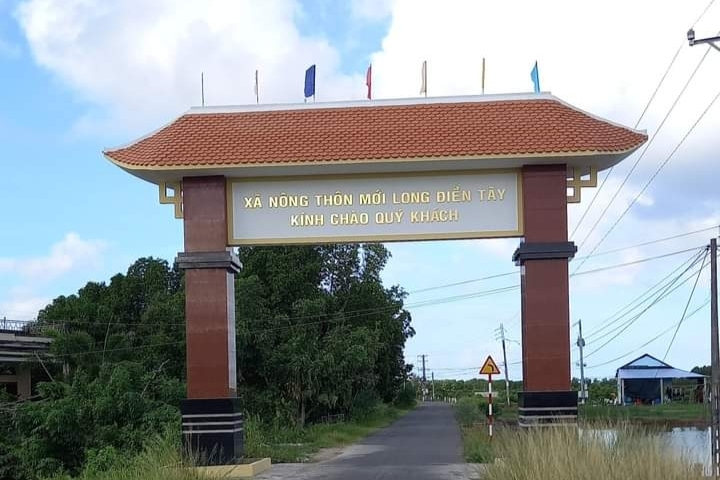
The Old Entrance Gate of Long Điền Tây Commune
