= Gia Rai =

Gia Rai or Giá Rai may refer to:

- Giá Rai: ward of Cà Mau province
- Giá Rai: former district-level town of former Bạc Liêu province.

== Other ==
- The Vietnamese name for the Jarai people.
