= Hiệp Thành =

- Ward
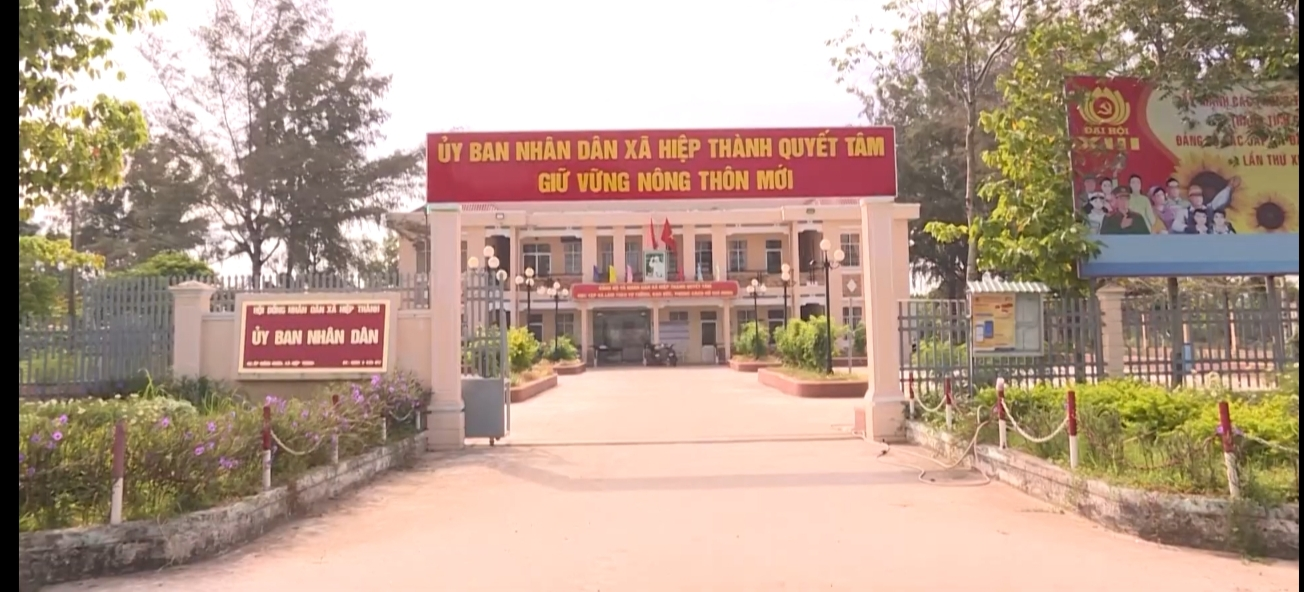
- Headquarters of the Hiệp Thành Ward People's Committee
- Interactive map of Hiệp Thành
- Coordinates: 9°14′36″N 105°46′08″E
- Country: Vietnam
- Province: Cà Mau
- Establish: June 16, 2025

Area
  - Total: 134.24 km^{2} (51.83 sq mi)

Population 2025
  - Total: 38.370 people
  - Density: 0.28583/km^{2} (0.74030/sq mi)
- Time zone: UTC+07:00 (Indochina Time)
- Website: hiepthanh.camau.gov.vn

Hiệp Thành is a ward (phường) of Cà Mau Province, Vietnam.

On 16 June 2025, the Standing Committee of the National Assembly issued Resolution No. 1655/NQ-UBTVQH15 on the rearrangement of commune-level administrative units of Cà Mau Province in 2025 (the resolution takes effect from 16 June 2025). Accordingly, Hiệp Thành Ward was established in Cà Mau Province on the basis of the entire 29.05 km² of natural area and a population of 11,864 people of Nhà Mát Ward, the entire 37.29 km² of natural area and a population of 9,825 people of Hiệp Thành Commune, and the entire 67.90 km² of natural area and a population of 16,681 people of Vĩnh Trạch Đông Commune, all formerly belonging to Bạc Liêu City, Bạc Liêu Province.

== Geography ==
Hiệp Thành Ward is situated in the following geographical location:

- To the east, it borders the city of Cần Thơ.
- To the west, it borders Vĩnh Hậu Commune.
- To the south, it borders the East Sea.
- To the north, it borders Bạc Liêu Ward and Vĩnh Trạch Ward.

Hiệp Thành Ward covers an area of 134.24 km²; as of 2024, it has a population of 38,370 people, resulting in a population density of 0 people/km².

== Administration ==
Hiep Thanh Ward is divided into 16 residential clusters: Bien Dong A, Bien Dong B, Bien Tay A, Bien Tay B, Bo Tay, Chom Xoai, Dau Lo, Dau Lo A, Giong Giua, Giong Giua A, Giong Giua B, Giong Nhan, Giong Nhan A, Kinh Te, Nha Mat, and Xom Lam.

== History ==
After 1975, Vinh Loi commune belonged to Bạc Liêu town (city), Bạc Liêu province.

On September 20, 1975, the Politburo issued Resolution No. 245-NQ/TW Regarding the merger of Bạc Liêu province, Cà Mau province and two districts An Biên district and Vĩnh Thuận district (excluding Đông Yên and Tây Yên communes) of Rạch Giá province into a new province, the name of the new province and the location of the provincial capital will be proposed by the local authorities.

On December 20, 1975, the Politburo issued Resolution No. 19/NQ regarding the merger of Bạc Liêu and Cà Mau provinces into a new province. The name of the new province and the location of the provincial capital will be proposed by the local authorities.

On February 24, 1976, the Provisional Revolutionary Government of the Republic of South Vietnam issued Decree No. 3/NQ/1976 Regarding the merger of Bạc Liêu province and Cà Mau province into a new province, named Bạc Liêu – Cà Mau province. Vĩnh Lợi commune belongs to Bạc Liêu town, Bạc Liêu – Cà Mau province.

On March 10, 1976, the Government issued a Resolution on renaming several provinces, concerning:

- The establishment of Minh Hải province on the basis of renaming Bạc Liêu province – Cà Mau province.
- The renaming of Bạc Liêu town to Minh Hải town.
- Vĩnh Lợi commune belongs to Minh Hải town, Minh Hải province.

On December 29, 1978, the Government Council issued Decision No. 326-CP. Accordingly, Vinh Loi commune belongs to Minh Hải, Minh Hải province.

On July 25, 1979, the Council of Ministers issued Decision No. 275-CP on dividing Vinh Loi commune into Vinh Hiep commune and Vinh Thanh commune.

On May 17, 1984, the Council of Ministers issued Decision No. 75-HĐBT on renaming Minh Hai town to Bac Lieu town in Minh Hai province. At that time, Vinh Hiep commune and Vinh Thanh commune belonged to Bac Lieu town.

On February 14, 1987, the Council of Ministers issued Decision No. 33B-HDBT on the establishment of Hiep Thanh commune in Bac Lieu town on the basis of Vinh Hiep and Vinh Thanh communes.

Hiep Thanh commune has 4,405 hectares of land and 9,735 inhabitants.

On November 6, 1996, the National Assembly issued Resolution regarding the division of Minh Hải province into Bạc Liêu province and Cà Mau province. At that time, Hiệp Thành commune belonged to Bạc Liêu town, Bạc Liêu province.

On August 25, 1999, the Government issued Decree No. 82/1999/ND-CP regarding the establishment of Vinh Trach Dong commune in Bac Lieu town based on 4,656.97 hectares of natural area and 9,632 inhabitants of Thuan Hoa commune.

On December 24, 2003, the Government issued Decree No. 166/2003/ND-CP Regarding the establishment of Nha Mat ward in Bac Lieu town based on the adjustment of 2,439 hectares of natural area and 9,237 inhabitants of Hiệp Thành commune.

After the administrative boundary adjustment, Hiep Thanh commune retains 2,512.35 hectares of natural area and 5,504 inhabitants.

On August 27, 2010, the Government issued Decision No. 32/NQ-CP Regarding the establishment of Bạc Liêu City in Bạc Liêu Province. Nha Mat Ward, Hiệp Thành Commune, and Vĩnh Trạch Đông Commune are under the jurisdiction of Bạc Liêu City.

As of December 31, 2024:

- Nha Mat Ward has 6 hamlets: Bo Tay, Chom Xoai, Dau Lo, Dau Lo A, Kinh Te, Nha Mat.
- Hiep Thanh Commune has 4 hamlets: Giong Giua, Giong Nhan, Giong Nhan A, Xom Lam.
- Vinh Trach Dong commune has 6 hamlets: Giong Giua A, Giong Giua B, Bien Dong A, Bien Dong B, Bien Tay A, Bien Tay B.

On June 12, 2025, the National Assembly issued Resolution No. 202/2025/QH15 regarding the arrangement of provincial-level administrative units (resolution effective from June 12, 2025). Accordingly, the province of Bạc Liêu will be merged into the province of Cà Mau.

On June 16, 2025, the Standing Committee of the National Assembly issued Resolution No. 1655/NQ-UBTVQH15 Regarding the reorganization of commune-level administrative units in Ca Mau province in 2025 (resolution effective from June 16, 2025). Accordingly, Hiep Thanh ward is established in Ca Mau province based on the entire 29.05 km² of natural area and a population of 11,864 people of Nha Mat ward; the entire 37.29 km² of natural area and a population of 9,825 people of Hiep Thanh commune; and the entire 67.90 km² of natural area and a population of 16,681 people of Vinh Trach Dong commune in Bạc Liêu city, Bạc Liêu province.

Hiệp Thành Ward has a natural area of 134.24 km² and a population of 38,370 people.

== Socio-economic ==
The population of the commune, according to statistics from April 2019, is 8,132 people, including 6,221 Kinh people, 1,203 Hoa people, and 700 Khmer people. Most residents in the commune live by aquaculture and fishing. In addition, they also grow chives, and the commune has a specialty: chive cake.

Bac Lieu Province is aiming to make Bac Lieu the center of the shrimp industry nationwide, developing the "Bac Lieu Shrimp" brand and promoting it to foreign markets.Bac Lieu High-Tech Agricultural Zone for Shrimp Development was built according to this project. The Prime Minister of Vietnam issued Decision No. 694/QD-TTg on May 24, 2017, establishing and promulgating the operating regulations for this agricultural zone with a scale of 418.91 hectares, located in Hiep Thanh commune.

Average per capita income is 26 million dong/person/year. In August 2019, the commune still had 65 poor households, accounting for 3.2%.

== Culture and tourism ==
Ancient Longan Orchard of Bac Lieu

In the ward, there are ancient longan orchards hundreds of years old, located 6 km from the center of Bac Lieu ward, which are tourist attractions. The gardens, collectively known as the "Ancient Longan Gardens of Bac Lieu," stretch across Hiep Thanh Ward and the neighboring Vĩnh Trạch Đông Ward. The gardens extend 11 km along the Cao Van Lau asphalt road in the east, running towards the sea.

The longan variety was brought from China by a local man named Truong Hung. The longan is grown on sandy soil. The total area of longan trees was 300 ha (3 km²) in 2000, gradually decreasing to only 100 ha. In the commune, there is an ancient longan tree over 300 years old. Bac Lieu province implemented the "Preservation of Ancient Longan Trees Associated with Tourism Development" project in 2012, surveying 1,190 longan trees aged 70 to 100 years, planning them into 3 clusters, with the goal of preserving ancient longan orchards while developing local tourism.

Bac Lieu Wind Power Plant

The Bac Lieu Wind Power Plant, often called "Wind Farm" by the locals, is located in Bien Dong A hamlet and has a capacity of 100 MW, consisting of 62 turbine towers. From June 2013 to March 2020, it operated. has contributed 1 billion kWh to the national power grid. This is Vietnam's first offshore wind power plant and the largest in the country, built since 2010, is still expanding, located on the coast, 10 km from the center of Bac Lieu province towards the southeast. Each turbine tower is 80m high, 4m in diameter, weighs over 200 tons and is made of stainless steel.

Nha Mat Tourist Area

Nha Mat Tourist Area is located near the sea, 7 km from the center of Bac Lieu province, is a tourist area invested with capital of over 2,500 billion VND, has the largest artificial beach in the Mekong Delta region. The area covers more than 20 hectares, includes 3 zones: Commercial and hotel zone, Tourism and service zone, Park and public service zone. The artificial beach, named Tien Rong, has a water surface and sandy beach area of approximately 10,000 m². The area officially started operating in 2014.

This is also the location for the Traditional Music and Singing Festival.

The tourist area is located near Quan Am Buddha Statue.

Quan Am Buddha Statue

Quan Am Buddha Statue (also known as Mother of the South Sea) is the name of a temple belonging to the Northern Buddhism. This is a prominent cultural and spiritual landmark of the province, featuring an 11-meter-tall statue of Bodhisattva Avalokiteshvara, standing in an open space overlooking the East Sea.

Bac Lieu Bird Garden

Bac Lieu Bird Garden, also known as Bac Lieu Bird Sanctuary, is a remaining patch of forest from the former vast mangrove forest. The bird sanctuary covers 385 hectares (nearly 4 km²), of which 19 hectares are primary forest.

The sanctuary has 13 plant communities, including 181 species of higher plants belonging to 145 genera of 60 families; including 23 species representing mangrove forest flora, 16 tree species participating in mangrove forests,...

The garden is home to approximately 46 species of birds, such as the lotus heron, the small stork, the grey pelican, the Indian stork, the egret, the red-bellied short-tailed stork, and the red-bellied heron. Some of these are listed in the Red Book. There are also 150 other animal species, including 58 species of fish, 7 species of frogs and toads, 10 species of mammals, and 8 species of reptiles.

Truc Lam Bac Lieu Zen Monastery

Truc Lam Bac Lieu Zen Monastery is located on Cao Van Lau Street, 8 km from the center of Bac Lieu city towards the sea, Built since 2016, on an area of 18 hectares. The construction follows the architecture of the Ly and Tran dynasties. The entire structure is made of ironwood and Thanh Hoa stone. After 3 years of construction, half of the items have been completed. such as: Three-arched gate, Main hall, Ancestral house, Bell tower,...

300-year-old heritage mango tree

In the commune there is an ancient mango tree over 300 years old, the oldest mango tree in the Mekong Delta, has been included in List of Heritage Trees in Vietnam. The mango tree is located 7 km from the center of Bac Lieu city, in Bien Tay B hamlet, about 200m from Siem Can pagoda. The tree is over 15m tall, with a canopy of 300m², a diameter of 1.92m and a circumference of 6.05m. According to historical documents from the Bac Lieu City Culture and Sports Center, mango trees have existed since around 1680.

Xiêm Cán Pagoda

Xiêm Cán Pagoda is located 7 km south of Bac Lieu city center, a prominent architectural landmark of the commune, and a venue for annual Khmer festivals. The pagoda was built in 1887 with an initial area of 4,500 m², The current campus area is 4 hectares, Xiem Can Pagoda is the oldest and largest religious architectural complex in the Mekong Delta region. The pagoda houses a collection of ancient Khmer books written on thick leaves, totaling 70 pages. The main hall, with a height of 36.3m, is considered the tallest in the Khmer pagoda complex in Southern Vietnam.

== Images ==
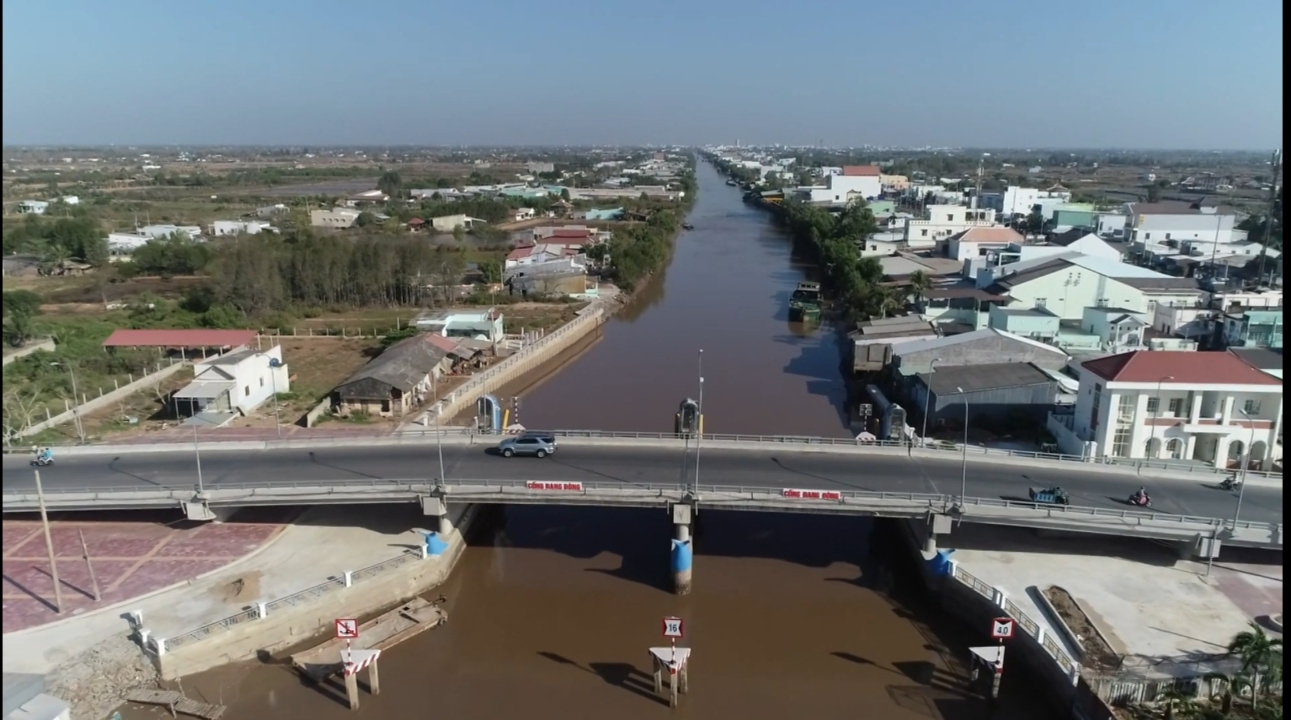
Nhà Mát Sluice

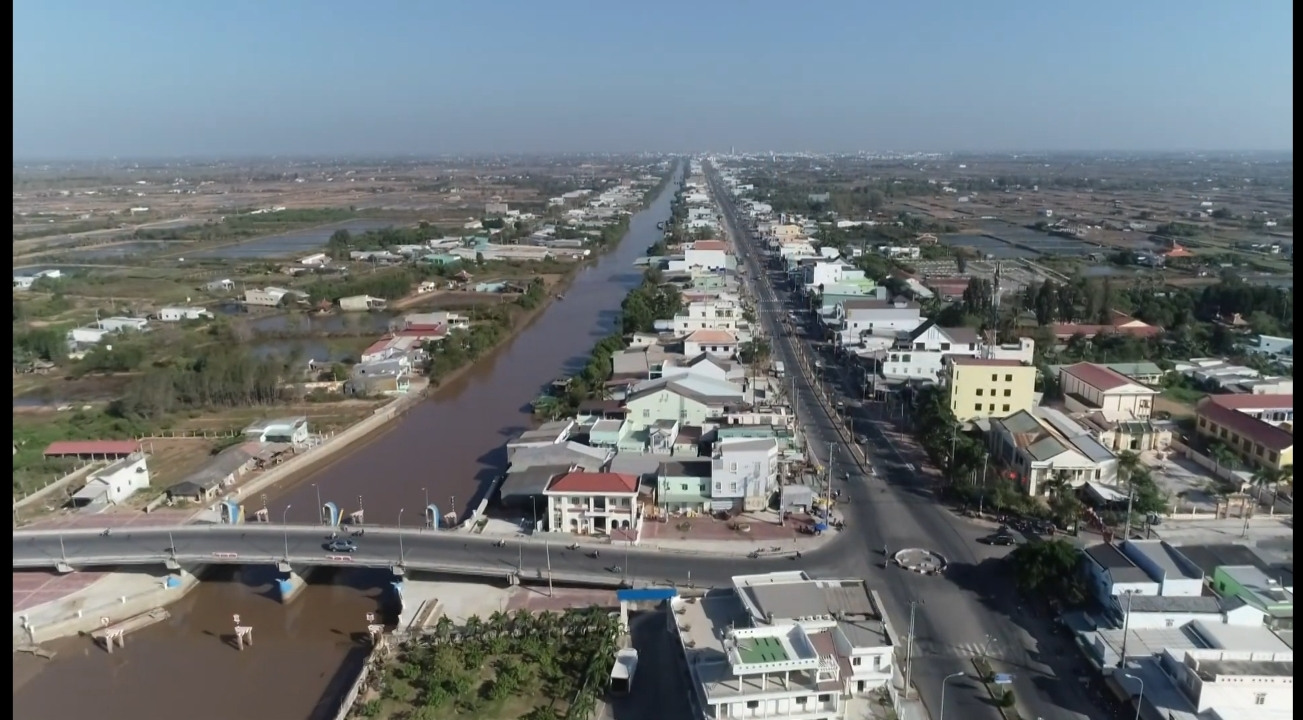
A corner of Nhà Mát

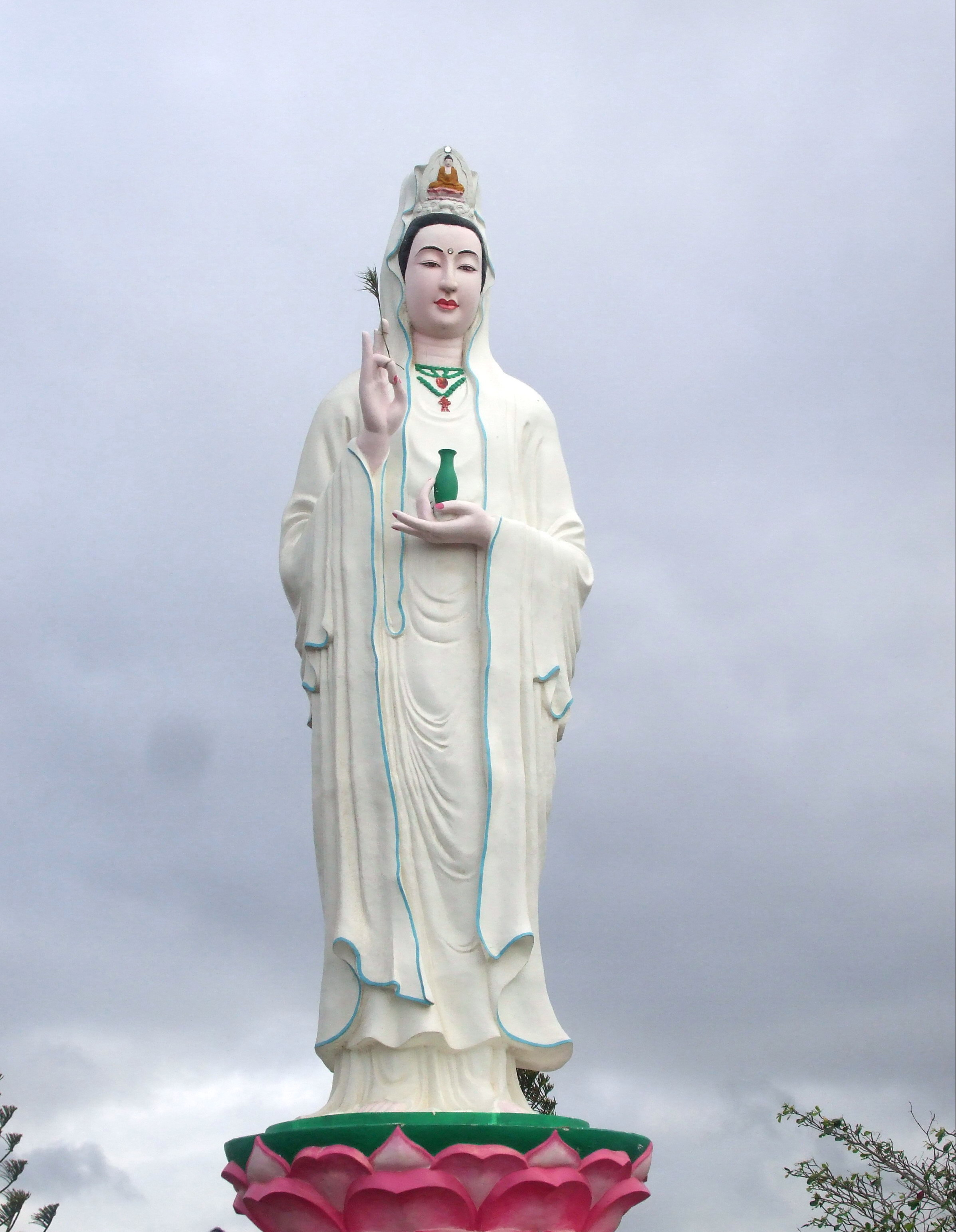
11-meter-tall Statue of Guanyin

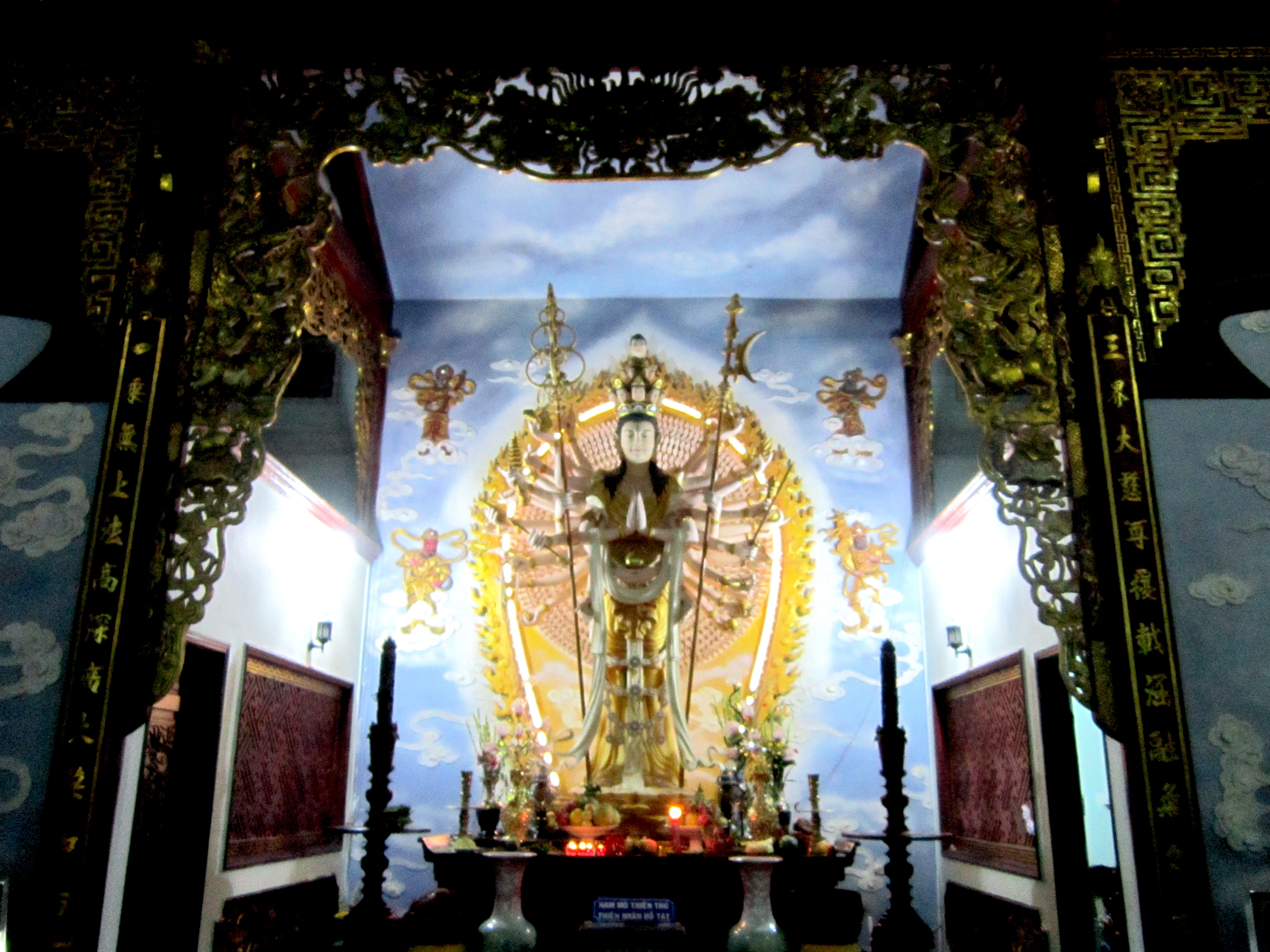
Statue of the Thousand-Armed Guanyin

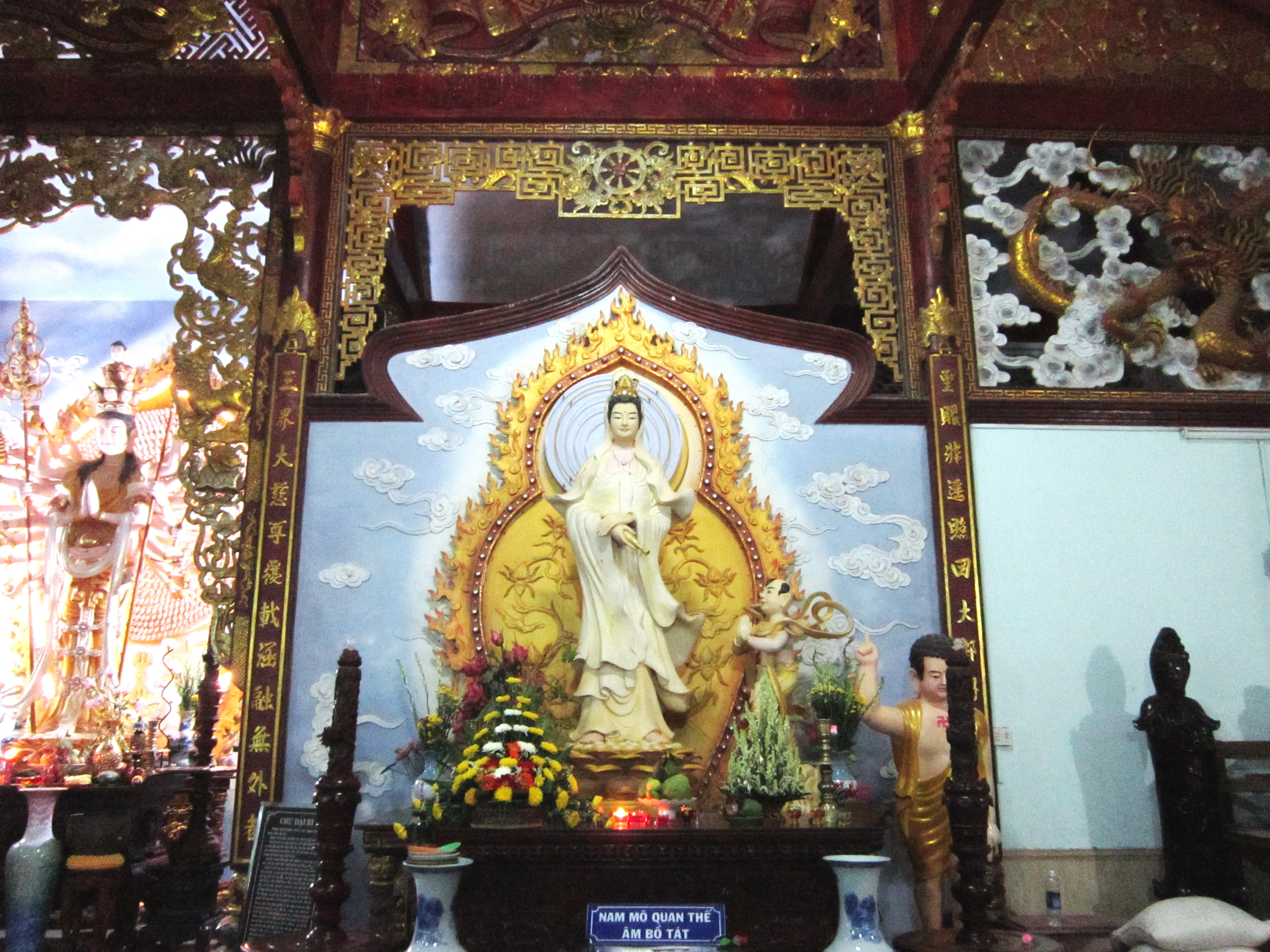
Statue of Guanyin inside the Hall of the Thousand Arms

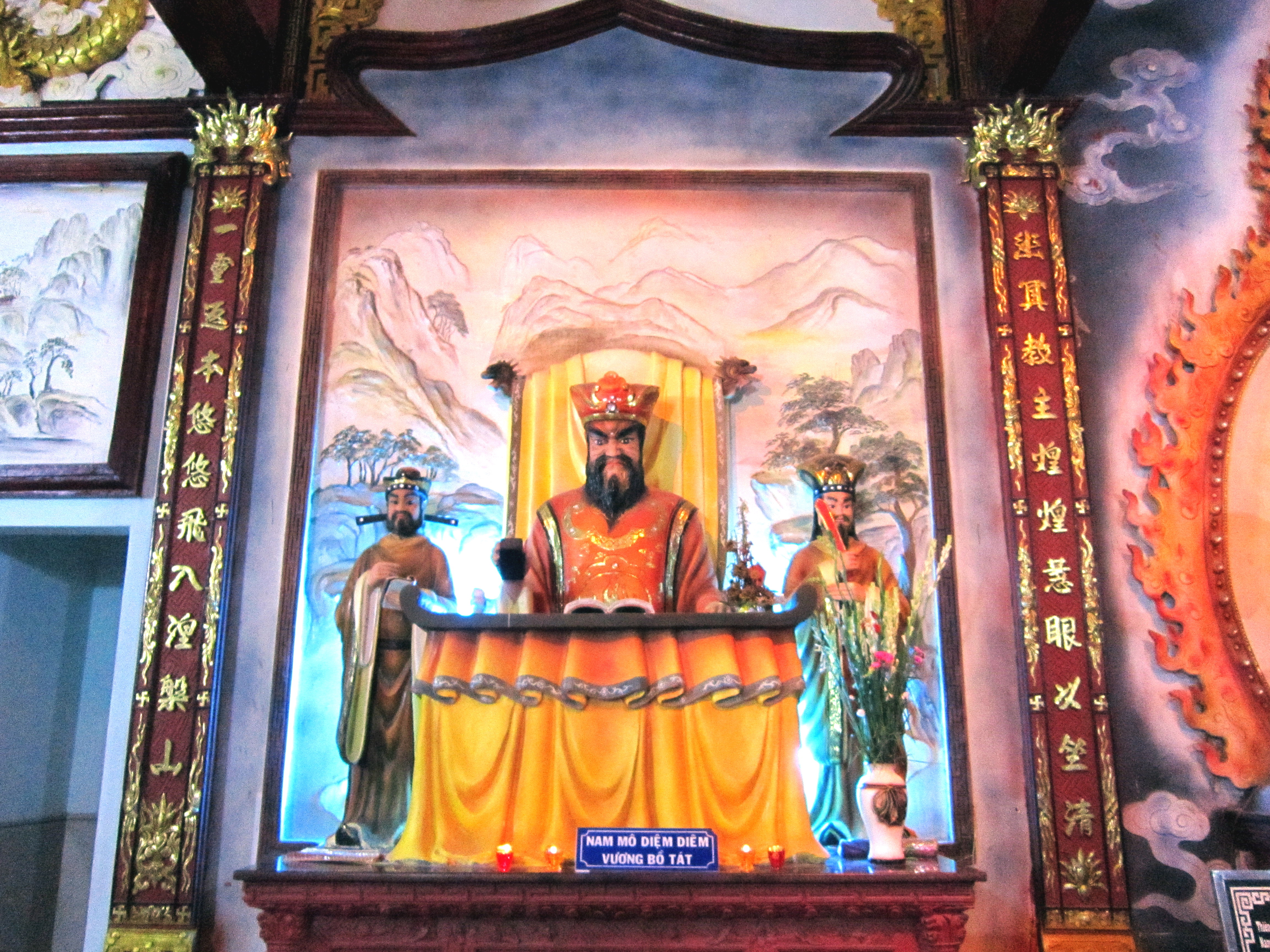
Statue of Yama inside the Hall of Ksitigarbha

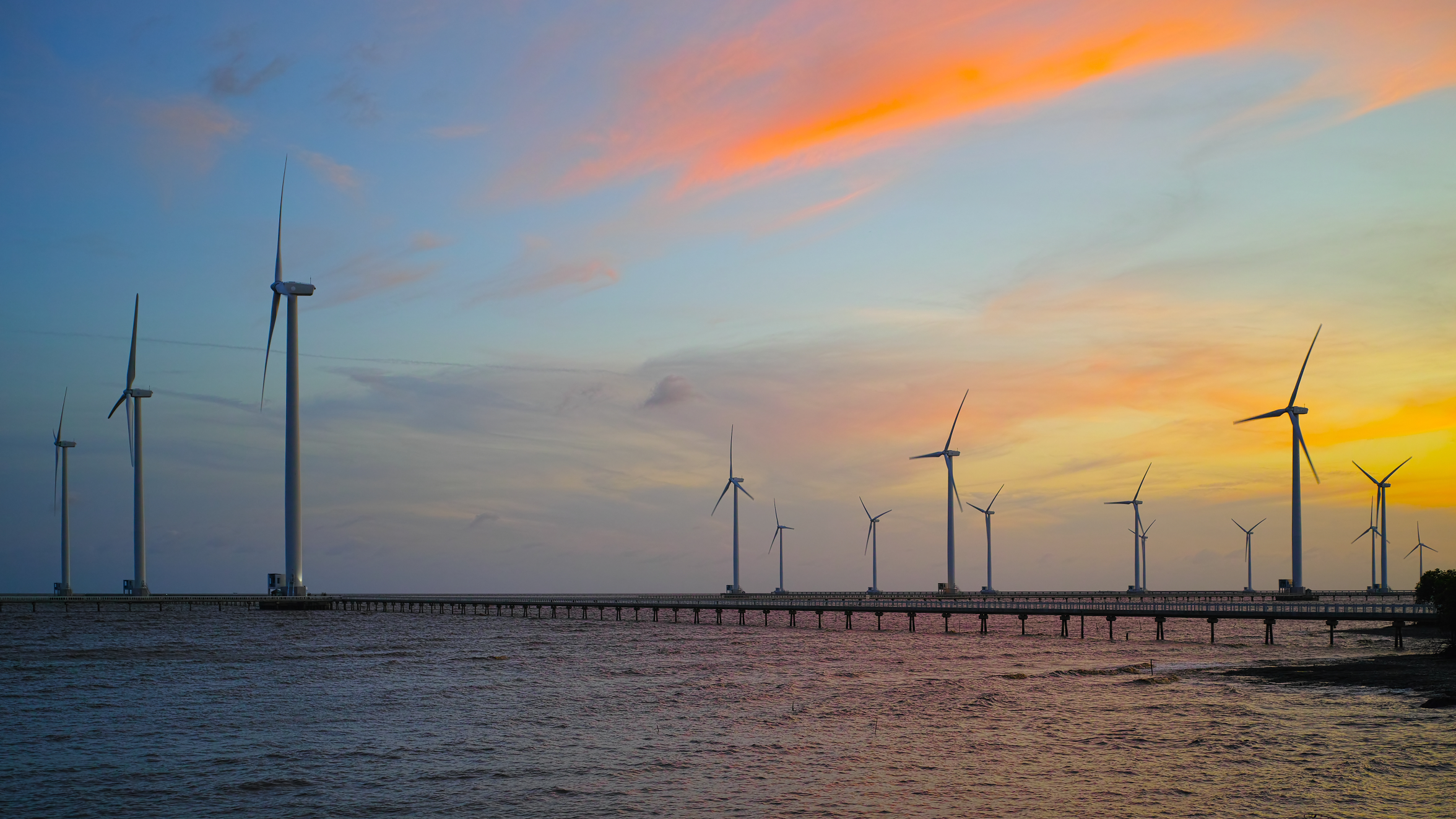
Wind farm

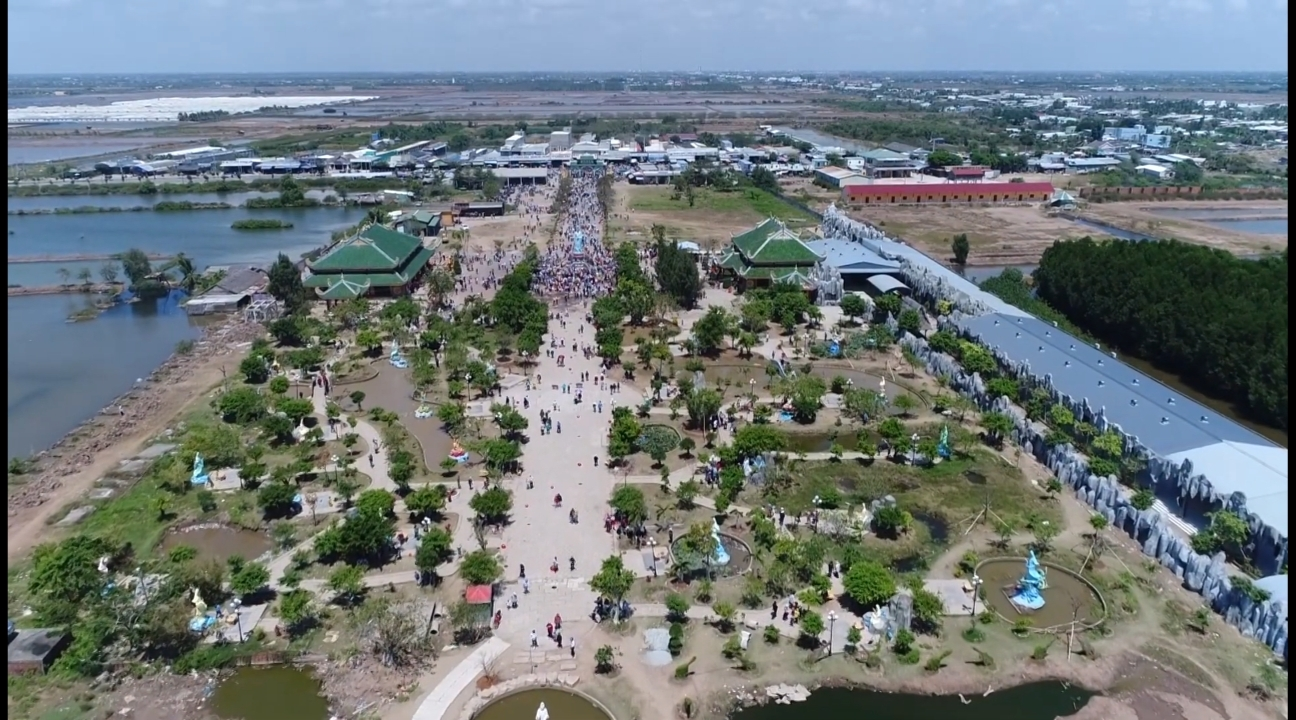
Panoramic view of Quán Âm Phật Đài
