= Phước Long district =

Phước Long district Huyện Phước Long
- District
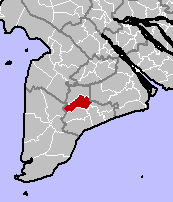
- Location in Bạc Liêu province
- Country: Vietnam
- Province: Bạc Liêu

Area
  - Total: 156.3 sq mi (404.8 km^{2})

Population (2004)
  - Total: 106,000
- Time zone: UTC+7 (Indochina Time)

Phước Long was a rural district (huyện) of Bạc Liêu province (Now Cà Mau province) in the Mekong Delta region at the southern tip of Vietnam. The district was once a part of the older Minh Hải province and was established on 29 December 1978, with 19 communes and 1 town. It was merged with Hồng Dân district on 17 May 1984. On 25 September 2000 the district was separated from Hồng Dân District. As of 2004 the district had a population of 106,000. The district covers 404.8 km^{2}. In 2009, bird flu killed 30 ducks in the district.

On June 16, 2025, the Standing Committee of the National Assembly issued Resolution No. 1685/NQ-UBTVQH15. The district was dissolved and new wards were rearranged from the district.

== Administrative divisions ==
The district is divided into one township, Phước Long, and the communes of Phong Thạnh Tây A, Phong Thạnh Tây B, Vĩnh Phú Đông, Vĩnh Phú Tây, Hưng Phú and Vĩnh Thanh.
