= Vĩnh Thịnh =

Vĩnh Thịnh may refer to:

== Places in Vietnam ==
- Vĩnh Thịnh, Bạc Liêu, a commune in Hòa Binh District, Bac Lieu Province
- Vĩnh Thịnh, a commune of Vĩnh Lộc District, Thanh Hóa Province
- Vĩnh Thịnh, a commune of Vĩnh Tường District, Vĩnh Phúc Province

== Other uses ==
- an era name of Emperor Lê Dụ Tông
