= Vĩnh Hậu =

Vĩnh Hậu may refer to several communes in Vietnam, including:

- Vĩnh Hậu, An Giang, a commune of An Phú District
- Vĩnh Hậu, Bạc Liêu, a commune of Hòa Bình District
- Vĩnh Hậu A, a commune of Hòa Bình District in Bạc Liêu Province
