= Vĩnh Lộc =

Vĩnh Lộc may refer to:

== Places in Vietnam ==
- Vĩnh Lộc district, a district in Thanh Hóa province
- Vĩnh Lộc, Cà Mau, a commune and village in Cà Mau province
- Vĩnh Lộc, Ho Chi Minh City
- Vĩnh Lộc, Tuyên Quang, district capital of Chiêm Hóa district

== People ==
- Vinh Loc (general), Nguyễn Phước Vĩnh Lộc (1923–2009), ARVN lieutenant general during the Vietnam War
