= Hòa Bình district =

Coordinates: 9°12′57″N 105°36′52″E

Hòa Bình district Huyện Hòa Bình
- District
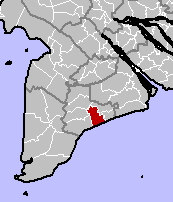
- Location in Bạc Liêu province
- Country: Vietnam
- Province: Bạc Liêu

Area
  - Total: 158.82 sq mi (411.33 km^{2})

Population (2004)
  - Total: 102,063
- Time zone: UTC+7 (Indochina Time)

Hòa Bình was a district of Bạc Liêu province (Now Cà Mau province) in the Mekong Delta region of Vietnam. It was established in 2007. The district's area was about 411.33 km^{2} and its population was about 102,063 people (2005).

On June 16, 2025, the Standing Committee of the National Assembly issued Resolution No. 1685/NQ-UBTVQH15. The district was dissolved and new wards were rearranged from the district.

== Administrative divisions ==
Hòa Bình includes a township and seven communes:

- Hòa Bình township
- Minh Diệu
- Vĩnh Bình
- Vĩnh Mỹ A
- Vĩnh Mỹ B
- Vĩnh Thịnh
- Vĩnh Hậu
- Vĩnh Hậu A
