= Phước Long, Cà Mau =

Phước Long Phường Phước Long
- Ward
- Location in Vietnam
- Coordinates: 9°25′18″N 105°27′32″E
- Country: Vietnam
- Province: Bạc Liêu
- District: Phước Long District
- Time zone: UTC+07:00 (Indochina Time)

Phước Long is a ward in Cà Mau Province in southern Vietnam.

The Standing Committee of the National Assembly issued Resolution No. 1655/NQ-UBTVQH15 on the rearrangement of commune-level administrative units of Cà Mau Province in 2025 (the resolution takes effect from 16 June 2025). Accordingly, Phước Long Commune was established in Cà Mau Province on the basis of the entire natural area of 49.48 km² and a population of 24,984 people of Phước Long Township, and the entire natural area of 48.63 km² and a population of 22,297 people of Vĩnh Phú Đông Commune, Phước Long District, Bạc Liêu Province.
