= Heping =

Heping (Chinese: 和平; lit. 'peace') may refer to:

- Heping, Taichung (和平區), a district in Taichung, Taiwan

== Places in Mainland China ==
- Heping District, Tianjin (和平区)
- Heping District, Shenyang (和平区), Liaoning
- Heping County (和平县), of Heyuan, Guangdong

=== Subdistricts ===
- Heping Subdistrict, Shaoguan, in Zhenjiang District, Shaoguan, Guangdong
- Heping Subdistrict, Gaobeidian, Hebei
- Heping Subdistrict, Handan, in Congtai District, Handan, Hebei
- Heping Subdistrict, Wuhan, in Hongshan District, Wuhan, Hubei
- Heping Subdistrict, Baotou, in Donghe District, Baotou, Inner Mongolia
- Heping Subdistrict, Ulan Hot, Inner Mongolia
- Heping Subdistrict, Xuzhou, in Quanshan District, Xuzhou, Jiangsu
- Heping Subdistrict, Meihekou, Jilin
- Heping Subdistrict, Anshan City, in Tiedong District, Anshan, Liaoning
- Heping Subdistrict, Fushun, in Wanghua District, Fushun, Liaoning
- Heping Subdistrict, Fuxin, in Haizhou District, Fuxin, Liaoning
- Heping Subdistrict, Zibo, in Zhangdian District, Zibo, Shandong
- Heping Subdistrict, Taiyuan, in Wanbailin District, Taiyuan, Shanxi
- Heping Subdistrict, Tacheng, Xinjiang
- Heping Subdistrict, Xiangtan, a subdistrict of Yuhu District, Xiangtan City, Hunan

=== Towns ===
- Heping, Shaowu, Fujian
- Heping, Zhangping, Fujian
- Heping, Wuwei, in Liangzhou District, Wuwei, Gansu
- Heping, Yuzhong County, Gansu
- Heping, Shantou, in Chaoyang District, Shantou, Guangdong
- Heping, Teng County, Guangxi
- Heping, Huishui County, Guizhou
- Heping, Yanhe County, in Yanhe Tujia Autonomous County, Guizhou
- Heping, Qiongzhong County, in Qiongzhong Li and Miao Autonomous County, Hainan
- Heping, Tailai County, Heilongjiang
- Heping, Wudalianchi, Heilongjiang
- Heping, Guiyang County, Hunan
- Heping, Huai'an, in Qingpu District, Huai'an, Jiangsu
- Heping, Fenxi County, Shanxi
- Heping, Changxing County, Zhejiang

=== Townships ===
- Heping Township, Yuexi County, Anhui
- Heping Township, Longxi County, Gansu
- Heping Township, Longsheng County, in Longsheng Various Nationalities Autonomous County, Guangxi
- Heping Township, Sanjiang County, in Sanjiang Dong Autonomous County, Guangxi
- Heping Township, Tongren City, Guizhou
- Heping Township, Zhaoyuan County, Heilongjiang
- Heping Township, Hengyang, in Zhuhui District, Hengyang, Hunan
- Heping Township, Faku County, Liaoning
- Heping Township, Huangyuan County, Qinghai
- Heping Township, Anyue County, Sichuan
- Heping Township, Nanjiang County, Sichuan
- Heping Township, Xinlong County, Sichuan
- Heping Township, Zigong, in Da'an District, Zigong, Sichuan
- Heping Township, Yunxiao County, Zhejiang

== Historical eras ==
- Heping (河平, 28BC–25BC), era name used by Emperor Cheng of Han
- Heping (和平, 150), era name used by Emperor Huan of Han
- Heping (和平, 354–355), era name used by Zhang Zuo, ruler of Former Liang
- Heping (和平, 460–465), era name used by Emperor Wencheng of Northern Wei

== See also ==
- He Ping (disambiguation)
- Hoa Binh (disambiguation), the Vietnamese cognate
- Hwapyong County, from the Korean cognate
