= He Ping =

He Ping may refer to:

- He Ping (general) (born 1957), Chinese general
- He Ping (director) (born 1957), Chinese director
- He Ping (journalist) (born 1957), Chinese journalist and politician
- Ho Ping (He Ping; born 1958), Taiwanese director
- Wang Ping (Three Kingdoms) (died 248), also known as He Ping

== See also ==
- Heping (disambiguation)
