= Vĩnh Mỹ, Cà Mau =

Vĩnh Mỹ
- Commune and village
- Location in Vietnam
- Coordinates: 9°17′22″N 105°33′40″E
- Country: Vietnam
- Province: Cà Mau Province
- Time zone: UTC+7 (UTC+7)

Vĩnh Mỹ is a commune (xã) and village in Cà Mau Province, in south-western Vietnam.

On 16 June 2025, the Standing Committee of the National Assembly issued Resolution No. 1655/NQ-UBTVQH15 on the rearrangement of commune-level administrative units of Cà Mau Province in 2025 (the resolution takes effect from 16 June 2025). Accordingly, Vĩnh Mỹ Commune was established in Cà Mau Province on the basis of the entire 40.72 km² of natural area and a population of 15,558 people of Minh Diệu Commune, the entire 38.73 km² of natural area and a population of 17,939 people of Vĩnh Bình Commune, and the entire 36.33 km² of natural area and a population of 18,790 people of Vĩnh Mỹ B Commune, all formerly belonging to Hòa Bình District, Bạc Liêu Province.
