= Hòa Bình, Ho Chi Minh City =

Hòa Bình Phường Hòa Bình
- Ward
- Interactive map of Hòa Bình
- Coordinates: 10°46′13″N 106°38′43″E
- Country: Vietnam
- Municipality: Ho Chi Minh City
- Established: June 16, 2025

Area
  - Total: 0.38 sq mi (0.98 km^{2})

Population (2024)
  - Total: 69,318
  - Density: 180,000/sq mi (71,000/km^{2})
- Time zone: UTC+07:00 (Indochina Time)
- Administrative code: 27211

Hòa Bình (Vietnamese: Phường Hòa Bình) is a ward of Ho Chi Minh City, Vietnam. It is one of the 168 new wards, communes and special zones of the city following the reorganization in 2025.

== History ==
On June 16, 2025, the National Assembly Standing Committee issued Resolution No. 1685/NQ-UBTVQH15 on the arrangement of commune-level administrative units of Ho Chi Minh City in 2025 (effective from June 16, 2025). Accordingly, the entire land area and population of Ward 5 and Ward 14 of the former District 11 will be integrated into a new ward named Hòa Bình (Clause 30, Article 1).
