= Ninh Thạnh Lợi =

- Commune and village
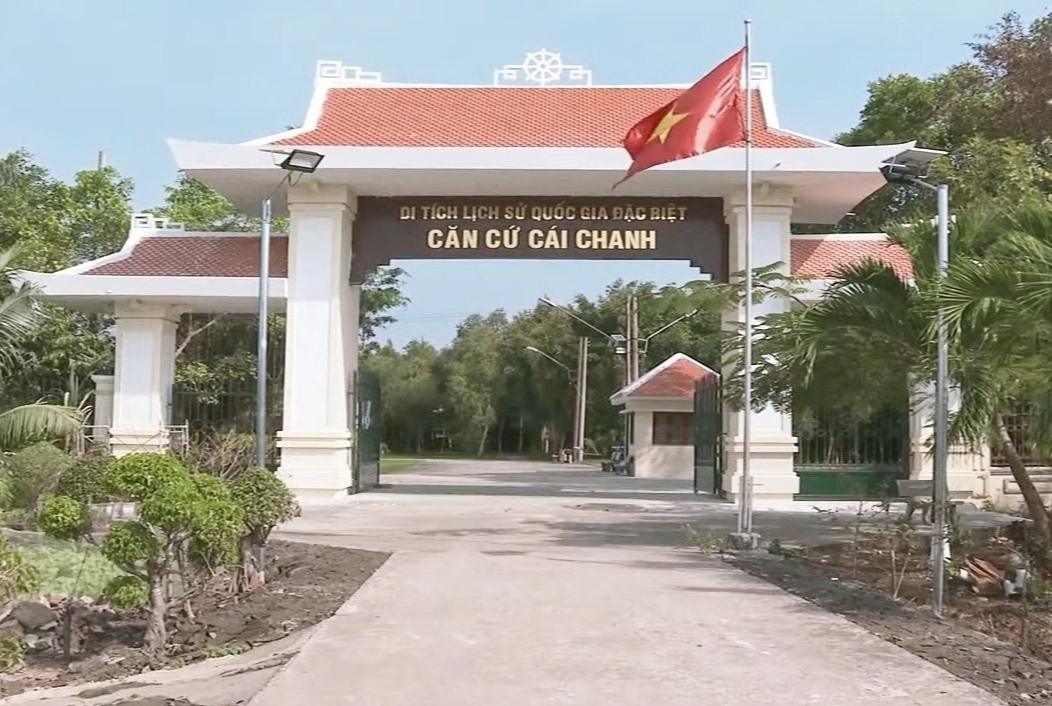

- Location in Vietnam
- Coordinates: 9°29′N 105°21′E
- Country: Vietnam
- Province: Cà Mau Province
- Time zone: UTC+7 (UTC+7)

Ninh Thạnh Lợi is a commune (xã) and village in Cà Mau Province, in south-western Vietnam.

The Standing Committee of the National Assembly issued Resolution No. 1655/NQ-UBTVQH15 on the rearrangement of commune-level administrative units of Cà Mau Province in 2025 (the resolution takes effect from 16 June 2025). Accordingly, Ninh Thạnh Lợi Commune was established in Cà Mau Province on the basis of the entire 66.40 km^{2} of natural area and a population of 14,437 people of Ninh Thạnh Lợi Commune, and the entire 66.87 km^{2} of natural area and a population of 10,354 people of Ninh Thạnh Lợi A Commune, both formerly belonging to Hồng Dân District, Bạc Liêu Province.
