= Ninh Quới =

- Commune and village
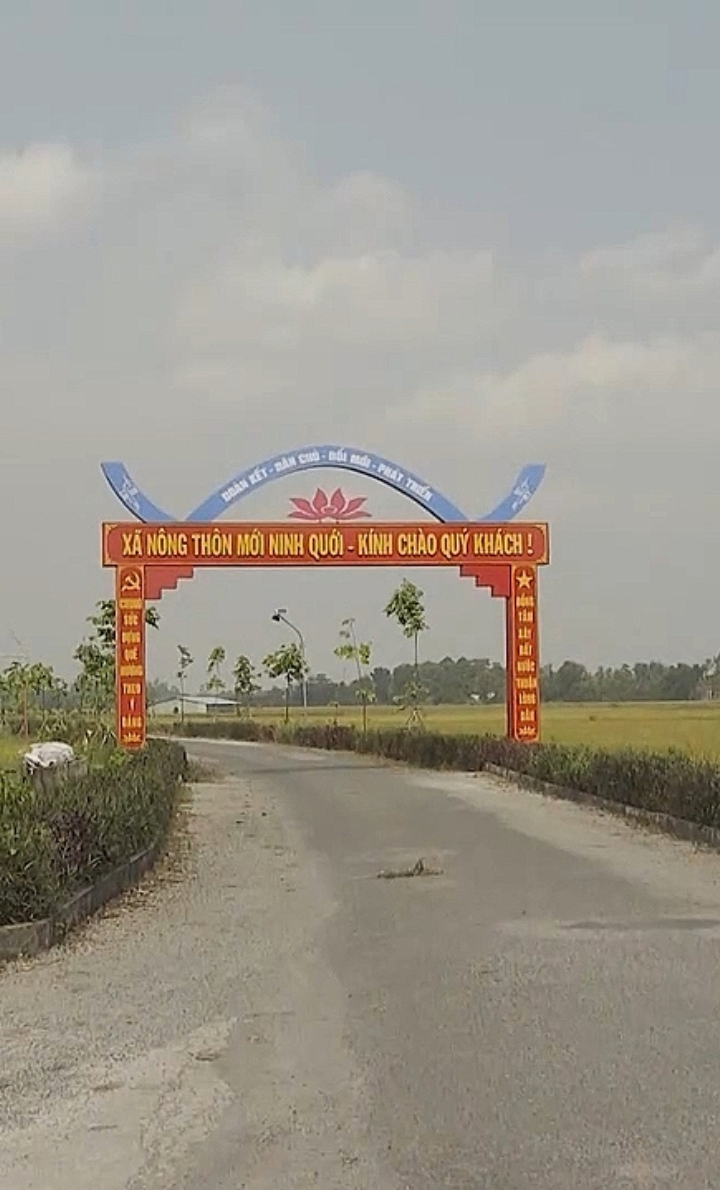
- Gate at the community's entrance

- Location in Vietnam
- Coordinates: 9.5586°N 105.5250°E
- Country: Vietnam
- Province: Cà Mau Province
- Time zone: UTC+7 (UTC+7)

Ninh Quới is a commune (xã) and village in Cà Mau Province, in south-western Vietnam.

The Standing Committee of the National Assembly issued Resolution No. 1655/NQ-UBTVQH15 on the rearrangement of commune-level administrative units of Cà Mau Province in 2025 (the resolution takes effect from 16 June 2025). Accordingly, Ninh Quới Commune was established in Cà Mau Province on the basis of the entire 32.42 km² of natural area and a population of 13,994 people of Ninh Quới Commune, and the entire 40.70 km² of natural area and a population of 18,667 people of Ninh Quới A Commune, both formerly belonging to Hồng Dân District, Bạc Liêu Province.
