= Láng Tròn =

Ward of Cà Mau Province

- Ward
- Location in Vietnam
- Coordinates: 9°16′18″N 105°30′39″E
- Country: Vietnam
- Province: Cà Mau Province

Government
  - Secretary of CPV: Bùi Thanh Toàn
  - Chairman of People's Council: Ngô Quốc Tuấn

Area
  - Total: 41.1 sq mi (106.5 km^{2})

Population
  - Total: 46,869
  - Density: 1,100/sq mi (440/km^{2})
- Time zone: UTC+7 (UTC+7)
- Area code: 31951
- Website: langtron.camau.gov.vn

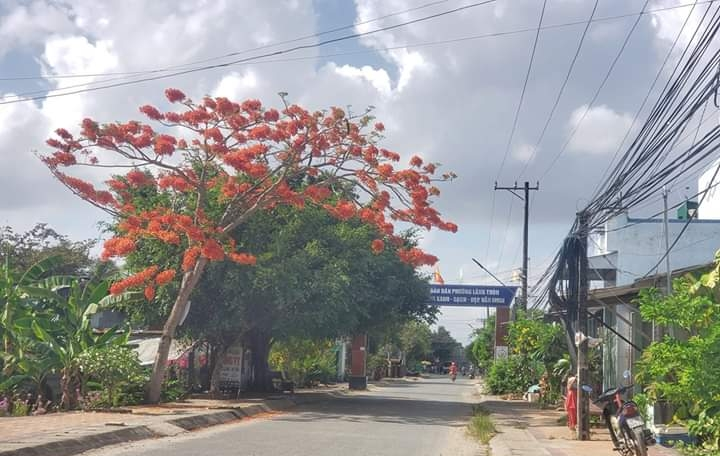
Láng Tròn Ward, Giá Rai Town, Bạc Liêu

Láng Tròn is a ward (phường) of Cà Mau Province in the Mekong Delta region of Vietnam.

The ward borders Giá Rai ward in the west, Vĩnh Phước in the northwest, Vĩnh Thanh in the northeast, Vĩnh Mỹ in the east, Đông Hải in the south and a small border in the southeast of Hòa Bình commune.

The ward is formerly the rural commune of Phong Thạnh Đông A.

== Administrative Divisions ==
Láng Tròn is divided into 23 residential divisions: 1, 2, 3, 5, 7, 8, 9, 10, 11, 12, 12A, 13, 13A, 14, 15, 15A, 16A, 16B, 17, 18, 19, 20, 21.

== History ==
Before 1979, Phong Thạnh Đông commune (now Láng Tròn) was a part of rural district of Giá Rai

On 4th April 1979, after the passing of Resolution No. 142-CP, divided Phong Thạnh Đông into 5 communes: Phong Nam, Phong Tân, Phong Phú, Phong Quý, Phong Thạnh Đông.

On 13th April 1991, following the Resolution No. 183/QĐ-TCCP integrated Phong Nam into Phong Tân and Phong Phú with Phong Quý into Phong Thạnh commune.

On 25th August 1999, Resolution No. 82/1999/NĐ-CP was passed establishing Phong Thạnh Đông A commune from a part of Phong Thạnh Đông.

On 15th May 2015, Standing Committee of the National Assembly issued Resolution No. 930/NQ-UBTVQH13 on establishing Giá Rai town and Láng Tròn ward as a part of the town.

As of 31/12/2024: Láng Tròn Ward has 7 residential divisions: 1, 2, 3, 7, 8, 12, 13. Phong Thạnh Đông commune has 6 hamlets: 9, 10, 11, 12, 13, 15. Phong Tấn commune has 10 hamlets: 5, 14, 15, 16A, 16B, 17, 18, 19, 20, 21.

The Standing Committee of the National Assembly issued Resolution No. 1655/NQ-UBTVQH15 on the rearrangement of commune-level administrative units of Cà Mau Province in 2025 (the resolution takes effect from 16 June 2025). Accordingly, Láng Tròn Ward was established in Cà Mau Province on the basis of the entire 53.85 km² of natural area and a population of 16,403 people of Phong Tân Commune, the entire 20.40 km² of natural area and a population of 8,588 people of Phong Thạnh Đông Commune, and the entire 32.18 km² of natural area and a population of 21,468 people of Láng Tròn Ward, all formerly belonging to Giá Rai Town, Bạc Liêu Province.
