= Giá Rai (town) =

Coordinates: 9.250°N 105.417°E

Giá Rai Town Thị xã Giá Rai
- District-level town (Class-4)
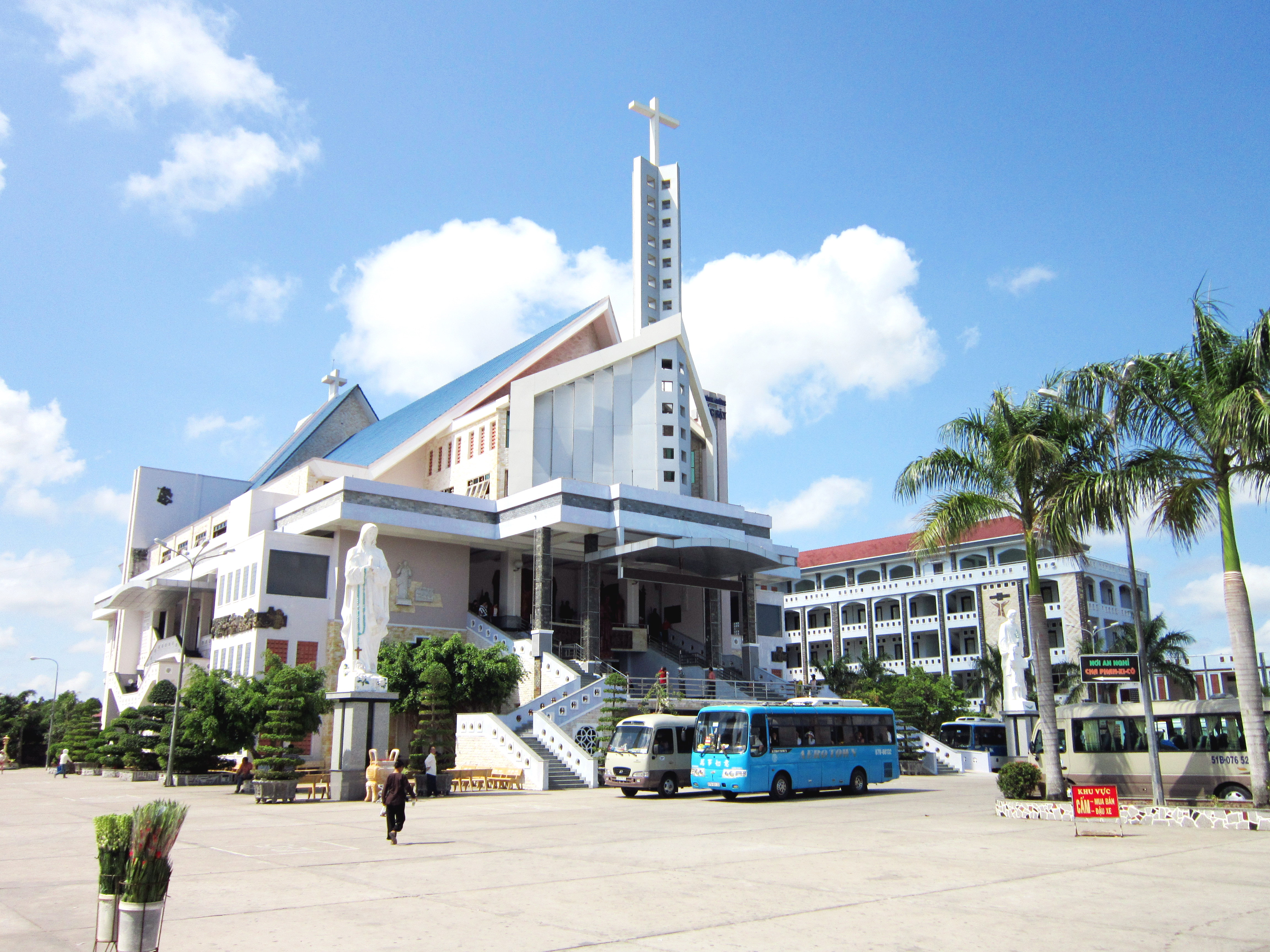
- Landscape of the Tắc Sậy Church (Note: Nguyễn Nghị, Catholic Churches in Vietnam, Architecture – history. Nhà thờ Công giáo ở Việt Nam, kiến trúc – lịch sử, Nhà xuất bản Tổng hợp TP. Hồ Chí Minh, 2004: "The church of Tắc Sậy, Нộ Phòng village, Giá Rai district. This church belongs to the Franciscan Pilgrimage center, measuring 20m by 8m".)
- Interactive map of Giá Rai Town; Thị xã Giá Rai
- Country: Vietnam
- Province: Bạc Liêu
- Establishment: October 5, 1917
- Central agency: No.1, Block 1, National Route 1, Ward 1, Giá Rai town

Government
  - Type: Town
  - People Committee's Chairman: Đỗ Minh Thắng
  - People Council's Chairman: Trần Thanh Danh
  - Front Committee's Chairman: Trần Văn Trạng
  - Party Committee's Secretary: Lê Minh Hải

Area
  - Total: 35,399 km^{2} (13,668 sq mi)

Population (August 20, 2024)
  - Total: 166,324
  - Density: 469/km^{2} (1,210/sq mi)
  - Ethnicities: Kinh (94%); Khmer (4%); Tanka (2%)
- Time zone: UTC+7 (Indochina Time)
- ZIP code: 97000-975
- Climate: Cwa
- Website: Giarai.Baclieu.gov.vn; Giarai.Baclieu.dcs.vn

Giá Rai [jaː˧˥:ɹaːj˧˧] is a former district-level town of Bạc Liêu province in the Mekong Delta region of Vietnam.

== History ==
=== Middle Ages ===
Before 1862–67, most of the territory of modern Bạc Liêu province was only the Eastern part of Long Xuyên rural district, An Biên prefecture, Hà Tiên garrison.

On June 15, 1867, as soon as Cochinchina became a complete colony of the French Republic, the regime of rural district (huyện) and prefecture (phủ) was replaced by the inspection, which was equivalent to the shire of the United Kingdom. Because of that, Hà Tiên province was changed as Kiên Giang inspection (Kiên Giang thanh tra hạt). However, on August 16, Kiên Giang i. was continued to change as Rạch Giá inspection (Rạch Giá thanh tra hạt).

In 1876, Rạch Giá i. was changed as Rạch Giá arrondissement (Rạch Giá tham biện hạt). However, by 1882, the Government of French Cochinchina has separated the East to Bạc Liêu arrondissement (Bạc Liêu tham biện hạt).

On December 20, 1899, Governor-General Paul Doumer issued a decree that, from January 1, 1900, all province-level administrative units in French Indochina agreed to be called "tỉnh" (province), including Bạc Liêu.

=== 20th century ===
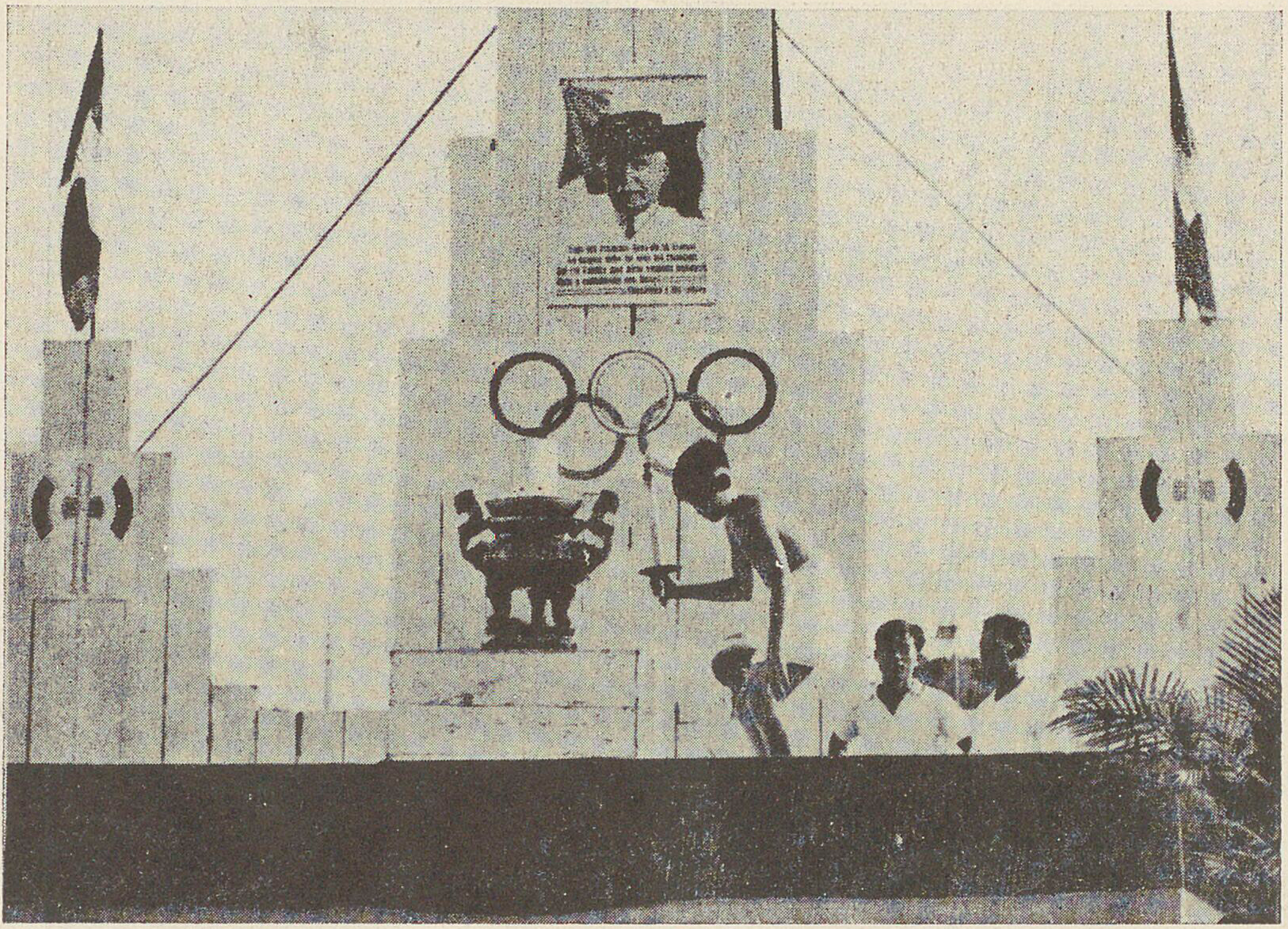
The torch to open the Indochina Youth Sports Festival, Phong Thạnh village (now Giá Rai town) on December 27, 1941

Initially, Bạc Liêu province only consisted of two districts, Vĩnh Lợi and Cà Mâu. (Note: Mâu, not Mau.) However, on October 5, 1917, the Government of French Cochinchina decided to establish Giá Rai district (quận Giá Rai) based on some parts of Vĩnh Lợi and Cà Mâu. "Giá Rai" (海漆, "milky mangrove") comes from the name of Rạch Giá (海漆溪, "creek of milky mangrove") before. From then until before the World War II, the area of the district was constantly expanded.

Since April 5, 1944, the district government was officially located at Phong Thạnh village (làng Phong Thạnh).

After the August Revolution in 1945, the Southern Resistance Administration Committee (Note: Ủy-ban Hành-chánh Kháng-chiến Nam-bộ.) changed Giá Rai d. to Giá Rai rural district (huyện Giá Rai). However, the Government of the Autonomous Republic of Cochinchina have restored the old name. That has been kept by the successive governments State of Vietnam and Republic of Vietnam.

Since October 22, 1956, Giá Rai has belonged to Ba Xuyên province, which was based on the merger of two provinces Bạc Liêu and Sóc Trăng.

On September 8, 1964, Prime Minister Nguyễn Khánh has signed Decree 254-NV that, Bạc Liêu province was re-established since October 1. Therefore, from then to May 1, 1975, Giá Rai district was part of Bạc Liêu province.

After the whole South of the DMZ under the management of the Government of the Republic of South Vietnam, Giá Rai d. has been changed to Giá Rai rural district.

Since February 1976, when Vietnam reunited with legal, Giá Rai belonged to Minh Hải province, which was based on the merger of two provinces Bạc Liêu and Cà Mau. (Note: Mau, not Mâu.)

On July 11, 1977, the Council of Ministers issued Decision 181-CP on the merger of three communes and one township of dissolved Châu Thành rural district into Giá Rai.

By December 29, 1978, the Council of Ministers continued to issue Decision 326-CP on splitting Giá Rai into two new rural districts Giá Rai (East) and Cà Mau (West).

On April 4, 1979, Giá Rai capital-township (thị trấn Giá Rai) was established under Decision 142-CP of the Council of Ministers, where was based on the merger of two communes Phong Thạnh and Long Điền.

By August 30, 1983, the Council of Ministers issued Decision 94-HĐBT on the merger of three communes of dissolved Cà Mau rural district into Giá Rai.

On November 6, 1996, Chairman of the National Assembly Nông Đức Mạnh signed the promulgation of the Resolution on the division of Minh Hải into two new provinces Bạc Liêu and Cà Mau. Since then, Giá Rai belongs to Bạc Liêu province.

=== 21st century ===
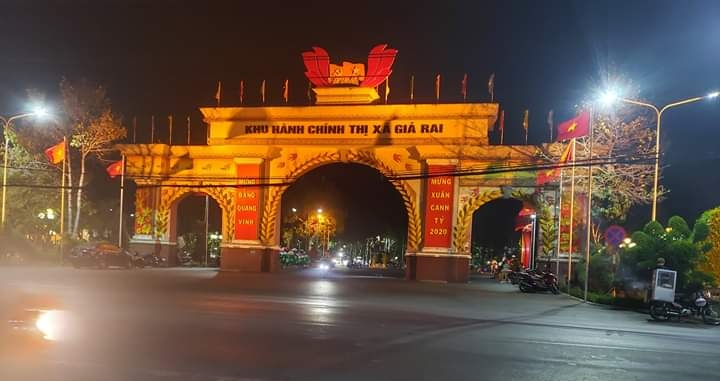
Giá Rai on a spring night of 2020

On December 24, 2001, the Government of Vietnam issued Decree 98/2001/NĐ-CP on separating Giá Rai into two new rural districts Giá Rai (North) and Đông Hải (South).

On July 31, 2013, the Ministry of Construction issued Decision 717/QĐ-BXD on the recognition of Hộ Phòng township (thị trấn Hộ Phòng) as the municipality of class-IV. Based on that fact, on May 15, 2015, the National Assembly Standing Committee issued Resolution 930/NQ-UBTVQH13 on the merger of two townships Giá Rai–Hộ Phòng and Phong Thạnh Đông A commune to Giá Rai town (thị xã Giá Rai). This was invisible to the fact that, the entire natural area and population of the rural district has become a town. However, it still includes two specific administrative units, which are wards (urban) and communes (rural areas).

== Geography ==
=== Topography ===
Currently, Giá Rai rural district is divided into 10 commune-level administrative units.

- 3 wards (with 17 resident groups): 1st, Láng Tròn and Hộ Phòng
- 7 commune (with 52 hamlets): Phong Tân, Phong Thạnh, Phong Thạnh A, Phong Thạnh Đông, Phong Thạnh Tây, Tân Phong, Tân Thạnh

The rural district covers an area of 353,99 km^{2}, meaning equivalent to half of Singapore area. Its terrain is relatively low compared to sea levels and has absolutely no mountains, so it is always difficult in every rainy season.

=== Population ===
As of 2024, the town had a population of 125,690.

== See also ==
- Đầm Dơi district
- Đông Hải district
- Hòa Bình district
