= Hồng Dân, Cà Mau =

Hồng Dân
- Ward
- Location in Vietnam
- Coordinates: 9°31′58″N 105°28′10″E
- Country: Vietnam
- Province: Cà Mau
- Time zone: UTC+07:00 (Indochina Time)

Hồng Dân is a ward (phường) of Cà Mau Province, in south-western Vietnam.

The Standing Committee of the National Assembly issued Resolution No. 1655/NQ-UBTVQH15 on the rearrangement of commune-level administrative units of Cà Mau Province in 2025 (the resolution takes effect from June 16, 2025). Accordingly, Hồng Dân Commune was established in Cà Mau Province on the basis of the entire 15.62 km² of natural area and a population of 13,838 people of Ngan Dừa Township, the entire 50.29 km² of natural area and a population of 13,234 people of Lộc Ninh Commune, and the entire 59.01 km² of natural area and a population of 23,122 people of Ninh Hòa Commune, formerly belonging to Hồng Dân District, Bạc Liêu Province.

== History of Ngan Dừa ==
The town was founded before 1940, then burned down in the battle for independence from the French colonial forces. People left until 1955 when a new village was built. Ngan Dừa was the heart of the community and became the center of distribution and business for the others villages.

After re-establishing Ngan Dừa, schools were built and opened for students from elementary to middle school. High school students were admitted in September 1964.

Ngan Dừa has been part of Hồng Dân District since 25 September 2000.
