= Vĩnh Lộc, Cà Mau =

Vĩnh Lộc
- Commune and village
- Location in Vietnam
- Coordinates: 9.5778°N 105.3547°E
- Country: Vietnam
- Province: Cà Mau Province
- Time zone: UTC+7 (UTC+7)

Vĩnh Lộc is a commune (xã) and village in Cà Mau Province, in south-western Vietnam.

The Standing Committee of the National Assembly issued Resolution No. 1655/NQ-UBTVQH15 on the rearrangement of commune-level administrative units of Cà Mau Province in 2025 (the resolution takes effect from 16 June 2025). Accordingly, Vĩnh Lộc Commune was established in Cà Mau Province on the basis of the entire natural area of 48.47 km² and a population of 12,047 people of Vĩnh Lộc Commune, and the entire natural area of 44.01 km² and a population of 11,962 people of Vĩnh Lộc A Commune, Hồng Dân District, Bạc Liêu Province.
