= Đông Hải district =

Đông Hải district Huyện Đông Hải
- District
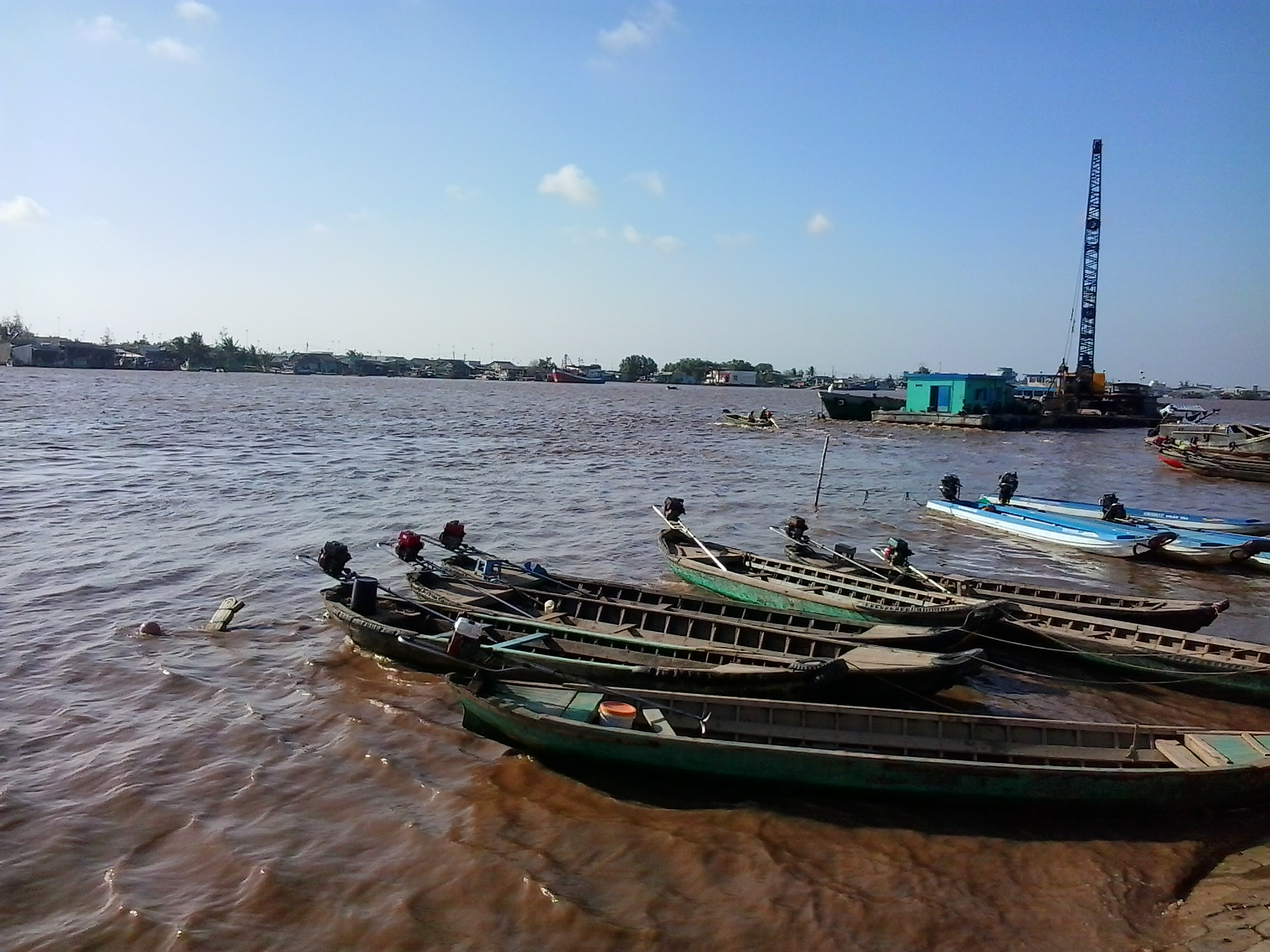
- Ganh Hao River, the natural boundary between Bac Lieu province and Ca Mau province

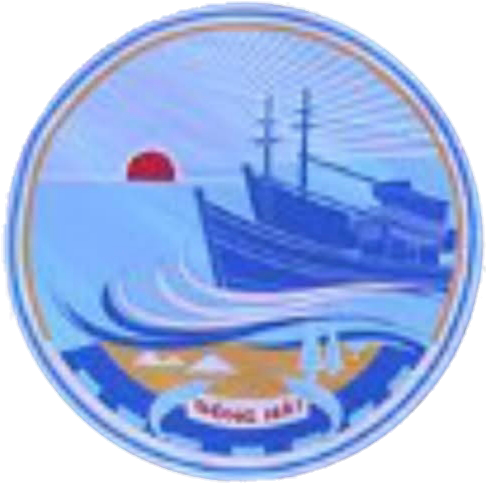
- Seal

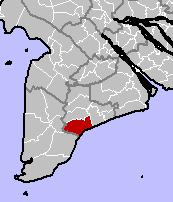
- Location in Bạc Liêu province
- Country: Vietnam
- Province: Bạc Liêu
- Capital: Gành Hào

Area
  - Total: 210 sq mi (550 km^{2})

Population (2003)
  - Total: 130,557
- Time zone: UTC+7 (Indochina Time)

Đông Hải was a rural district (huyện) of Bạc Liêu province (Now Cà Mau province) in the Mekong Delta region of Vietnam. As of 2003 the district had a population of 130,557. The district covered an area of 550 km^{2}. The district capital lies at Gành Hào.
