= Phong Hiệp =

Coordinates: 9°20′13″N 105°19′22″E

- Rural commune and village
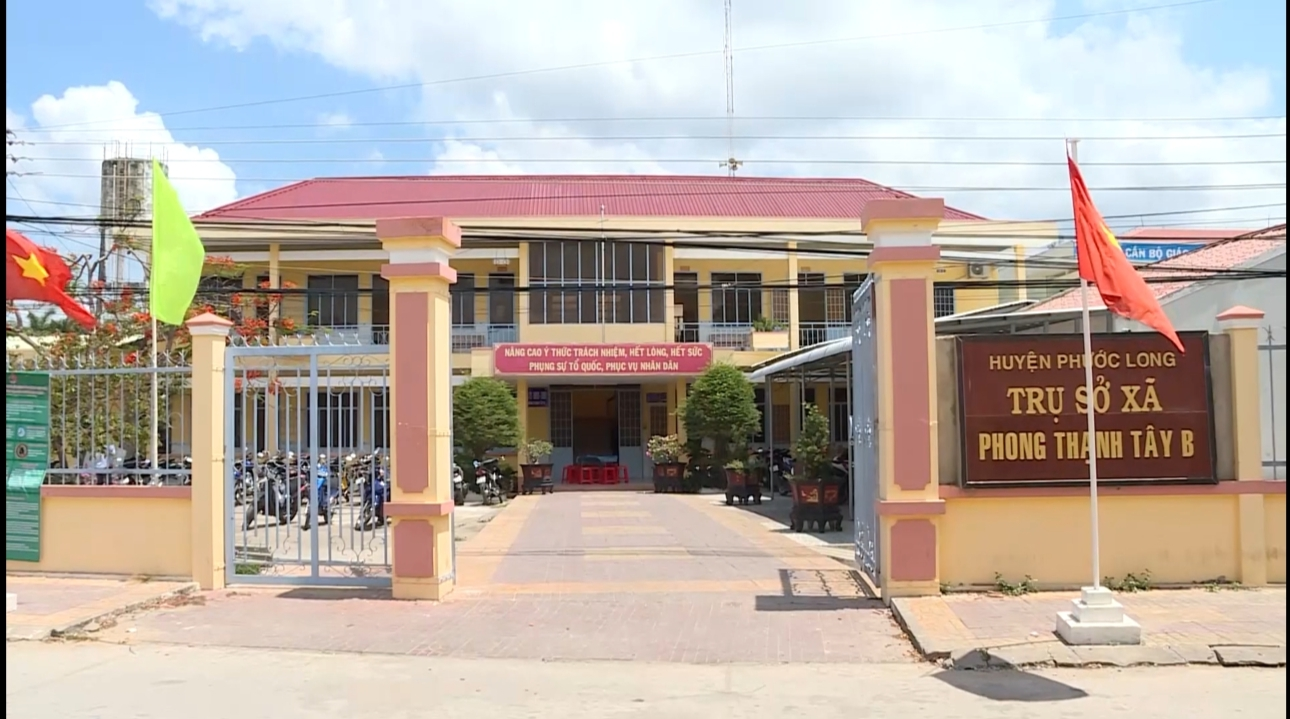
- Phong Thạnh
- Interactive map of Phong Hiệp
- Country: Vietnam
- Province: Cà Mau
- Time zone: UTC+07:00 (Indochina Time)

Phong Hiệp is a rural commune (xã) and village in Cà Mau Province, in south-western Vietnam.

The Standing Committee of the National Assembly issued Resolution No. 1655/NQ-UBTVQH15 on the rearrangement of commune-level administrative units of Cà Mau Province in 2025 (the resolution takes effect from 16 June 2025). Accordingly, Phong Hiệp Commune was established in Cà Mau Province on the basis of the entire 55.97 km² of natural area and a population of 13,523 people of Phong Thạnh Tây A Commune, and the entire 61.31 km² of natural area and a population of 15,187 people of Phong Thạnh Tây B Commune, both formerly belonging to Phước Long District, Bạc Liêu Province.
