= Long Điền, Cà Mau =

Long Điền Xã Long Điền
- Rural commune
- Location in Vietnam
- Country: Vietnam
- Province: Cà Mau
- Time zone: UTC+07:00 (Indochina Time)

Long Điền is a rural commune (xã) of Cà Mau Province in the Mekong Delta region of Vietnam.

The Standing Committee of the National Assembly issued Resolution No. 1655/NQ-UBTVQH15 on the rearrangement of commune-level administrative units of Cà Mau Province in 2025 (the resolution takes effect from 16 June 2025). Accordingly, Long Điền Commune was established in Cà Mau Province on the basis of the entire natural area of 41.82 km² and a population of 11,468 people of Điền Hải Commune, and the entire natural area of 87.72 km² and a population of 29,479 people of Long Điền Commune, both formerly belonging to Đông Hải District, Bạc Liêu Province.
