= Hòa Bình, Cà Mau =

Hòa Bình
- Ward
- Location in Vietnam
- Coordinates: 9°17′6″N 105°39′12″E
- Country: Vietnam
- Province: Cà Mau
- Time zone: UTC+07:00 (Indochina Time)

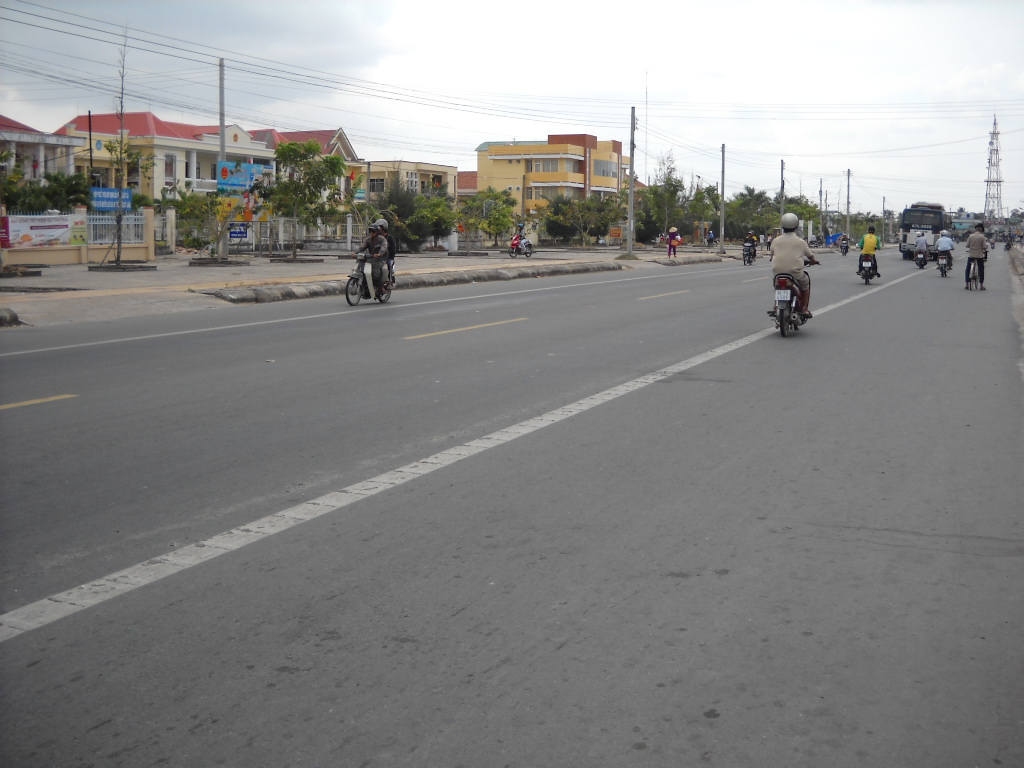
Hoa Binh town, Bac Lieu

Hòa Bình is a ward (phường) of Cà Mau Province, in south-western Vietnam.

The Standing Committee of the National Assembly issued Resolution No. 1655/NQ-UBTVQH15 on the rearrangement of commune-level administrative units of Cà Mau Province in 2025 (the resolution takes effect from 16 June 2025). Accordingly, Hòa Bình Commune was established in Cà Mau Province on the basis of the entire natural area of 26.54 km² and a population of 25,794 people of Hòa Bình Township; the entire natural area of 51.62 km² and a population of 20,397 people of Vĩnh Mỹ A Commune, Hòa Bình District; and the entire natural area of 36.61 km² and a population of 19,784 people of Long Thạnh Commune, Vĩnh Lợi District, Bạc Liêu Province.
