= Vĩnh Hậu, Cà Mau =

Vĩnh Hậu
- Commune and village
- Location in Vietnam
- Coordinates: 9°13′25″N 105°40′42″E
- Country: Vietnam
- Province: Cà Mau Province
- Time zone: UTC+7 (UTC+7)

Vĩnh Hậu is a commune (xã) and village in Cà Mau Province, in south-western Vietnam.

The Standing Committee of the National Assembly issued Resolution No. 1655/NQ-UBTVQH15 on the rearrangement of commune-level administrative units of Cà Mau Province in 2025 (the resolution takes effect from 16 June 2025). Accordingly, Vĩnh Hậu Commune was established in Cà Mau Province on the basis of the entire natural area of 62.56 km² and a population of 14,099 people of Vĩnh Hậu Commune; the entire natural area of 64.25 km² and a population of 9,852 people of Vĩnh Hậu A Commune; and the entire natural area of 105.94 km² and a population of 17,948 people of Vĩnh Thịnh Commune, Hòa Bình District, Bạc Liêu Province.
