= Bạc Liêu province =

Former province of Vietnam

Bạc Liêu
- Province
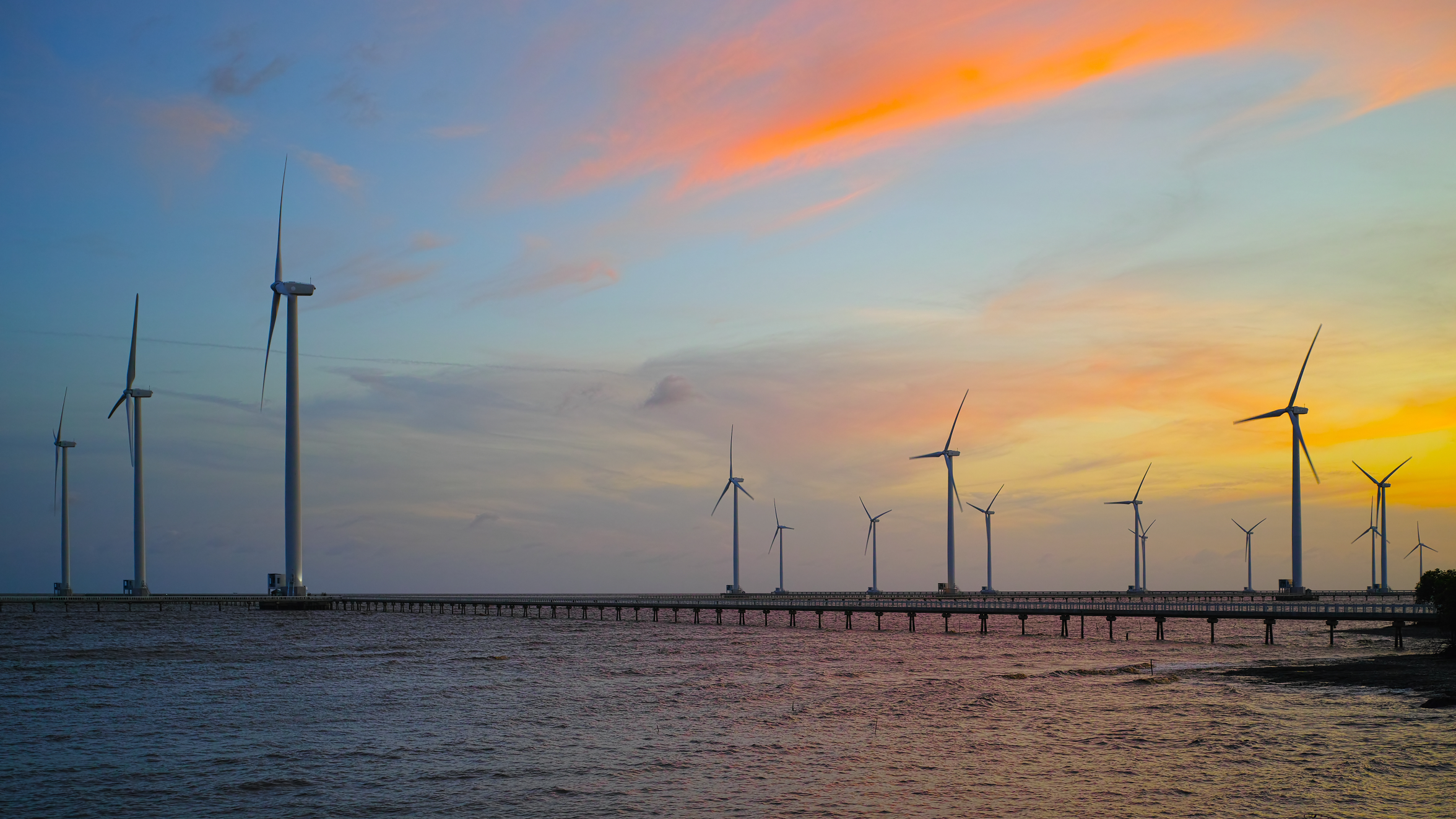
- Bạc Liêu windpower farm

- Seal

- Location of Bạc Liêu within Vietnam
- Coordinates: 9°15′N 105°45′E
- Country: Vietnam
- Region: Mekong Delta
- Capital: Bạc Liêu

Government
  - People's Council Chair: Lữ Văn Hùng
  - People's Committee Chair: Phạm Văn Thiều

Area
  - Total: 2,667.88 km^{2} (1,030.07 sq mi)

Population (2025)
  - Total: 1,166,503
  - Density: 437.240/km^{2} (1,132.45/sq mi)

Demographics
  - Ethnicities: Vietnamese, Khmer, Hoa

GDP
  - Total: VND 37.719 trillion US$ 1.638 billion
- Time zone: UTC+7 (ICT)
- Area codes: 291
- ISO 3166 code: VN-55
- HDI (2020): ▲0.670 (53rd)
- Website: www.baclieu.gov.vn

Bạc Liêu was a former province of Vietnam. It is a coastal province, and is situated in the Mekong Delta region of the southern part of the country.

On June 12, 2025, Bạc Liêu was incorporated into Cà Mau province.

== Administrative divisions ==
Bạc Liêu is subdivided into seven district-level sub-divisions:

- 5 districts:

- Đông Hải
- Hòa Bình
- Hồng Dân
- Phước Long
- Vĩnh Lợi

- 1 district-level town:

- Giá Rai

- 1 provincial city:
  - Bạc Liêu (capital)

They are further subdivided into seven commune-level towns (or townlets), 50 communes, and seven wards.

== Geography ==
Bạc Liêu is located on Mekong Delta, although it is actually located slightly to the south of the Mekong's main outflows. Bạc Liêu is around 100 kilometres (62 mi) south of Cần Thơ, the largest city in the Mekong Delta.

== Economy ==
The most important parts of Bạc Liêu's economy are rice farming, fishing, food processing, and clothing manufacturing.

== History ==
Bạc Liêu Province was established on December 20, 1899, and officially became an administrative unit on January 1, 1900. On October 22, 1956, Bạc Liêu Province was dissolved and merged into Ba Xuyen Province. On September 8, 1964, Bạc Liêu Province was re-established.

After the Fall of Saigon, 30 April 1975, Bạc Liêu province and Cà Mau province were merged into one new entity called Minh Hải province. In 1996, Minh Hải province was split into two, with the northeast becoming Bạc Liêu province and the southwest becoming Cà Mau province. Bac Lieu is renowned for its community of Teochew Chinese.

On 12 June 2025, as part of major nationwide reforms, Bạc Liêu province was dissolved and merged with Cà Mau province.

== Culture ==
Vọng cổ, an important song in the traditional music of southern Vietnam, was composed in Bạc Liêu around 1918 or 1919.

Referring to Bac Lieu, many people immediately think of the homeland of Prince Bac Lieu (Công Tử Bạc Liêu) Trần Trinh Huy also called Ba Huy, or the Black Prince – was a famous player not only in Bac Lieu but even in Saigon and the South of Vietnam during the 1930s and 1940s.
