= The Amazing Race Vietnam 2013 =

Season of television series

- Season 2013
- Presented by: Huy Khánh
- No. of teams: 9
- Winners: Thu Hiền & Diệp Lâm Anh
- No. of legs: 12
- No. of episodes: 12

Release
- Original network: VTV3
- Original release: 26 July – 18 October 2013

Additional information
- Filming dates: June 2013

Series chronology
- ← Previous; Season 1 Next → Season 3

The Amazing Race Vietnam: Cuộc đua kỳ thú 2013 is the second season of The Amazing Race Vietnam, a Vietnamese reality competition show based on the American series The Amazing Race. It featured nine teams of two in a race around Vietnam for 300 million₫.

The program premiered on VTV3 and aired every Friday primetime (8:00 p.m. UTC+7) from 26 July to 18 October 2013.

The host for the second season is Huy Khánh, replacing Dustin Nguyen who directed and hosted the first season.

Model and singer Thu Hiền and Diệp Lâm Anh were the winners of this season.

== Production ==
=== Development and filming ===
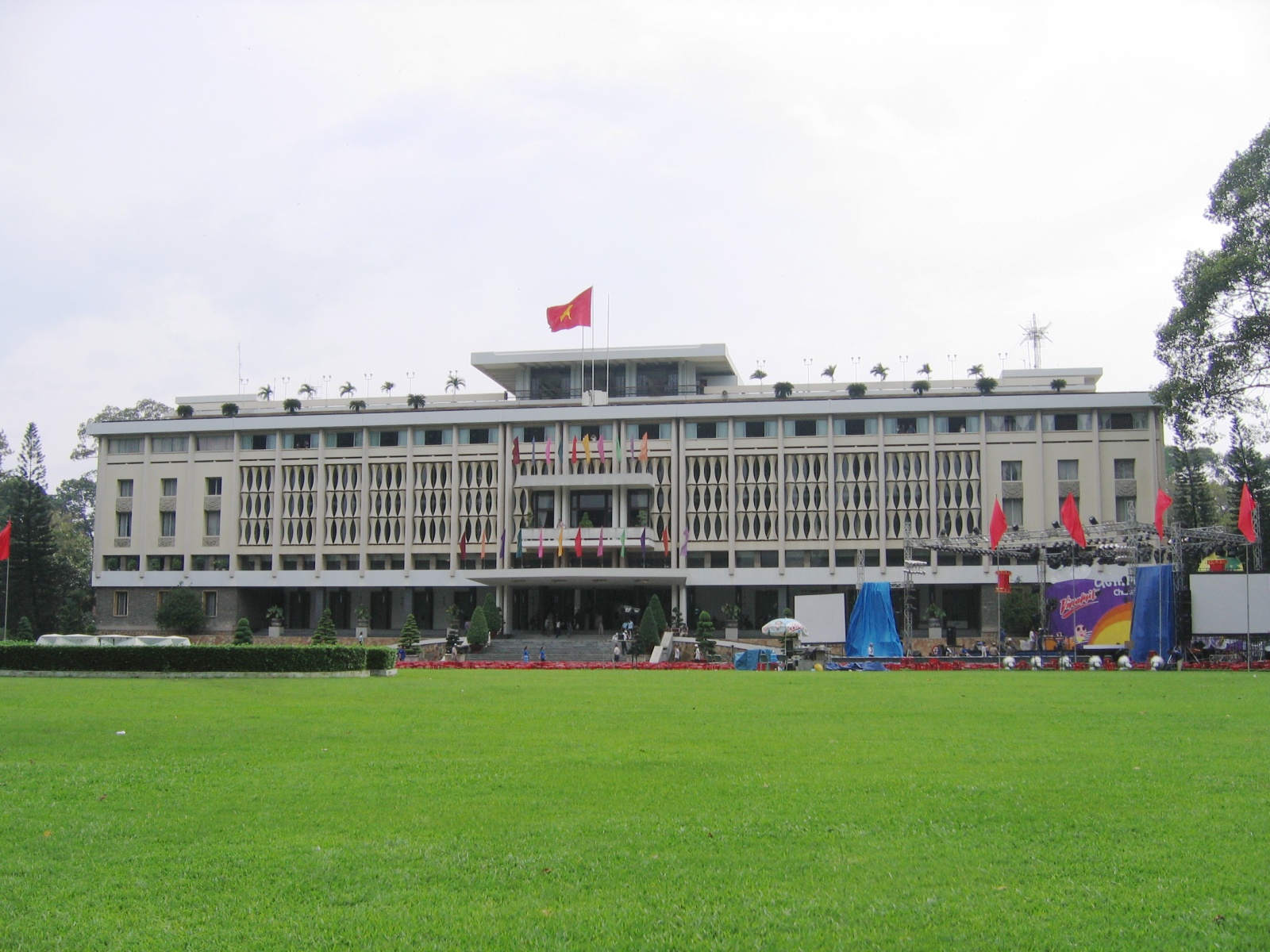
The Reunification Palace in Ho Chi Minh City was the Starting Line of the second season of The Amazing Race Vietnam.

Filming for this show began in June 2013.

This season was also the first time the show had teams travelling outside Vietnam.

=== Marketing ===
The show was sponsored by Sting Energy Drink and Singapore Airlines.

== Cast ==
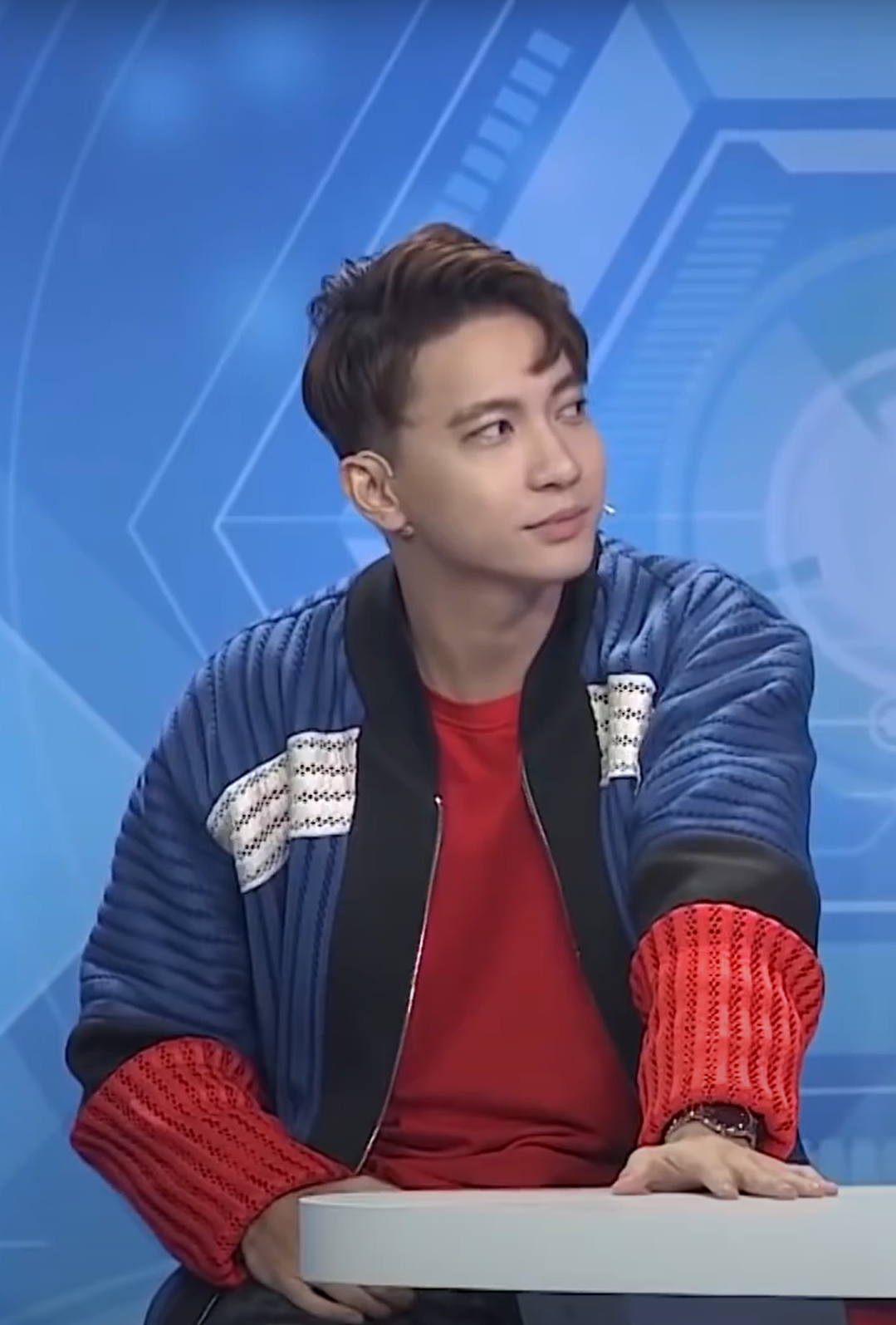
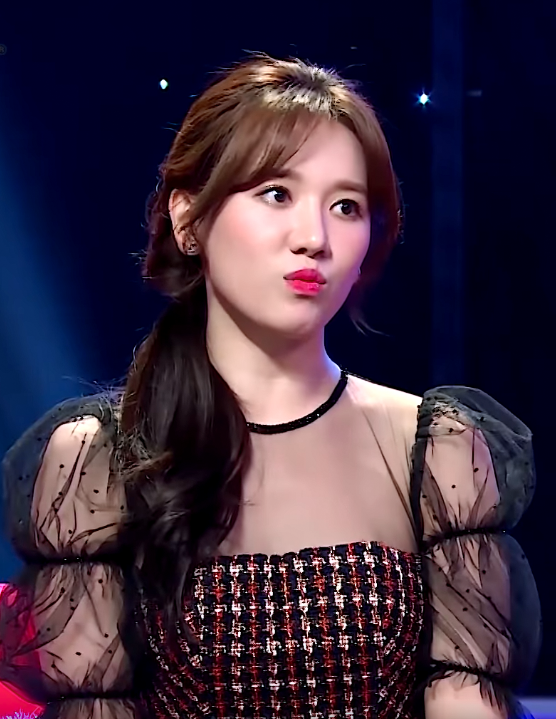
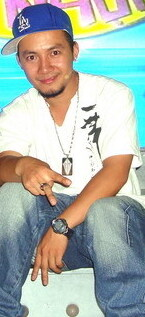
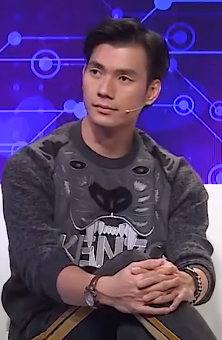
From left to right: S.T Sơn Thạch, Hari Won, Tiến Đạt and Nhan Phúc Vinh

This season was a celebrity edition featuring many celebrities who were chosen to race on the show. The cast was announced on 6 June.

After being eliminated, Tiến Đạt proposed to Hari and she accepted. The two separated in November 2015.

Contestants	Age	Profession	Hometown	Status
S.T Nguyễn Cao	22	Singer	Ho Chi Minh City	Eliminated 1st (in Đất Mũi, Cà Mau)
Lâm Hùng Phong	22	Stuntman	Ho Chi Minh City	Eliminated 1st (in Đất Mũi, Cà Mau)
Kim Lee	25	DJ	Los Angeles	Eliminated 2nd (in Phan Thiết, Bình Thuận)
Duy "Pharreal" Phương Nguyễn	24	DJ	Haiphong	Eliminated 2nd (in Phan Thiết, Bình Thuận)
Pha Lê Nguyễn	26	Singer	Haiphong	Eliminated 3rd (in Srepok River, Đắk Nông)
Hà Việt Dũng	26	Actor	Mãn Đức, Hòa Bình	Eliminated 3rd (in Srepok River, Đắk Nông)
Anh Tuấn Phạm	29	Model	Haiphong	Eliminated 4th (in Da Nang)
Thanh Hóa Đỗ Thị	23	Model	Hanoi	Eliminated 4th (in Da Nang)
Tiến Mạnh Đoàn	26	Real Estate Broker	Hà Giang, Hà Giang	Eliminated 5th (in Phong Nha-Kẻ Bàng National Park, Quảng Bình)
Linh Sơn Nguyễn	26	Actor	Hà Nam	Eliminated 5th (in Phong Nha-Kẻ Bàng National Park, Quảng Bình)
Esther "Hari" Lưu	28	Student	Seoul, South Korea	Eliminated 6th (in Sa Pa, Lào Cai)
Tiến Đạt Đinh	32	Rapper	Ho Chi Minh City	Eliminated 6th (in Sa Pa, Lào Cai)
Đức Hưng Dương	29	Office Worker	Hanoi	Third Place
Thùy Dung Nguyễn	26	Tennis Player	Hanoi	Third Place
Linh Chi Nguyễn Thị	31	Office Worker	Đà Lạt, Lâm Đồng	Second Place
Nhan Phúc Vinh	27	Actor	Cần Thơ	Second Place
Diệp "Lâm" Anh Nguyễn	24	Singer	Hanoi	Winners
Thu Hiền Trần Thị	24	Model	Vĩnh Phúc	Winners

=== Future appearances ===
Pha Lê Nguyễn and Hà Việt Dũng, Anh Tuấn Phạm and Thanh Hoa Đỗ Thị, and Nhan Phúc Vinh and Thùy Dung Nguyễn, as well as Thu Hiền Trần Thị and Tiến Đạt Đinh (who competed as separate composite teams), later returned to compete on the fifth season in 2016. S.T Sơn Thạch also returned to compete on the sixth season in 2019.

== Results ==
The following teams participated in the season, with their relationships at the time of filming. Note that this table is not necessarily reflective of all content broadcast on television due to inclusion or exclusion of some data.

Team	Position (by leg)												Roadblocks performed
Team	1	2	3	4	5	6	7	8	9	10	11	12	Roadblocks performed
Lâm Anh & Thu Hiền	6th^{2}	3rd	1st	6th	2nd	3rd	2nd	1st	1st	2nd	2nd^{10}	1st	Lâm Anh 7, Thu Hiền 6
Linh Chi & Phúc Vinh	1st	2nd	2nd	1st	4th	1st	4th^{7}	3rd	4th	1stƒ	1stε^{9}	2nd^{11}	Linh Chi 5, Phúc Vinh 7^{9}
Đức Hưng & Thùy Dung	7th	7th^{3}	5th	3rd	1st	5th^{6}	3rd	4th⊂	3rd	3rd	3rd	3rd^{12}	Đức Hưng 7^{12}, Thùy Dung 7
Hari & Tiến Đạt	4th	1st	3rd	2nd	3rd	2nd	1st	2nd⊃	2nd	4th	4th^{10}		Hari 5, Tiến Đạt 7
Đoàn Mạnh & Linh Sơn	3rd^{1}	4th	7th	5th	6th	4th	5th^{8}	5th					Đoàn Mạnh 4, Linh Sơn 4
Anh Tuấn & Thanh Hoa	5th	8th	4th	4th	5th	6th							Anh Tuấn 5, Thanh Hóa 1
Pha Lê & Việt Dũng	8th	6th	6th	7th	7th^{5}								Pha Lê 2, Việt Dũng 3
Kim & Pharreal	2nd	5th	8th										Kim 1, Pharreal 2
S.T & Hùng Phong	9th	9th^{4}											S.T 2, Hùng Phong 0

Key

- A red team placement means the team was eliminated.
- A purple ε indicates that the team decided to use the Express Pass on that leg.
- A green ƒ indicates that the team won a Fast Forward.
- A blue team's placement indicates that the team came in last on a non-elimination leg.
  - An underlined blue team's placement indicates that the team came in last on a non-elimination leg and was "Marked for Elimination"; if the team did not finish 1st on the next leg, they would receive a 30-minute penalty.
  - An italicized blue team placement indicates that the team was the last to arrive at a pit stop in a non-elimination leg. The teams were forced to relinquish all of their money. In addition, they were not allotted money for the next leg and were not allowed to collect money until the next leg started for them.
  - A bold blue team placement indicates that the team would have to wait an extra 30 minutes before departing on the next leg.
- An underlined leg number indicates that there was no mandatory rest period at the Pit Stop and all teams were ordered to continue racing. An underlined team placement indicates that the team came in last and was ordered to continue racing.
- A brown ⊃ indicates that the team chose to use the U-Turn; ⊂ indicates the team who received it.

Notes

1. Đoàn Mạnh & Linh Sơn initially arrived 3rd, but were issued a five-minute penalty for not getting the clue from BHD Cinema. This did not affect their placement.
2. Diệp Lâm Anh & Thu Hiền initially arrived 4th, but were issued a 15-minute penalty for trading bowls of beef noodles at Food Creative. Hari & Tiến Đạt and Anh Tuấn & Thanh Hoa checked-in during the penalty time, dropping Diệp Lâm Anh & Thu Hiền to 6th.
3. Thùy Dung & Đức Hưng initially arrived 7th, but were issued a 15-minute penalty for tracing a number of beans on the dirt. This did not affect their placement.
4. S.T & Lâm Hùng Phong initially arrived 8th, but were issued a 30-minute penalty for being "marked for elimination" and not arriving first. Anh Tuấn & Thanh Hoa checked in during their penalty time, dropping S.T and Lâm Hùng Phong to last place and resulting in their elimination.
5. Pha Lê was unable to complete the Roadblock on Leg 5, and she & Hà Việt Dũng were issued a four-hour penalty at the Roadblock site. Long after every other team had checked-in at the Pit Stop, Huy came to the Roadblock location to inform them of their elimination, without the four-hour penalty issued.
6. Đức Hưng & Thùy Dung initially arrived 2nd, but were issued a 15-minute penalty for receiving help from local people to complete the additional task. Three teams checked in during the penalty time, dropping Đức Hưng and Thùy Dung to fifth.
7. Linh Chi & Nhan Phúc Vinh initially arrived 2nd, but had lost their Roadblock clue. They were required to go and retrieve it before being allowed to check in. Diệp Lâm Anh & Thu Hiền and Đức Hưng & Thùy Dung checked in while they went back, dropping Linh Chi and Nhan Phúc Vinh to 4th.
8. Linh Sơn & Đoàn Mạnh served their 30-minute penalty at the start of Leg 8 as they wrote down numbers during the step-counting challenge, which was explicitly prohibited in the clue.
9. Linh Chi & Nhan Phúc Vinh used the Express Pass to bypass the Roadblock in Leg 11. Before using the Express Pass, Nhan Phúc Vinh elected to perform the Roadblock; this is reflected in the total Roadblock count.
10. Diệp Lâm Anh & Thu Hiền and Hari & Tiến Đạt elected not to eat the foul-tasting stew; both teams were issued 45-minute penalties at the site.
11. Linh Chi & Nhan Phúc Vinh initially arrived at the Finish Line 1st, but were issued three ten-minute penalties totalling 30 minutes (one was for using notes during the calligraphy challenge, and two for not abandoning the taxi after the taxi driver incurred a traffic infraction on both times, both of which was prohibited by the rules (one for driving the wrong way down a one-way street and another through a red light)). Diệp Lâm Anh & Thu Hiền checked in during their penalty time first and won, dropping Linh Chi & Nhan Phúc Vinh to 2nd.
12. Đức Hưng was unable to complete the Roadblock due to injuring his hands, and so Thùy Dung was permitted to complete it for him. Since they crossed the Finish Line last, they were not issued a penalty.

== Prizes ==
- Leg 1–The Express Pass (Thẻ Ưu Tiên) – an item that can be used to skip any one task of the team's choosing up until the 11th leg.
- Leg 3 – Two nights at Romana Resort, Phan Thiết and two nights at Amiana Resort, Nha Trang.
- Leg 4 – One night at Sheraton Hotel, Nha Trang.
- Leg 6 – Two nights at Ba Na Resort, Da Nang.
- Leg 8 – Two nights at Sun Spa Resort, Quảng Bình.
- Leg 9 – Two business class round-trip tickets from Hanoi to Singapore and three nights at Ramada Hotel, Singapore.
- Leg 11 – Two vouchers for Suối Hoa Lan Resort, Nha Trang.
- Leg 12:
  - 1st place – 300,000,000₫
  - 2nd place – Two shopping vouchers (Linh Chi & Nhan Phúc Vinh chose to concede the prize to Đức Hưng & Thùy Dung)

== Race summary ==
Full Route

Destinations	Air travel Rail travel Water travel Bus travel Helicopter travel Bicycle travel Gondola travel
Route Markers	Lựa chọn kép (Detour) Vượt rào (Roadblock) Nhảy cóc (Fast Forward); Rào cản (U-Turn) Về đích (Pit Stop)

=== Leg 1 (Ho Chi Minh City) ===
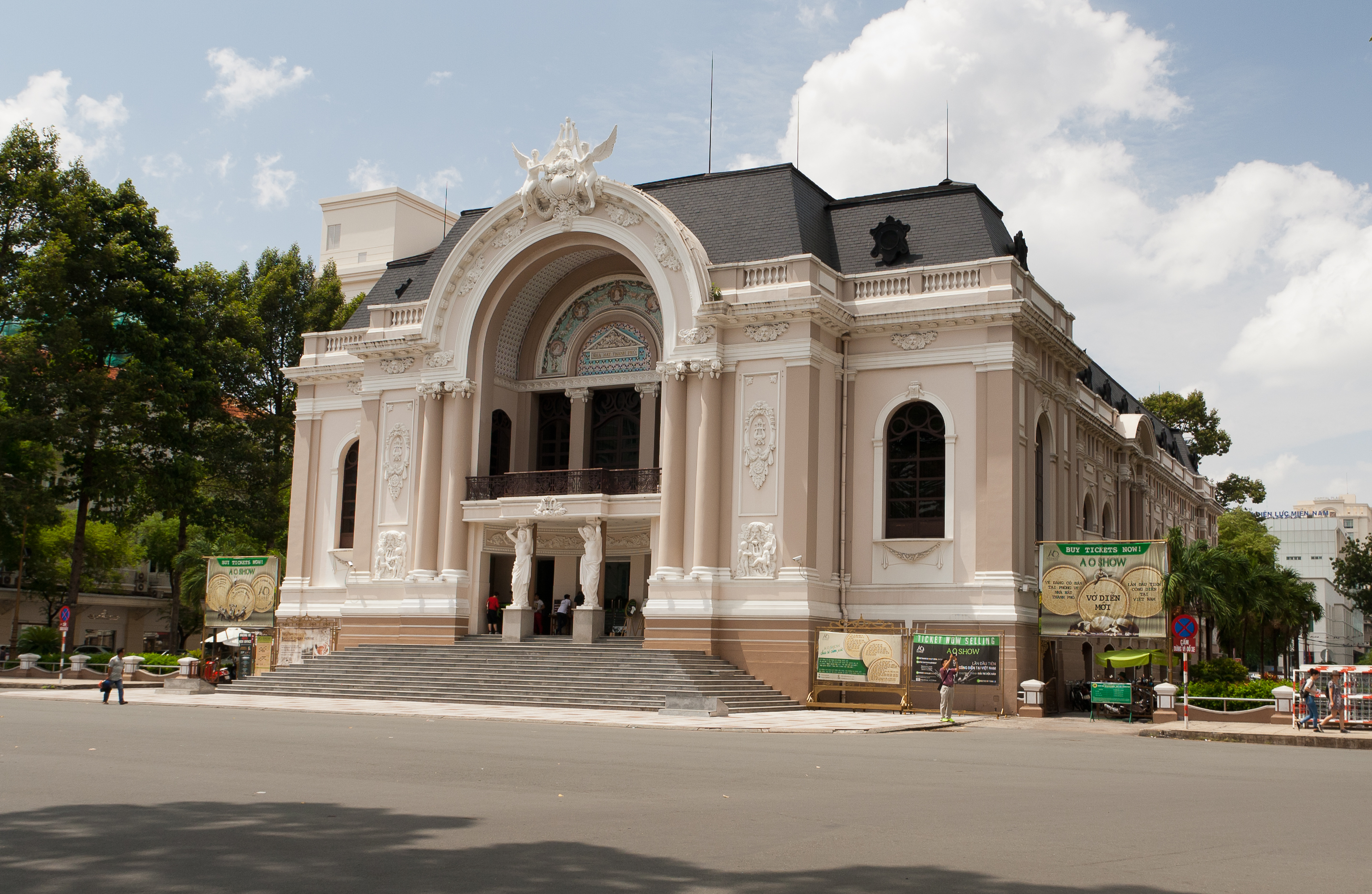
Teams finished their first leg inside the Saigon Opera House.

Airdate: 26 July 2013

- Ho Chi Minh City, Vietnam (Reunification Palace) (Starting Line)
- Ho Chi Minh City (Bitexco Financial Tower – 47th Floor)
- Ho Chi Minh City (Bitexco Financial Tower – BHD Star Cineplex)
- Ho Chi Minh City (Bitexco Financial Tower – Food Creative)
- Ho Chi Minh City (Bến Thành Market or Underground Cafe)
- Ho Chi Minh City (Saigon Opera House)

In this season's first Roadblock, one team member had to enter room number 1 in BHD Cinema Icon 68 and find their next clue, which was hidden under a seat.

This season's first Detour was a choice between Đường Phố (Streets) or Sân Khấu (Stages). In Streets, teams had to sells 500,000₫ worth of peanut taffy (kẹo kéo) from a taffy stall in front of Ben Thanh Market to receive their next clue. In Stages, teams had to sing while standing in four boxes full of worms, caterpillars, swamp-eels, ice cubes and put their head into a box full of rats for each song to receive their next clue.

Additional tasks

- At the Reunification Palace, teams had to find three out of 380 nón lás which form the phrase "Cuộc đua kỳ thú 2013" to receive their next clue.
- At the Bitexco Financial Tower, teams had to travel on foot to the 49th floor, where they had to search for their next clue. Then, teams had to find their next clue outside the BHD Star Cineplex on the third floor.
- After the Roadblock, teams had to find a stall at Food Creative, where each member had to eat three bowls of bún bò to receive their next clue.

=== Leg 2 (Ho Chi Minh City → Cà Mau) ===
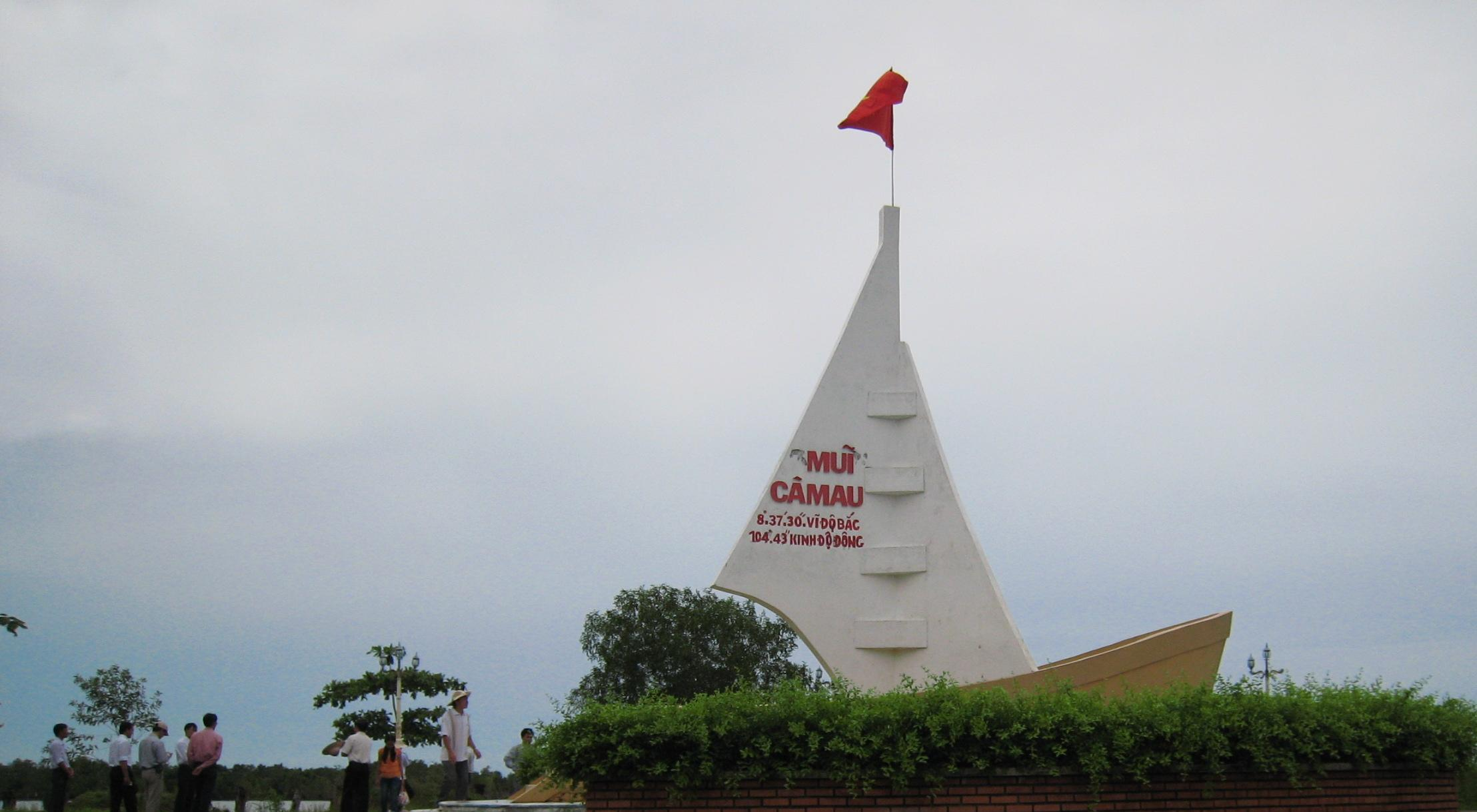
For the second leg, the Pit Stop was located at Cape Cà Mau, the southernmost point of Vietnam.

Airdate: 2 August 2013

- Ho Chi Minh City (Bến Xe Miền Tây) to Cà Mau, Cà Mau province (Bến Xe Khách Cà Mau)
- Cà Mau (Nhà Dây Thép Cà Mau)
- Năm Căn (Ông Tình Bridge to Bến Tàu Tượng Đài)
- Năm Căn (Bến Tàu Tượng Đài) to Đất Mũi (Observatory)
- Đất Mũi (Cape Cà Mau)

This leg's Detour was a choice between Ngư Vụ (Fishery) or Nông Vụ (Crop). In Fishery, teams had to catch 20 fish in a pond and cook them to receive their next clue. In Crop, teams had to properly separate and count the soya beans and moon beans to receive their next clue.

In this leg's Roadblock, one team member had to put a python on their neck and walk up the stairs to the top of the observatory to receive their next clue.

Additional tasks

- After arriving in Cà Mau, teams had to find a history vestige Nhà dây thép Cà Mau (The Old Camau Post Office) through a riddle Built by the French colonial in 1910 to find their first clue.
- Under Ông Tình Bridge, teams had find their next clue hidden from view. Then, they had to patch a bicycle tire and travel by these bicycles to Bến tàu Tượng đài (Monument Port) to find their next clue.
- En route to Đất Mũi, teams had find their next clue hidden in the fishing trap within five minutes. When the time expired, teams had to return to the port and wait for their next turn. After finding the clue in the fishing trap, teams could continue to Đất Mũi.

=== Leg 3 (Cà Mau → Đồng Nai → Bình Thuận) ===
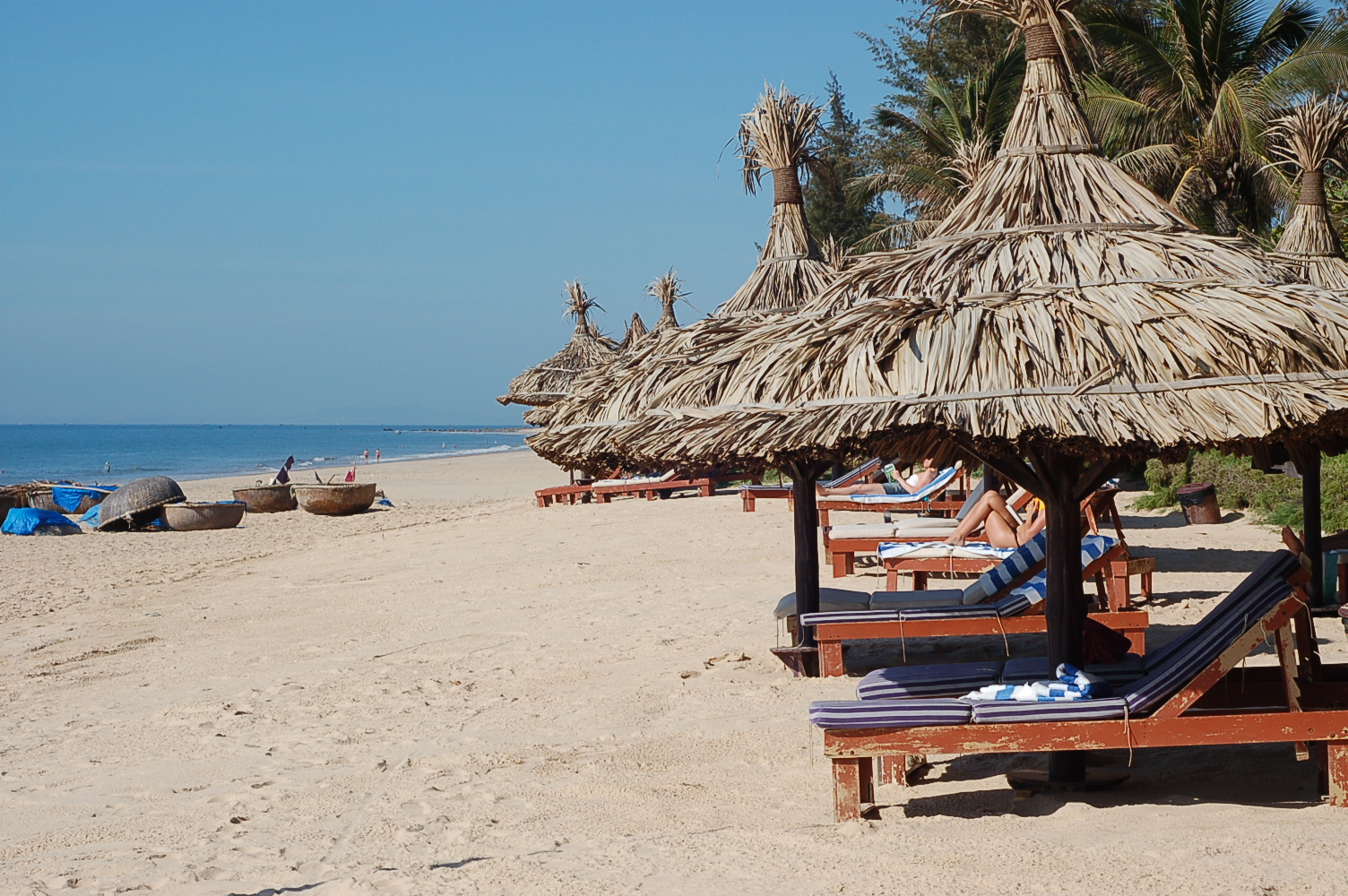
For the third leg, the Pit Stop was located at the Mũi Né beach.

Airdate: 9 August 2013

- Cà Mau (Bến Xe Khách Cà Mau) to Biên Hòa, Đồng Nai province (Bến xe Biên Hòa)
- Long Thành (Đồng Nai Dairy Company)
- Mũi Né, Phan Thiết, Bình Thuận province (Resort Romana)
- Mũi Né, Phan Thiết (Mui Yen Conservation Area)
- Mũi Né, Phan Thiết (Huỳnh Thúc Kháng Road)
- Mũi Né, Phan Thiết (Mui Ne Beach)

This leg's Detour was a choice between Cỏ (Grass) or Sữa (Milk). In Grass, teams had to cut 20 kilograms (44 lb) of pasture grass and take it to feed the cows to receive their next clue. In Milk, teams had to produce two litres (0.44 imp gal; 0.53 US gal) of milk from the cows to receive their next clue.

In this leg's Roadblock, one team member had to paraglide down the hills of Mui Yen to a target on the ground to receive their next clue.

Additional tasks

- At Biên Hòa Station, teams had to search for a taxi driver who was carrying a bag with the show's logo on it.
- At the Resort Romana, one team member would be blindfolded. The other team member would have to direct their partner using noise, but not words, and help them hit and break a series of six hanging pots and balloons in the right order to receive their next clue.
- After the Roadblock, teams received a 500,000₫ banknote and had to turn it into change, with the help of locals, until they at had least one of each denomination of Vietnamese đồng, including all possible banknotes and coins. Teams could then exchange the money at Huỳnh Thúc Kháng Road for their next clue.

=== Leg 4 (Bình Thuận → Khánh Hòa) ===
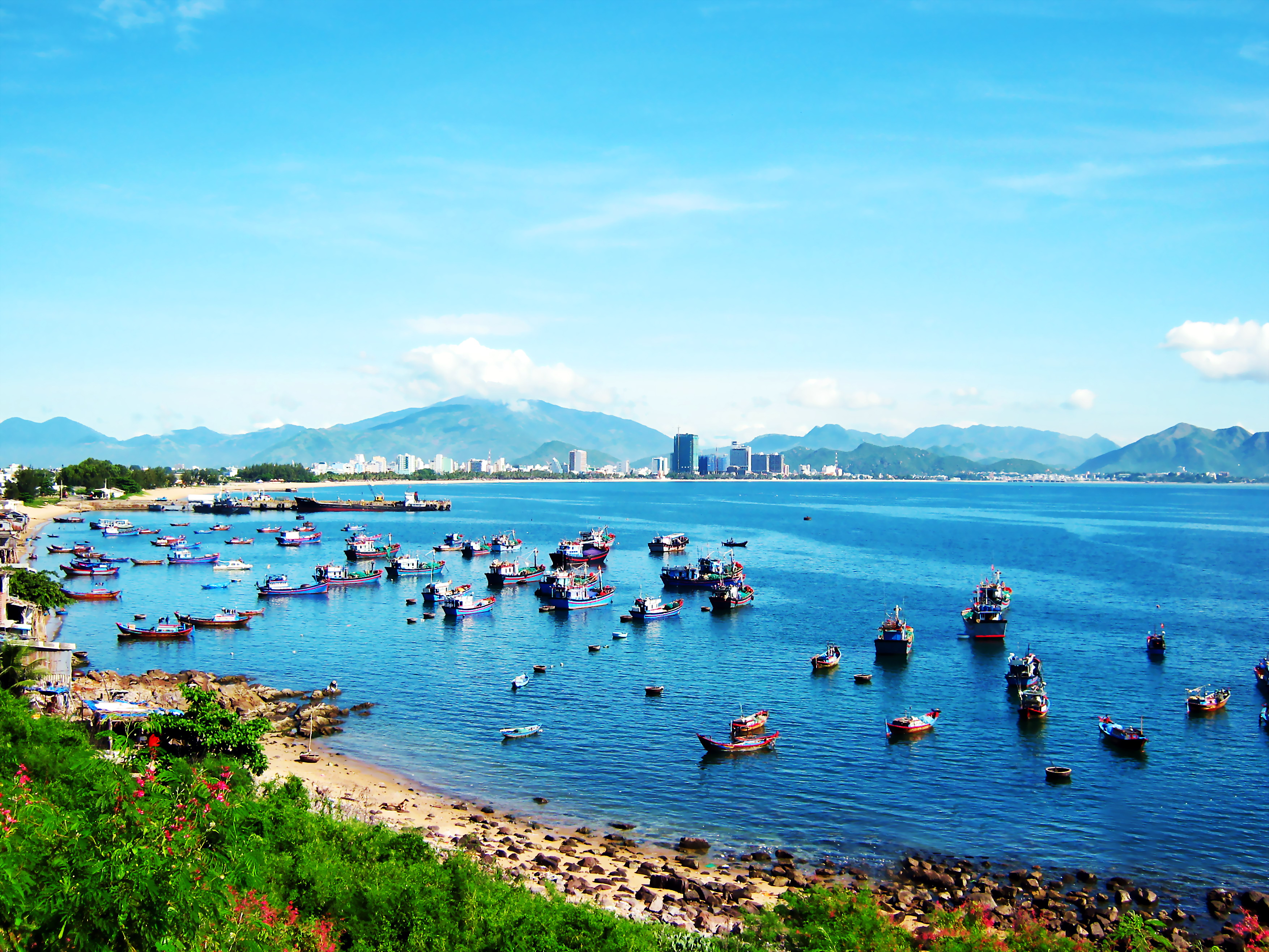
Most of the tasks in Leg 4 took place in the city of Nha Trang.

Airdate: 16 August 2013

- Nha Trang, Khánh Hòa province (Amiana Resort) (Pit Start)
- Vĩnh Lương (Long Phú Wharf)
- Vĩnh Lương (Monkey Island)
- Ninh Vân (Suối Hoa Lan Ecotourism Zone)
- Nha Trang (Sheraton Nha Trang)

In this leg's Roadblock, one team member had to snorkel in the water and search for an underwater coconut with the next location inside.

This leg's Detour was a choice between Cá (Fish) or Chim (Birds). In Fish, teams had to pick up a tied up crocodile and deliver it on foot across the ecotourism zone to a marked hut to receive their next clue. In Birds, teams had to ride an ostrich around a marked course while holding a glass of Sting energy drink with only one hand. If teams spilled less than the designated line on the glass, they would receive their next clue.

Additional tasks

- At Amiana Resort, teams had to go to the Bacaro Restaurant and count the number of properly set places at tables (84) to receive their next clue. If teams give an incorrect answer, they would be penalized ten minutes.
- After the Roadblock, teams would be taken by rowboat to Monkey Island.
- After the Detour, one team member had to ride a zipline through the ecotourism zone across a pond. The other team member would be standing on an island in the pond and carrying a bucket. The one riding the zipline had to throw the ball into their partner's bucket to get the next clue. If they failed, they would incur a 15-minute penalty and then had to try again.
- At the Sheraton, teams had to find the cooking school on the sixth floor. There, they had to properly make a bundle of noodles following a traditional method and use them to make a bowl of phở.
- After the cooking task, teams made their way to the hotel's pool. There, both team members would have their hands tied behind their back, and they would then have to eat a cake to find a passcard to the 30th floor baked inside and receive their next clue.

=== Leg 5 (Khánh Hòa → Đắk Lắk & Đắk Nông) ===
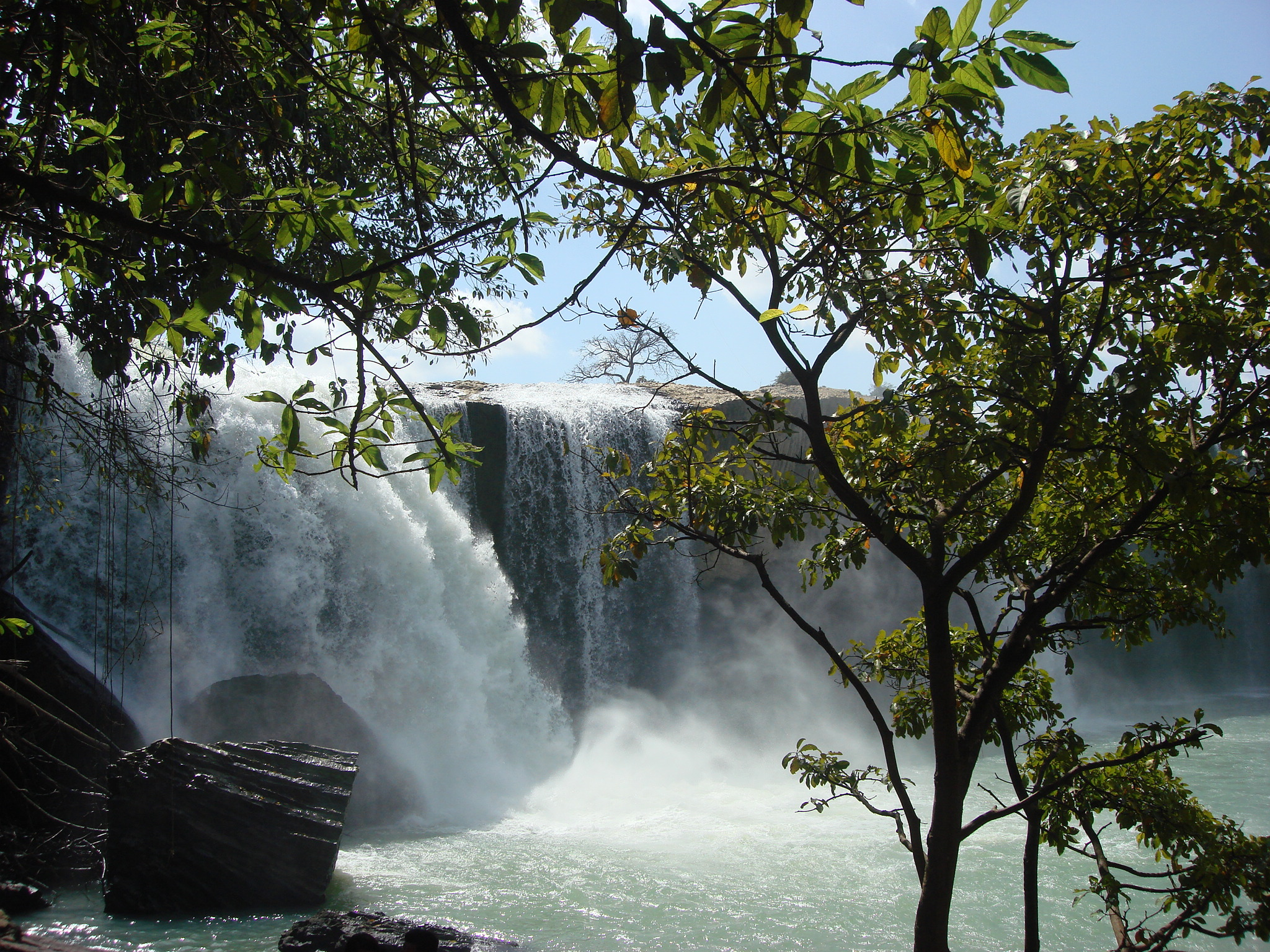
The Đray Nur Waterfall served as the site of the Roadblock in Leg 5.

Airdate: 23 August 2013

- Nha Trang (Bến Xe Phía Nam) to Buôn Ma Thuột, Đắk Lắk province (Bến Xe Phía Bắc)
- Buôn Đôn, Buôn Ma Thuột (Ancient House of Ama Kong) (Overnight Rest)
- Buôn Đôn, Buôn Ma Thuột (Suspension Bridge Centre)
- Cư Jút, Đắk Nông province (Coffee Plantation or Brick Factory)
- Buôn Ma Thuột, Đắk Lắk province (Đray Nur Waterfall (in Vietnamese))
- Srepok River, Đắk Nông province (Đray Sáp Waterfall (in Vietnamese))
- Srepok River (Đray Sáp Longhouse)

This leg's Detour was a choice between Cây (Tree) or Đất (Soil). In Tree, teams had to count the number of coffee trees in a marked area. Using this number and following a selection of information, teams had to solve complex math problems to determine how much raw coffee seeds, dried coffee seeds, processed coffee seeds and coffee powder could be created with this amount of trees to receive their next clue. In Soil, teams had to use an old cart to transport 250 unbroken bricks along a bumpy road to receive their next clue.

In this leg's Roadblock, one team member had to swim up river to the base of the waterfall and then climb a rope ladder to the top. After getting their clue, they would rappel back down and reunite with their partner.

Additional tasks

- After getting their clue from the house of Ama Kong, teams had to find a local from the ancient village who would let them sleep overnight at their house. Afterwards, they would be released the next morning in the order they gained approval.
- At the Suspension Bridge Centre, teams would hear the sound of a gong and had five minutes to figure out which gong had been hit to receive their next clue.
- At Đray Sáp Waterfall, one team member had to rappel down to the bottom of the waterfall, where they would be told a four-digit combination. They had to shout these numbers to their partner on the other side of the river, amongst the roar of the waterfall. This combination would open up a chest that the team member on the shore has, which contained their next clue.

=== Leg 6 (Đắk Nông → Quảng Nam → Da Nang) ===
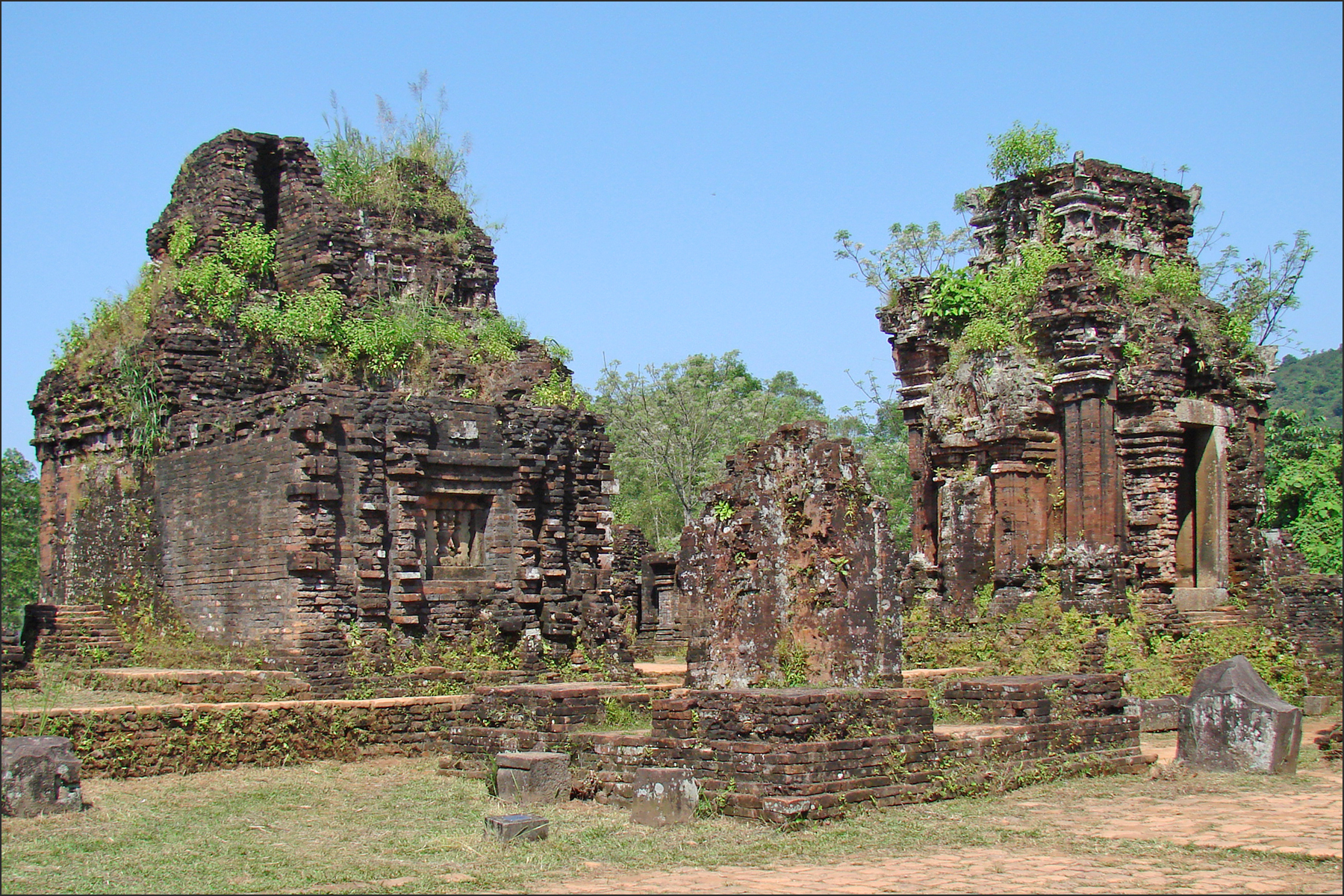
Once in Da Nang, teams were told to go to the Mỹ Sơn Ruins in Quảng Nam.

Airdate: 30 August 2013

- Buôn Ma Thuột (Buôn Ma Thuột Airport) to Da Nang (Da Nang International Airport)
- Duy Phú, Quảng Nam province (Mỹ Sơn)
- Duy Vinh (Sedge Mats) (Overnight Rest)
- Da Nang (Sculpture Park)
- Da Nang (Da Nang Diving Club)
- Da Nang (Bà Nà Hills)
- Da Nang (Tien Son Sports Stadium)

In this leg's Roadblock, one team member had to dive to the bottom of a swimming pool and use a set of keys to unlock boxes until they found a bottle of Sting Energy Drink. They then were lifted by pulley up to the building's roof, where they had to throw the bottle into a basket to receive their next clue. Racers had 90 seconds to complete the diving portion and one minute to complete the throwing portion. If either of these time limits expired, racers had to move to the back of the queue.

This leg's Detour was a choice between Tháp Cao (High Tower) or Hầm Sâu (Deep Tunnels). In High Tower, teams had to take a cable car to the highest point of the Bà Nà Hills, where they would enter a castle. They had to climb up thousands of spiraling stairs and take five boards with random numbers one at a time back to the bottom of the stairs so that they came to an exact total of 20,000 to receive their next clue. In Deep Tunnels, teams traveled by cable car to the largest wine cellar in Da Nang and had search among thousands of wine bottles for one with an Amazing Race flag attached to it to receive their next clue. During this Detour task, one leg of each team member would be tied together.

Additional tasks

- At the Mỹ Sơn ruins, teams had to search amongst many fake clay toys for five real ones to receive their next clue. The real ones could be identified because they could be played as a horn. During this task, team members were forbidden to talk to one another.
- After the Mỹ Sơn task, teams were told to find a local village whose famous local product is related to sleeping. They had to figure out that this related to the sedge mats of Duy Vinh.
- In Duy Vinh, teams had to deliver three sledge mats at once to a woman's house using a bicycle. They would then stay there overnight before resuming the leg in Da Nang in the morning.

=== Leg 7 (Da Nang → Quảng Bình) ===
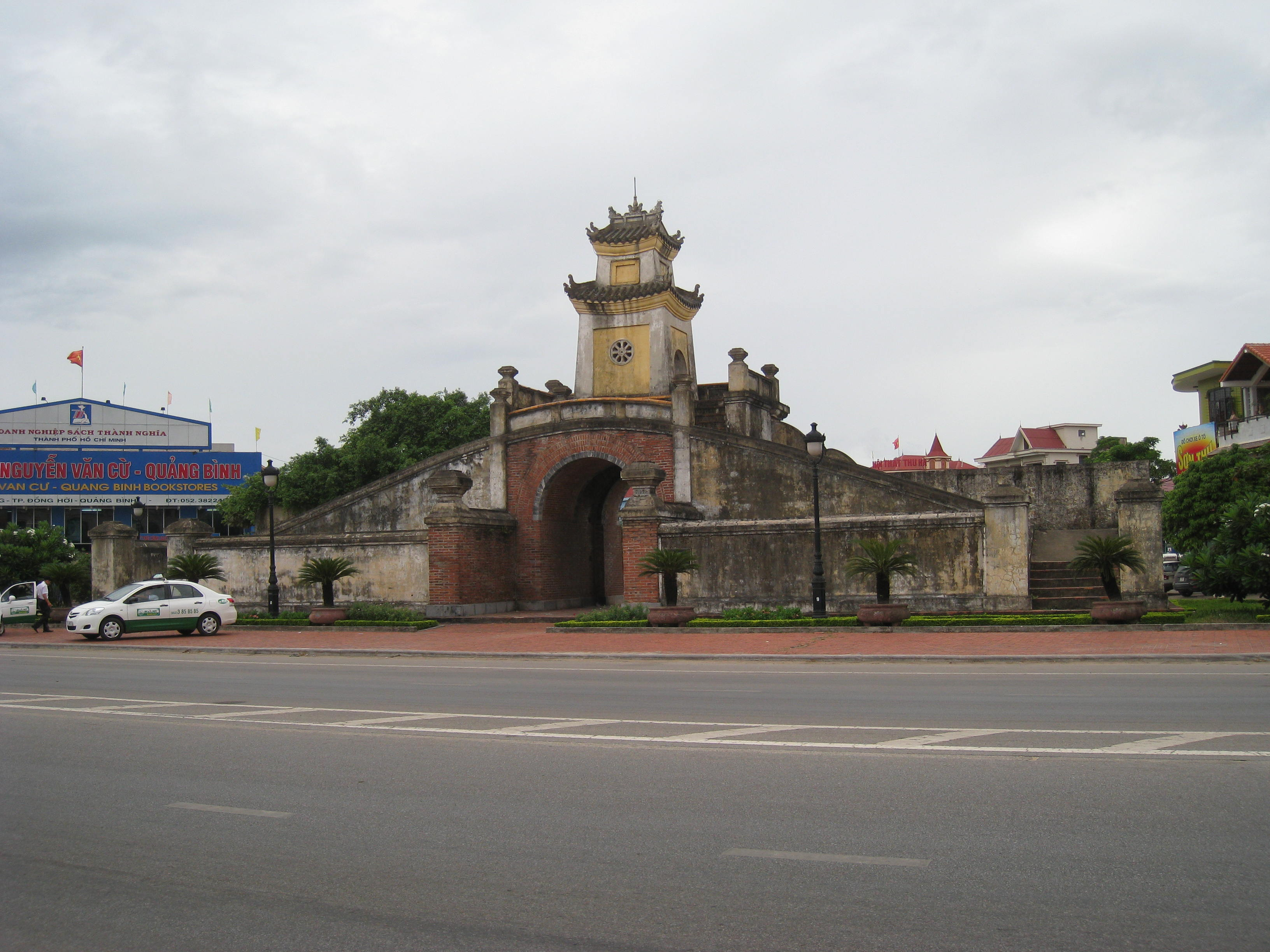
Teams started Leg 7 at the Đồng Hới Citadel in Quảng Bình province.

Airdate: 6 September 2013

- Đồng Hới, Quảng Bình province (Đồng Hới Citadel) (Pit Start)
- Đồng Hới (Mẹ Suốt Statue)
- Son Trach (Paradise Cave)
- Đồng Hới (Tuyết Family House)
- Đồng Hới (Cocos Coffee Shop)
- Đồng Hới (Home of Hà Thị Viễn)
- Đồng Hới (Sun Spa Resort)

In this leg's Roadblock, one team member had to build a traditional broom from scratch to receive their next clue.

Additional tasks

- At the Mẹ Suốt statue, teams had to listen to a performance of a love song, and then had to learn the lyrics and perform it themselves to receive their next clue.
- At Paradise Cave, teams had to count the number of steps in a marked area to receive their next clue.
- At Cocos Coffee Shop, teams had to look for a man named "Phúc" who would give them their next clue and a gift, which they would later give to Hà Thị Viễn.

=== Leg 8 (Quảng Bình) ===
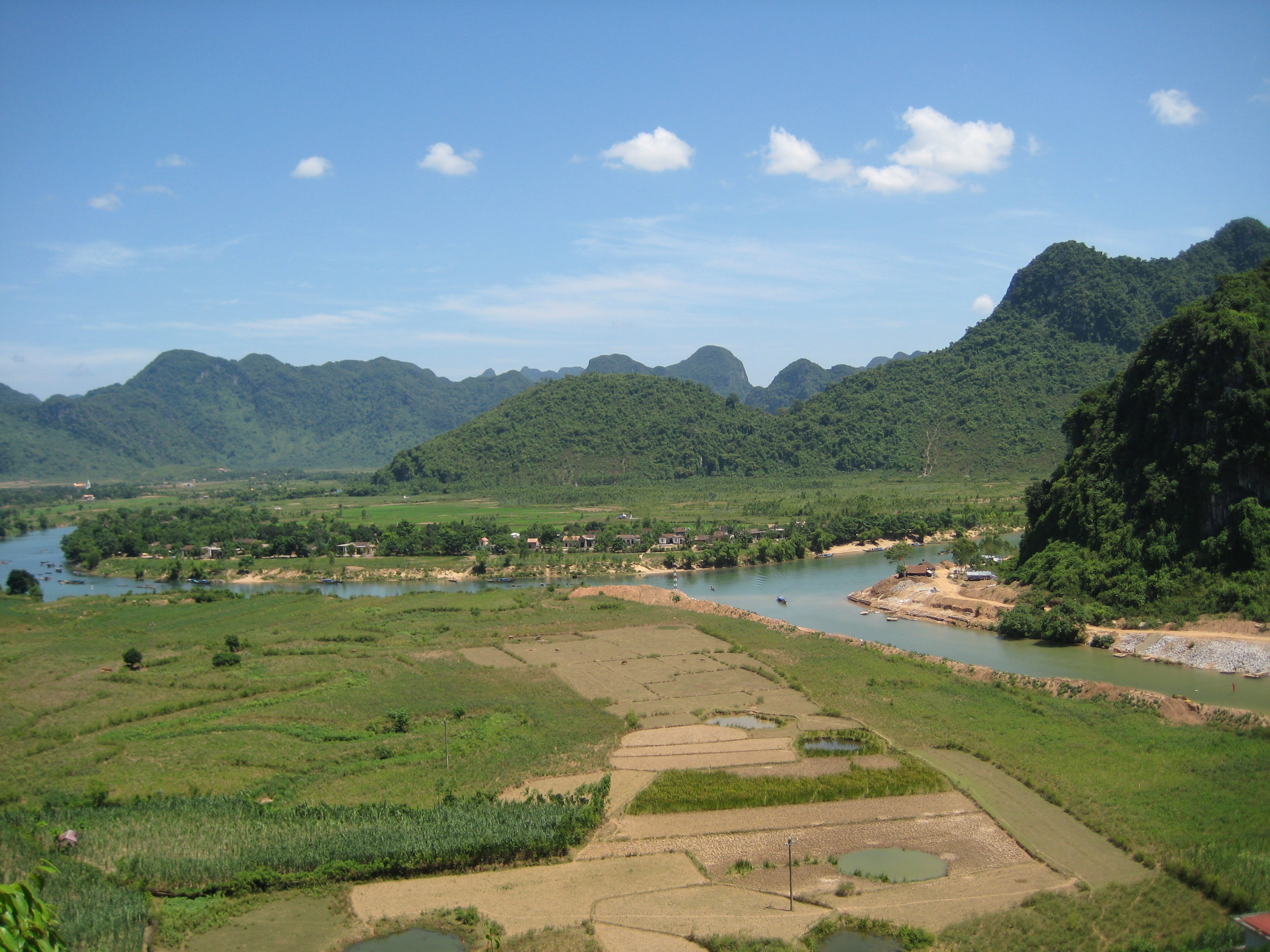
For the eight leg, teams visited Phong Nha-Kẻ Bàng National Park in Quảng Bình.

Airdate: 13 September 2013

- Phong Nha-Kẻ Bàng National Park (Ho Chi Minh Highway) (Pit Start)
- Phong Nha-Kẻ Bàng National Park (Bản Đoòng Village)
- Phong Nha-Kẻ Bàng National Park (Én Cave)
- Phong Nha-Kẻ Bàng National Park (Bãi Columns)
- Phong Nha-Kẻ Bàng National Park (Son Doong Cave) (Overnight Rest)
- Phong Nha-Kẻ Bàng National Park (Én Cave Entrance)

This leg's Detour was a choice between Học (Learn) or Thực Hành (Practice). In Learn, teams would have to teach a young child from the village (who did not speak Vietnamese very well) to write out a short Vietnamese poem with good handwriting to receive their next clue. In Practice, teams had to carry a bucket down to the river, fill it up, and then water some plants to the satisfaction of a local to receive their next clue.

In this leg's Roadblock, one team member had to eat a serving of unpleasant-tasting food, including specially-prepared rice, fish and sauce to receive their next clue.

Additional tasks

- From the Ho Chi Minh Highway, teams had to hike three kilometres (1.9 mi) to Bản Đoòng Village to find their next clue.
- At Son Doong cave, teams had to build a shelter out of sticks and leaves, then gather firewood to start a fire and heat a pot of water. Teams spent the night in these shelters.
- In the morning, teams would enter the cave and would have to carefully traverse around a series of ropes. If they disturbed any of the ropes and rang the bells attached to them, they would have to start again. After completing this task, they would receive their next clue from Howard Limbert, a University of Hanoi alumni who explored the cave in 1990.
- Deeper inside of Son Doong cave, teams would have to rappel down 70 metres (230 ft) into the cave and search the labyrinth inside for their next clue, which was hidden away. They would also meet Hồ Khanh, who discovered the cave.

=== Leg 9 (Quảng Bình → Singapore) ===
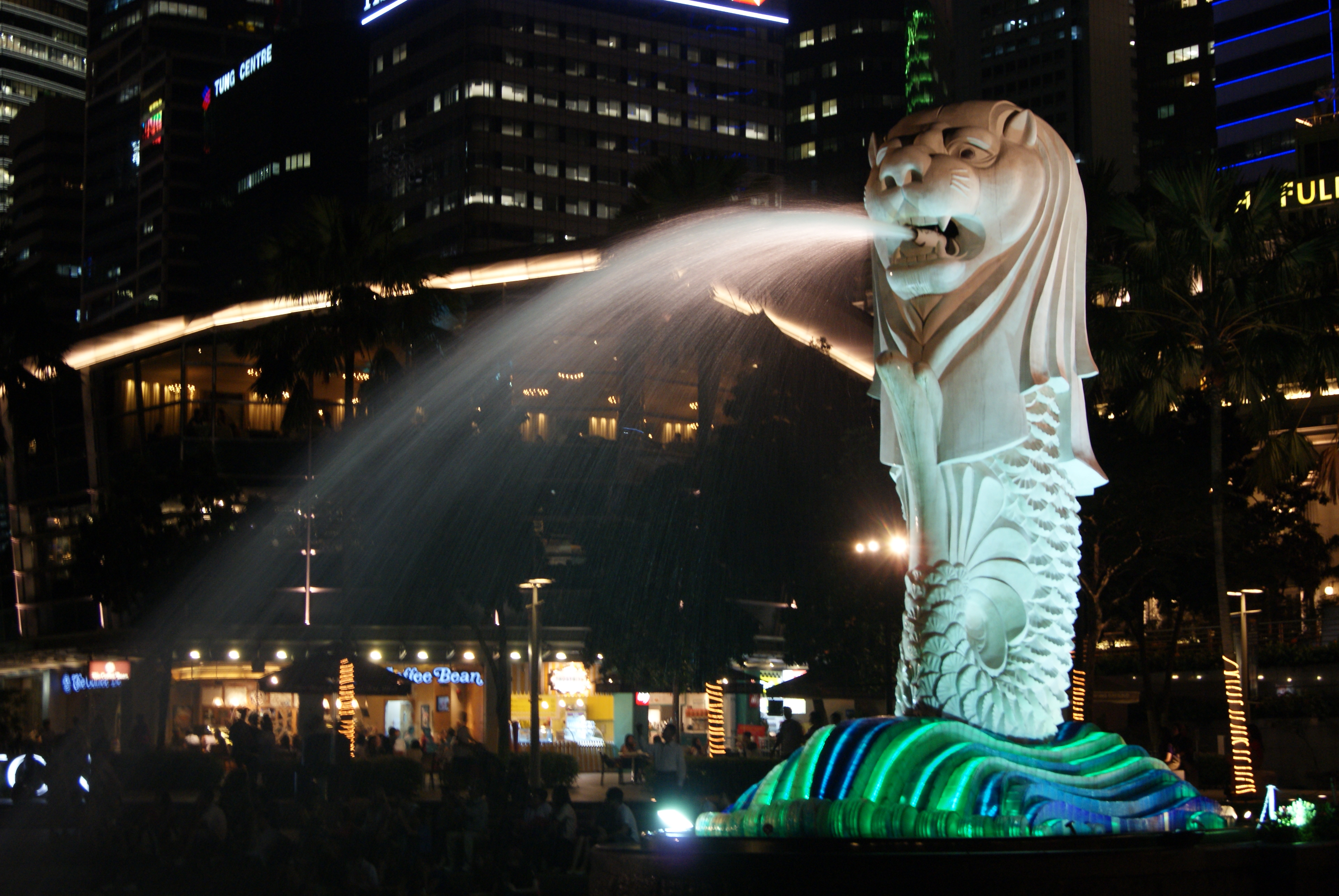
Teams visited Singapore for this leg. They were instructed to get their first clue at the Merlion Park, overlooking the Merlion Statue.

Airdate: 20 September 2013

- Hanoi (International Centre – Singapore Airlines Hanoi Office)
- Hanoi (Noi Bai International Airport) to Singapore (Changi Airport)
- Singapore (Merlion Park)
- Singapore (Days Hotel Zhongshan Park) (Overnight Rest)
- Singapore (Flight Experience Singapore)
- Singapore (VivoCity – Food Republic)
- Singapore (Sentosa – iFly Center)
- Singapore (G-Max Reverse Bungy)
- Singapore (Gardens by the Bay)

In this leg's first Roadblock, one team member had to properly complete a flight simulation training exercise to receive their next clue.

In this leg's second Roadblock, one team member would experience a skydiving simulation inside of a vertical wind tunnel and had to successfully rise to the top of the tunnel to receive their next clue.

Additional tasks

- At Merlion Park, teams had to look for a lady who had their next clue.
- At the Days Hotel, teams would observe a properly made hotel room. Then, they had to properly make another room to the hotel's standards to receive a departure time for the next morning.
- At VivoCity's Food Republic, teams had to make ten Singaporean powdered cakes to receive their next clue.
- At the G-Max Reverse Bungee, teams had to take a ride on the wild bungee ride. Then, once on the ground, they had to thread ten needles within three minutes to receive their clue. Otherwise, they would have start threading over again.

=== Leg 10 (Singapore → Hanoi → Haiphong) ===
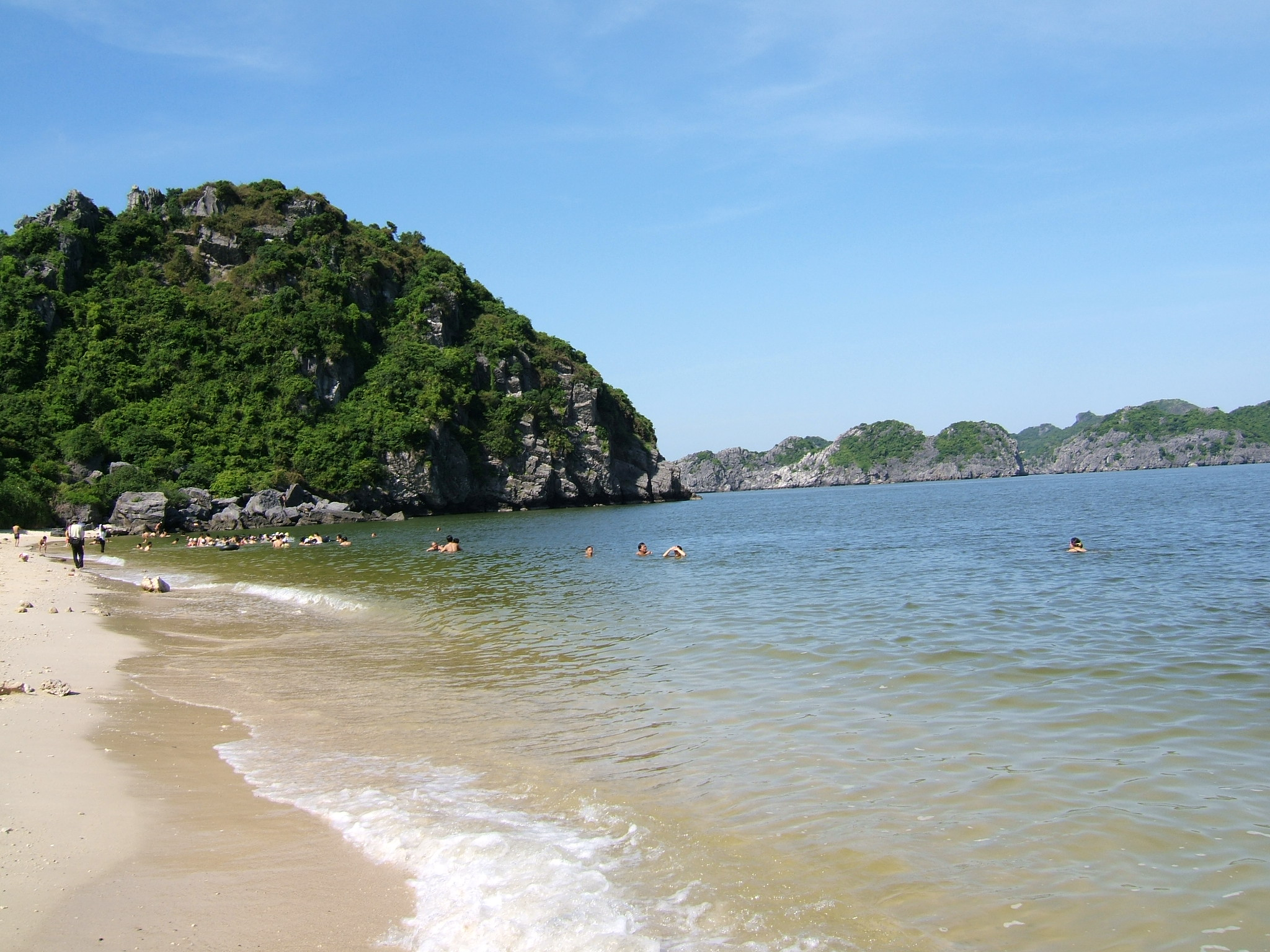
Monkey Island in Cát Bà served as the season's 10th Pit Stop.

Airdate: 27 September 2013

- Singapore (Changi Airport) to Hanoi, Vietnam (Noi Bai International Airport)
- Hanoi to Haiphong
- Hai Phong to Cát Bà (Gia Luận Ferry Landing)
- Cát Bà (Bến Bèo)
  - Cát Bà (Cát Bà Main Pier and Cát Cò Beach 3)
- Cát Bà (Prince Beach 2)
- Cát Bà (Prince Beach 1)
- Cát Bà (Prince Beach 2)
- Cát Bà (Jade Mountains)
- Cát Bà (Monkey Island)

In this season's only Fast Forward, both team members had to completely shave each other's heads. They then had to travel to Cát Cò Beach 3, where they had to stand outside of a box in the sand and headbutt a volleyball to each other five times without letting it touch the ground to win the Fast Forward award.

In this leg's Roadblock, one team member had to rock climb up a sheer cliff face to retrieve a bottle of Sting and three eggs from baskets to receive their next clue.

Additional tasks

- Teams traveled from Gia Luận to Bến Bèo by motorbikes.
- At Prince Beach 2, teams had to search under many sandcastles for their next clue. Any sandcastle they destroyed, they would have to rebuild.
- Teams traveled from Prince Beach 2 to Prince Beach 1 and back again by kayak.
- At Prince Beach 1, one team member would ride a parasail behind a motorboat and would pass over five basket boats in the water with coloured panels. They would then have to place markers on a board, recalling the order of the coloured panels they saw. The other team member would have to paddle their kayak out to pick them up. If teams were correct, they would receive their next clue.
- After returning to Prince Beach 2, both teams had to climb on top of a buoyant platform in the water and balance atop it. One team member had to perform a series of poses, while the other photographed them to receive their next clue.

=== Leg 11 (Haiphong → Lào Cai) ===
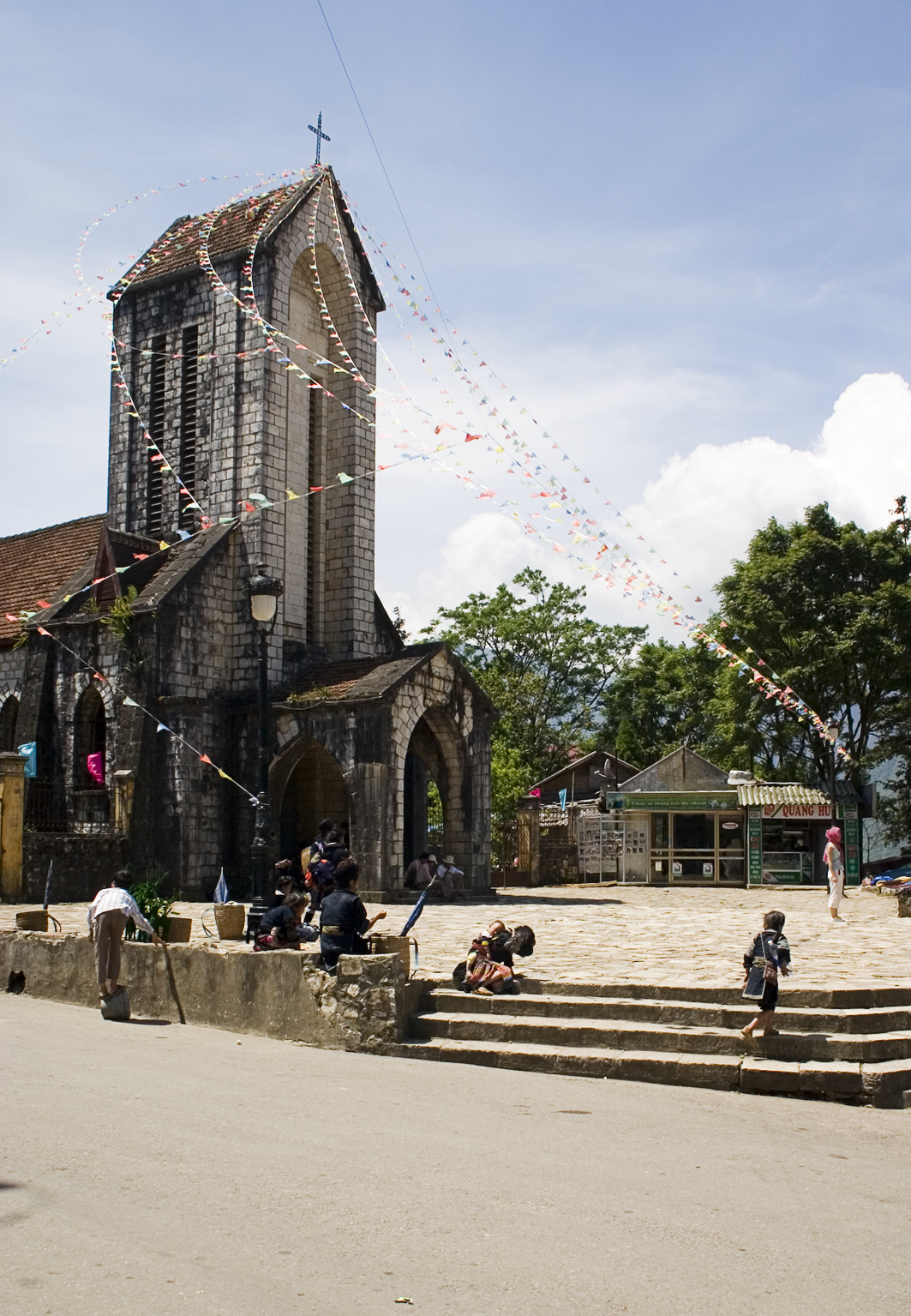
Teams visited the Stone Church in Sa Pa during Leg 11.

Airdate: 4 October 2013

- Hanoi (Hanoi railway station) to Lào Cai, Lào Cai province (Lào Cai railway station)
- Sa Pa (Stone Church)
- Sa Pa (Vinh Mai Art Shop)
- Sa Pa (Ta Phin – Ly Sai Sen's House)
- Sa Pa (Sin Chai – San Sả Hồ Community)
- Sa Pa (Mount Sẻ – Ranger Station)
- Sa Pa (Mount Sẻ – 2200m Rest Station)
- Sa Pa (Cát Cát – Vọng Cảnh Observation Point)

In this leg's Roadblock, one team member had to properly sew an intricate floral pattern onto traditional clothing using a needle and thread to receive their next clue.

This leg's Detour was a choice between Động Vật (Animal) or Thực Vật (Plants). In Animal, teams had to chase after a tiny piglet with a number attached and corral it into the corresponding pen to receive their next clue. They could not touch it or bribe it with food. In Plants, teams had to use a carabao to plow a marked section of a muddy field and then plant rice seedlings to receive their next clue.

Additional tasks

- At the Vinh Mai Art Shop, teams had to dress in traditional outfits from the Red Dao minority group matching a given mannequin within five minutes, which they would wear during the next task, to receive their next clue.
- Before ascending Mount Sẻ, teams would pick up provisions from the ranger station at the base. Unbeknownst to them, this food would be pig's meat, and teams would have to chop 500 grams (1.1 lb) off of a pig to receive their next clue. If not, they would have to start again with a new pig. After this, team members had to each eat a serving of Thang Co, a traditional stew made with animal entrails, to receive their next clue.
- 2200m up Mount Sẻ, teams had to play Ném Còn by having one team member throw a traditional toy through a hoop that was extremely high in the air, and the other team member had to catch it to receive their next clue.

=== Leg 12 (Lào Cai → Hanoi) ===
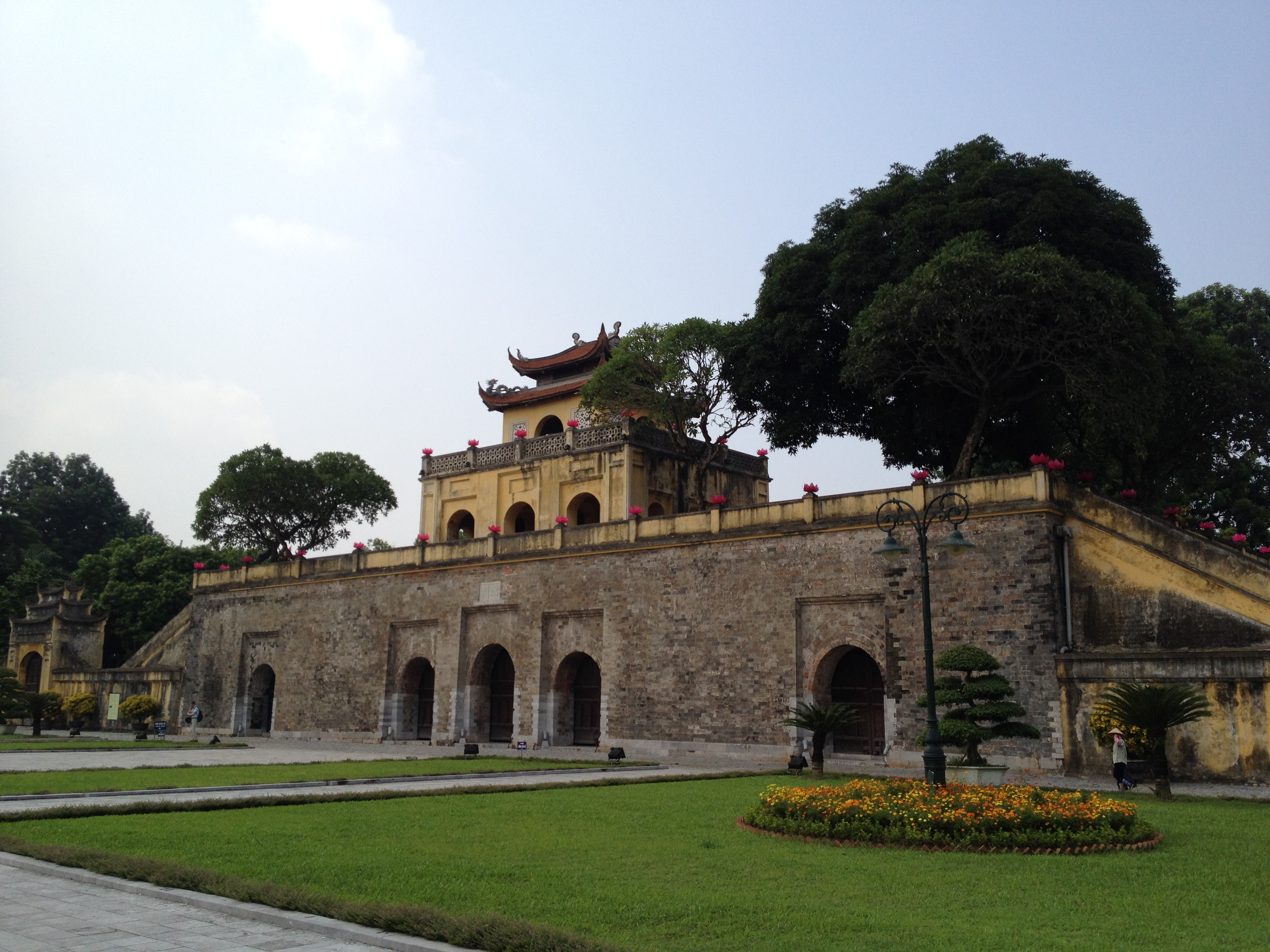
The historic Imperial Citadel of Thăng Long served as the Finish Line for the second season of The Amazing Race Vietnam.

Airdate: 18 October 2013

- Lào Cai (Lào Cai railway station) to Hanoi (Hanoi Railway Station) (Pit Start)
- Hanoi (Vietnam National Museum of Fine Arts)
- Hanoi (Thăng Long Water Puppet Theatre or National Library of Vietnam)
- Hanoi (Hoàn Kiếm Lake)
- Hanoi (The Garden Shopping Center)
- Hanoi (Imperial Citadel of Thăng Long)

This season's final Detour was a choice between Múa Rối Nước (Water Puppet) or Thư Viện (Library). In Water Puppet, teams had to learn and perform a water puppet performance to a panel of judges to receive their next clue. In Library, teams received a partially filled key for pigpen cipher and had to use this to translate a series of codes, which they had to use to retrieve certain books from the shelves of the library that they could exchange for their next clue.

In this season's final Roadblock, one team member had to participate in a firefighting training exercise. They had to climb a rope up a building, shimmy around a ledge, and then ascend to the top. There, they would 'rescue' their partner and use the ladder-equipped fire truck to bring them down to safety to receive their next clue.

Additional tasks

- From the Hanoi railway station, teams had to find a store selling old propaganda posters, purchase one, and deliver it to the Museum of Fine Arts to receive their next clue.
- At Hoàn Kiếm Lake, teams had to properly use calligraphy to draw six Chinese characters to receive their final clue. If they drew any incorrectly, they would have to serve a short penalty before trying again.
- At the Imperial Citadel of Thăng Long, teams had to complete a sliding puzzle of the locations they visited during the season. Once it was completed, they could proceed to the finish line while carrying the puzzle with them.
