= Năm Căn =

Năm Căn Phường Năm Căn
- Ward
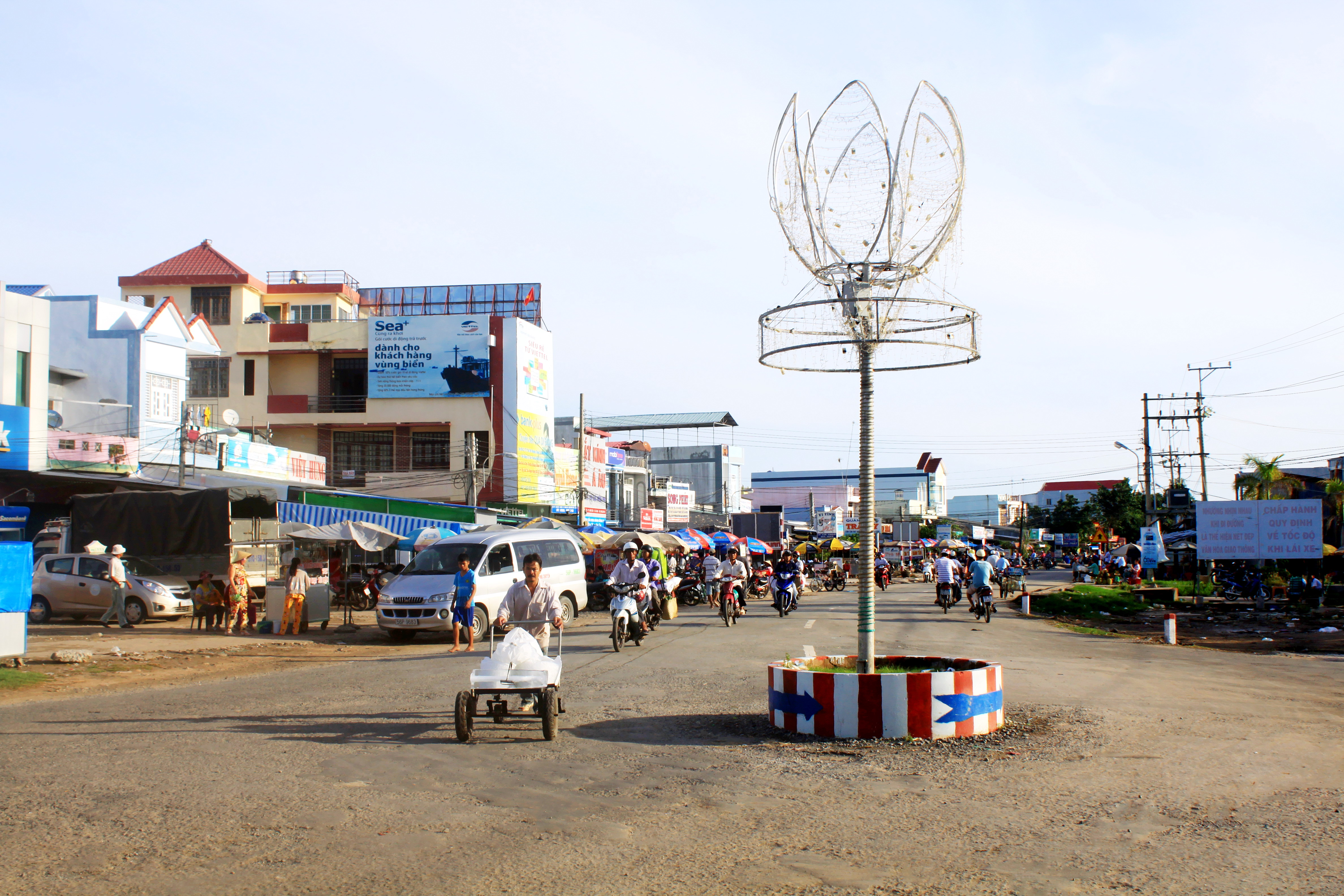
- Năm Căn Post Office Roundabout

- Location in Vietnam
- Coordinates: 8°49′N 105°1′E
- Country: Vietnam
- Province: Cà Mau
- Establish: June 16, 2025

Area
  - Total: 70.21 km^{2} (27.11 sq mi)

Population 2025
  - Total: 30.135 people
  - Density: 0.4292/km^{2} (1.112/sq mi)
- Time zone: UTC+07:00
- Website: namcan.camau.gov.vn

Năm Căn is a ward (phường) of Cà Mau province, in Vietnam.

The Standing Committee of the National Assembly issued Resolution No. 1655/NQ-UBTVQH15 on the rearrangement of commune-level administrative units of Cà Mau Province in 2025 (the resolution takes effect from 16 June 2025). Accordingly, Năm Căn Commune was established in Cà Mau Province on the basis of the entire natural area of 24.8 km^{2} and a population of 8,023 people of Hàng Vịnh Commune; the adjustment of 36.98 km^{2} in natural area with a population of 7,002 people from the remaining part of Hàm Rồng Commune; and the adjustment of 8.28 km^{2} in natural area with a population of 15,110 people from the remaining part of Năm Căn Township, all belonging to Năm Căn District.

== Geography ==
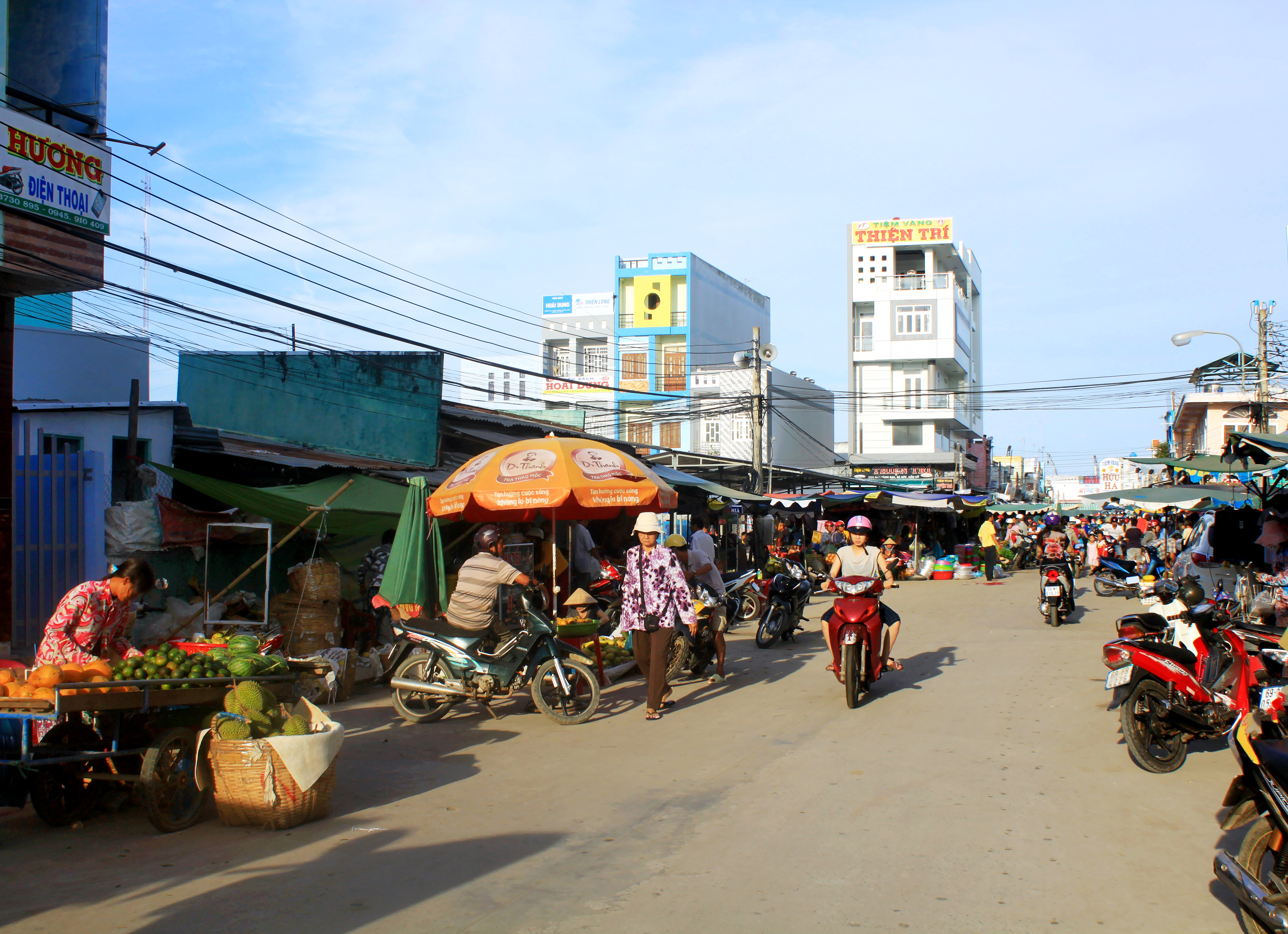
A corner of Năm Căn Market

Năm Căn Commune has the following geographical location:

- To the east, it borders Quách Phẩm Commune and Tam Giang Commune.
- To the west, it borders Đất Mới Commune.
- To the south, it borders Tân Ân Commune.
- To the north, it borders Cái Nước Commune. Năm Căn Commune covers an area of 70.21 km^{2} and had a population of 31,182 people in 2025, resulting in a population density of 0 people/km^{2}.

This is the southern end of Vietnam's National Route 1.

== Administration divisions ==
Năm Căn Commune is divided into 18 hamlets: 1, 2, 4, 6, 7, 8, Cái Nai, Cái Nẩy, Chống Mỹ, Chống Mỹ A, Chống Mỹ B, Hàm Rồng, Hàng Vịnh, Kinh Tắc, Truyền Huấn, Xóm Lớn, Xóm Lớn Ngoài, and Xóm Lớn Trong.

== History ==
After 1975, Năm Căn commune belonged to Ngọc Hiển district, Cà Mau province.

On September 20, 1975, the Politburo issued Resolution No. 245-NQ/TW on the merger of provinces. Bac Lieu, Cà Mau province and 2 districts An Biên, Vĩnh Thuận (excluding Đông Yên and Tây Yên communes) of Rạch Giá province will be merged into a new province. The name of the new province and the location of the provincial capital will be proposed by the local authorities.

On December 20, 1975, the Politburo issued Resolution No. 19/NQ on the merging of several provinces in the South. on the merging of provinces Bạc Liêu and Cà Mau province will be merged into one new province. The name of the new province and the location of its capital will be proposed by the local authorities.

On February 24, 1976, the Provisional Revolutionary Government of the Republic of South Vietnam issued Decree No. 3/NQ/1976. regarding the merger of Bạc Liêu province and Cà Mau province into a new province, named Bạc Liêu – Cà Mau province.

On March 10, 1976, the Government issued a Resolution regarding the establishment of Minh Hải province on the basis of renaming Bạc Liêu – Cà Mau province.

On July 25, 1979, the Government Council issued Decision No. 275-CP regarding the adjustment of boundaries of some communes and towns in Minh Hai province issued by the Government Council. concerning the division of Năm Căn commune in Ngọc Hiển district into two communes: Hàm Rồng and Đất Mới, and Năm Căn town.

On December 17, 1984, the Government Council issued Decision No. 168-HĐBT regarding the renaming of Ngọc Hiển district to Ngọc Hiển district and Năm Căn town to become the district capital of Ngọc Hiển district.

On February 14, 1987, the Council of Ministers issued Decision No. 33B-HĐBT regarding:

- Dissolving Năm Căn town in Ngọc Hiển district to establish Hàng Vịnh commune based on the area and population of the former Năm Căn town.
- Dividing Đất Mới commune into Đất Mới commune and Năm Căn town (the district capital of Ngọc Hiển district).

After demarcation and adjustment of administrative boundaries:

- Năm Căn town has 1,200 hectares of land and 2,497 inhabitants.
- Hàng Vịnh commune has 2,200 hectares of land and 5,550 inhabitants.

On November 6, 1996, the National Assembly issued a Resolution regarding the division of Minh Hải into Bạc Liêu and Cà Mau provinces.

On November 17, 2003, the Government issued Decree No. 138/2003/ND-CP concerning:

- Establishing Nam Can in Cà Mau province on the basis of a part of Ngọc Hiển district.
- Transfer the town of Năm Căn and the commune of Hàng Vịnh from Ngọc Hiển district to the newly established Năm Căn district, and Năm Căn town will become the district capital of Năm Căn district.

On June 12, 2025, the National Assembly issued Resolution No. 202/2025/QH15 Regarding the reorganization of provincial-level administrative units (resolution effective from June 12, 2025). Accordingly, the province of Bạc Liêu will be merged into the province of Cà Mau.

June 16, 2025:

- The National Assembly issued Resolution No. 203/2025/QH15 regarding the amendment and supplementation of certain articles of the Constitution of the Socialist Republic of Vietnam. Accordingly, the operation of district-level administrative units nationwide will end from July 1, 2025.
- The Standing Committee of the National Assembly issued Resolution No. 1655/NQ-UBTVQH15 regarding the arrangement of commune-level administrative units of Ca Mau province in 2025 (resolution effective from June 16, 2025). Accordingly, the commune of Nam Can is established in Cà Mau province based on the entire 24.8 km^{2} natural area and a population of 8,023 people of Hang Vinh commune; Adjusting 36.98 km^{2} of natural area, with a population of 7,002 people, for the remaining part of Ham Rong commune and 8.28 km^{2} of natural area, with a population of 15,110 people, for the remaining part of Năm Căn town in Năm Căn district.

Năm Căn commune has a natural area of 70.06 km^{2} and a population of 30,135 people.
