= Cape Cà Mau =

Cape Cà Mau Mũi Cà Mau
- Cape
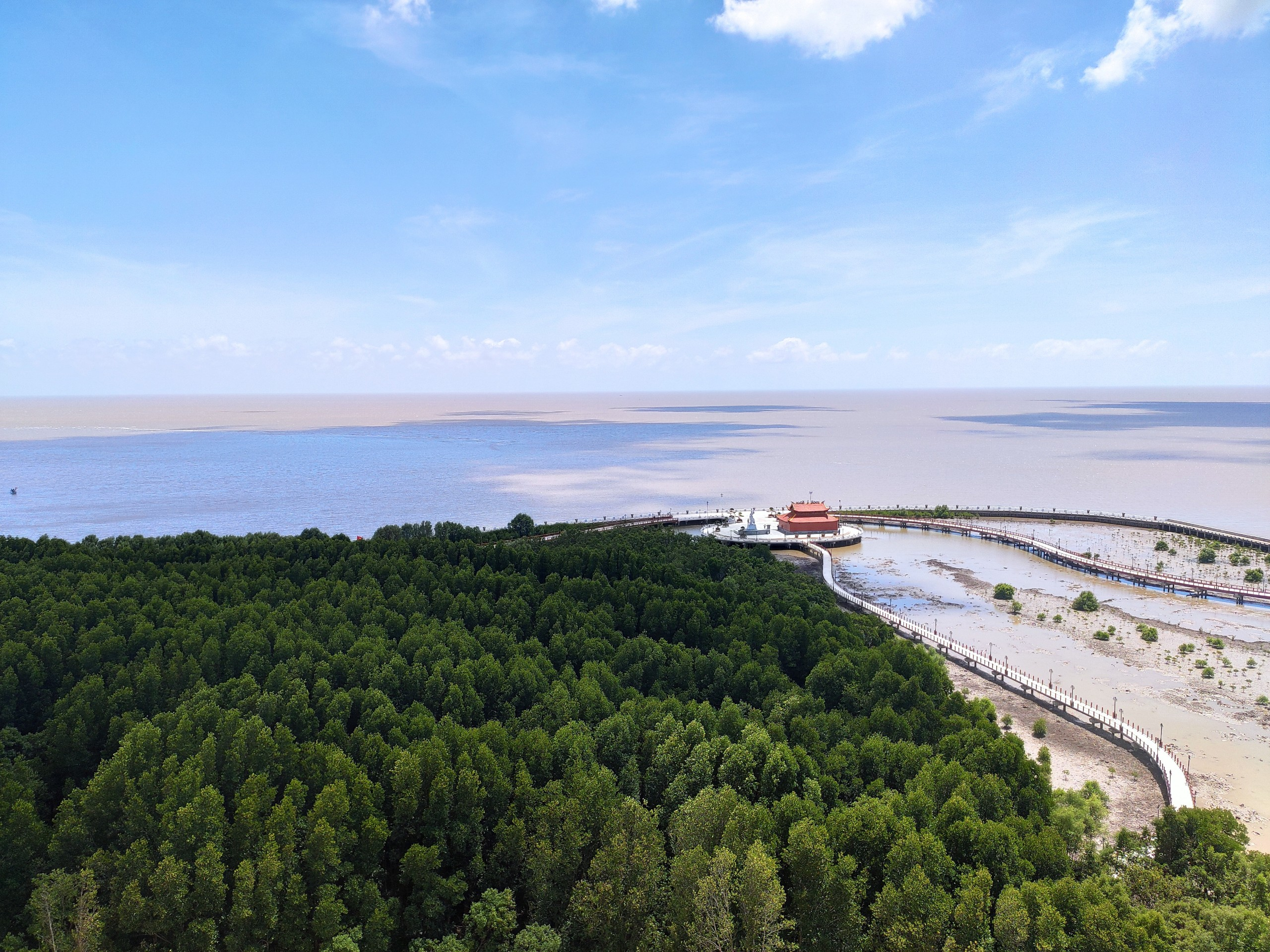

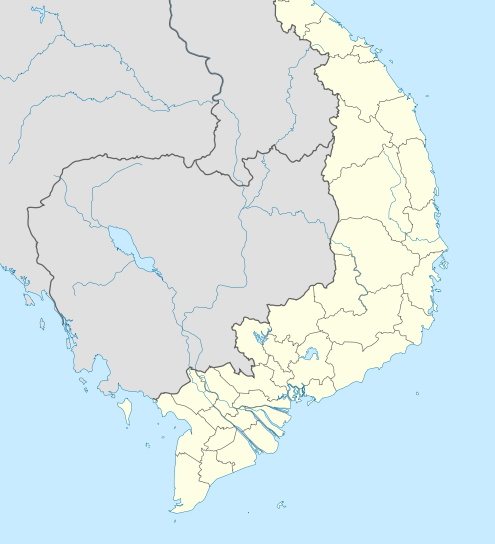
- Coordinates: 8°37′23″N 104°42′36″E
- Location: Đất Mũi, Ngọc Hiển district, Cà Mau province, Vietnam
- Offshore water bodies: South China Sea

Cape Cà Mau (Mũi Cà Mau) is a cape on the Cà Mau Peninsula in Vietnam. It is near the southernmost tip of the Vietnamese mainland.

On 10 July 2012, the embankment was constructed to prevent landslides at Cape Cà Mau.

Cape Cà Mau marks the limit of the Gulf of Thailand.

== Gallery ==
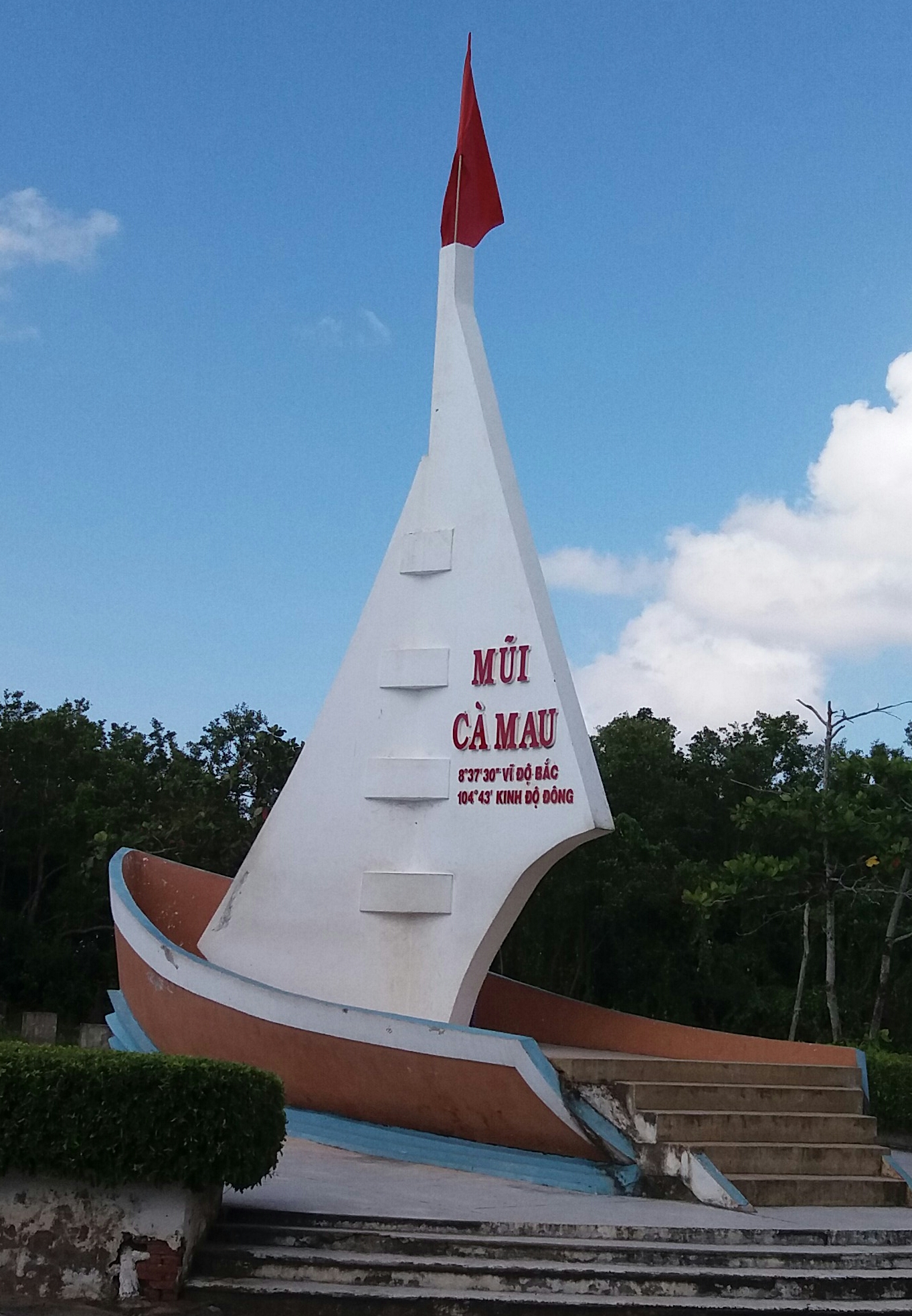
The ship-shaped monument marks the geographical location of Cape Cà Mau

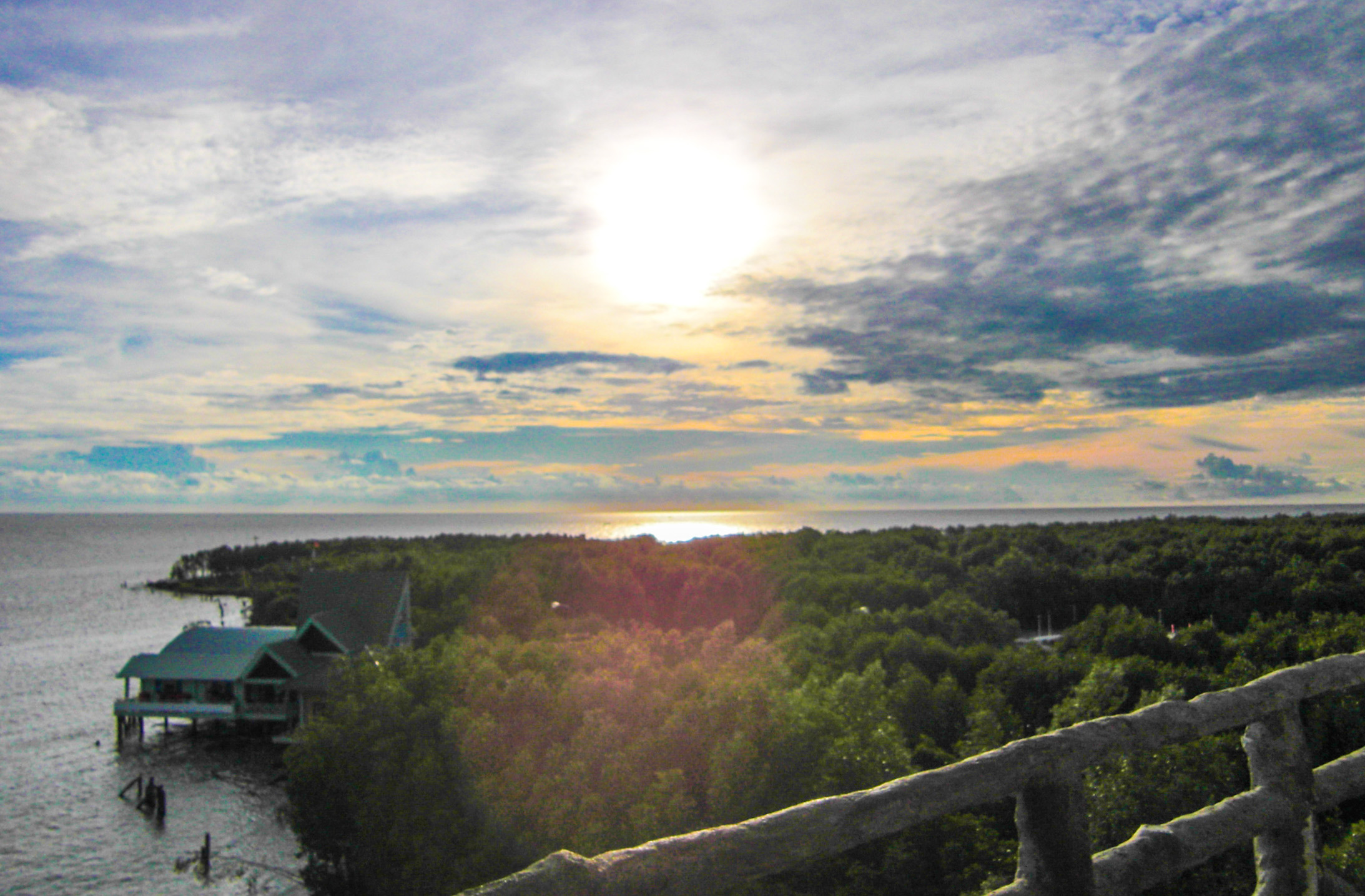
The cape at sunset

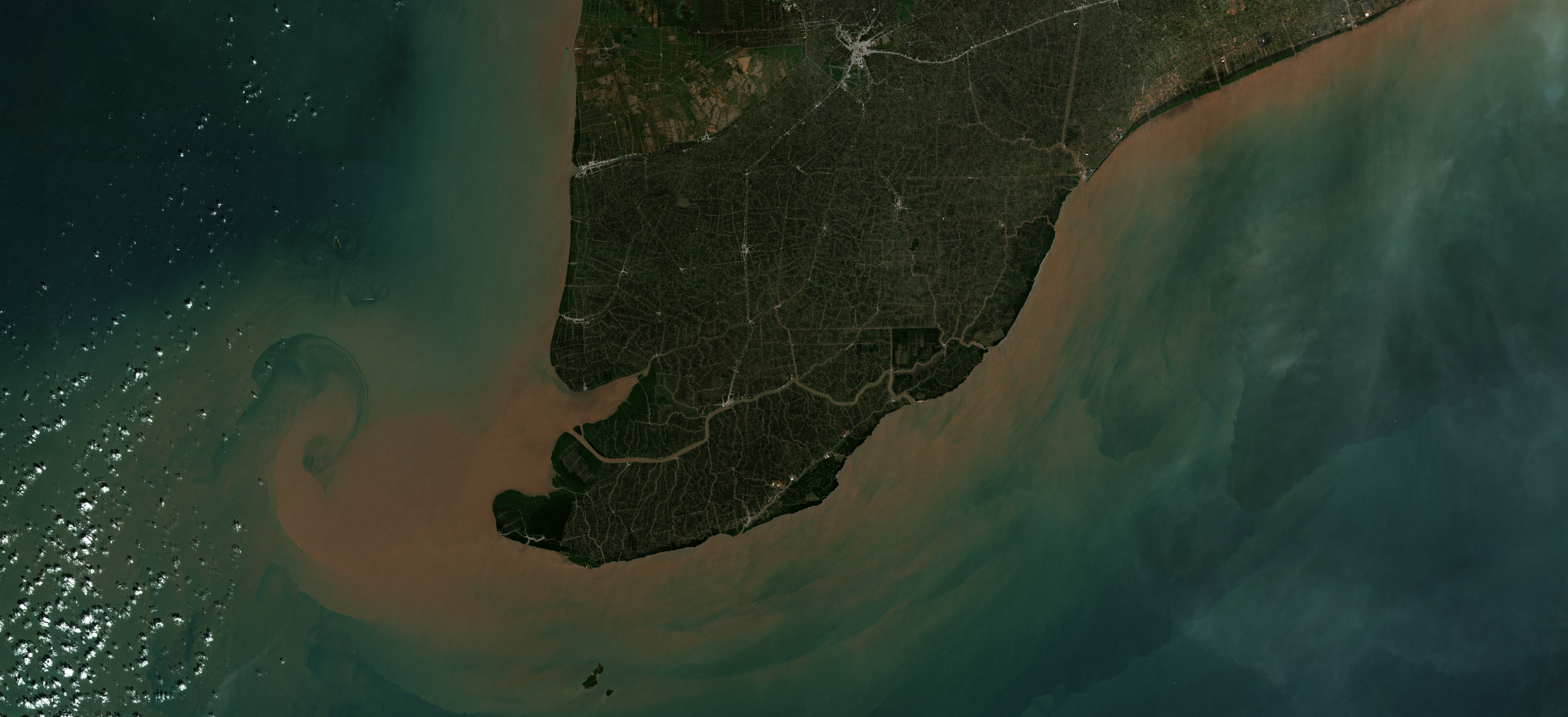
Satellite view

== See also ==
- Cape Ca Mau National Park
