= Mũi Cà Mau National Park =

National park in Vietnam

- IUCN category II (national park)
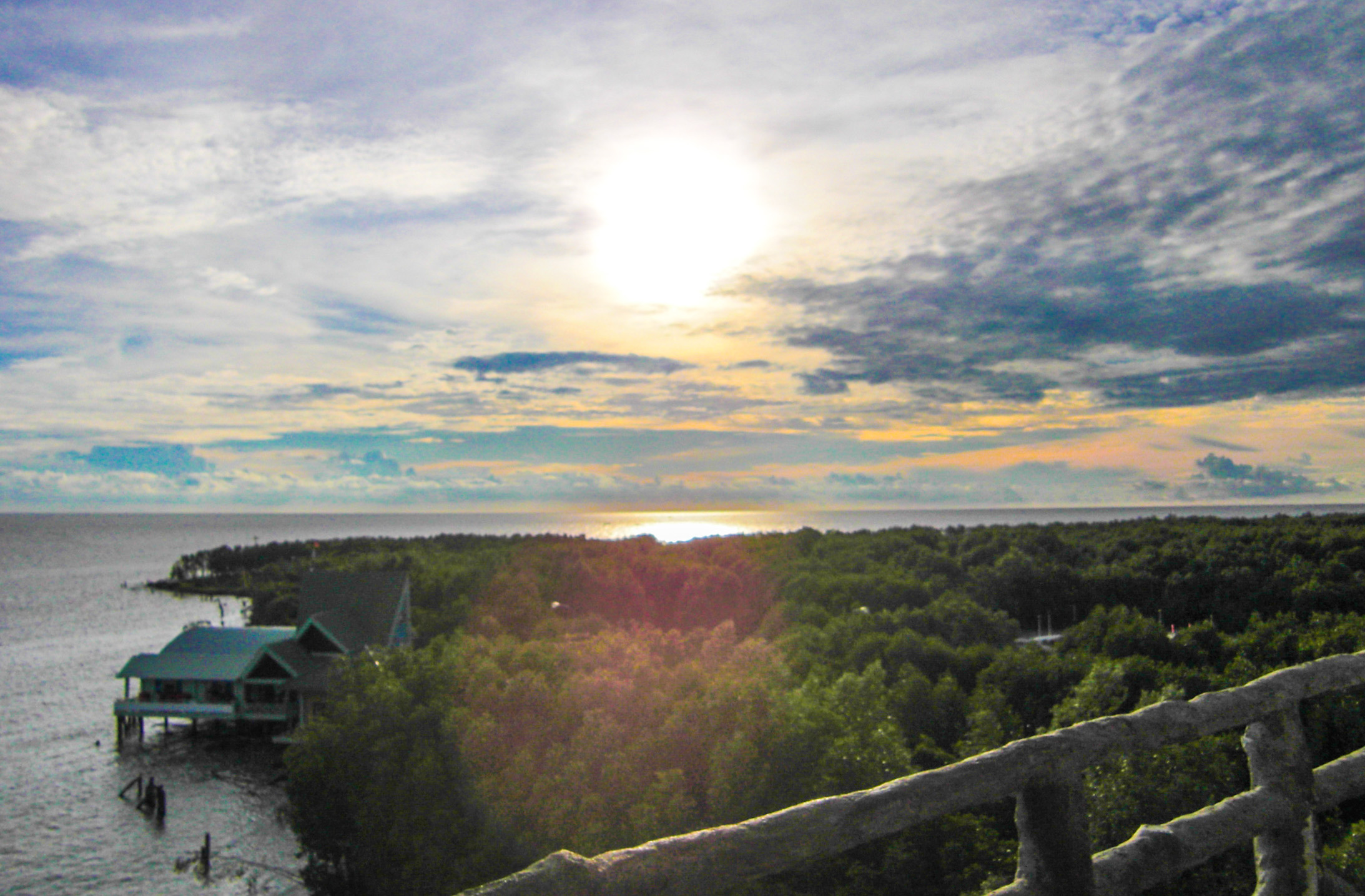
- Mũi Cà Mau National Park

- Location within Vietnam
- Location: South Vietnam
- Nearest city: Cà Mau
- Coordinates: 8°40′30″N 104°47′30″E
- Area: 418.62 km^{2} (161.63 sq mi)
- Established: 2003
- Governing body: People's Committee of Cà Mau province

Ramsar Wetland
- Official name: Mũi Cà Mau National Park
- Designated: 12 December 2013
- Reference no.: 2088

Mũi Cà Mau National Park (Vietnamese: Vườn quốc gia Mũi Cà Mau) or National Park of Cape Cà Mau is a national park in southern Vietnam. It is located in Đất Mũi Commune, Cà Mau Province, the southernmost of Vietnam's provinces.

The park was established by Decision 142/2003/QĐ-TTg of the Prime Minister of Vietnam on July 14, 2003, on the basis of the natural preservation zone of Đất Mũi, a zone founded by Decision 194/CT, dated August 9, 1986.

By 2025, the plan is to replant about 150 hectares of mangroves, as part of a five-year plan to restore the forest. Mangrove trees form an important natural barrier against natural disasters and in some way protect the Mekong Delta.

The national park has great biodiversity. 26 species of mammals, 43 species of reptiles, 9 species of amphibians, 233 species of fish and 93 species of birds live here.

== Location ==
This park is located on the southernmost tip of Vietnam's territory.

Coordinates: from N 8°32' to 8°49' and E 104°40' to 104°55'.

Total area: 41,862 ha, including:

- Inland area: 15,262 ha.
- Coast area: 26,600 ha.

== See also ==
- Cape Cà Mau
