= Đất Mũi =

Coordinates: 8°33′49″N 104°50′27″E

- Commune
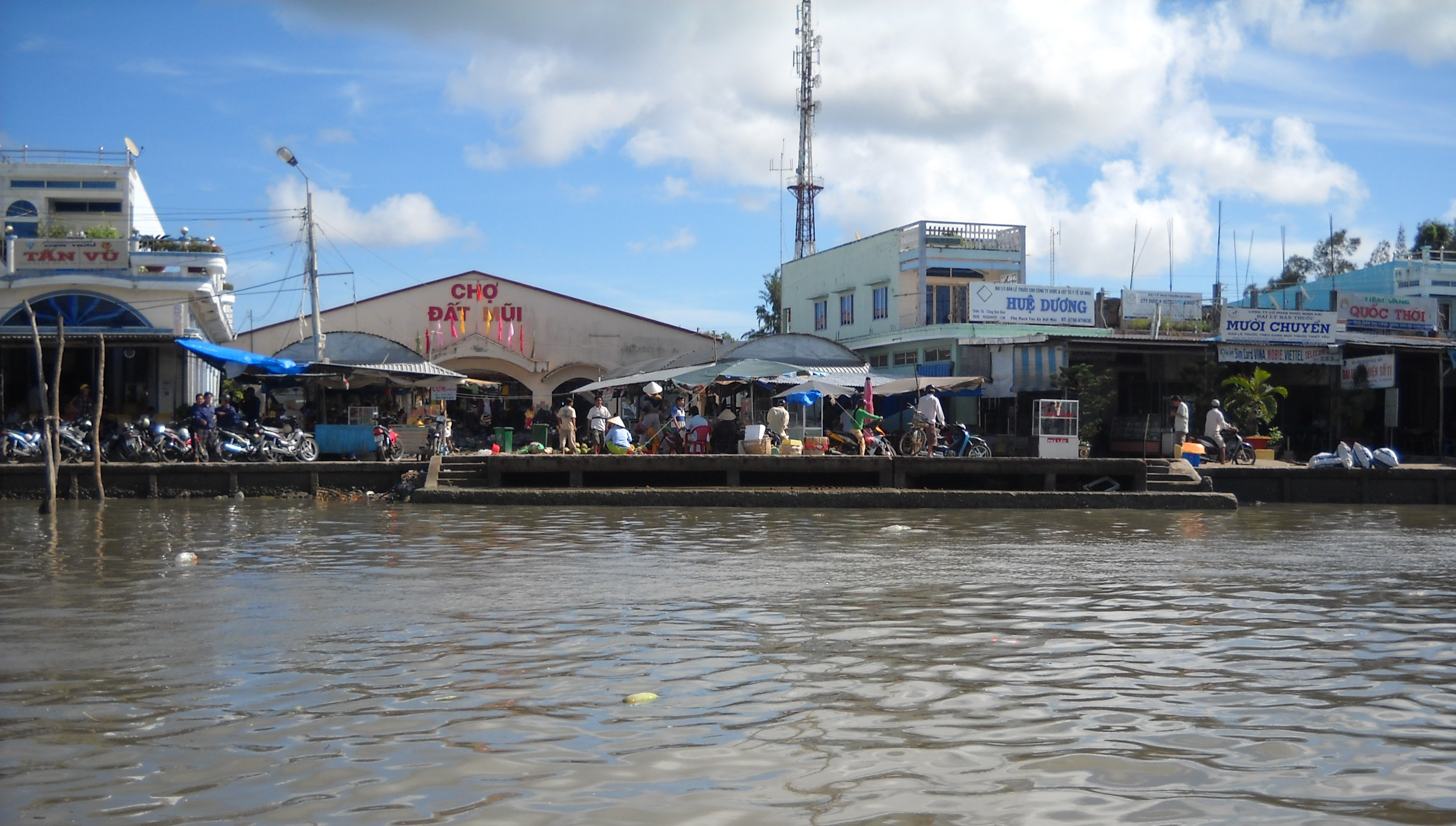
- Đất Mũi Market
- Interactive map of Đất Mũi
- Country: Vietnam
- Province: Cà Mau
- Establishment: June 16, 2025

Area
  - Total: 271.20 km^{2} (104.71 sq mi)

Population (2025)
  - Total: 33.298
  - Density: 0.12278/km^{2} (0.31800/sq mi)
- Time zone: UTC+07:00

Đất Mũi is a commune (xã) and village in Cà Mau province, in Vietnam.

The Standing Committee of the National Assembly issued Resolution No. 1655/NQ-UBTVQH15 on the rearrangement of commune-level administrative units of Cà Mau province in 2025 (the resolution takes effect from 16 June 2025). Accordingly, Đất Mũi commune was established in Cà Mau province on the basis of the entire natural area of 147.20 km² and a population of 18,032 people of Đất Mũi commune; the adjustment of 119.30 km² in natural area with a population of 15,266 people from Viên An commune; and the adjustment of 4.70 km² in natural area with no residents from the Hòn Khoai island cluster of Tân Ân commune, Ngọc Hiển district.

== Geography ==
Đất Mũi is the southernmost commune on the mainland of Vietnam. It is home to the national coordinate marker and Mũi Cà Mau National Park. Its geographical location is as follows:

- To the east, it borders Phan Ngọc Hiển Commune.
- To the south, it borders the South China Sea.
- To the west, it borders the Gulf of Thailand.
- To the north, it borders Đất Mới Commune.

Đất Mũi Commune covers an area of 271.20 km²; as of 2024, it has a population of 33,298 people, resulting in a population density of approximately 123 people/km².

== Administration divisions ==
Dat Mui Commune is divided into 22 hamlets: Ba Khue, Cai Hoang, Cai Moi, Cai Xep, Con Cat, Con Mui, Khai Long, Kinh Dao, Kinh Dao Dong, Kinh Nam, Mui, Nguyen Quyen, Ong Linh, Ong Trang, Rach Tau, Rach Tau Dong, Rach Tho, Sac Co, So Dua, Vinh Nuoc Soi, Xeo Mam, and Xom Bien.

== History ==
On September 20, 1975, the Politburo issued Resolution No. 245-NQ/TW regarding the merger of Bạc Liêu province, Cà Mau province and 2 districts An Biên district and Vĩnh Thuận district (excluding Dong Yen and Tay Yen communes) of Rạch Giá province into a new province. The name of the new province and the location of the provincial capital will be proposed by the local authorities.

On December 20, 1975, the Politburo issued Resolution No. 19/NQ Regarding the merger of Bạc Liêu and Cà Mau provinces into a new province, the name of the new province and the location of the provincial capital will be proposed by the local authorities.

On February 24, 1976, the Provisional Revolutionary Government of the Republic of South Vietnam issued Decree No. 3/NQ/1976 regarding the merger of Bạc Liêu province and Cà Mau province into a new province, named Bạc Liêu – Cà Mau province.

On March 10, 1976, the Government issued a Resolution regarding the establishment of Minh Hải province on the basis of renaming Bạc Liêu – Cà Mau province.

On July 25, 1979, the Government Council issued Decision No. 275-CP on dividing Vien An commune in Ngọc Hiển district into 3 communes: Duyên An Đông (Viên An Đông), Duyên An Tây (Viên An Tây), and Đất Mũi.

On December 17, 1984, the Government Council issued Decision No. 168-HĐBT Regarding:

- Changing the name of Ngọc Hiển district to Ngọc Hiển district.
- Transferring Dat Mui commune from Ngọc Hiển district to the newly renamed Ngọc Hiển district.

On November 6, 1996, the National Assembly issued Resolution on the division of Minh Hải into Bạc Liêu and Cà Mau provinces.

On June 12, 2025, the National Assembly issued Resolution No. 202/2025/QH15 on the arrangement of provincial-level administrative units (Resolution effective from June 12, 2025). Accordingly, the province of Bac Lieu is merged into the province of Ca Mau.

June 16, 2025:

- The National Assembly issued Resolution No. 203/2025/QH15 regarding the amendment and supplementation of several articles of the Constitution of the Socialist Republic of Vietnam. Accordingly, the operation of district-level administrative units nationwide will cease from July 1, 2025.
- The Standing Committee of the National Assembly issued Resolution No. 1655/NQ-UBTVQH15 Regarding the reorganization of commune-level administrative units in Ca Mau province in 2025 (resolution effective from June 16, 2025). Accordingly, Dat Mui commune is established in Ca Mau province based on the entire 147.20 km² of natural area and a population of 18,032 people of Dat Mui commune; adjusting 119.30 km² of natural area and a population of 15,266 people of Vien An commune; and adjusting 4.70 km² of uninhabited natural area of Hon Khoai island cluster belonging to Tan An commune, Ngoc Hien district.

Dat Mui commune has a natural area of 271.20 km² and a population of 33,298 people.

== Tourism ==
Đất Mũi Commune features:

- Đất Mũi Tourist Area
- Khai Long Tourist Area
- GPS Coordinate Marker 0001
- Mũi Cà Mau National Park
- Hon Khoai

== Transportation ==
The road transportation network—specifically the Ho Chi Minh Highway—has been constructed and fully completed up to the commune's administrative center. From the administrative center to the various hamlets, roads with concrete surfaces are in place, though they are not yet suitable for large tourist coaches.

Waterway transportation is highly developed, thanks to an extensive and dense network of canals and creeks.
