= Năm Căn district =

Former district of Cà Mau province, Vietnam

Coordinates: 8°46′08″N 104°59′28″E

Năm Căn
- District
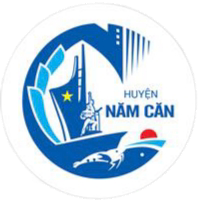
- Seal
- Nickname: "Mine of Black Gold" (Mỏ vàng đen)
- Motto: "Solidarity – Democracy – Responsibility – Development" (Đoàn kết – Dân chủ – Trách nhiệm – Phát triển)
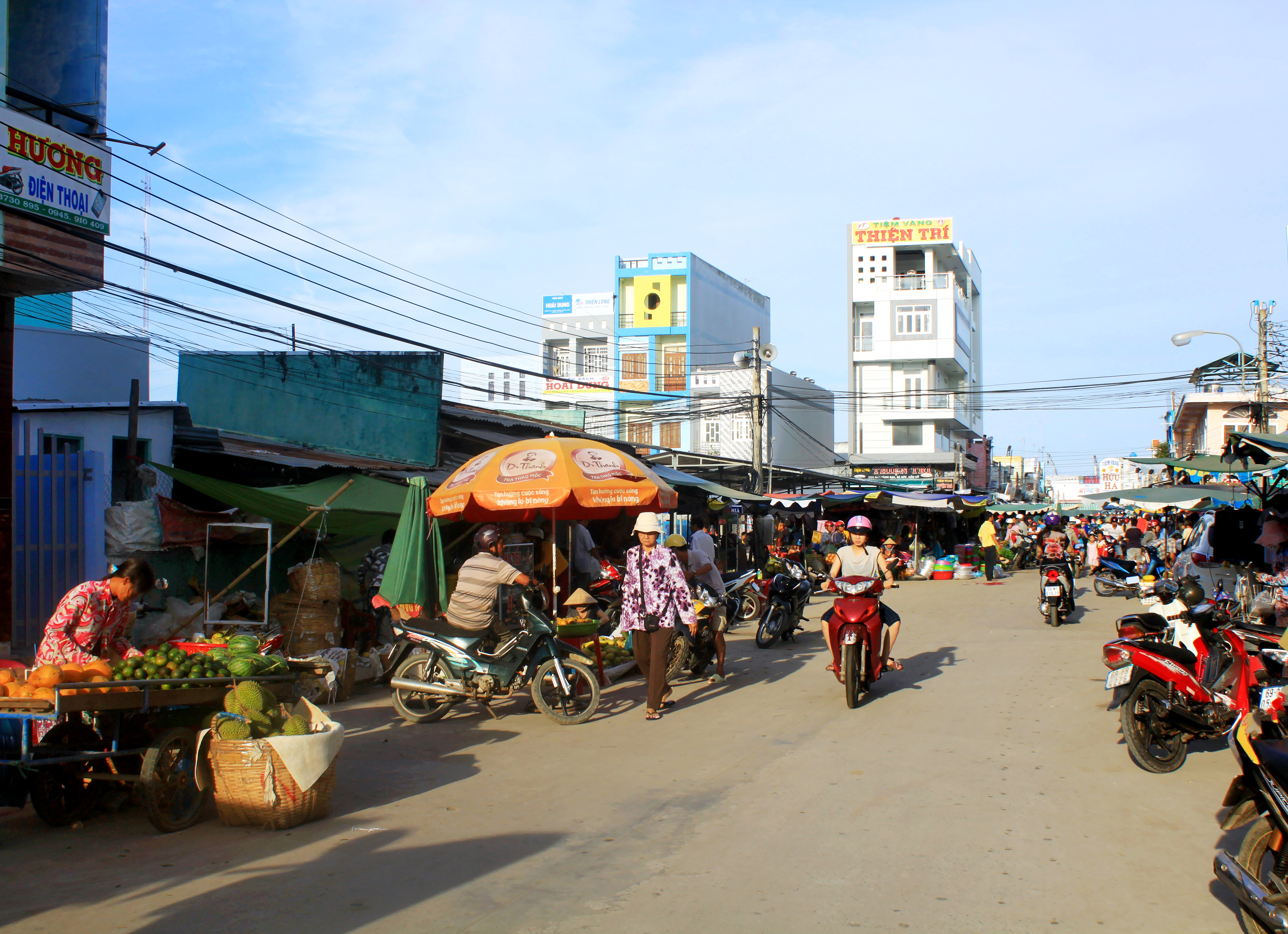
- A part of Năm Căn market.
- Country: Vietnam
- Province: Cà Mau
- Existence: 1836 to August 30, 2025
- Central hall: No.1, Block 1, Phan Ngọc Hiển road, Phạm Quốc Rin ward, Năm Căn township

Government
  - Type: Rural district
  - People Committee's Chairman: Huỳnh Minh Kiên
  - People Council's Chairman: Đoàn Tấn Công
  - Front Committee's Chairman: Tôn Nữ Hương Giang
  - Party Committee's Secretary: Lượng Trọng Quyền

Area
  - Total: 490.85 km^{2} (189.52 sq mi)

Population (December 31, 2022)
  - Total: 87,097
  - Density: 177/km^{2} (460/sq mi)
  - Ethnicities: Kinh (98%); Tanka (1.5%); Khmer (0.5%)
- Time zone: UTC+7 (Indochina Time)
- ZIP code: 98800 (Note: An official code from December 31, 2022, to August 30, 2025.)
- Website: Namcan.Camau.gov.vn; Namcan.Camau.dcs.vn

Năm Căn [nam˧˧:kaŋ˧˧] is a former district of Cà Mau province in the Mekong Delta region of Vietnam.

== Geography ==
As of 2019 the district had a population of 56,813. The district covers an area of 533 km^{2}. The district capital lies at Năm Căn.

The district is divided into the following communes:

- Năm Căn (capital-township)
- Hàm Rồng
- Đất Mới
- Hàng Vịnh
- Hiệp Tùng
- Tam Giang
- Tam Giang Đông
- Lâm Hải

== See also ==
- Cái Nước district
- Đầm Dơi district
- Đông Hải district
