= Phan Ngọc Hiển =

- Commune
- Location in Vietnam
- Coordinates: 8°36′18″N 104°55′47″E
- Country: Vietnam
- Province: Cà Mau

Population (2004)
  - Total: 7,831
- Time zone: UTC+07:00 (Indochina Time)

Phan Ngọc Hiển is a commune of Cà Mau province, Vietnam.

The Standing Committee of the National Assembly issued Resolution No. 1655/NQ-UBTVQH15 on the rearrangement of commune-level administrative units of Cà Mau province in 2025 (the resolution takes effect from 16 June 2025). Accordingly, Phan Ngọc Hiển commune was established in Cà Mau province on the basis of the entire natural area of 45.80 km² and a population of 13,930 people of Rạch Gốc Township; the entire natural area of 134.20 km² and a population of 14,808 people of Viên An Đông commune; and the adjustment of 62.40 km² in natural area with a population of 6,590 people from Tân Ân commune, all belonging to Ngọc Hiển district.
