= Tân Ân =

- Commune and village
- Country: Vietnam
- Province: Cà Mau
- Time zone: UTC+07:00

Tân Ân is a commune (xã) and village in Cà Mau province, in Vietnam.

The Standing Committee of the National Assembly issued Resolution No. 1655/NQ-UBTVQH15 on the rearrangement of commune-level administrative units of Cà Mau province in 2025 (the resolution takes effect from 16 June 2025). Accordingly, Tân Ân commune was established in Cà Mau province on the basis of the entire natural area of 111.80 km² and a population of 13,179 people of Tam Giang Tây commune, and the entire natural area of 106.50 km² and a population of 10,608 people of Tân Ân Tây commune, both belonging to Ngọc Hiển district.
