= Citadel of Đồng Hới =

Citadel in the center Đồng Hới city

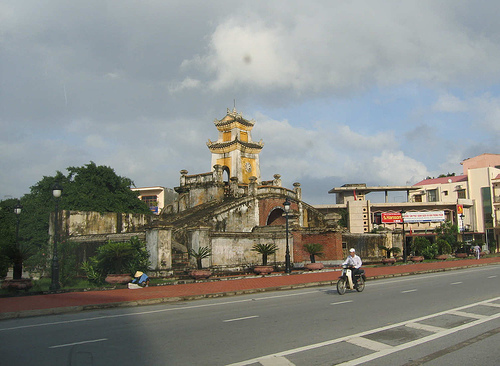
Quảng Bình Gate, the newly restored entry gate of the Đồng Hới Citadel

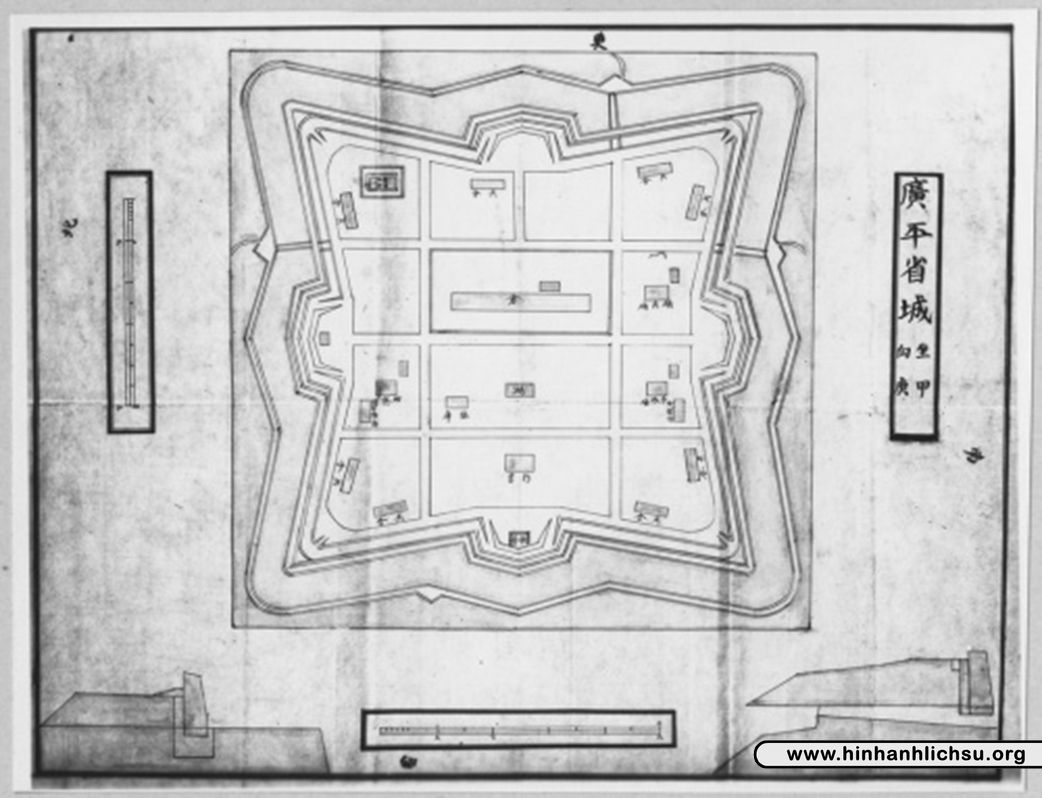
Drawing of Đồng Hới citadel in the Nguyễn dynasty

Đồng Hới Citadel (Vietnamese: Thành Đồng Hới) is a citadel in the center Đồng Hới city, capital of Quảng Bình Province. This citadel is located in the vicinity of now Hùng Vương Street, Đồng Hới. Today all that remains of the citadel is one rather unsympathetically restored Quảng Bình Gate (located close to the new museum) and a section of the original wall next to Highway 1. In August 2005 Quảng Bình People's Committee announced the start of a VNĐ 31 billion restoration of this site. This is one of principal cultural sites planned to be restored by the government of Vietnam in 2001-2010.
