= Ngọc Hiển district =

Coordinates: 8.667°N 105.000°E

Ngọc Hiển district Huyện Ngọc Hiển
- District
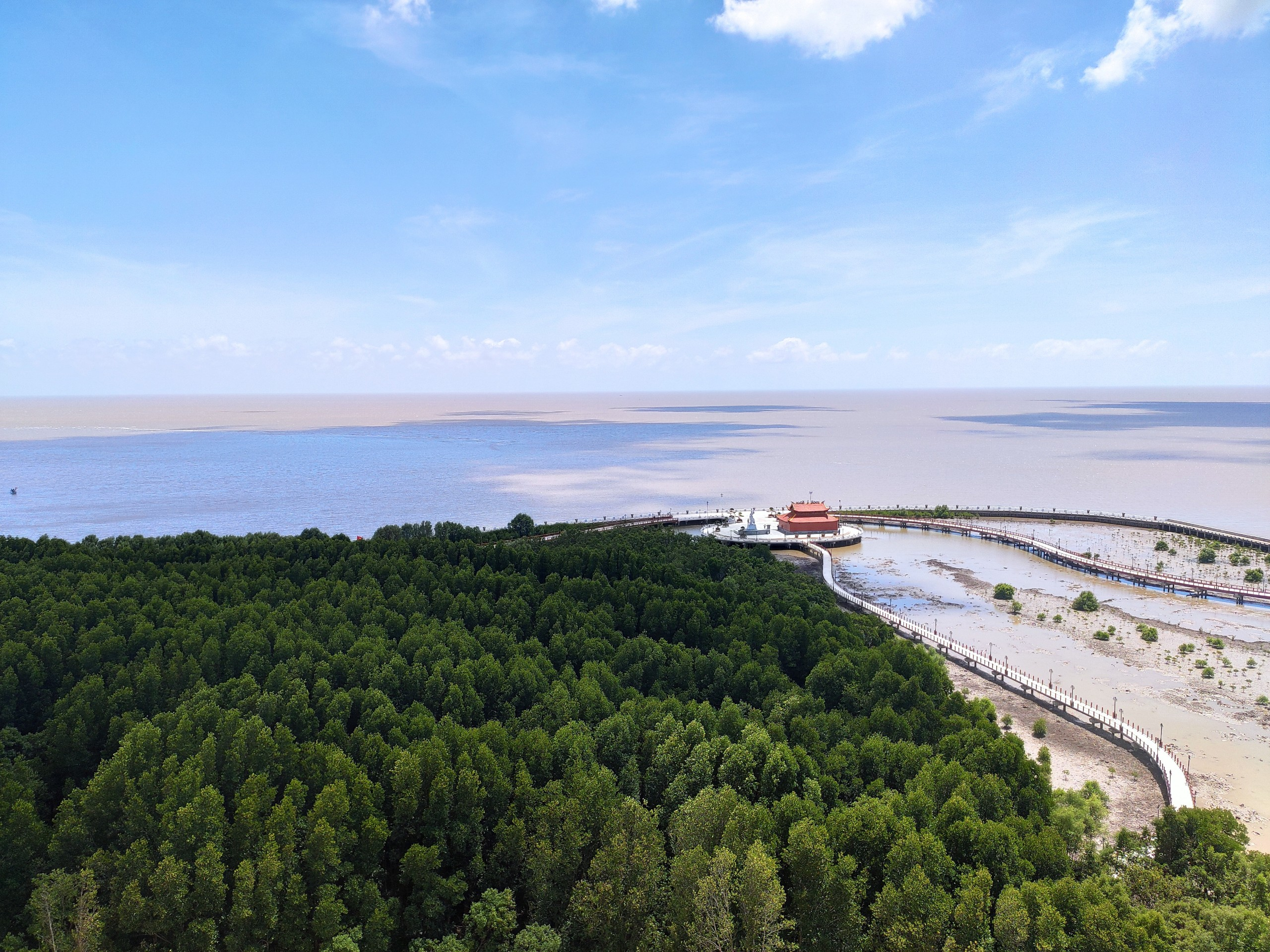
- Cape Cà Mau

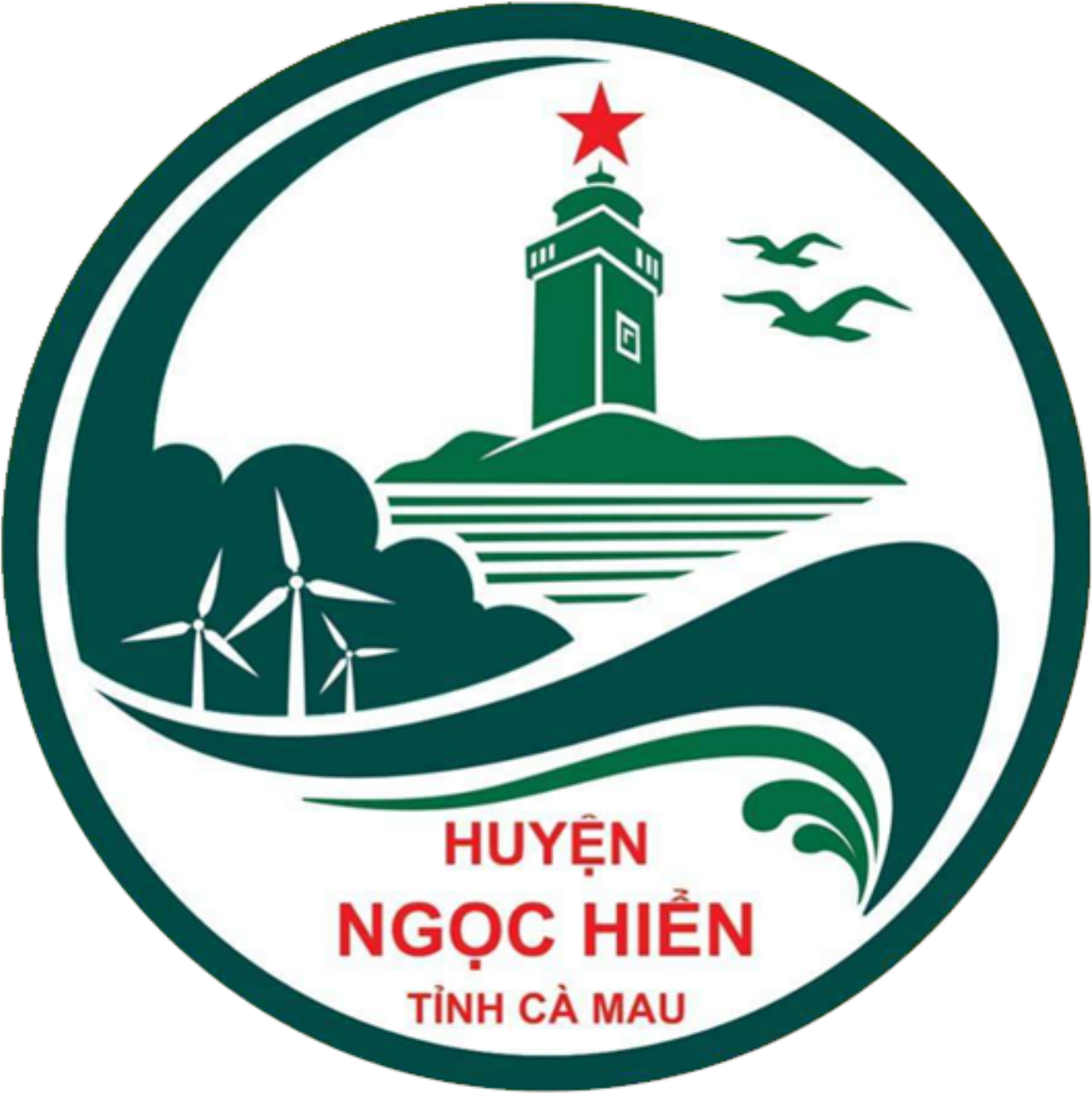
- Seal

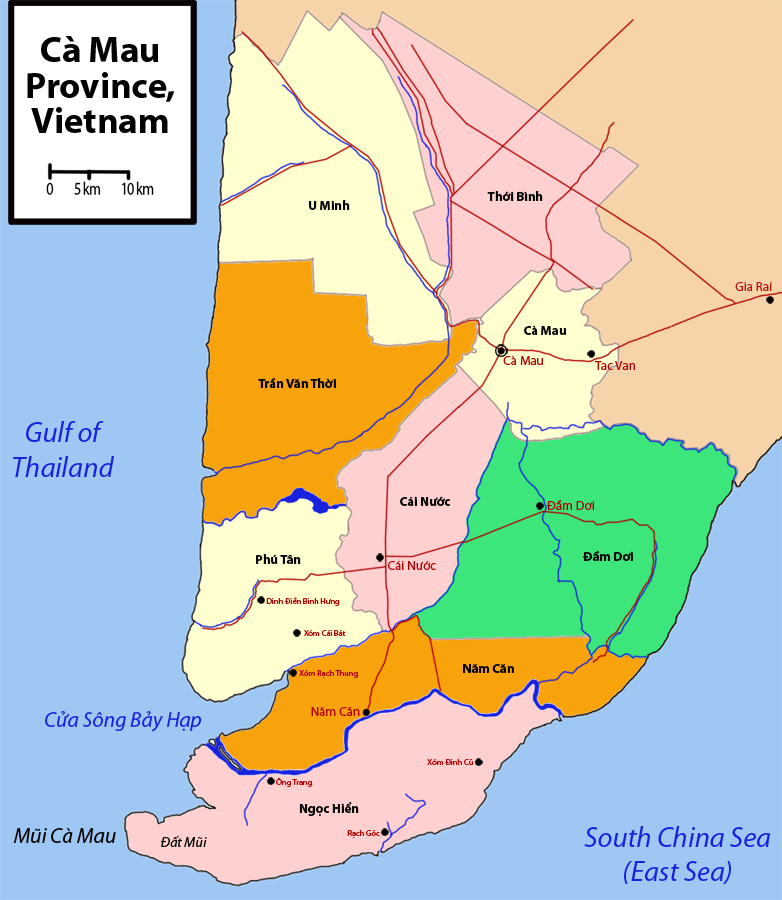
- Districts of Cà Mau province
- Country: Vietnam
- Province: Cà Mau
- Founded: 1984: renamed from Năm Căn district
- Capital: Viên An Đông

Area
  - District: 287 sq mi (743 km^{2})

Population (2019 census)
  - District: 66,874
  - Density: 233/sq mi (90.0/km^{2})
  - Urban: 11,498
  - Rural: 55,376
- Time zone: UTC+07:00 (Indochina Time)
- Website: ngochien.camau.gov.vn

Ngọc Hiển was the southernmost rural district of Cà Mau province before being abolished in the Mekong Delta region of Vietnam. As of 2003, the district had a population of 66,874. The district covers an area of 743 km^{2}. The district capital lies at Viên An Đông.

== Divisions ==
Before 2025, the district is divided into the following communes:

- Rạch Gốc (urban municipality)
- Đất Mũi
- Tam Giang Tây
- Tân Ân
- Tân Ân Tây
- Viên An
- Viên An Đông

In 2025, the area was rearranged into 3 communes: Phan Ngọc Hiển, Tân Ân, Đất Mũi.
