= Đất Mới =

Coordinates: 10°14′N 105°26′E

- Commune and village
- Interactive map of Đất Mới
- Country: Vietnam
- Province: Cà Mau
- Time zone: UTC+07:00

Đất Mới is a commune (xã) and village in Cà Mau province, in Vietnam.

The Standing Committee of the National Assembly issued Resolution No. 1655/NQ-UBTVQH15 on the rearrangement of commune-level administrative units of Cà Mau Province in 2025 (the resolution takes effect from 16 June 2025). Accordingly, Đất Mới Commune was established in Cà Mau Province on the basis of the entire natural area of 68.10 km² and a population of 9,181 people of Đất Mới Commune; the entire natural area of 123.50 km² and a population of 9,500 people of Lâm Hải Commune; the adjustment of 18.72 km² in natural area with a population of 8,272 people from Năm Căn Township; the adjustment of 5.12 km² in natural area with a population of 730 people from Hàm Rồng Commune of Năm Căn District; and the adjustment of 7.50 km² in natural area with no permanent residents from Viên An Commune of Ngọc Hiển District.
