= Tourism in Vietnam =

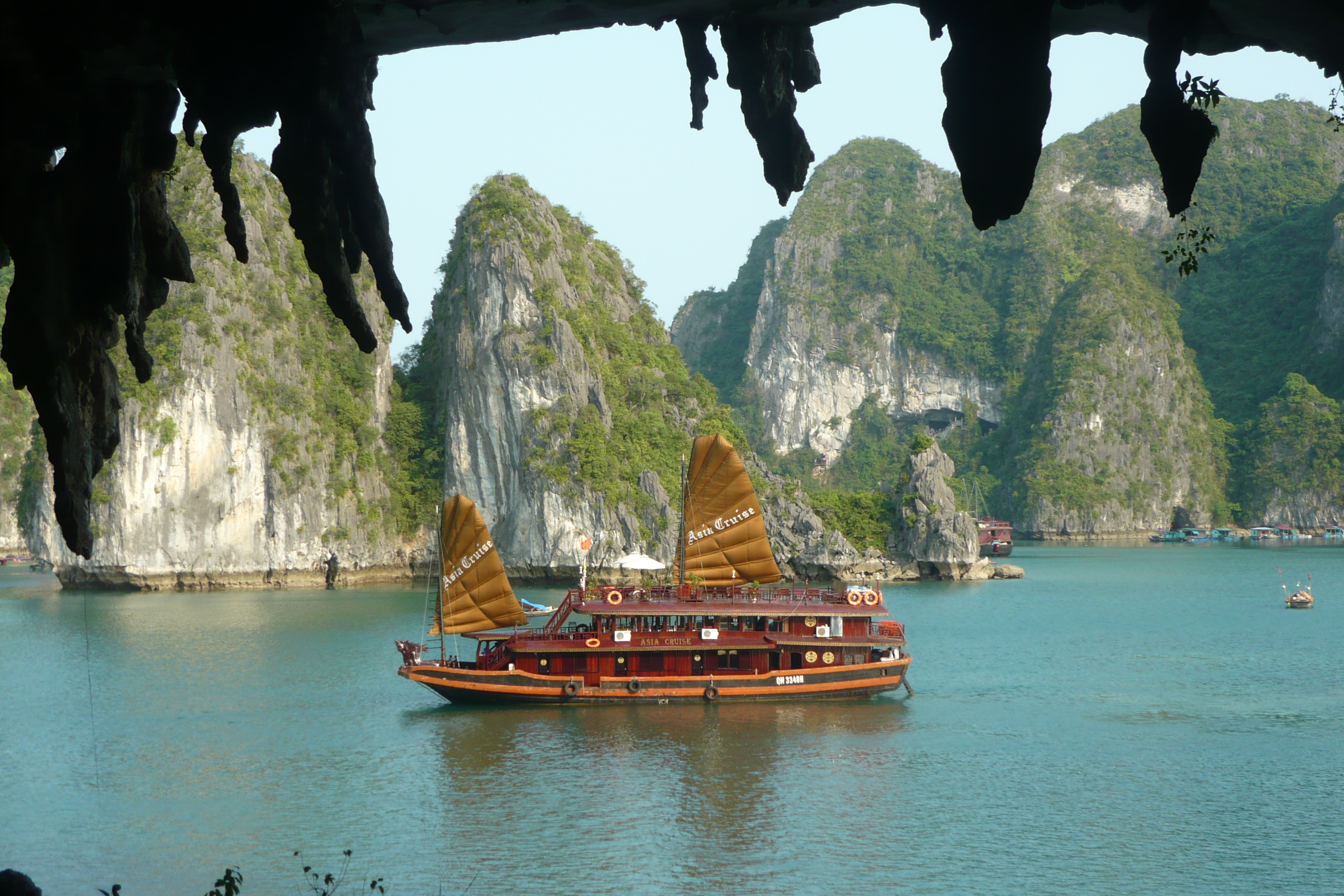
Hạ Long Bay

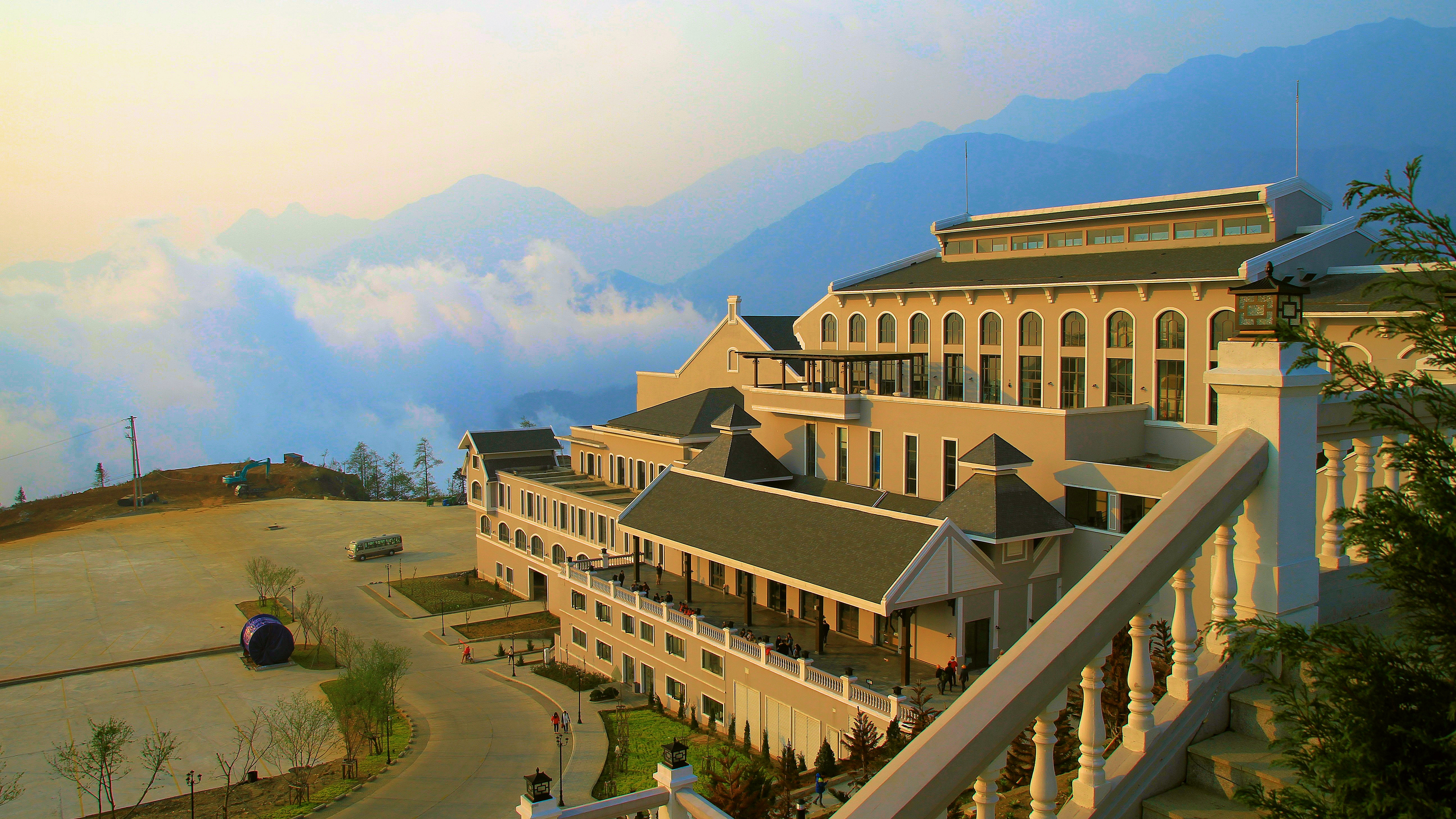
A cable car station located in Sapa, Fansipan: the highest mountain in the Indochinese Peninsula

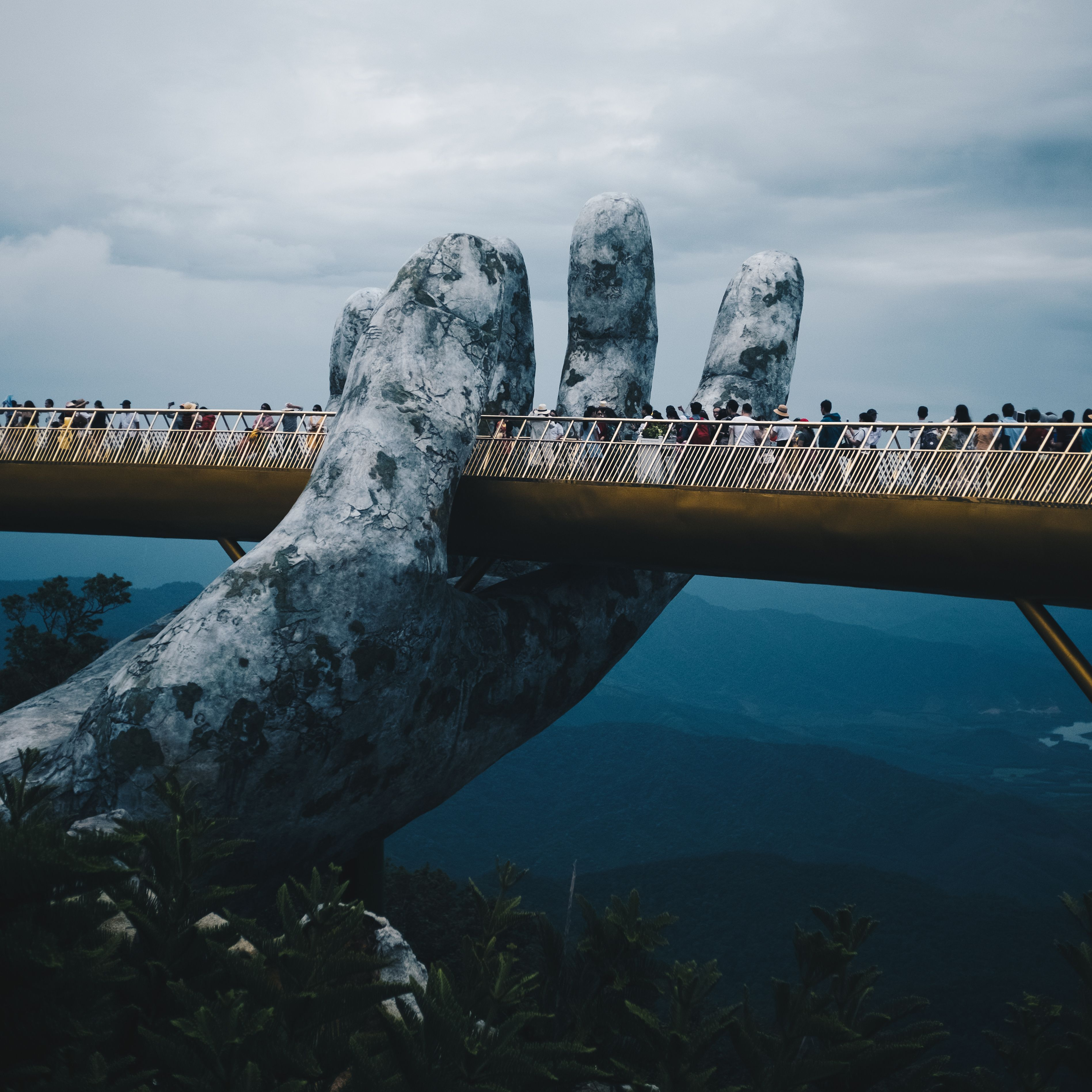
The Golden Bridge at Bana Hills

Tourism in Vietnam is a component of the modern Vietnamese economy. In 2019, Vietnam received 18 million international arrivals, up from 2.1 million in the year 2000. The Vietnam National Administration of Tourism is following a long-term plan to diversify the tourism industry, which brings foreign exchange into the country.

Tourist arrivals in Vietnam have continued to rise in recent years. In 2008, Vietnam received 4.218 million international tourists, in 2009 the number was 3.8 million, down 11%. In 2012, Vietnam received 6.84 million tourists. This was a 13% increase from 2011 figure of 6 million international visitors, which was itself a rise of 2 million visitors relative to 2010 arrivals. In 2016, Vietnam welcomed 10 million international visitors which represented a 26% increase from the previous year.

In 2019, Vietnam with 18 million international visitors was the fifth most visited country in the Asia-Pacific region as per the World Tourism rankings released by the United Nations World Tourism Organization. The Vietnamese tourist industry was severely impacted by the COVID-19 pandemic, with visitor numbers reduced to 3.84 million in 2020, comparable to 2009 numbers. Visitors have steadily increased after the pandemic, reaching 21.2 million in 2025.

== Tourism in the economy ==
Tourism is important in Vietnam. For backpackers, culture and nature lovers, beach-lovers, military soldiers and veterans, Vietnam has become a new tourist destination in Southeast Asia. Local and international tour operators offer tours to ethnic minority groups, walking and bicycle tours, photography tours, kayak trips and multi-country trips in particular with neighboring Cambodia, Laos and Thailand. Foreign tourists have been able to travel freely in the country since 1997.

The economy of Vietnam has transformed from an agrarian to a service economy. More than a third of gross domestic product is generated by services, which include the hotel and catering industry and transportation. The manufacturing and construction (28 percent), agriculture and fisheries (20 percent) and mining (10 percent) have much smaller shares.

Tourism contributes 4.5 percent to gross domestic product (as of 2007). After heavy industry and urban development, most foreign investment in Vietnam has been concentrated in tourism, especially in hotel projects.

According to usual report of World Tourism and Travel Council, tourism contributed 6.6 percent to GDP equal VND 279,287 billion (03/2016) which has important contribution promoting development of related sectors such as transportation, entertainment, cuisine etc.

== Tourism statistics ==
=== International visitors ===
Yearly tourist arrivals in millions

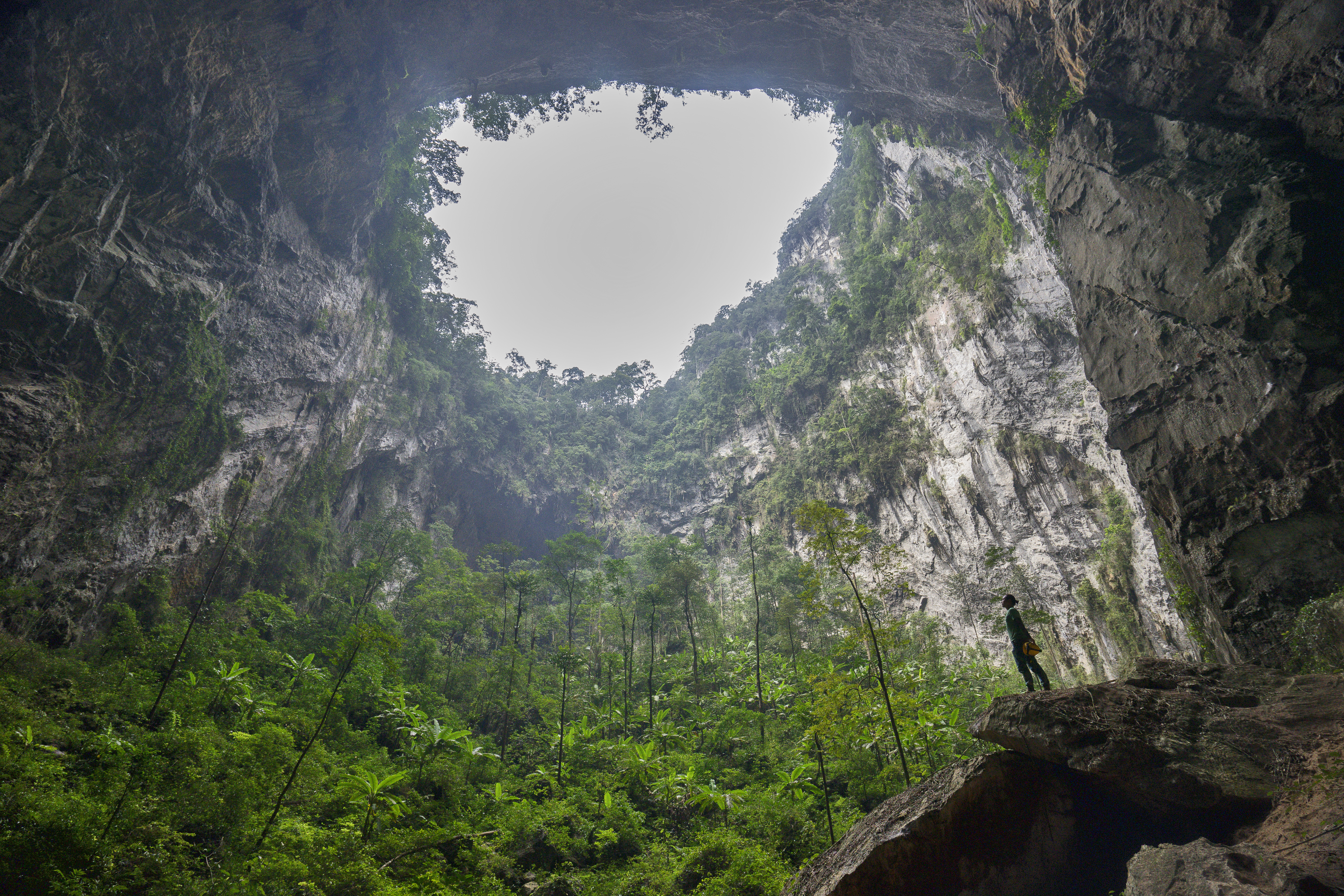
The Hang Sơn Đoòng is the largest known cave passage in the world by volume. It is so large it contains its own subterranean forest and ecosystem.

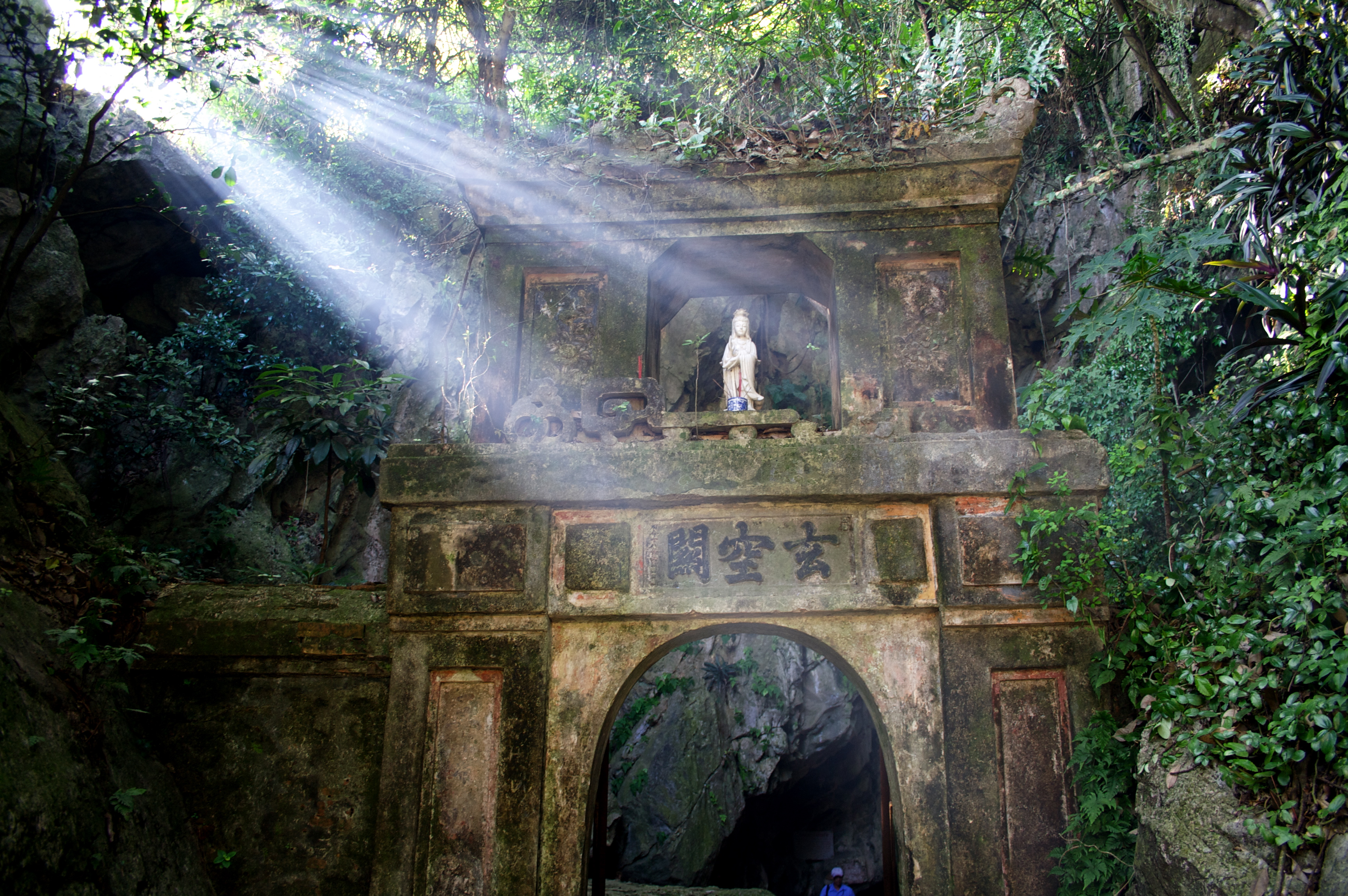
The Gate leading to the Marble Mountains, a popular tourist destination

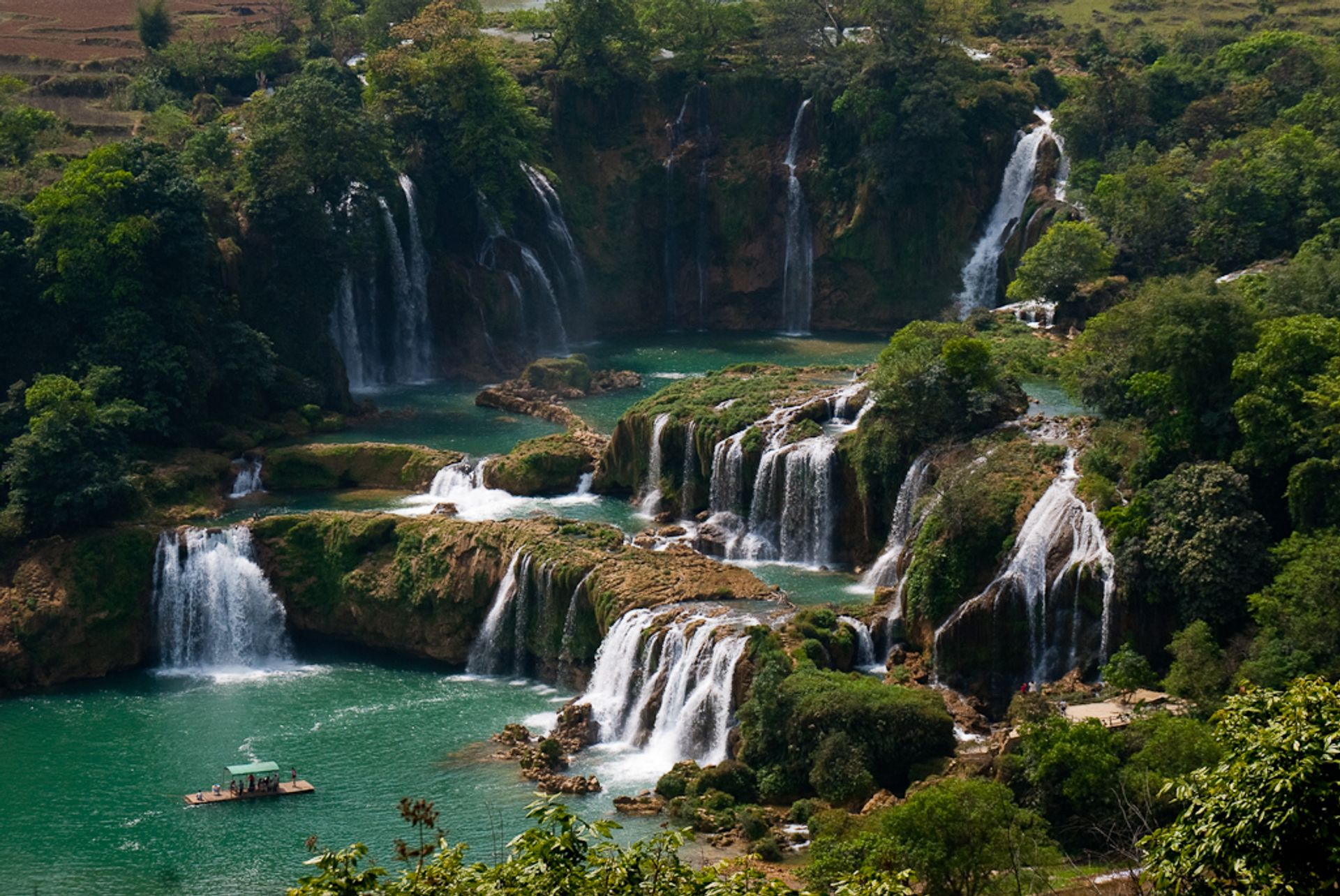
Ban Gioc Falls Giant Waterfalls located in Northern Vietnam

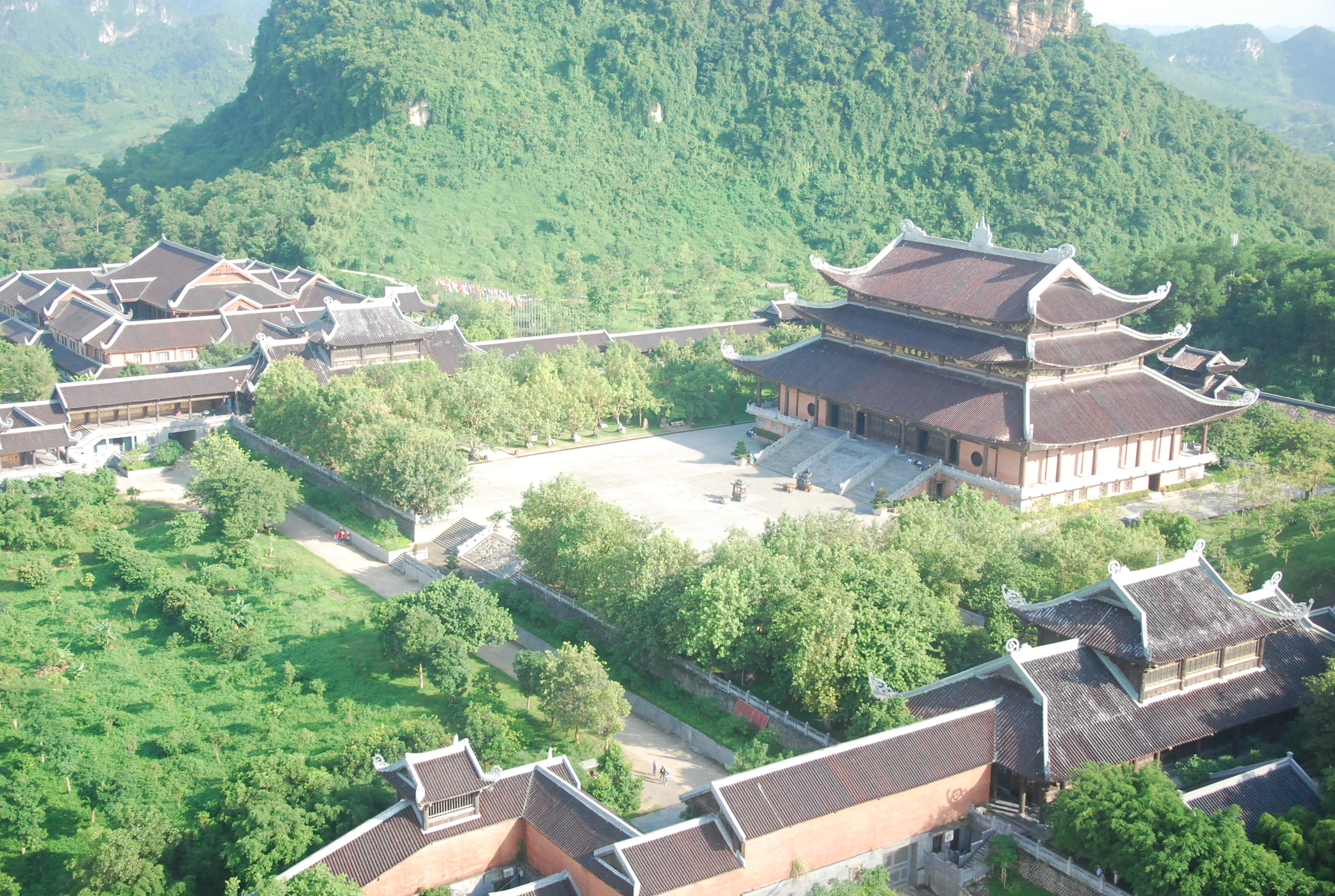
Bái Đính Temple, a popular site for Buddhist pilgrimages from across Vietnam

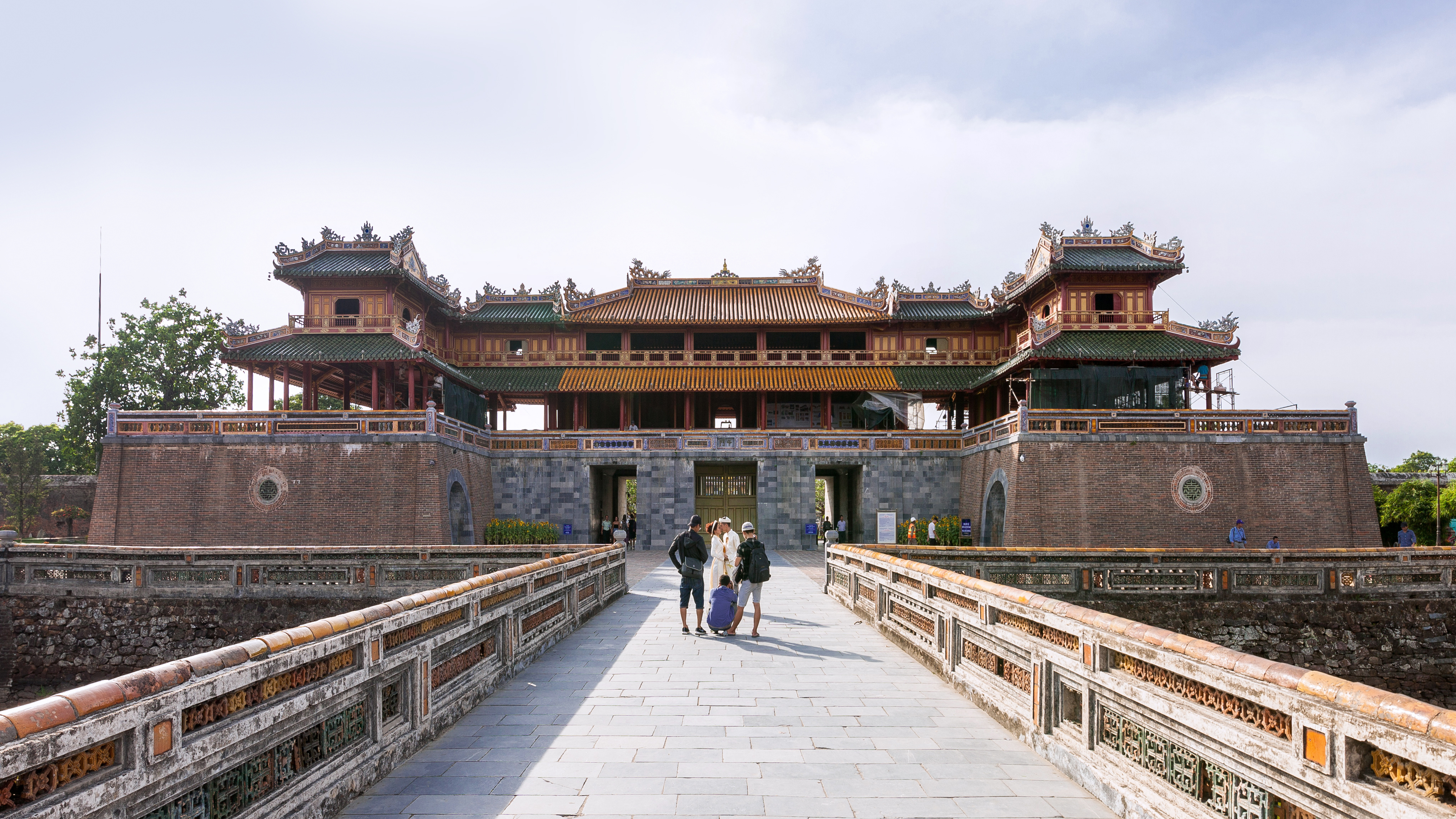
Imperial City, Huế, the former imperial capital of Vietnam

Data source: Ministry of Culture, Sport & Tourism

Year	Tourist Arrivals	Change
10/2026	19,535,396	13,8%
2025	21,168,291	20.4%
2024	17,583,901	39.5%
2023	12,602,434	44.2%
2022	3,440,019	98.2%
2021	3,500	−99%
2020	3,686,779	−78%
2019	18,008,591	16.2%
2018	15,497,791	19.9%
2017	12,922,151	29.1%
2016	10,012,735	26%
2015	7,943,651	0.9%
2014	7,874,312	4%
2013	7,572,352	10.60%
2012	6,847,678	10.8%
2011	6,014,032	19.1%
2010	5,049,855	34.8%
2009	3,772,359	−10.9%
2008	4,253,740	0.6%
2007	4,171,564	16%
2006	3,583,486	3%
2005	3,467,757	18.4%
2004	2,927,876	20.5%
2003	2,429,600	−7.6%
2002	2,628,200	12.8%
2001	2,330,800	8.9%
2000	2,140,100	20.0%
1999	1,781,800	17.2%
1998	1,520,100	−11.4%
1997	1,715,600	6.7%
1996	1,607,200	18.9%
1995	1,351,300	

=== Top countries ===
Data Source: Ministry of Culture, Sport & Tourism

Country	10/2026	2025	2024	2023	2022	3/2020	2019	2018	2017	2016
China	4,385,978	5,282,002	3,738,126	1,743,204	71,862	871,819	6,806,425	4,966,468	4,008,253	2,696,848
South Korea	3,370,543	4,331,411	4,568,941	3,595,062	769,167	819,089	4,290,802	3,485,406	2,415,245	1,543,883
Taiwan	1,073,946	1,231,510	1,288,861	851,024	89,463	192,216	926,744	714,112	616,232	507,301
United States	808,663	848,727	779,795	717,073	215,274	172,706	746,171	687,226	614,117	552,644
Japan	757,468	814,169	711,464	589,522	128,764	200,346	951,962	826,674	798,119	740,592
India	744,567	746,480	501,427	145,340	N/A	N/A	N/A	N/A	N/A	N/A
Russia	1,254,174	689,714	232,300	125,610	28,056	244,966	646,524	606,637	574,164	433,987
Cambodia*	787,120	687,132	474,580	402,062	140,461	120,430	227,910	202,954	222,614	211,949
Malaysia*	533,440	573,716	495,383	470,105	135,007	116,221	606,206	540,119	480,456	407,574
Australia	542,970	548,471	490,880	390,087	99,156	92,227	383,511	386,934	370,438	320,678
Philippines*	579,199	482,173	265,947	153,168	36,281	36,969	179,190	151,641	133,543	110,967
Thailand*	401,451	457,775	418,054	489,174	162,567	125,725	509,802	349,310	301,587	266,984
Singapore*	387,575	401,420	347,495	328,195	128,399	51,726	308,969	286,246	277,658	257,041
United Kingdom	323,675	368,318	306,194	253,522	67,337	81,433	315,084	298,114	283,537	254,841
France	300,135	337,729	278,943	215,508	58,107	74,480	287,655	279,659	255,369	240,808
Germany	261,731	291,039	249,517	200,425	59,975	61,465	226,792	213,986	199,872	176,015
Indonesia*	216,502	207,196	184,093	105,380	26,338	21,446	106,688	87,941	81,065	69,653
Laos*	162,643	179,340	148,655	120,522	47,002	36,810	98,492	120,009	141,588	137,004
Canada	162,860	173,391	152,527	133,493	37,894	41,807	159,121	149,535	138,242	122,929
Italy	90,210	107,358	88,912	57,054	15,051	17,774	70,798	65,562	58,041	51,265
Spain	75,128	97,442	91,370	76,087	22,511	11,783	83,597	77,071	69,528	57,957
Netherlands	86,258	91,709	78,043	68,057	19,756	18,265	81,092	77,300	72,277	64,712
Poland	72,223	72,928	51,157	N/A	N/A	N/A	N/A	N/A	N/A	N/A
New Zealand	58,150	57,128	47,963	33,730	8,681	9,470	47,088	49,854	49,115	42,588
Denmark	39,443	41,410	36,920	30,231	8,250	14,444	42,043	39,926	34,720	30,996
Switzerland	37,519	39,875	33,584	27,929	8,025	10,845	36,577	34,541	33,123	31,475
Sweden	35,420	39,499	34,267	25,755	6,487	21,857	50,704	49,723	44,045	37,679
Belgium	34,351	37,566	31,730	26,353	8,104	7,452	34,187	31,382	29,144	26,231
Norway	31,027	33,264	27,936	22,717	5,235	8,958	28,037	26,134	24,293	23,110
Czech Republic	25,538	N/A	N/A	N/A	N/A	N/A	N/A	N/A	N/A	N/A
Total	19,535,396	21,168,291	17,583,901	12,602,434	3,661,222	3,686,779	18,008,591	15,497,791	12,922,151	10,012,735

* Country in ASEAN

== Destinations and attractions ==
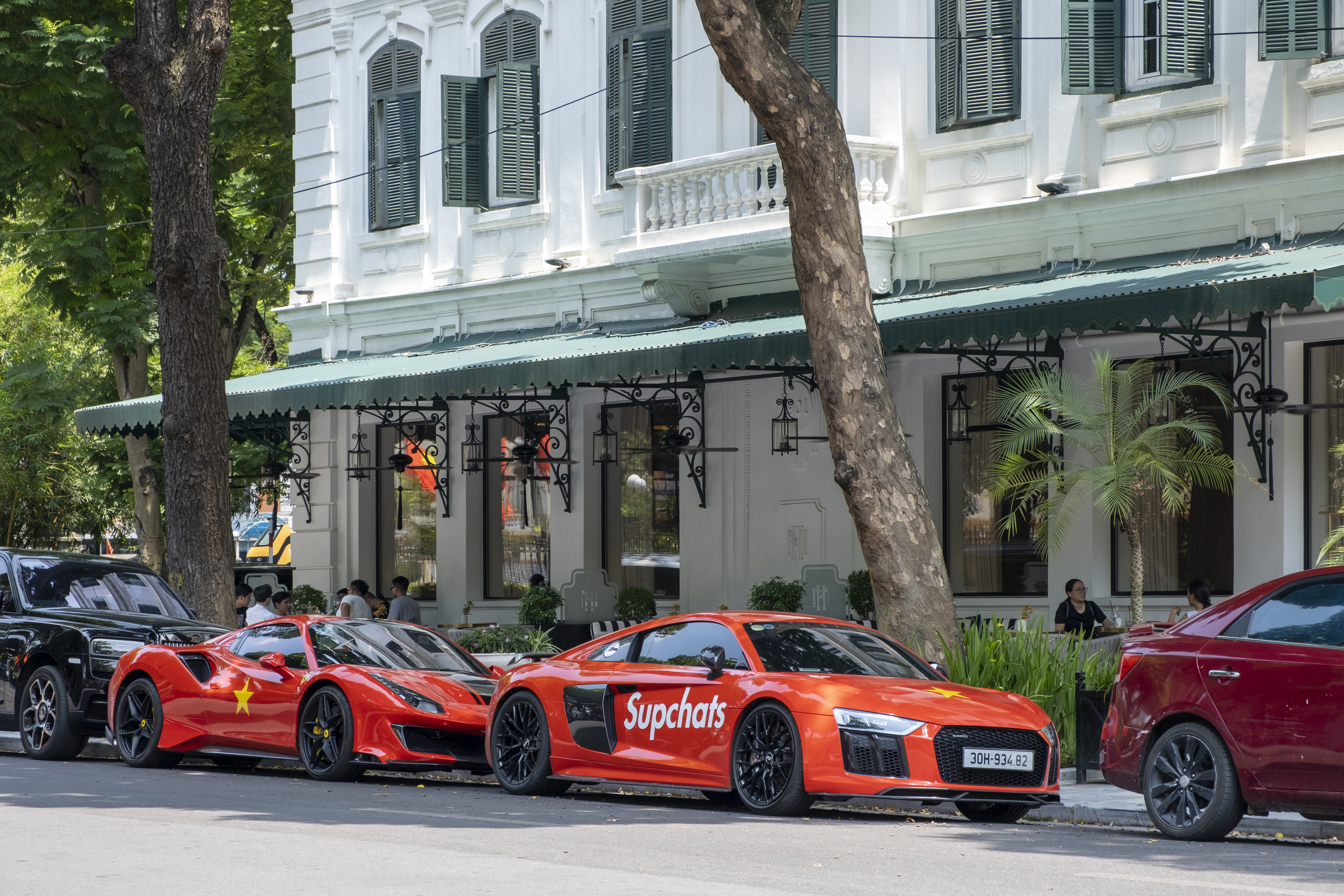
Hotel Metropôle Hanoi

=== National parks of Vietnam ===
Vietnam has 31 national parks: Ba Bể, Ba Vì, Bạch Mã, Bái Tử Long, Bến En, Bidoup Núi Bà, Bù Gia Mập, Cát Bà, Cát Tiên, Chư Mom Ray, Chư Yang Sin, Côn Đảo, Cúc Phương, Hoàng Liên, Kon Ka Kinh, Lò Gò–Xa Mát, Cape Cà Mau, Núi Chúa, Phong Nha-Kẻ Bàng, Phú Quốc, Phước Bình, Pù Mát, Tam Đảo, Tràm Chim, U Minh Hạ, U Minh Thượng, Vũ Quang, Xuân Sơn, Xuân Thủy, Yok Đôn.

=== World Heritage sites ===
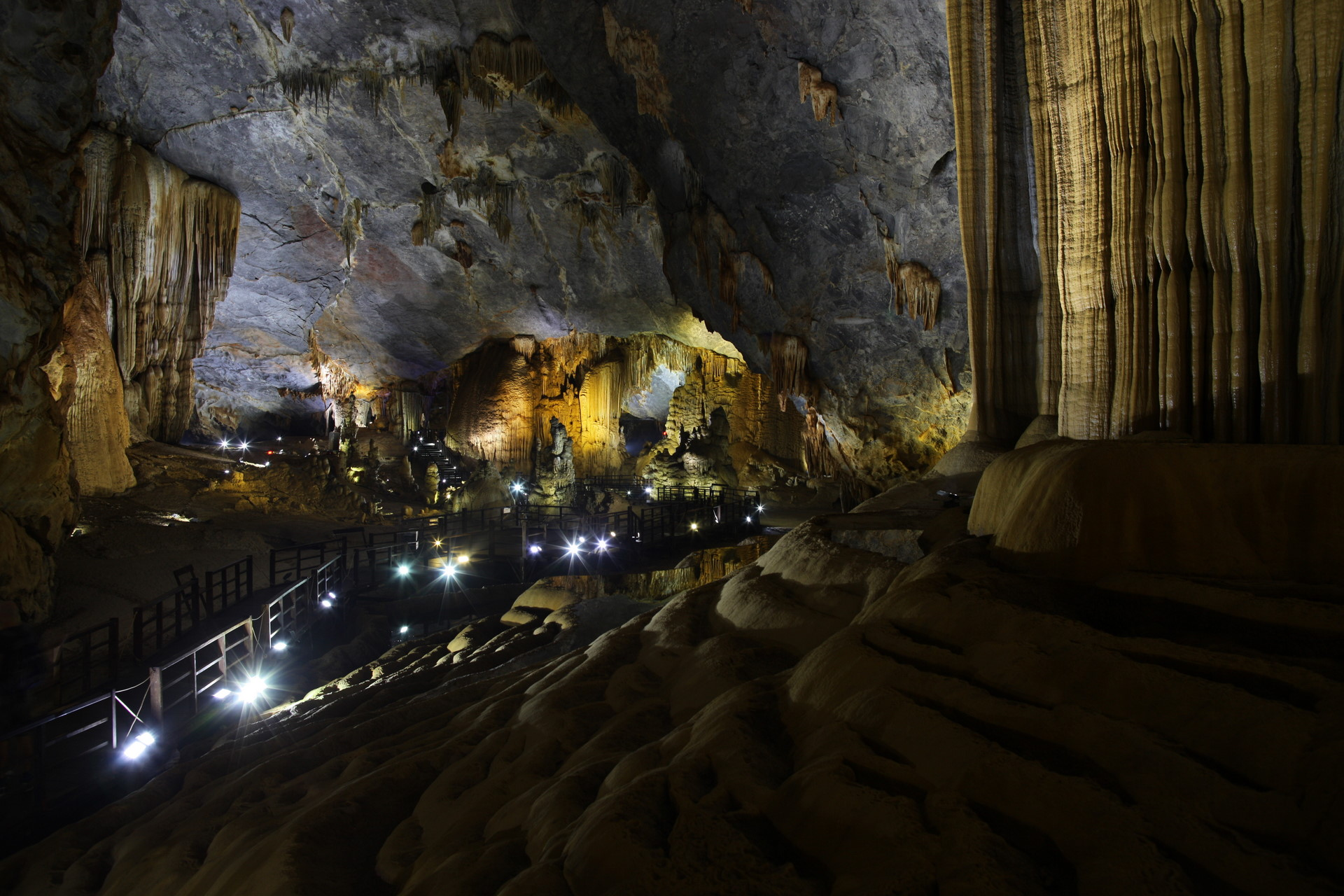
Thiên Đường Cave in Phong Nha-Kẻ Bàng National Park, Quảng Bình province

Huế, Hội An, Mỹ Sơn (Quảng Nam province), Hạ Long Bay (Quảng Ninh province), Phong Nha-Kẻ Bàng National Park (Quảng Bình province), Imperial Citadel of Thăng Long (Hanoi) and Citadel of the Hồ Dynasty (Thanh Hóa province). Hạ Long Bay is one of New Seven Natural Wonders of the world.

=== Man and the Biosphere Programme ===
Vietnam has eleven world biosphere reserves, from north to south: Cát Bà (Hai Phong), Red River Delta (Thai Binh, Nam Dinh, Ninh Binh), Western Nghệ An (Nghe An), Cù Lao Chàm (Quang Nam), Kon Hà Nừng (Gia Lai), Langbiang (Lam Dong), Núi Chúa (Ninh Thuan), Đồng Nai (Dong Nai), Cần Giờ (Ho Chi Minh City), Kiên Giang (Kien Giang) and Cape Cà Mau (Ca Mau).

Foreign tourist highly recommend the rural Vietnam and see it as the most beautiful in East Asia (Da Nang-Hue are a "want to go back every year" place)

=== National tourist area ===
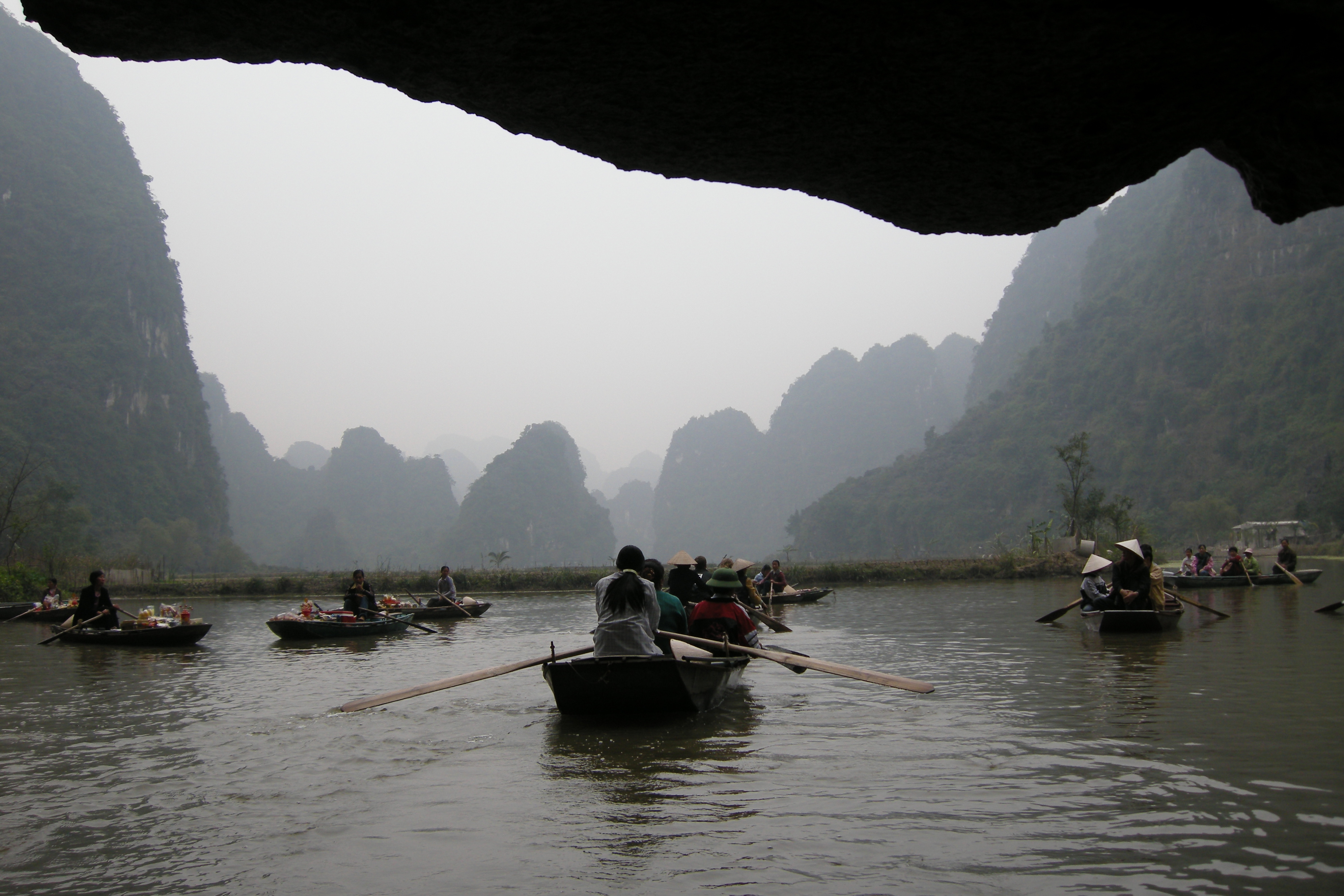
View of the Tam Cốc river and cave.

Vietnam now has 21 national tourist areas, major tourist sites that are state recognized:

Sa Pa (Lào Cai), Ba Bể (Bắc Kạn), Hạ Long Bay – Cát Bà Island (Quảng Ninh, Hai Phong), Ba Vì National Park (Hanoi), Perfume Pagoda (Hanoi), Cổ Loa Citadel (Hanoi), Tam Cốc-Bích Động (Ninh Bình), Kim Liên (Nghệ An), Phong Nha-Kẻ Bàng National Park (Quảng Bình), Ho Chi Minh trail (Quảng Trị), Lăng Cô – Hải Vân Pass – Non Nuoc (Huế and Da Nang), Hội An (Quảng Nam), Van Phong Bay (Khánh Hòa), Phan Thiết – Mũi Né (Bình Thuận), Dankia – Yellow Springs, Tuyền Lâm Lake (Lâm Đồng), Cần Giờ Mangrove Forest (Ho Chi Minh City), Côn Đảo (Bà Rịa–Vũng Tàu), Long Hai beach (Bà Rịa–Vũng Tàu), Phú Quốc (Kiên Giang), Biosphere Reserve Cape Cà Mau (Cà Mau).

=== Cities ===
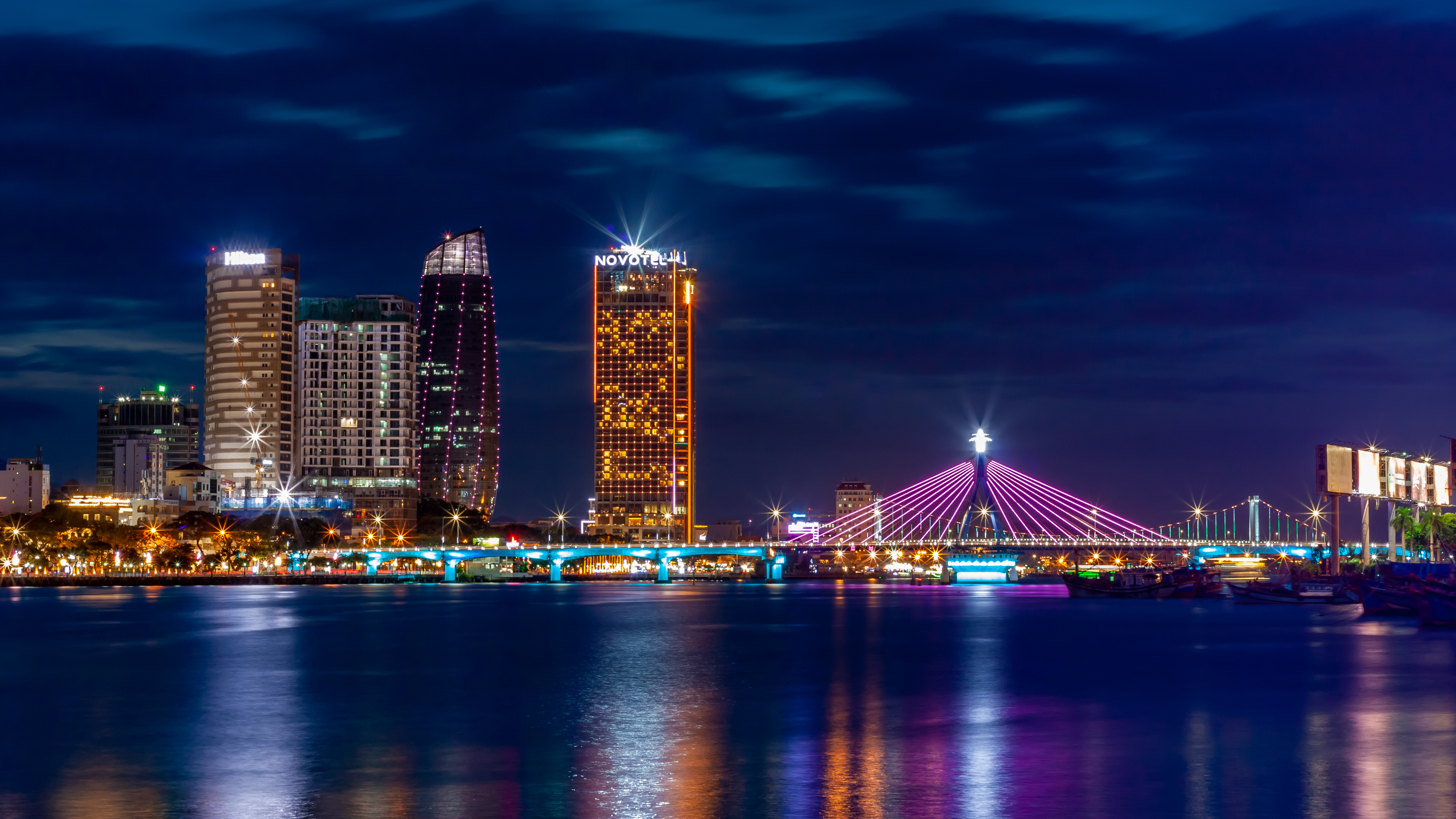
Da Nang

Since 2014, Hanoi has consistently been voted in the world's top ten destinations by TripAdvisor. It ranked 8th in 2014, 4th in 2015 and 8th in 2016.

In 2014, Hanoi, Hoi An and Ho Chi Minh City appeared in TripAdvisor's 2014 Traveller's Choice Awards for the top 25 destinations in Asia. Hanoi was ranked second, Hoi An tenth and Ho Chi Minh City eighteenth. In 2017, Đà Lạt is in the list of Asia's overlooked places by the CNN.

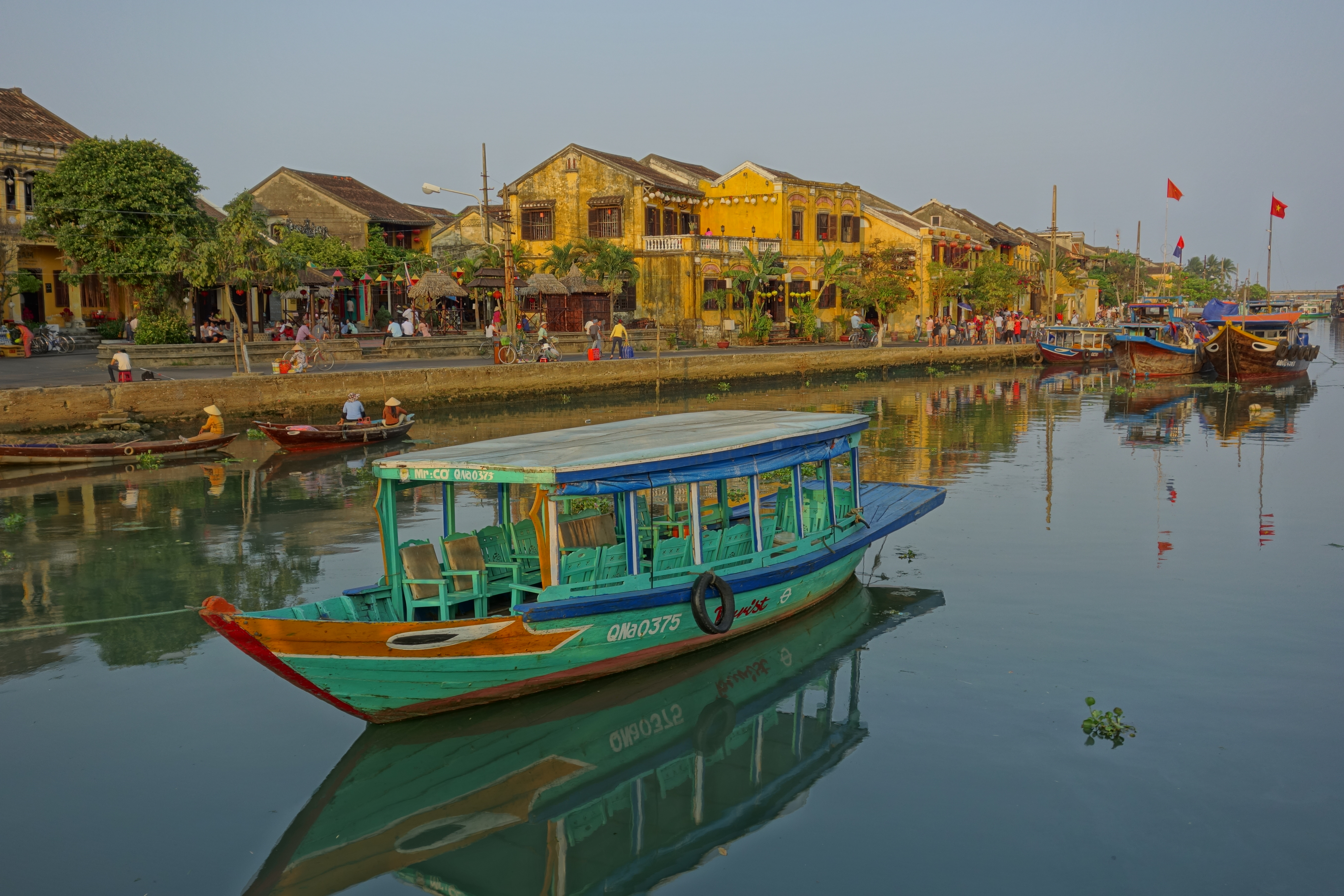
Hội An, a trading port dating from the 15th to the 19th century

== International tourist arrivals ==
=== International airports ===
Air travel is the most popular form of travel for international arrivals to Vietnam; in 2013, nearly 6 million of the 7.6 million total international arrivals were by air. Tan Son Nhat International Airport, which serves Ho Chi Minh City, is the busiest airport with the largest visitor volume. On the other hand, Noi Bai International Airport, serving Hanoi, is the largest airport in terms of land area and total capacity after its opening of the modern international terminal. Other major airports include Da Nang International Airport, Cam Ranh International Airport and Cat Bi International Airport. In March 2020 amidst the COVID-19 pandemic, Vietnam has suspended issuance of all tourist visa; however, as of September 2020, the country is still closed for foreign tourists until 2022, with plans to reopen for tourism from a limited number of Asian countries. In March 2022, Vietnam reopened to foreign tourist arrivals after COVID border closures. The industry did struggle to recovery initially, however, in the first seven months of 2024 the country welcomed 9,983,703 foreign tourists putting Vietnam on track to reach its 2019 peak of 19 million tourist arrivals.

== Military tourism ==
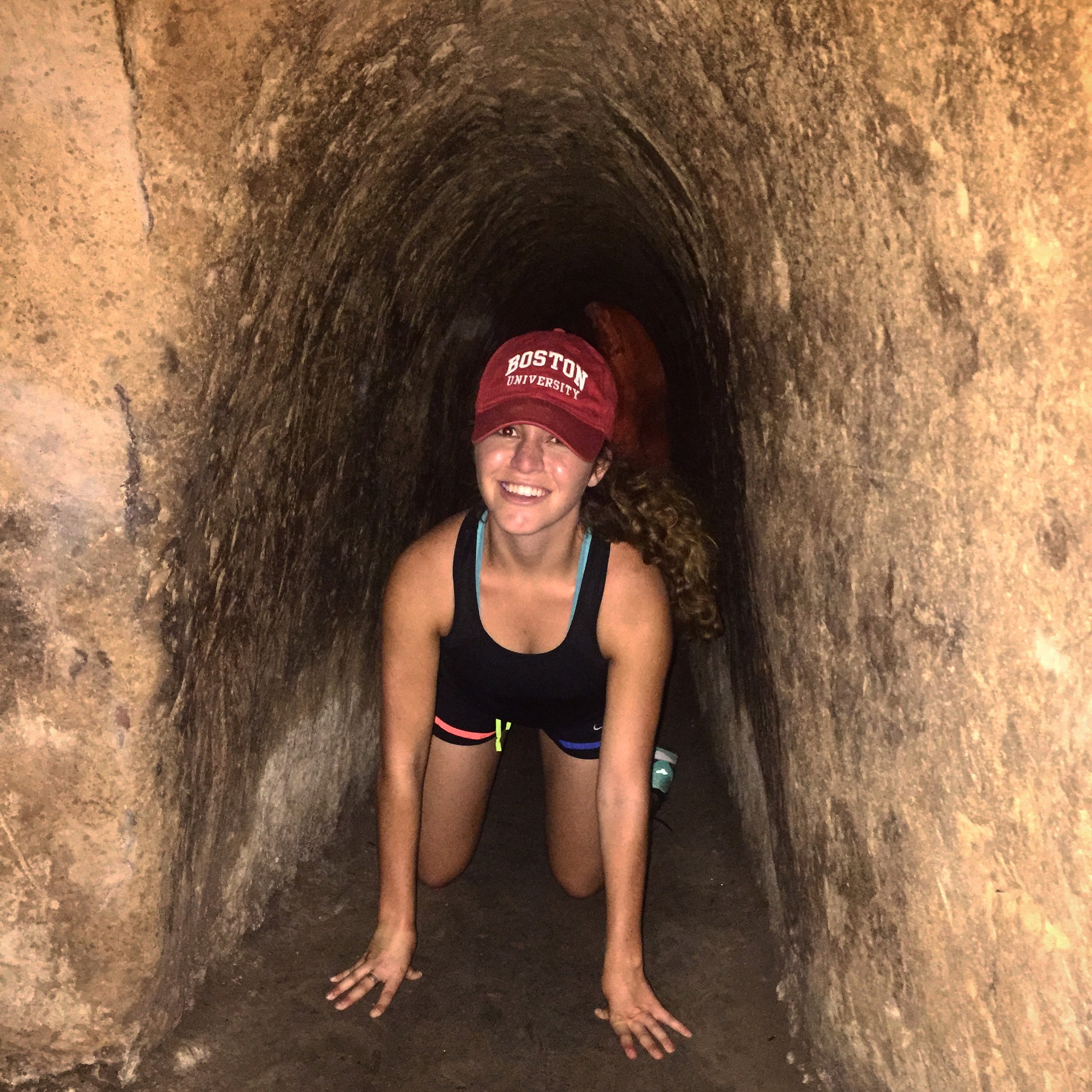
An American tourist crawling through the Cu Chi tunnels, constructed by the Viet Cong Guerrilla forces during the Vietnam War, now a popular tourist destination

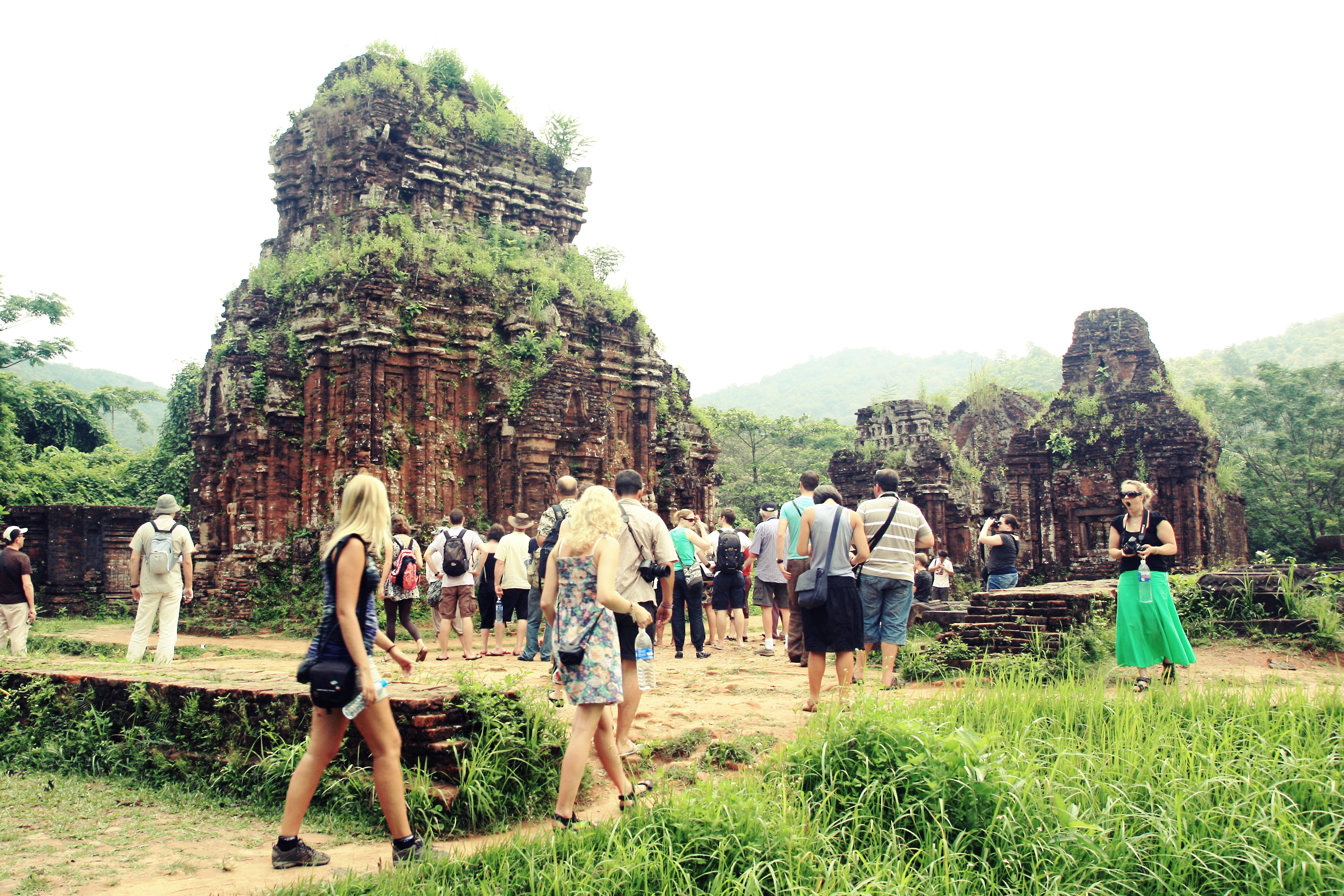
Mỹ Sơn: Ancient Champa Hindu temples in Central Vietnam

Throughout thousands of years, wars played a great role in shaping the identity and culture of people inhabited the land which is modern day Vietnam. There are numerous historical sites from Ancient Vietnam to the First Indochina War and the Second Indochina War.

Most notable ancient sites include:

- Citadel of the Ho Dynasty
- Imperial City of Hue
- Mỹ Sơn

Most notable places from the First and Second Indochina War (Vietnam War) for tourists are:

- Củ Chi tunnels
- War Remnants Museum
- Vietnam Military History Museum
- Hoa Lo Prison

== Concerns ==
Vietnam's tourism is facing numerous issues such as environmental pollution, poorly maintained heritage sites, aggressive solicitation of tourists, arbitrary price hikes for accommodations, poor infrastructure and transportation, substandard services, and ineffective management. According to industry assessments, since 2006, over 70% of international tourists who visit Vietnam have no intention of returning.

Due to these shortcomings compared to neighboring countries, Vietnam's tourism sector overly exploits natural attractions. The commercialization of these sites, allowing companies to charge entrance fees—often at high rates—without adequate maintenance, has led to the deterioration or damage of many landscapes, such as Voi Waterfall and Lien Khuong Waterfall. In early 2017, during a conference reviewing the 2016 performance and setting tasks for 2017, Prime Minister Nguyễn Xuân Phúc directed the Ministry of Culture, Sports, and Tourism to address the issue of tourists not returning to Vietnam. He expressed, "I just checked my smartphone and read an article listing seven fears of visiting Vietnam: overcharging, robbery, lack of hygiene."

== Medical & Wellness Tourism ==
Vietnam has rapidly emerged as a prominent hub for medical and wellness tourism in Southeast Asia, driven by an annual medical sector growth rate of 18% to 20%. The country attracts approximately 300,000 medical tourists annually, generating an estimated US$2 billion in revenue. Key drivers of this boom include a central geographic location, political stability, a burgeoning middle class, and highly affordable treatment costs compared to regional neighbors.

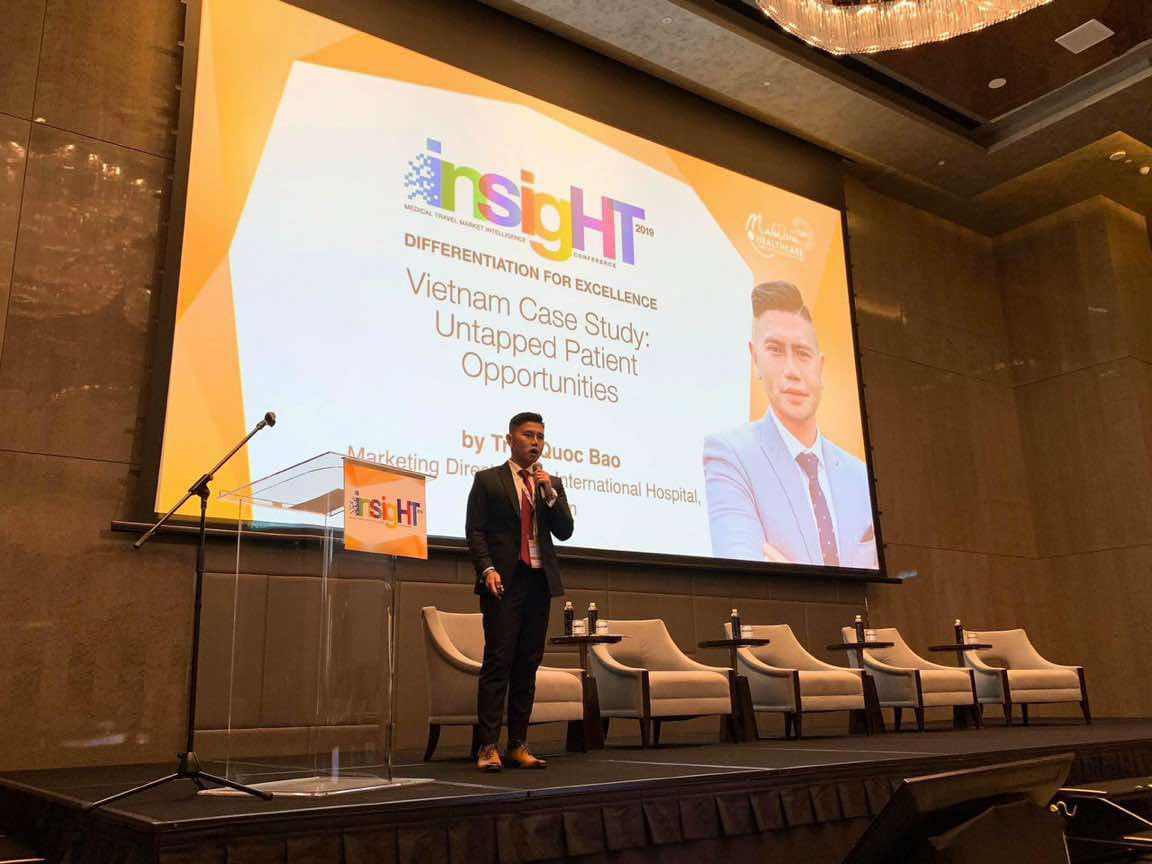
Mr. Tran Quoc Bao, Managing Director of City International Hospital, a healthcare management and medical tourism expert in Vietnam received the “Outstanding Healthcare Travel Leadership Award 2019” from the Malaysia Healthcare Travel Council (MHTC), in recognition of his contributions to the medical tourism industry in the region.

Private healthcare networks have seen massive foreign direct investment and high-profile acquisitions from international groups based in Singapore and Malaysia, shifting the market toward specialized medical "centres of excellence." Dr. Tran Quoc Bao, a prominent healthcare executive who has served as the Managing Director of City International Hospital and Chief Executive Officer of Prima Saigon Medical Center, highlights that while Vietnam possesses immense potential—particularly in attracting the overseas Vietnamese diaspora for seasonal treatments—the sector still faces hurdles. To sustain this momentum, Dr. Tran Quoc Bao emphasizes the critical need to increase the number of internationally accredited (such as JCI) hospitals to build trust, alongside launching regional digital marketing campaigns to elevate global awareness of Vietnam’s premium medical offerings.

== Externalities tourism in Vietnam ==
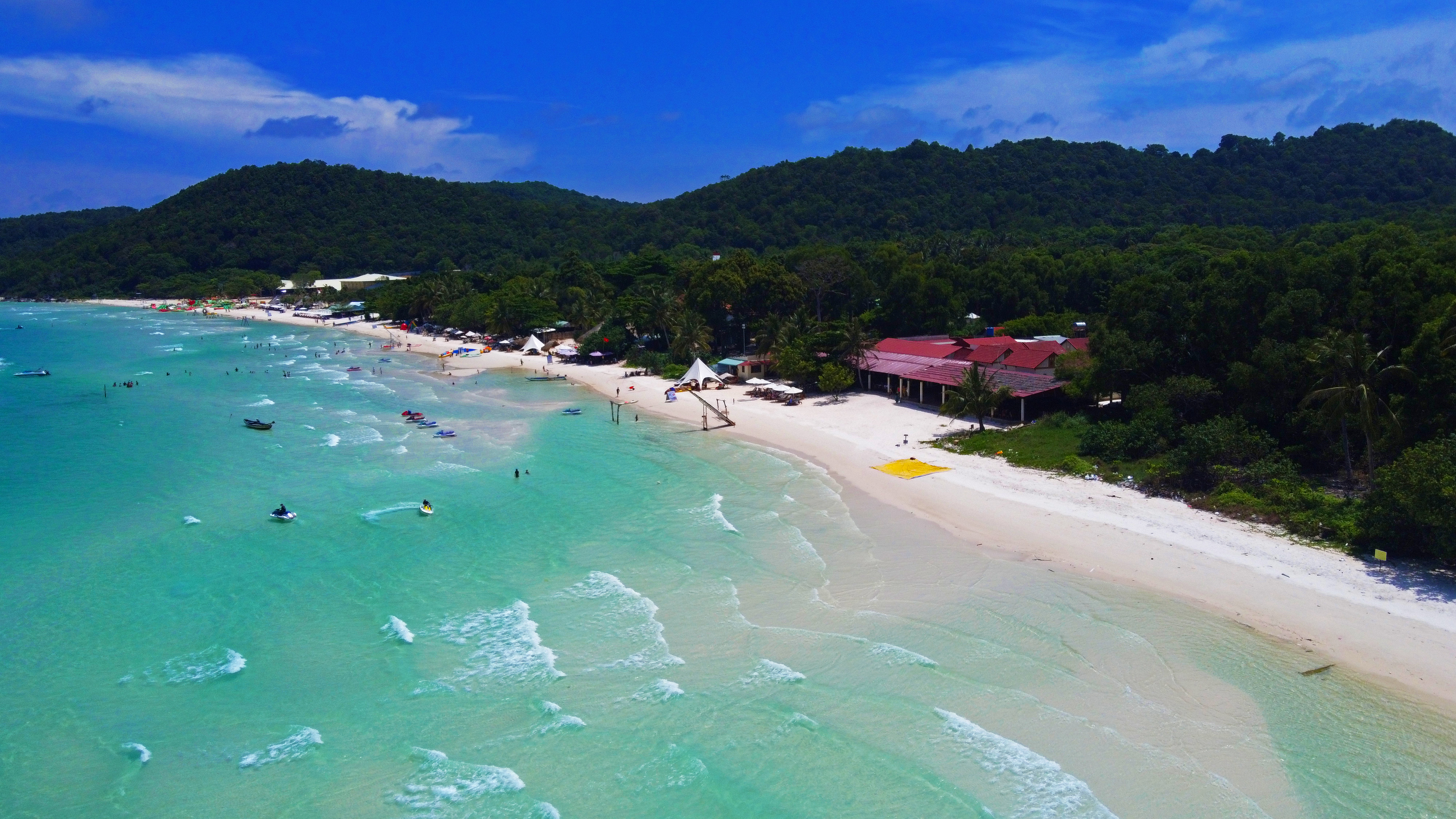
Bãi Sao beach on Phú Quốc island

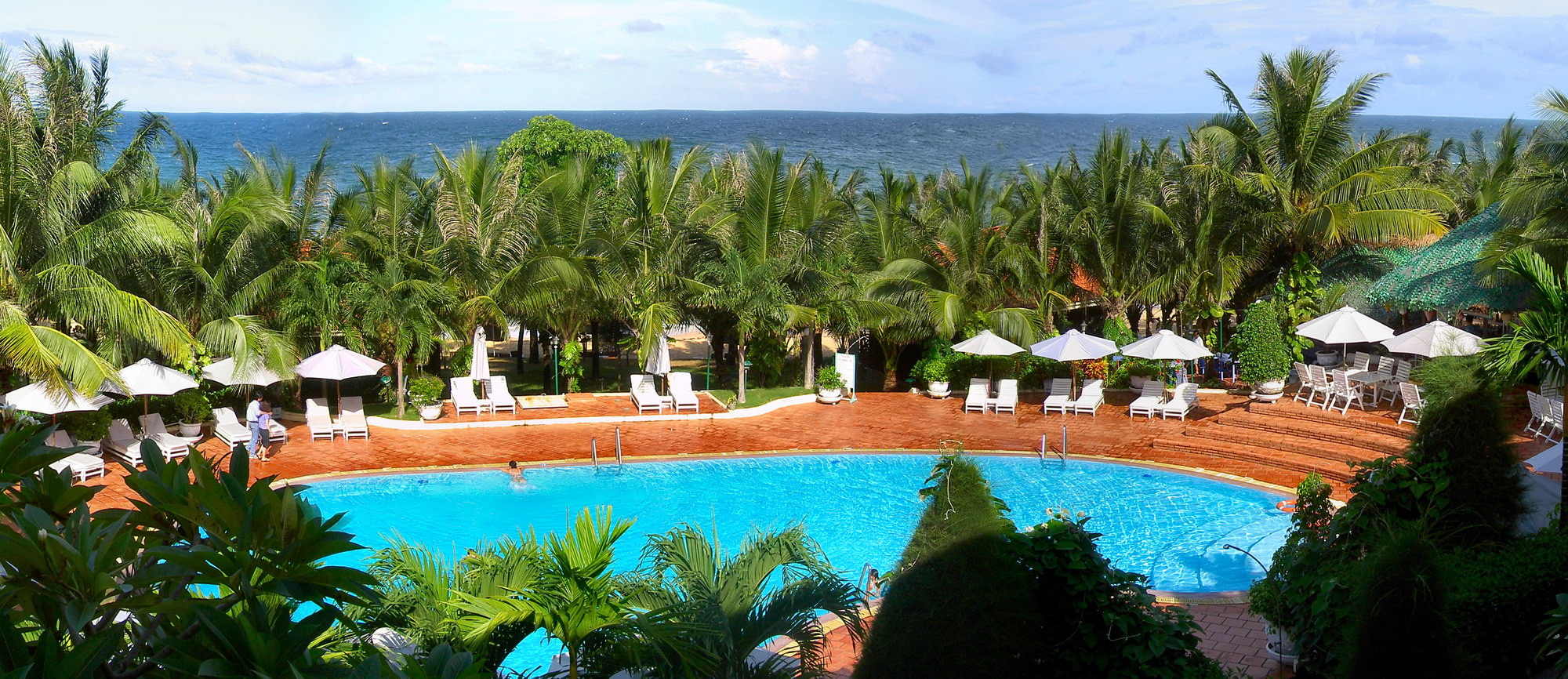
Hotel in Phú Quốc island

Travelling and tourism around the world have increased, mainly thanks to growling interest from China's middle hierarchy. Southeast Asia is an attractive tourist destination in recent years, which bolstered economic opportunities for countries located there. Vietnam benefited greatly from such a trend. The tourism demand right before the COVID pandemic was projected to grow yearly roughly by 4 per cent (2019–2029). While the outlook will most likely not reach this target, we can expect a very volatile outcome that will most likely not be able to meet the estimated growth. Even then, in the year 2018, the Southeast Asia tourist destination had over 130 million international visitors. (9.3 per cent of total global international visitor flows), and the region's share of the worldwide market is expected to expand further to 10.4 per cent by 2030 (or 187 million visitors). At the same time, nobody can predict how the Chinese outbound travellers confidence in travelling will be affected. Before the pandemic, the Chinese outbound travellers had a growth of 21.7% annually between 2012 and 2017.

Vietnam is a very popular tourist destination thanks to its diverse nature and culture. According to the World Economic forum's (WEF), Vietnam ranked 32nd globally in one of 120 countries with reference to its natural and folk sources and followed Indonesia and Thailand among the Southeast Asia region in the latest 2017 Tourism Competitiveness Index. Vietnam can offer tourists a broad range of activities, starting from eight UNESCO World Heritage sites, various oceans and beaches. There are cities such as Ha Noi, Ho Chi Minh and Da Nang that can offer fulfilling nightlife, shopping malls, and rich and diverse street food cuisine for urban lovers.

In addition, the Government of Vietnam is prioritizing tourism as a critical target to drive socio-economic development. The aim is to make Vietnam a top destination in Southeast Asia. To achieve the goal, the government is now preparing an innovative tourism strategy for the period 2018 to 2030 to spur the development of the tourism industry in the next decade. Many countries in Southeast Asia, including Vietnam, focus on tourism development on their economic development plan. Vietnam had acquired a surge in domestic and international tourism in over ten years, thanks to its strategy of focusing on market segments where it has a competitive advantage. Specifically, the number of multinational tourists to Vietnam had approximately quadrupled from 4.2 million in 2008 to 15.5 million in 2018. International arrivals increase to 25% from an average of around 9% per year, so travel transport industries such as airline and road also significantly increased. With domestic tourists, strong growth is what the government captures the growing demand for tourism in the region. For foreign tourists, the growth is more prominent than other rival countries in Southeast Asia, with the exception of Myanmar. As a result, Vietnam has been and is a bright spot on the world's tourist map, which is comparable to famous tourist countries in Asia such as Thailand, China, and Japan.

Despite these benefits, the tourism industry in Vietnam still has critical weaknesses in its relatively competitive aspect. The government's allocation of spending to the tourism sector is relatively low at 1.4% of total government spending in 2017. Although the tourism industry is strategically important, the vision for change in the tourism industry has not changed significantly. Indiscriminate disposal of waste, protection of marine life, forest animals, and environmental pollution are the issues that seriously affect this smokeless industry. Another major hurdle associated with foreign tourists is the visa regime. The government is still not open to the problem of visas as only 24 countries in the world are exempt from permits, which reduces the attraction of people to Vietnam.

However, the COVID-19 pandemic strongly affected Vietnam's tourism as all international commercial flights were banned from landing at all international airports in Vietnam. International tourists, the primary source of revenue for the tourism industry, have declined dramatically in the past year. The number of flights in October 2020 decreased by 80% compared to the same period last year. Hotel room capacity is only 30%. The inability of foreign tourists to come to Vietnam has a massive impact on the revenue of the tourism industry and the economy, as this group spends much more heavily than domestic tourists. In 2019, the tourism industry accounts for 12% of the country's GDP, international visitors only 17% but more than half: on average, each foreign tourist spends US$673, while domestic tourists only spend US$61. The tourism industry created 660 thousand jobs in the period 2014–2019. and the drop in tourist spending also brought the food, beverage and retail industries into a dire situation.

During the COVID-19 epidemic the government adopted a policy of "0 cases in the community". Domestic stimulus programs target Vietnamese and foreign permanent residents. Tourism products aimed at human health, sports tourism, medical treatment, ecology, yoga, and nature-friendly tourism are becoming more popular.

== See also ==
- Visa policy of Vietnam
- List of museums in Vietnam
