= Griffin's leaf-nosed bat =

Conservation status
- Near Threatened (IUCN 3.1)

Scientific classification
- Kingdom: Animalia
- Phylum: Chordata
- Class: Mammalia
- Order: Chiroptera
- Family: Hipposideridae
- Genus: Macronycteris
- Species: H. griffini

Binomial name
- Hipposideros griffini Thong et al., 2012

Species of bat

Griffin's leaf-nosed bat (Hipposideros griffini) is a species of roundleaf bats. First seen in 2008, it was formally described in 2012. It is found only in Vietnam, and only at two places, Cát Bà Island in northern Vietnam, and Chư Mom Ray National Park. It is generally similar to the species complex of the great roundleaf bat (Hipposideros armiger), with which it shares the habitat, but has distinguishing characters. It is relatively smaller and its sound navigation, echolocation, is different.

According to the World Wide Fund for Nature report, it became one of the 367 important new species discovered in the Greater Mekong during 2012 and 2013.

== Etymology ==
Griffin's leaf-nosed bat is named after Donald Redfield Griffin, a professor of zoology at Rockefeller University in New York, who discovered animal echolocation.

== Discovery ==
Griffin's leaf-nosed bat was first noticed by Vu Dinh Thong in Chư Mom Ray National Park in 2008, during a three-year survey of bats in Vietnam. His research team was supported by the Conservation Leadership Programme (CLP), the Harrison Institute, the University of Tübingen, and the Institute of Ecology and Biological Resources. He collected the first museum specimen, now the holotype, on 20 August 2009. It is an adult male found in the Cát Bà National Park, Cát Bà Island, in Ha Long Bay. Vu Dinh Thong initially thought that it was a species of Hipposideros armiger but soon realised that its behaviour was different. The new bat remained calm when captured, while other species are always aggressive. Studies of the echolocation pattern and DNA analyses (cytochrome-b gene and partial D-loop sequences) revealed that it was a different species. The formal scientific description was published in the 16 February 2012 issue of the Journal of Mammalogy.

== Description ==
Griffin's leaf-nosed bat is similar to the species complex of Hipposideros armiger, but with distinct acoustics, size, and DNA sequence. The sound frequencies for echolocation ranges from 76.6 to 79.2 kHz, which is higher than the frequencies produced by H. armiger subspecies, which range from 64.7 to 71.4 kHz. Its wing is 8.3–9 cm long. Its head measures 2.8–3. cm. Its nose is like a layer of leaves, and the anterior leaf has 4 supplementary leaflets of which the 2nd is the widest and longest, while the outermost is narrow and short. The tip of the ear, pinnais 2.35–2.65 cm wide and 2.75–3 cm high. The body colour varies from brown to gray.
