= Cat Ba =

Cat Ba may refer to:

- Cát Bà Island, an island in Vietnam
- Cát Bà National Park, a national park on Cát Bà Island
- Cát Bà (township), the main town on Cát Bà Island
