= List of national parks of Vietnam =

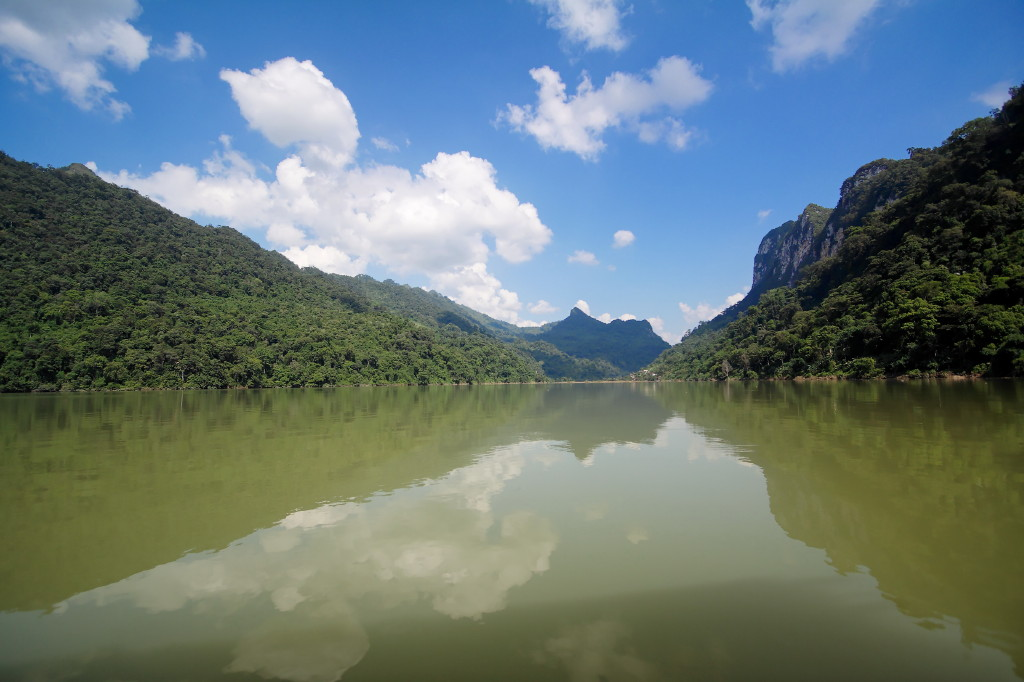
Ba Bể National Park

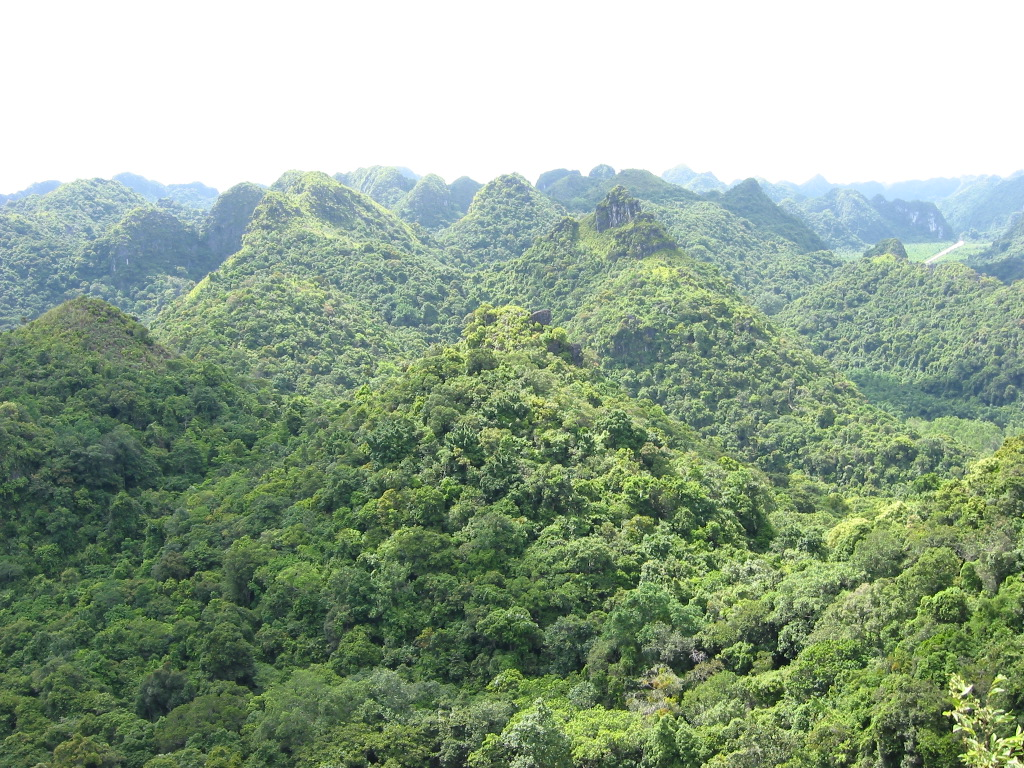
Cát Bà National Park

The National Parks in Vietnam (Vietnamese: Danh sách các vườn quốc gia tại Việt Nam) are officially recognized by the Government of Vietnam through decrees. Normally, the national parks located in the territory of multiple provinces and cities are managed by the Ministry of Agriculture and Rural Development, while the national parks located within the boundary of a province or city are managed by the People's Committee of the province or of the city.

The national parks in Vietnam, stretching from the Northern borders to the Southern remote islands, are set up in order to protect the natural ecosystems, flora and fauna, diverse natural landscapes, such as the subtropical rain forests, in Phia Oắc-Phia Đén, the sub-alpine subtropical forests, the evergreen tropical forests to the coastal mangrove forests of Xuân Thủy, Cát Bà, and Mũi Cà Mau, and the melaleuca forests on peat in U Minh Thượng and U Minh Hạ.

Currently, Vietnam has 34 national parks. Cúc Phương is the first national park and was established in 1966 in the area of 3 provinces: Ninh Bình, Thanh Hóa and Hòa Bình. Meanwhile, the latest national park established is Song Thanh (Sông Thanh), setup on December 18, 2020, located in Quảng Nam province. Phong Nha–Kẻ Bàng is the national park with the largest area, while the mangrove forests in Xuân Thủy National Park are the national park with the smallest area.

Phong Nha–Kẻ Bàng is the only national park in Vietnam recognized by UNESCO as a World Heritage Site (since 2003). In addition, part of Bái Tử Long National Park is also included in the World Heritage Site of Hạ Long Bay. Some other national parks are also on the tentative list of UNESCO Heritage sites, such as Cát Tiên and Cát Bà National Parks on Cát Bà Island, as well as Ba Bể National Park which is a part of the Ba Bể-Na Hang Natural Heritage site. Another proposed heritage site of Vietnam is Con Moong Cave located in Cúc Phương National Park (already on the list).

== List of national parks in Vietnam ==
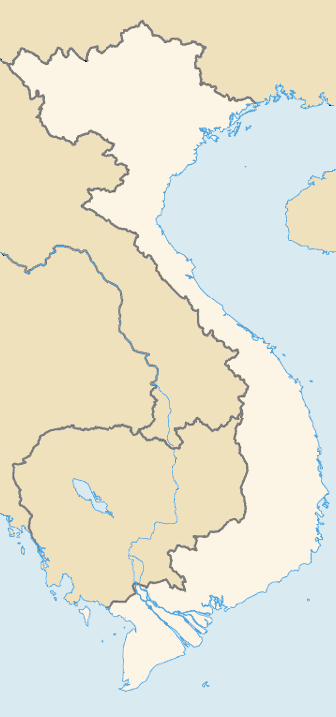
Locations of National Parks of Vietnam

Region	Name	Year established	Area (ha)	Location
Northwest	Hoàng Liên	2002	29,845	Lào Cai, Lai Châu
Northwest	Ba Bể	1992	7,610	Bắc Kạn
Northwest	Bái Tử Long	2001	15,783	Quảng Ninh
Northwest	Xuân Sơn	2002	15,048	Phú Thọ
Northwest	Tam Đảo	1996	36,883	Vĩnh Phúc, Thái Nguyên, Tuyên Quang
Northwest	Du Già	2015	15,006	Hà Giang
Northwest	Phia Oắc – Phia Đén	2018	10,593	Cao Bằng
Red River Delta	Ba Vì	1991	10,815	Hà Nội
Red River Delta	Cát Bà	1986	15,200	Hải Phòng
Red River Delta	Cúc Phương	1994	22,200	Ninh Bình, Thanh Hóa, Hòa Bình
Red River Delta	Xuân Thủy	2003	7,100	Nam Định
North Central Coast	Bến En	1992	14,735	Thanh Hóa
North Central Coast	Pù Mát	2001	91,113	Nghệ An
North Central Coast	Vũ Quang	2002	55,029	Hà Tĩnh
North Central Coast	Phong Nha–Kẻ Bàng	2001	85,754	Quảng Bình
North Central Coast	Bạch Mã	1991	22,030	Thừa Thiên Huế
South Central Coast	Phước Bình	2006	19,814	Ninh Thuận
South Central Coast	Núi Chúa	2003	29,865	Ninh Thuận
Central Highlands	Chư Mom Ray	2002	56,621	Kon Tum
Central Highlands	Kon Ka Kinh	2002	41,780	Gia Lai
Central Highlands	Yok Đôn	1991	115,545	Đắk Lắk
Central Highlands	Chư Yang Sin	2002	58,947	Đắk Lắk
Central Highlands	Bidoup Núi Bà	2004;	64,800	Lâm Đồng
Central Highlands	Tà Đùng	2018	20,938	Đắc Nông
Southeast	Cát Tiên	1992	73,878	Đồng Nai, Lâm Đồng, Bình Phước
Southeast	Bù Gia Mập	2002	26,032	Bình Phước
Southeast	Côn Đảo	1993	15,043	Bà Rịa–Vũng Tàu
Southeast	Lò Gò–Xa Mát	2002	18,765	Tây Ninh
Mekong Delta	Tràm Chim	1994	7,588	Đồng Tháp
Mekong Delta	U Minh Thượng	2002	8,053	Kiên Giang
Mekong Delta	Mũi Cà Mau	2003	41,862	Cà Mau
Mekong Delta	U Minh Hạ	2006	8,286	Cà Mau
Mekong Delta	Phú Quốc	2001	31,422	Kiên Giang

== See also ==
- National park
- List of World Heritage Sites in Vietnam
