= Tuyền Lâm Lake =

- Hồ Tuyền Lâm (Vietnamese)
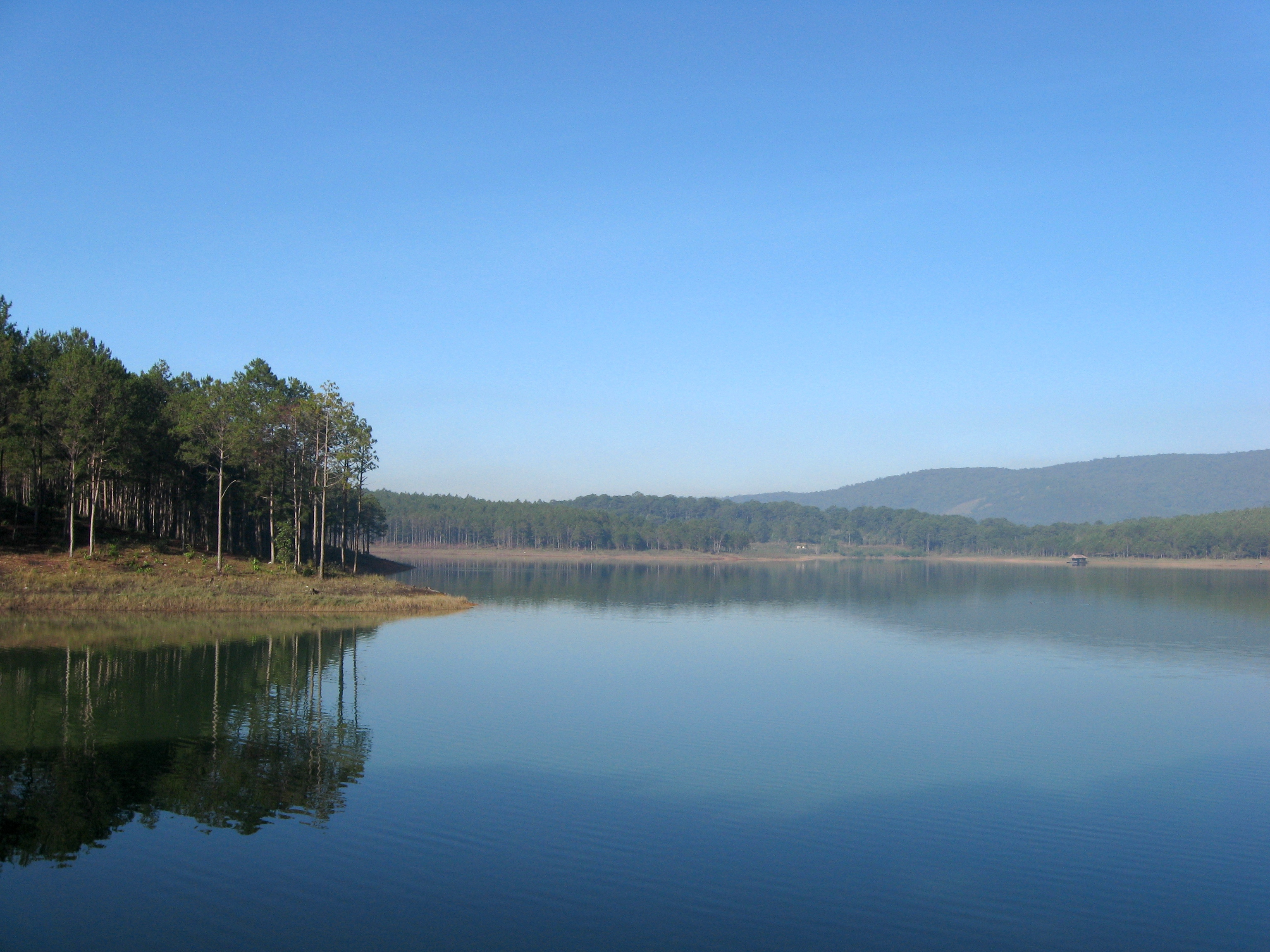
- Tuyền Lâm Lake

- Location within Vietnam
- Location: Da Lat, Lâm Đồng Province
- Coordinates: 11.893°N 108.425°E
- Type: Reservoir
- Etymology: Tuyền – stream Lâm – forest
- River sources: Da Tria Creek
- Basin countries: Vietnam

Tuyền Lâm Lake (Vietnamese: Hồ Tuyền Lâm) is a reservoir in the city of Da Lat, Lâm Đồng province, Vietnam. It is currently one of the 7 national tourism areas recognized by the Prime Minister of Vietnam. Trúc Lâm Temple can be reached by cable car.
