= Non Nước Village =

Non Nước Village, known as "marble village" (làng đá Non Nước), is a village near Non Nước caves and beach in Da Nang, Vietnam. The area is part of one of the 21 National Tourism Areas.

== Scale and products ==
In 2014, the craft village comprised nearly 500 production establishments employing approximately 3,000 workers. Its products were supplied to the domestic market and exported to destinations including the United States and Europe. Annual revenue was reported at between VND 100 billion and VND 120 billion during this period.
