= Tràm Chim National Park =

National park in Vietnam

- Vườn quốc gia Tràm Chim
- IUCN category II (national park)
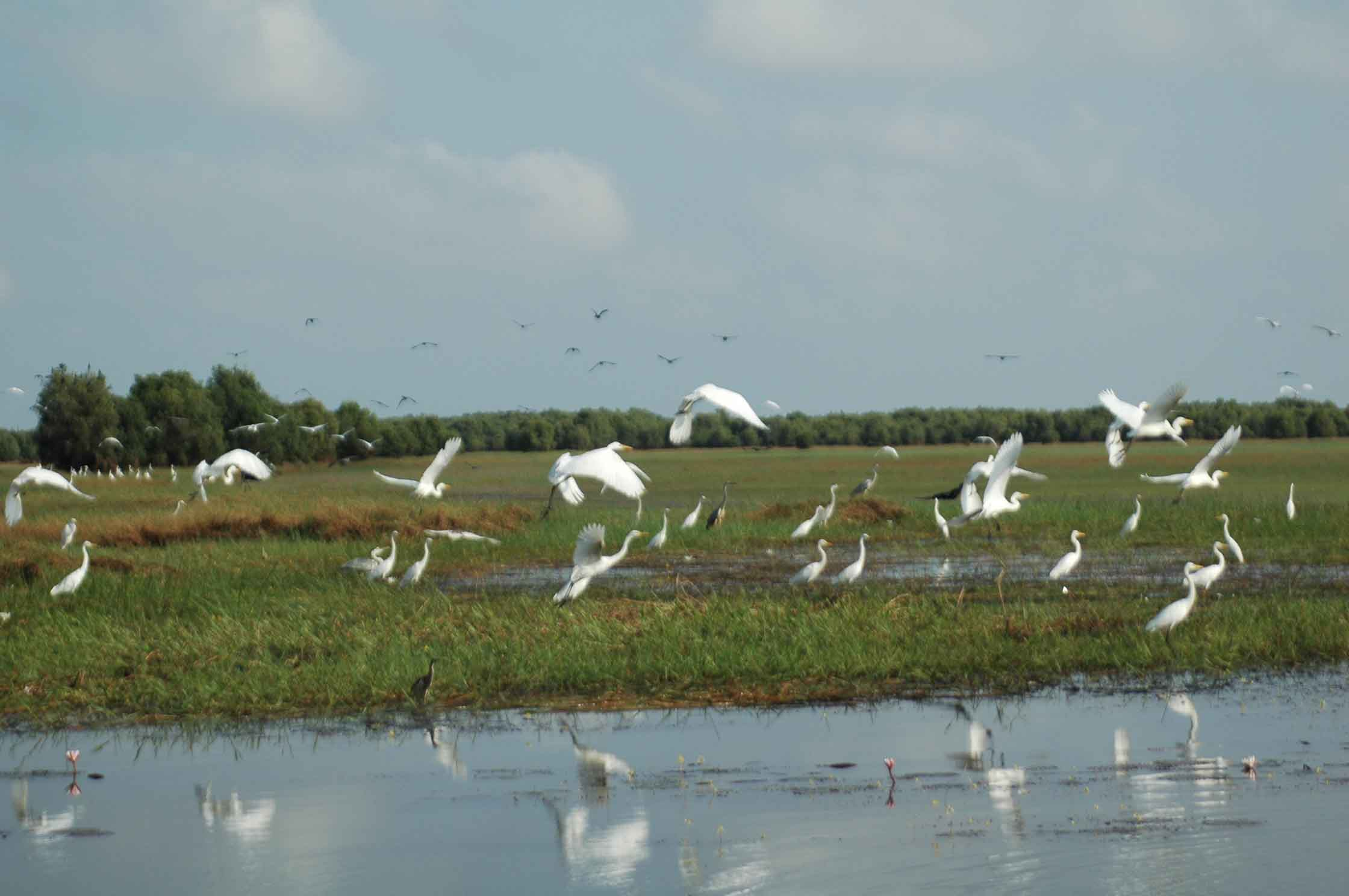
- Wetland at Tram Chim National Park

- Location within Vietnam
- Location: Tam Nông, Đồng Tháp, Vietnam
- Nearest city: Cao Lãnh
- Coordinates: 10°43′30″N 105°31′00″E
- Area: 75.88 km^{2} (29.30 sq mi)
- Established: 1998
- Governing body: People's Committee of Đồng Tháp Province

Ramsar Wetland
- Official name: Tram Chim National Park
- Designated: 2 February 2012
- Reference no.: 2000

Tràm Chim National Park (Vietnamese: Vườn quốc gia Tràm Chim) is a national park in the Plain of Reeds in the Mekong Delta region of Vietnam. The park was created to restore a degraded wetland, in order to protect several rare birds, especially the sarus crane (Grus antigone sharpii)—a species listed on the IUCN Red List. It is also a designated wetland of international importance under the Ramsar Convention.

== Ecology ==
In its natural state, the Plain of Reeds was a seasonal wetland, covered in shallow water for three to six months annually, with annual grass fires in the dry season. Vegetation is thought to have been dominated by Melaleuca cajuputi trees, grasses, and other grass-like species such as sedges and Eleocharis. Human modification of the environment began in the 18th century, with rice cultivation.

During the Vietnam War, the area was drained and vegetation burned for strategic reasons, which had the effect of drying out and oxidizing the acid sulfate soils, making them highly acidic and inhospitable. Fires also increased in frequency. Efforts began in 1985 to restore the flooding regime, with success in attracting wildlife.

After restoration, species that used to inhabit the area returned, including birds such as the sarus crane and Bengal florican, fish like the giant barb, and grasses like Oryza rufipogon. The fish provide an important role in feeding the local population.

== Park history ==
In 1985, Tram Chim was established by the provincial government as Tram Chi'm Afforestation and Fishery Company with the goals of planting Melaleuca cajuputi, exploiting aquatic resources, and preserving the Plain of Reeds area. In 1986, the sarus crane was found here. In 1991, Tram Chim became a provincial-level natural reserve to specifically protect the cranes. In 1994, the reserve became a national natural reserve by the decision Circular 4991/KGVX. The protected area covers 7,500 hectares (29 sq mi). In September 1998, the area was adjusted to 7,588 hectares (29.30 sq mi). In 1998, this area became Tram Chim National Park by the governmental decision 253/1998/QĐ dated December 29, 1998.
