= U Minh Hạ National Park =

National park in Vietnam

- IUCN category II (national park)
- Location within Vietnam
- Location: Mekong Delta, Vietnam
- Nearest city: Cần Thơ
- Coordinates: 9°15′05″N 104°56′43″E
- Area: 8,286 km^{2} (3,199 sq mi)
- Established: 2006
- Governing body: People's Committee of Cà Mau Province

U Minh Hạ National Park (Vietnamese: Vườn quốc gia U Minh Hạ) or National Park of Lower U Minh is a national park of Vietnam. The park is located in Cà Mau province (communes of Khánh Lâm, Khanh An and Đá Bạc). The park has an area of 82.86 square kilometers and was established on 20 January 2006 to protect low wetland ecosystem in the region. Fauna and flora found here include mangrove, snake, turtle, bird, amphibian.

The people living in U Minh Hạ Forest have occupations related to the forest such as raising bees, fishing, catching eels, and planting fruit trees. They are very protective of their home. The people of the forest rely on the start of the rainy season for the forest to turn into a large breeding ground for fish, so that they can catch the fish.
