= Chư Mom Ray National Park =

National park in Kon Tum province, Vietnam

- IUCN category II (national park)
- Location within Vietnam
- Location: South Central Coast and Central Highlands, Vietnam
- Nearest city: Da Nang
- Coordinates: 14°28′00″N 107°38′00″E
- Area: 56,621 km^{2} (21,861 sq mi)
- Established: 2002
- Governing body: People's Committee of Quảng Ngãi Province

Chư Mom Ray National Park (Vietnamese: Vườn quốc gia Chư Mom Ray) is a national park of Vietnam in the province of Quảng Ngãi, South Central Coast and Central Highlands region.

The national park was established according to the Decision number 103/2002/QĐ-TTg dated 30 July 2002 signed by the government of Vietnam. This decision turned the Nature Reserve into National Park.
