= Bù Gia Mập National Park =

National park in Vietnam

- IUCN category II (national park)
- Location within Vietnam
- Location: Đông Nam Bộ
- Nearest city: Đồng Nai
- Coordinates: 12°13′N 107°09′E
- Area: 26,032 km^{2} (10,051 sq mi)
- Established: 2002
- Governing body: Đồng Nai government

Bù Gia Mập National Park (Vietnamese language: Vườn quốc gia Bù Gia Mập) is a national park in the centrally-governed city of Đồng Nai, Vietnam.

The Bù Gia Mập National Park covers an area of 26,032 ha. The park has a 15,200 ha buffer zone area. Until 2002, the area was officially a conservation area, before the incumbent Prime Minister declared it a national park on November 27.

Much of the Bù Gia Mập National Park lies in the southern reaches of the South Central Coast and Central Highlands. The highest point in the area is 700 meters above sea level. The national park is fed by numerous river systems, including the Dak Huyet and Dak Sam rivers. The headwaters of the hydropower projects of the Thac Mo and Can Don also lie within the park.

== Flora ==
A plant survey at Bù Gia Mập National Park identified 724 plant species. The park has an extensive area of primeval forests. Dominant species include "oil trees", "perfumed wood", and rosewood; a total of 278 plant species of medicinal value were also recorded.

== Mammals ==
In 2000, the Wildlife Conservation Society Cambodia Program and various other organizations survey conducted in the southern Mondulkiri province of Cambodia, an area in the vicinity of the Bù Gia Mập National Park. The result was the confirmation of the presence of several globally threatened mammal species. This was taken as a strong evidence for the presence of the same species in the neighboring Bù Gia Mập. Some of the important species recorded were black-shanked douc, yellow-cheeked crested gibbon and gaur.

== Birds ==
The avifauna of the Bù Gia Mập National Park has not been studied thoroughly, but there is strong evidence for the presence of the Germain's peacock pheasant. The park also has the ideal habitat for the orange-necked partridge.

The Central Highlands of Vietnam

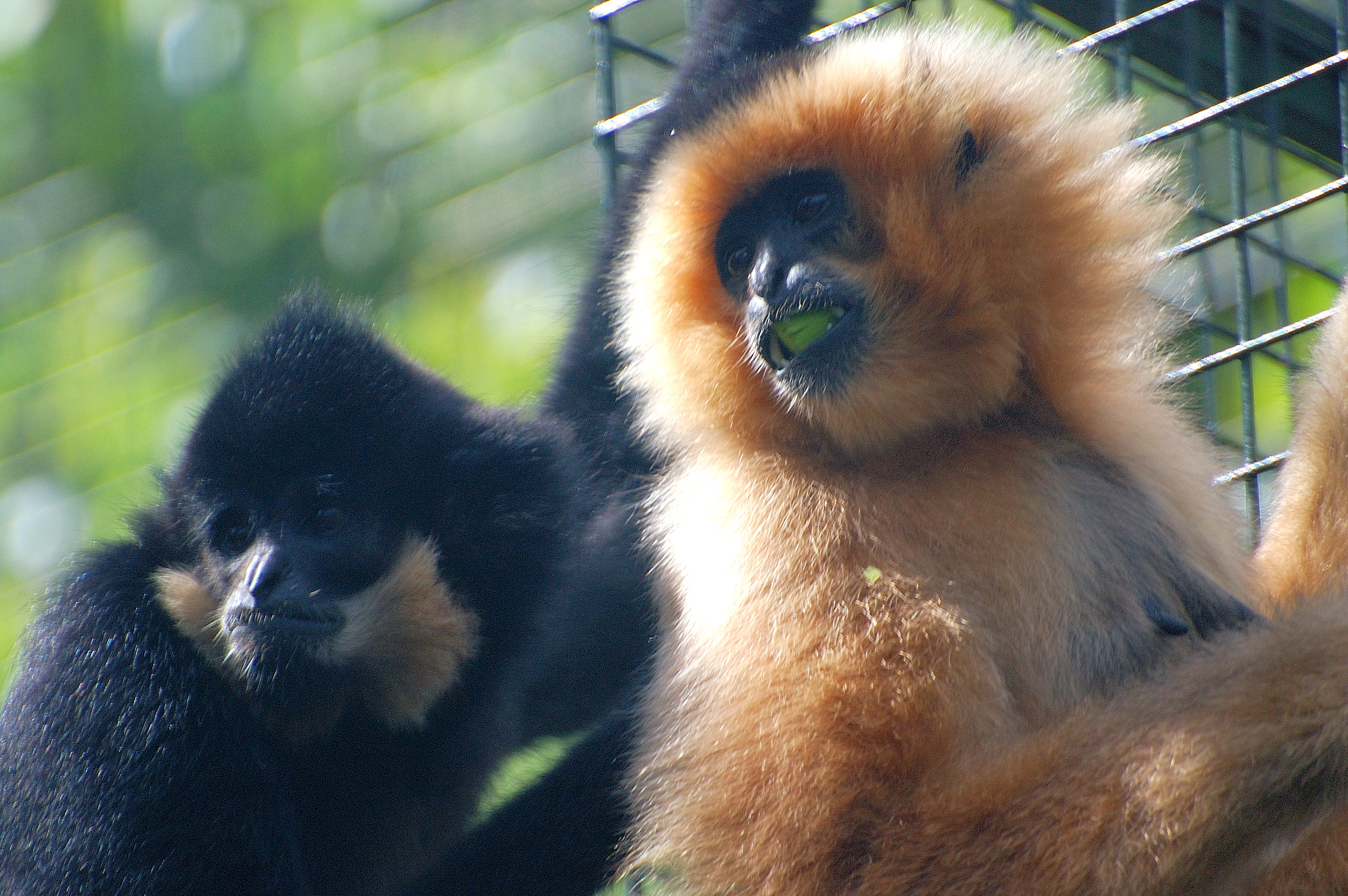
A pair of yellow-cheeked gibbons

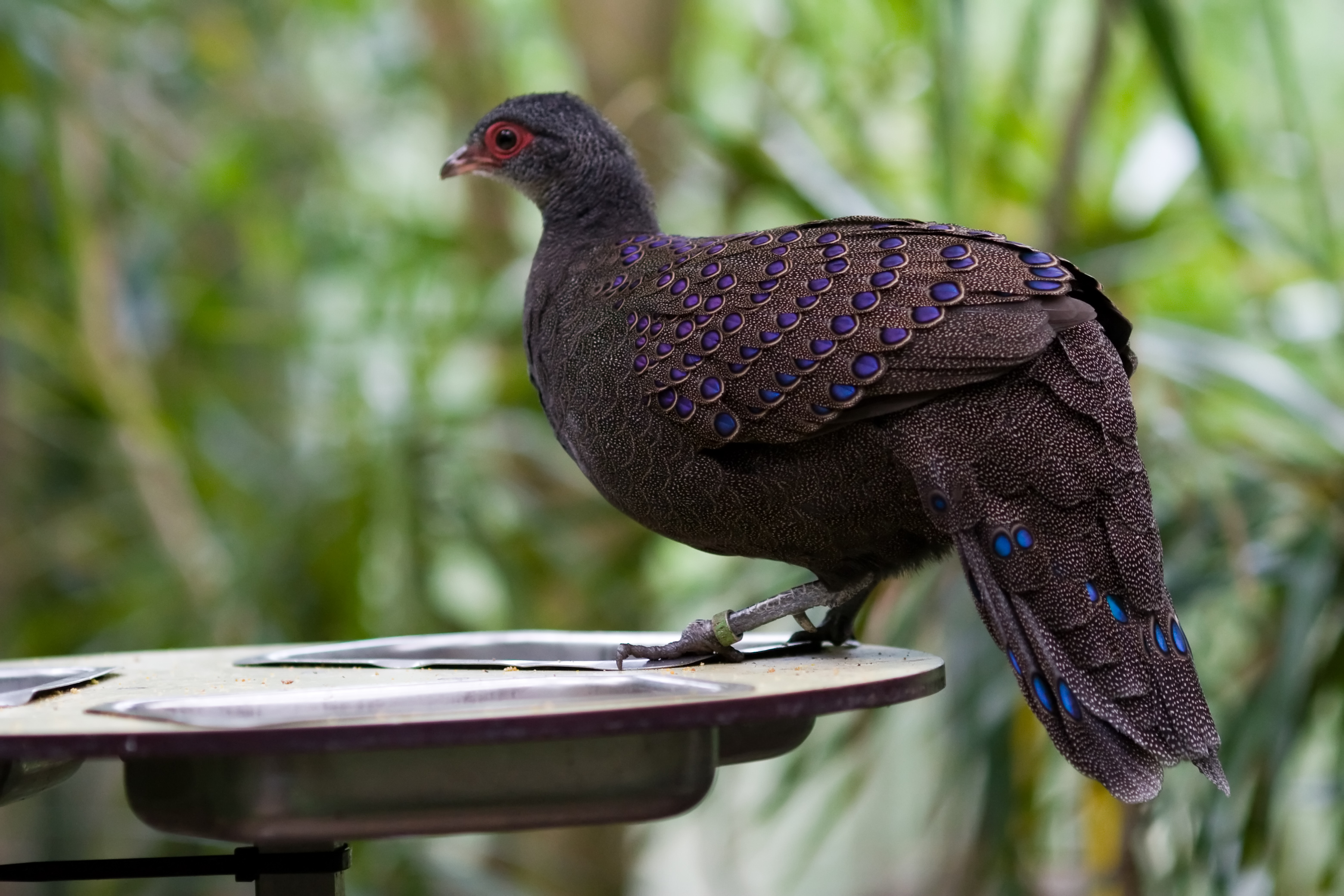
Germain's peacock pheasant
