= Cát Bà National Park =

National park in Vietnam

- IUCN category II (national park)
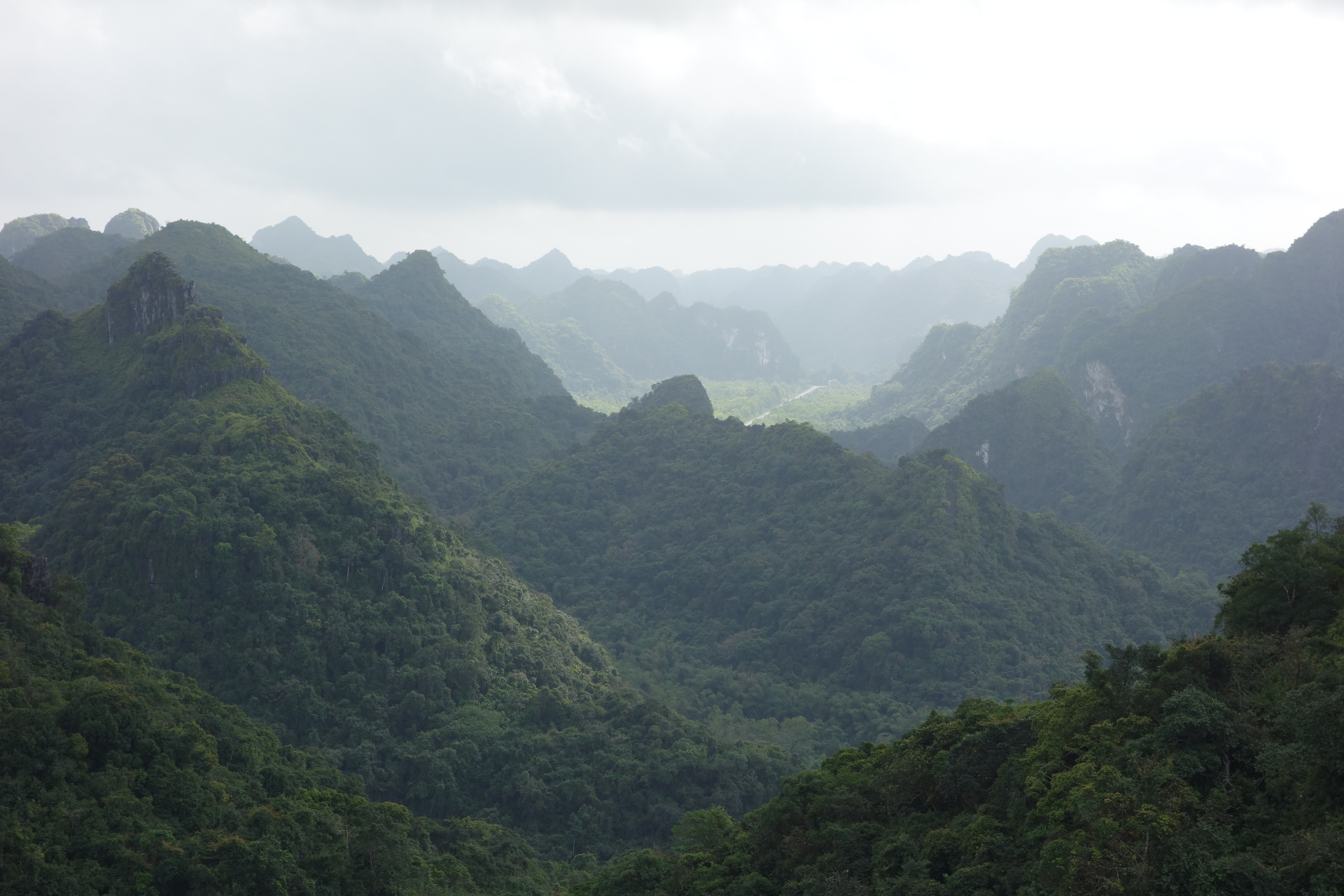
- View of the forested limestone landscape of Cát Bà National Park

- Location within Vietnam
- Location: Vietnam
- Nearest city: Hai Phong
- Coordinates: 20°47′50.00″N 107°24′25.50″E
- Area: 152.00 km^{2} (58.69 mi^{2})
- Established: 1986

Cát Bà National Park (Vietnamese: Vườn Quốc Gia Cát Bà) is a World Heritage Site designated as a biosphere reserve in northern Vietnam. The park is part of Cát Bà Island in Hạ Long Bay and is administered by the city of Haiphong. The park is located approximately 30 kilometres (19 mi) east of Hai Phong, covering about 263 square kilometres (102 sq mi) and comprising 173 square kilometres (67 sq mi) of land and 90 square kilometres (35 sq mi) of inshore water.

The Cát Bà langur, also known as the white-headed langur (Trachypithecus poliocephalus) is resident within the park and is classified by the International Union for Conservation of Nature as a critically endangered primate; one of the rarest in the world.

== History ==
Cát Bà National Park was established on 31 March 1986 under No.79/CP decision of the Council of Ministers of Vietnam (now the government). The park has been a popular tourist destination, since the mid-1990s with wealthy Chinese and Vietnamese tourists. The tourists created a demand for traditional medicine and development and logging led to the near extinction of the white-headed langur with numbers falling from 2600 to just 40 in 2003. In 2016 there are 67 (± 5).

== Geography ==
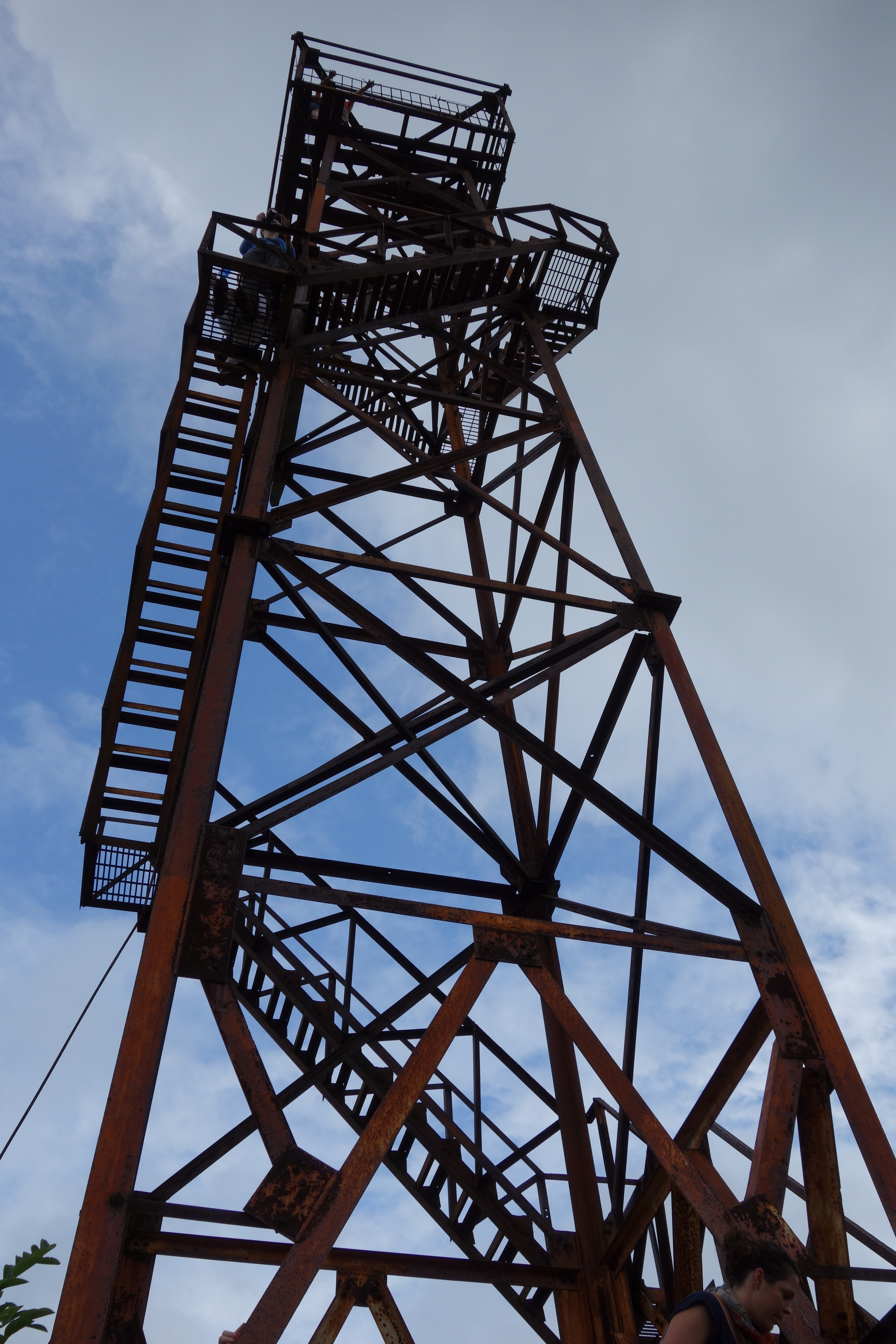
Tower in Cát Bà National Park

Cát Bà National Park is situated off the north-east shore of Viet-nam and covers most of Cát Bà island; the park headquarters are at Trung Trang. The island is mainly limestone with alternating narrow valleys running north-east to south-west. There are many rugged hills with elevation to 500 metres (1,600 ft); most are in the range 50–200 metres (160–660 ft).

The geographic coordinates are:

20 ° 43'50 "-20 ° 51'29" north latitude.
106 ° 58'20 "-107 ° 10'50" east.

There are five main soil groups:

- The limestone soil: It is weathered soils or brown reddish-brown limestone and sandstone, soil> 50 centimetres (20 in), pH = 6.5 to 7. Distributed under the forest canopy, scattered in the garden.
- The hills are forested with brown soil or weathered limestone, less acidic or near neutral. In this soil white or gray yellow brown clay shale developmson the hills, with thin and rocky soil.
- The valleys have soil on limestone, concentrated in the valleys, the natural forest cover.
- The Thing Valley land flooding, mainly developed by the accretion process, the rainy season usually submerged, surface soil medium or thin.
- The accretion of land submerged by product deposition in the estuary, the mangrove area development on the Cai Vieng, Phu Long.

The area of the park is 16,196.8 hectares (40,023 acres), of which 10,931.7 hectares (27,013 acres) is forest and 5,265.1 hectares (13,010 acres) of sea. Forest includes primary, secondary and mangrove.

== Biological resources ==
=== Flora ===
Over 1,500 species of plants have been recorded including 118 trees and 160 plants with medicinal properties.

=== Fauna ===
So far 282 species have been recorded. These include 32 species of mammals, 78 birds species, 20 species of reptiles and amphibians, 98 species of zooplankton, 196 species of marine fish and 177 species of coral. The most commonly seen mammals include civet, deer, macaques and squirrels. The island is on a major migration route for waterfowl which feed and roost in the mangrove forests.

== See also ==
- Cát Bà Island
