= Cát Bà Island =

Island in Haiphong, Vietnam

Native name: Đảo Cát Bà (Vietnamese)
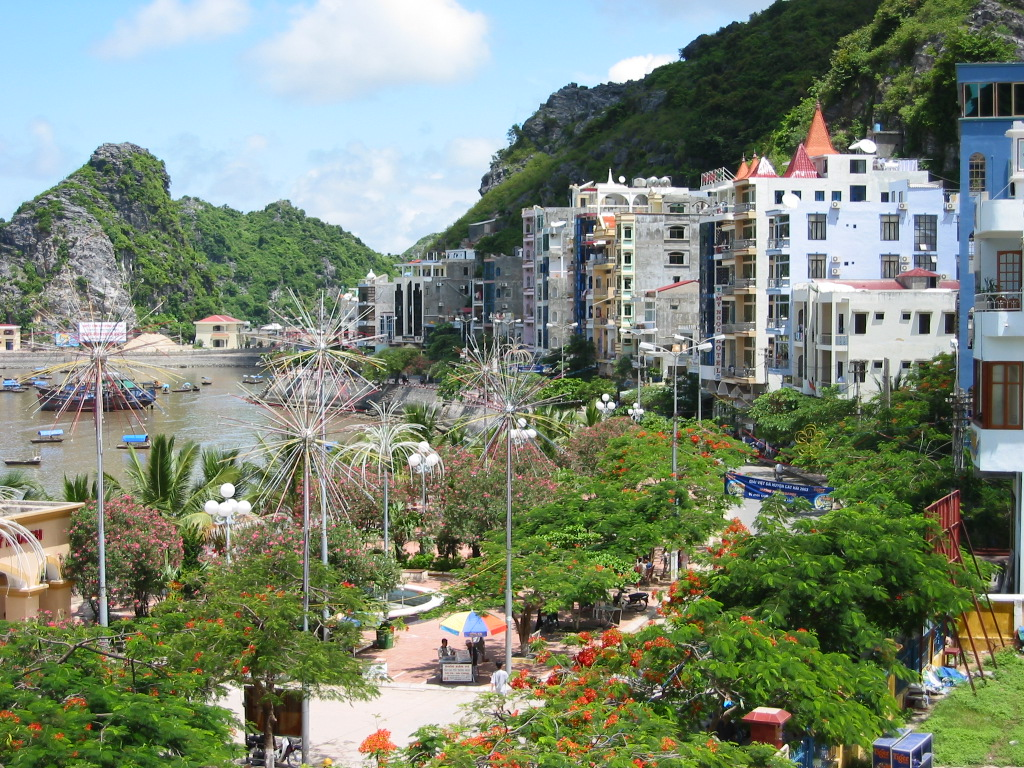
- View of Cát Bà Township.
- Interactive map of Cát Bà Island

Geography
- Location: Gulf of Tonkin
- Coordinates: 20.795°N 107.011°E
- Archipelago: Cat Ba
- Total islands: 366 or 367
- Area: 262.41 km^{2} (101.32 sq mi) (Note: Total surface area, of which 169.41 km^{2} (65.41 mi^{2}) is land area and 93 km^{2} (36 mi^{2}) is sea area.)
- Highest elevation: 322 m (1056 ft)
- Highest point: Cao Vọng mountain

Administration
- Vietnam
- City: Haiphong
- Special zone: Cat Hai

Demographics
- Population: 18,934 (2021)

Additional information
- Official website: catba.net.vn

Cát Bà Island (Vietnamese: Đảo Cát Bà, IPA: [ɗǎw kát ɓàː]) is the largest of the 367 islands spanning 262.41 km^{2} (101.32 mi^{2}) that comprise the Cat Ba Archipelago, which makes up the southeastern edge of Lan Ha Bay in Northern Vietnam and maintains the dramatic and rugged features of Ha Long Bay. The archipelago has been a UNESCO Biosphere Reserve since 2004 and a part of Ha Long Bay – Cat Ba Archipelago World Heritage Site since 2023.

== History ==
Cat Ba (historically called Cac Ba) Island means "Women’s Island" (Cac meaning 'all' and 'Ba' meaning women). Legend has it that many centuries ago, three women of the Tran Dynasty were killed and their bodies floated all the way to Cat Ba Island. Each body washed up on a different beach, and local fishermen found all three. The residents of Cat Ba built a temple for each woman, and the island soon became known as Cat Ba.

Archaeological evidence suggests that people have lived on Cat Ba Island for almost 6,000 years, with the earliest settlements being found on the southeastern tip of the Island close to the area where Ben Beo harbour sits today. In 1938, a group of French archaeologists discovered human remains belonging "to the Cai Beo people of the Ha Long culture, which lived between 4,000 and 6,500 years ago… considered to be perhaps the first population group occupying the northeastern territorial waters of Vietnam… [and] the Cai Beo people may be an intermediary link between the population strata at the end of the Neolithic Age, some 4,000 years ago."

Cave Hospital

In more recent history, Cat Ba Island was primarily inhabited by Vietnamese fishermen and was largely influenced by both the French and American wars. The island was a strategic lookout point, and bombing during the wars often forced residents to hide among the Island's many caves. Today, the best reminders of the two wars have been turned into tourist attractions. Hospital Cave, which was a secret, bomb-proof hospital during the American War and as a safe house for Viet Cong leaders. This three-storey feat of engineering, in use until 1975, is only 10 km north of Cat Ba town (old). The second attraction, the newly built Cannon Fort, sits on a peak 177 meters high, offering visitors a chance to see old bunkers and helicopter landing sites, as well as views of Cat Ba Island, its coast, and the limestone karsts offshore in Lan Ha Bay.

In 1979, the third Indo-China War broke out between China and Vietnam in response to Vietnam's invasion of Cambodia that ended the reign of the Khmer Rouge. Relations between China and Vietnam collapsed, leading to the Vietnamese government evicting around 30,000 ... of the fishermen, and most of the rest of the Chinese community from the greater Ha Long area.

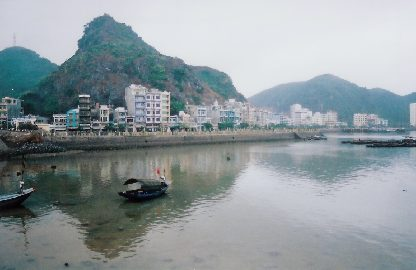
Cat Ba town (old), showing the limestone hills behind the waterfront strip

== Tourism ==
The development of infrastructure on Cat Ba in the 1990s significantly improved the island's accessibility. These developments include: the construction of larger roads; the construction of dams to build harbors and to protect Cat Ba town from flooding; the provision of consistent electricity to the island in 1997; and the introduction of daily scheduled large ferries and barges capable of transporting trucks and cars from the mainland. These developments led to a rapid increase in tourism and development in Cat Ba town (old) starting in 2001. Since then, a stop on Cat Ba Island has been included in the itinerary of many Ha Long Bay cruises, and a strip of tall, thin, five-storey budget hotels lines the seafront. Cat Ba Island receives over 350,000 visitors a year.

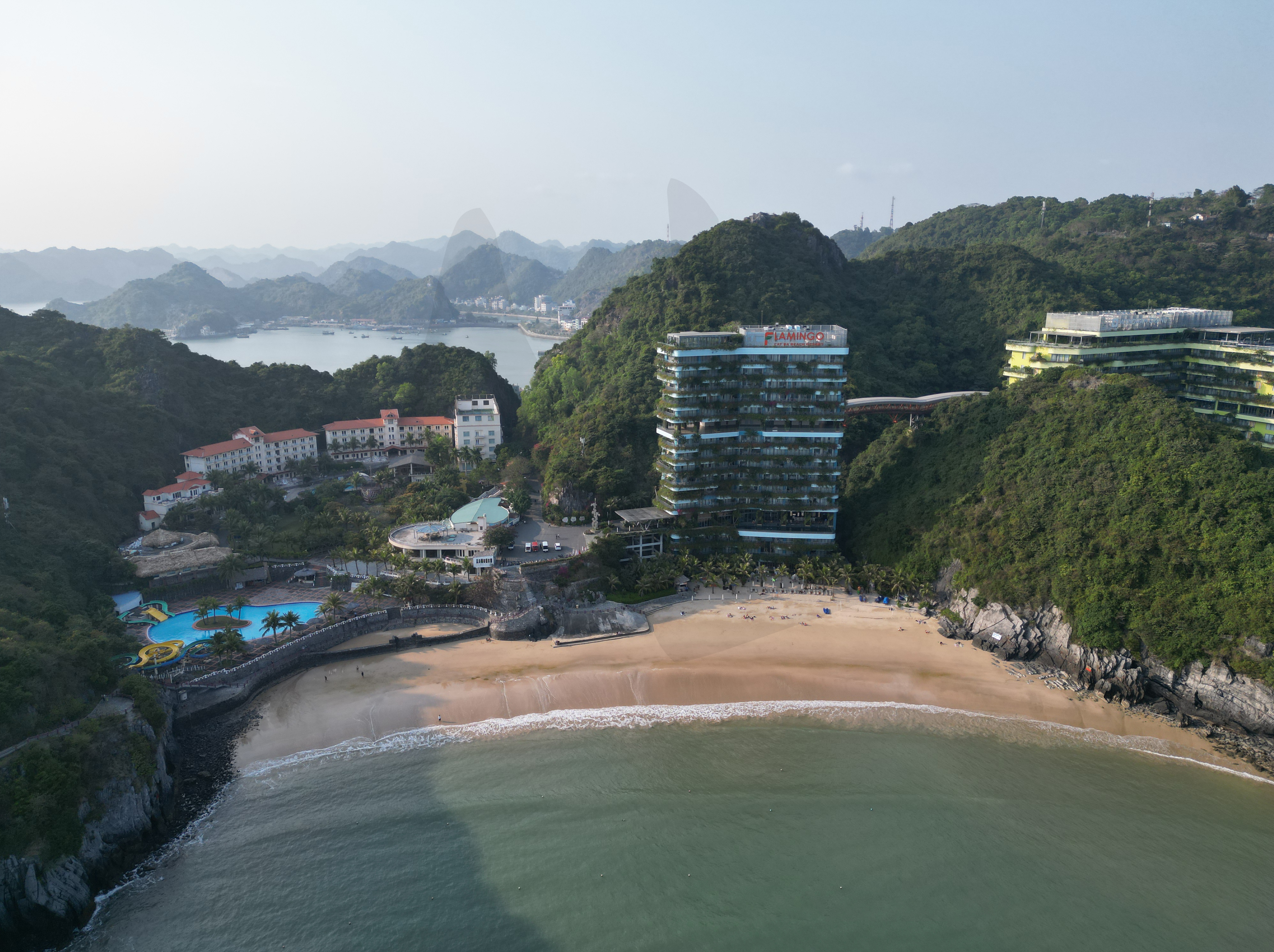
Drone shot of a Cat Co 1 beach, Cát Bà Island

Currently, over 150 hotels are listed in Cat Ba Island's tourist directory pamphlet, from cheap budget hotels to flashier upscale resorts, and construction is underway on many more.

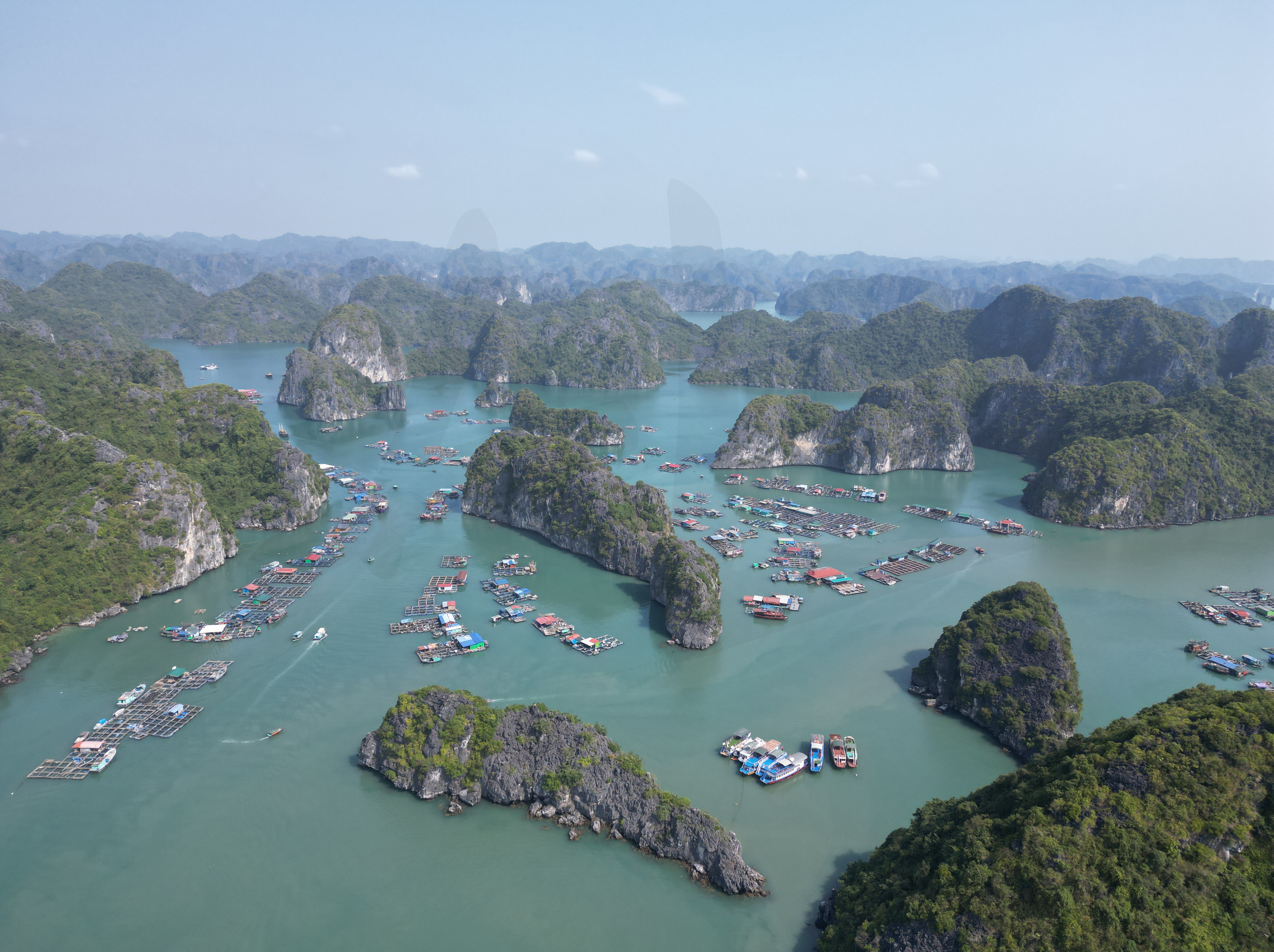
Lan Ha bay

Cat Ba Island has become the adventure-tourism capital of Vietnam, and many of the activities advertised are nature-based. Visitors can kayak and take boat cruises through Ha Long Bay and the Cat Ba Archipelago, hike through the national park, mountain bike around the Island, spend time hiking and swimming on Monkey Island just offshore. Tourists can stay at Monkey Island Resort for relaxation on a private beach, explore the Island's many caves, swim on several sandy beaches (a short walk from Cat Ba town), rock climb, and deep water solo on the limestone karsts in Lan Ha Bay. Cat Ba Island is slowly gaining popularity as an alternative to the crowded Ha Long Bay Town.

With its scenery, its association with Ha Long Bay, its proximity to cities (Haiphong, 50 km; Hanoi, 150 km), and even China, Cat Ba Island has become a major travel destination for foreign and Vietnamese visitors alike.

== Cát Bà National Park ==
At the heart of Cat Ba Island lies an ecologically diverse national park. In 1986, 9,800 [98 km^{2}] hectares (approximately one-third of the Island's total land mass) were annexed as Cát Bà National Park, the first decreed protected area in Vietnam to include a marine component (Dawkins 14). It had previously been the site of a timber company. In 2006, the boundaries of the national park were redefined, so the park contained 109 km^{2} of land area and an additional 52 km^{2} of inshore waters and mangrove-covered tidal zones (langur website). The park is staffed by 92 people, including over 60 park rangers.

View from Ngu Lam Peak, Cat Ba National Park

In 2004, Cat Ba Archipelago was declared a UNESCO Man and Biosphere Reserve to protect the multiple terrestrial and aquatic ecosystems, as well as the diverse plant and animal life found on the Island. The UNESCO designation divides the archipelago into three distinct areas, each with specific functions and restrictions that regulate development and conservation measures on the Island:

=== Core area ===
The core area needs to be legally established. It is not subject to human activity, except research and monitoring, and, as the case may be, to traditional extractive uses by local communities. Cat Ba National Park more or less constitutes the core zone of the Cat Ba Archipelago Biosphere Reserve. (8,500 hectares, of which 2,000 are marine)

=== Buffer zone ===
The buffer zone must surround or be contiguous to the core area. Activities are organized here so that they do not hinder the conservation objectives of the core area but rather help to protect it. It can be an area for experimental research, and it may accommodate education, tourism, and recreational facilities. (7,741 hectares, of which 2,800 are marine)

=== Outer transitional area ===
To provide support for research, monitoring, education, and information exchange related to local, national, and global issues of conservation and development. (10,000 hectares, of which 4,400 are marine)

=== Goals of the national park ===
The first purpose is conservation, and the park is primarily committed to protecting the nature and wildlife in the archipelago. The second purpose is scientific research, and the third purpose is to promote eco-tourism and environmental education. A fourth priority is to increase economic development in the small communities living in the buffer zones of the national park through an eco-tourism and conservation program that balances conservation and financial goals.

=== Biodiversity ===
In addition to its natural environment, the park is home to many species. There are 1,561 recorded species of flora in the park, from 186 families, including 406 woody plants, 661 medicinal plants, and 196 edible plants. The fauna on the island consists of 279 species, including 53 mammal species from 18 families, and 23 Endangered and Critically Endangered species.

There are 160 bird species, 66 species of reptiles and amphibians, and 274 species of insects from 79 different families. Aquatically, there are 900 sea fish, 178 species of coral, seven species of sea snakes, four species of sea turtles, and 21 species of seaweed found throughout the archipelago.

=== Langurs ===
The Cat Ba langur (Trachypithecus poliocephalus), or golden-headed langur, is endemic to Cat Ba Island and is one of the most endangered primates in the world. The langur population, which had been between 2,400 and 2,700, dwindled to as few as 53 in 2000 due to poaching for traditional medicine and habitat fragmentation caused by human development.

Today, there are approximately 68 langurs left in the wild. The langur population and its habitat is monitored by the Cat Ba Langur Conservation Project (CBLCP), a German-based NGO that works in close cooperation with the national park staff and the local governments on Cat Ba Island and in Hai Phong province, especially the Department of Agriculture and Rural Development in Hai Phong, to protect the langur, its habitat, and to help conserve the biodiversity and environmental integrity of the entire Cat Ba Archipelago. Difficulties the project has faced in the past and will face going forward. The CBLCP is an 'in situ' conservation project, meaning it works to protect both the langurs and their habitat (there are no plans to put the langurs in zoos). This means that by taking efforts to preserve the langurs, the CBLCP, by protecting the natural environment of the archipelago, really works to maintain all the species found there and to protect the overall health of the forest.

The biggest reason for the steep decline in langur population numbers was illegal poaching and trapping of the langurs for traditional medicinal purposes. This is a difficult trend to reverse, as langurs were being poached by local people who relied on the forest for subsistence and sold langurs to support their meagre income, and by poachers outside the Island who are part of the international illegal wildlife trade. Another major threat to the langurs is habitat fragmentation due to increased human development. Currently, the langur population is fragmented into seven isolated subpopulations at five locations on Cat Ba Island, with most langur groups small and some populations less functional for reproduction (only three groups are currently reproducing). The fragmentation of the langur population reduces genetic variability, which is already a significant problem given the langurs' small population size. It makes it impossible for some langur groups to reproduce and replace aging group members.

To address this problem, the CBLCP focused on two approaches: increasing education and awareness about the decline in the langur population and other conservation issues, and creating a protection network that relies on the local population. Both approaches take great effort and care to engage Cat Ba Island's residents, making the programs more effective. The CBLCP also takes an active approach to raising environmental awareness and education on Cat Ba Island; they strive to foster a connection between the island's citizens and the natural environment. Other mammals in the Park include civet cats and oriental giant squirrels.

== Environmental issues ==
Cat Ba Island faces numerous environmental problems. Increases in tourism and recent developments threaten the island's ecological integrity and biodiversity, reducing and fragmenting the natural habitat of Cat Ba's innumerable species. Illegal hunting and poaching, overfishing, and water pollution in Ha Long Bay continue to threaten the island's ecological health.

Many tour operators offer the option of trekking in the National Park or canoeing on three-day tours; shorter tours generally stay overnight in the small town of Cat Ba (old) (population about 8,000) or on boats moored in Cai Beo bay, about 2 km from Cat Ba town (old). Cat Ba itself is attractively situated around a bay teeming with small boats, many of which belong to pearl or shrimp farmers, and can become very busy at weekends and during public holidays. The promenade has illuminations and a large fountain which only plays after dark; it is backed by a strip of cheap hotels and bars, but dominated by the wooded limestone hills behind. The island is a national park of Vietnam and was recognized by UNESCO in December 2004 as a Biosphere reserve of the world.

Hai Phong's people committee, as well as the Vietnamese government, has cooperated with many organizations to educate local citizens to help protect the environment. They also communicate with the tourism board to promote a variety of campaigns to make Cat Ba Island greener.
