= Vĩnh Phước =

Vĩnh Phước may refer to several places in Vietnam, including:

- Vĩnh Phước ward, Cần Thơ city
- Vĩnh Phước commune, Cà Mau province.
