= Bắc Giang province =

Province of Vietnam

Bắc Giang
- Province
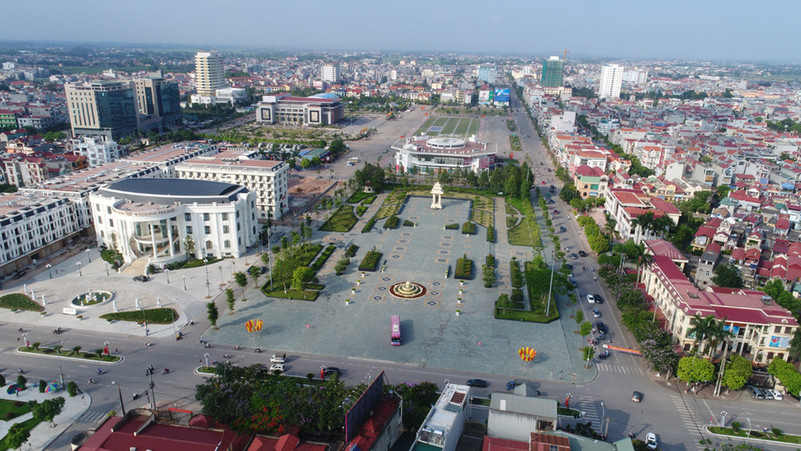
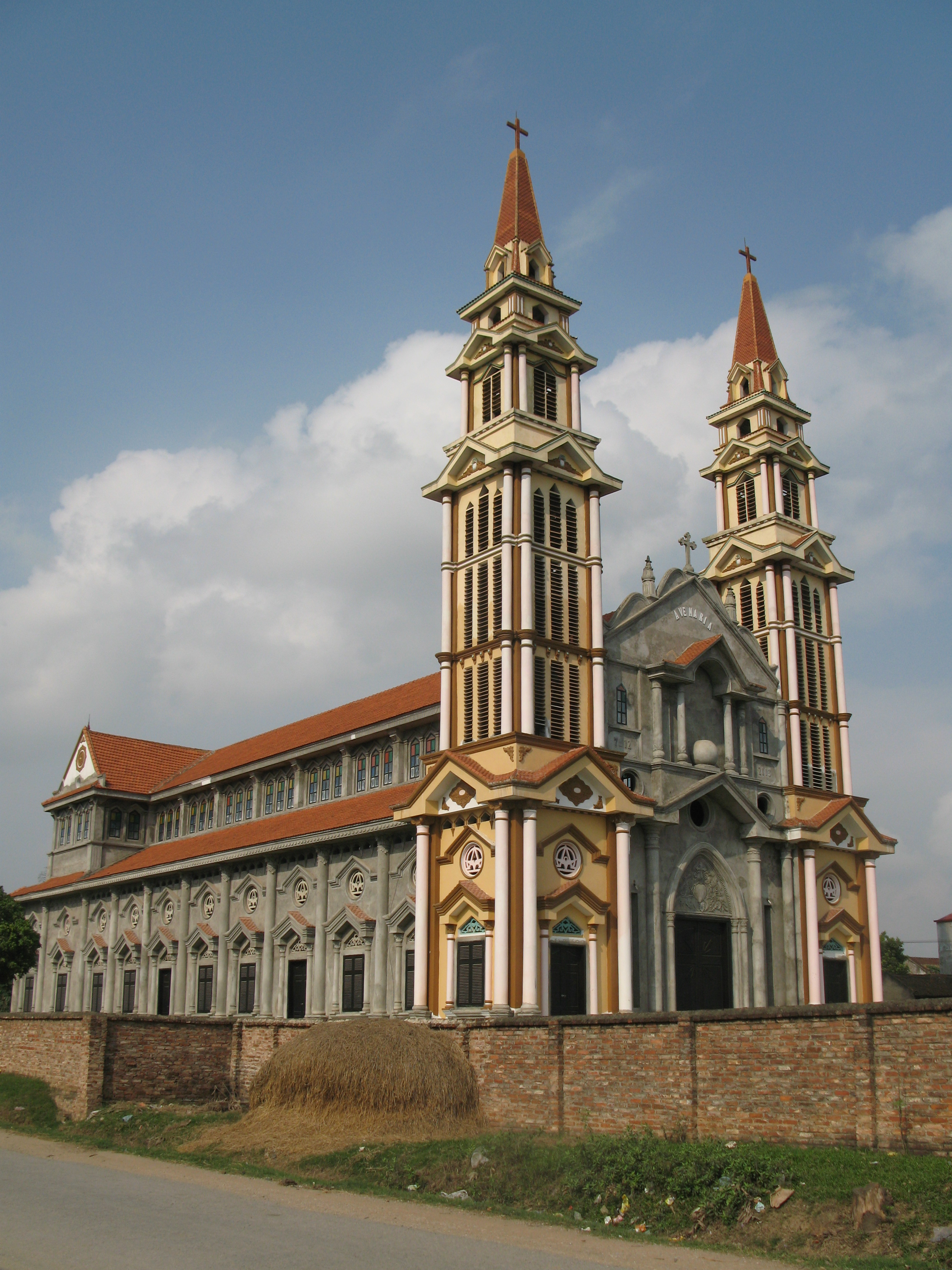
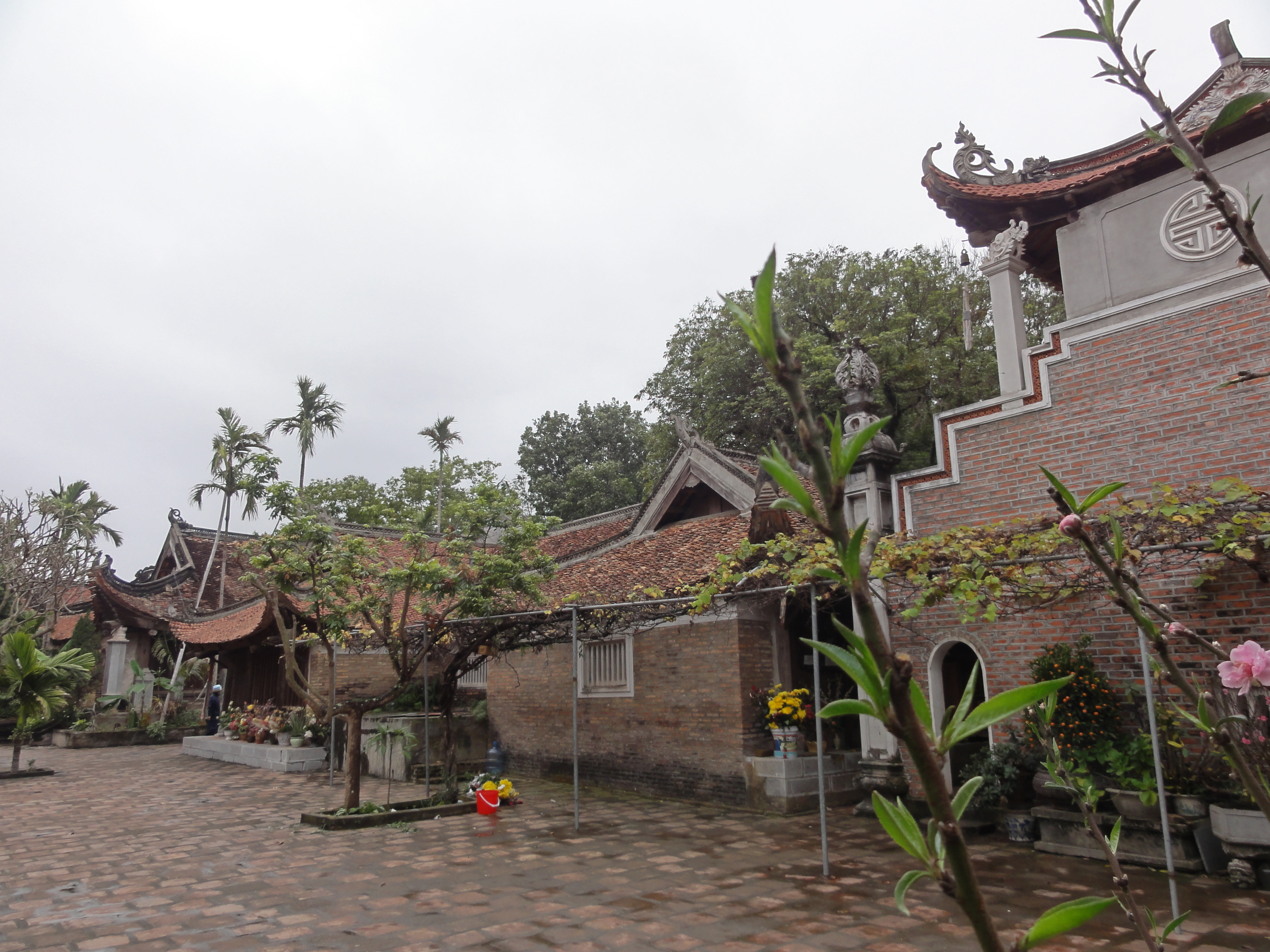
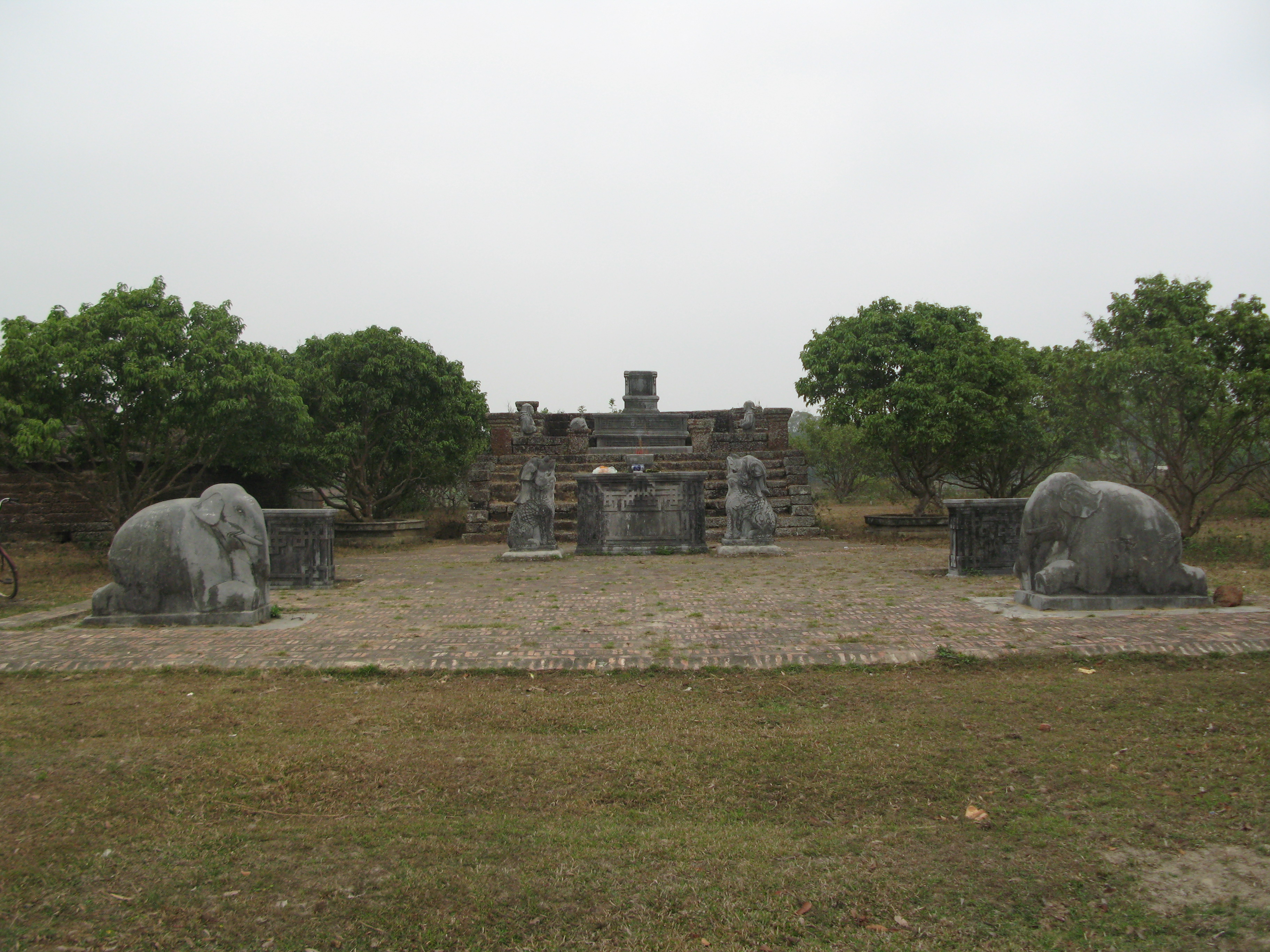
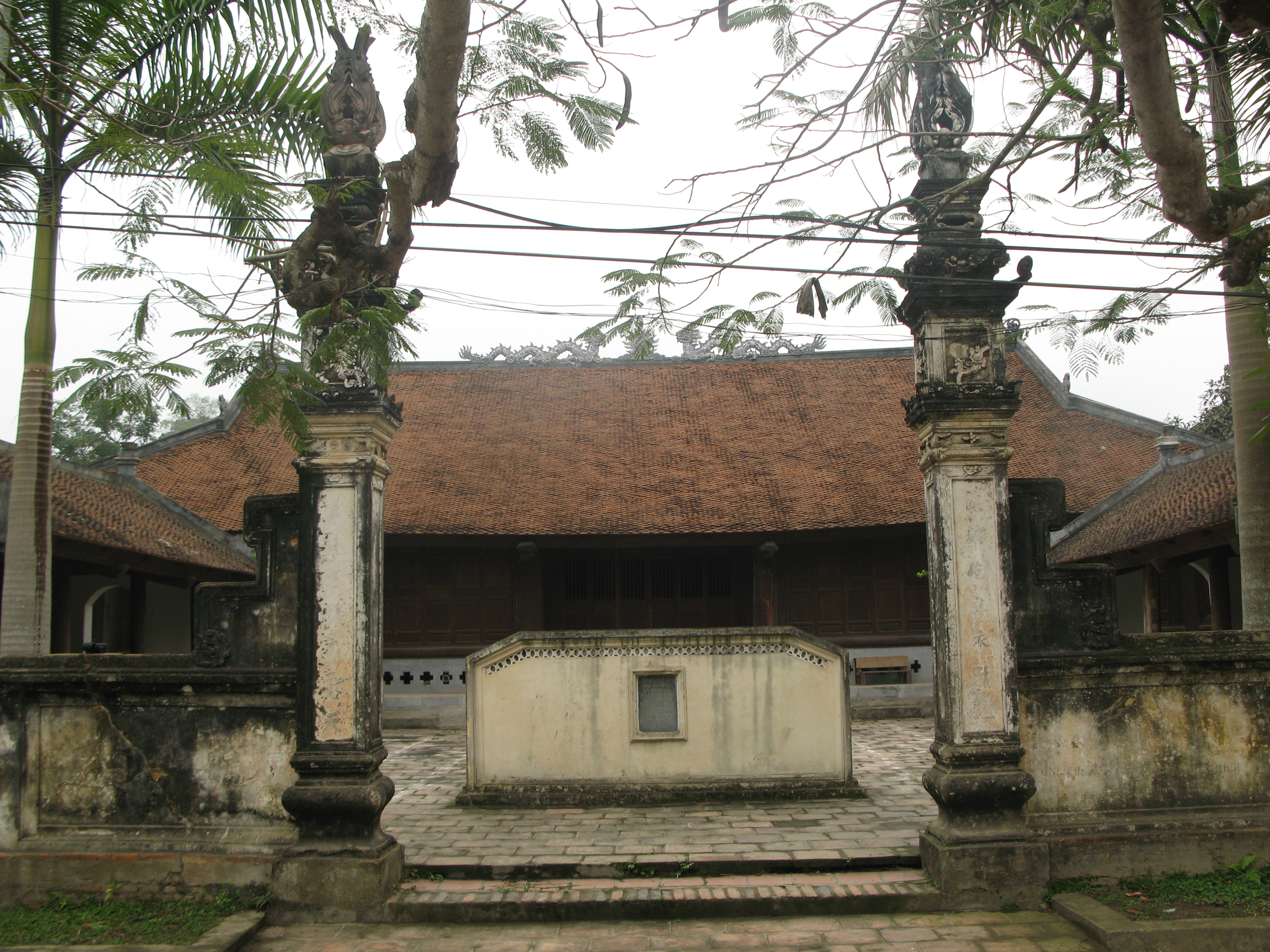
- From top, left to right : Bắc Giang downtown, Ngọc Liễn church, Vĩnh Nghiêm pagoda, Đinh Hương tomb, Vân Xuyên temple.

- Seal
- Nicknames: "Land of Lime River and Black Mountain" (Quê hương sông Lục núi Huyền) "Lycheeland" (Thủ phủ vải thiều)
- Location within Vietnam.
- Coordinates: 21°20′N 106°20′E
- Country: Vietnam
- Region: Northeast
- Capital: Bắc Giang provincial city
- Sub-division: 10 municipalities 7 rural districts

Government
  - Type: Province
  - Body: Bắc Giang Provincial People's Government
  - People Committee's Chairman: Nguyễn Việt Oanh
  - People Council's Chairman: Nguyễn Thị Hương
  - Front Committee's Chairman: Đinh Đức Cảnh
  - Party Committee's Secretary: Nguyễn Văn Gấu

Area
  - Total: 3,895.89 km^{2} (1,504.21 sq mi)

Population (2025)
  - Total: 2,057,918
  - Density: 528.228/km^{2} (1,368.10/sq mi)

GDP
  - Province: VN₫ 88.259 trillion US$ 3.773 billion
- Time zone: UTC+7 (Indochina Time)
- Area codes: 204 (Note: An official code from 2019.)
- ISO 3166 code: VN-54
- Vehicle registration: 13,98
- HDI (2020): ▲0.737 (17th)
- Website: Bacgiang.gov.vn; Bacgiang.dcs.vn

Bắc Giang was a former province in the Northeast region of Vietnam.

On June 12, 2025, Bắc Giang was incorporated into Bắc Ninh province (now Bắc Ninh city).

== History ==
It was part of Kinh Bắc (京北, "north [of] capital"), a region that included two modern provinces of Bắc Giang and Bắc Ninh. It has been posed since the Lý Dynasty to emphasize the defense factor for Thăng Long capital-citadel.

Its current name Bắc Giang (北江, "northern river") has been informed in an unofficial way since the Trần Dynasty to describe the feud of An Sinh Prince Trần Liễu, where was on the right shore of the Cầu River.

Besides, it also has another name being Lục Nam (陆南), which has been given by the French and was grafted from Lục Ngạn rural district and Lục Nam river. In particular, both names described the terrain of the province, where there were many hills (lục ngạn) with a river flowing through its south (lục nam).

=== Middle Ages ===
During the Later Lê dynasty, the province was Bắc Hà prefecture (Bắc Hà phủ). Following the ascent of the Nguyễn Dynasty, it became the prefecture of Thiên Phúc in 1822, before becoming the prefecture of Đa Phúc during the time of Emperor Tự Đức. From 5 November 1889 to 9 September 1891, there existed the province of Lục Nam. It comprised the districts of Bảo Lộc, Phượng Nhỡn, Lục Nam, Hữu Lũng (split from Lạng Giang and Bắc Ninh Province) and the rural district of Yên Bái (split from Lạng Sơn Province). In 1891 after the return of the districts of Bảo Lộc and Phượng Nhỡn back to Bắc Ninh province, Lục Nam was abolished and integrated into Đạo Quan Binh I (the 1st Infantry Regiment).

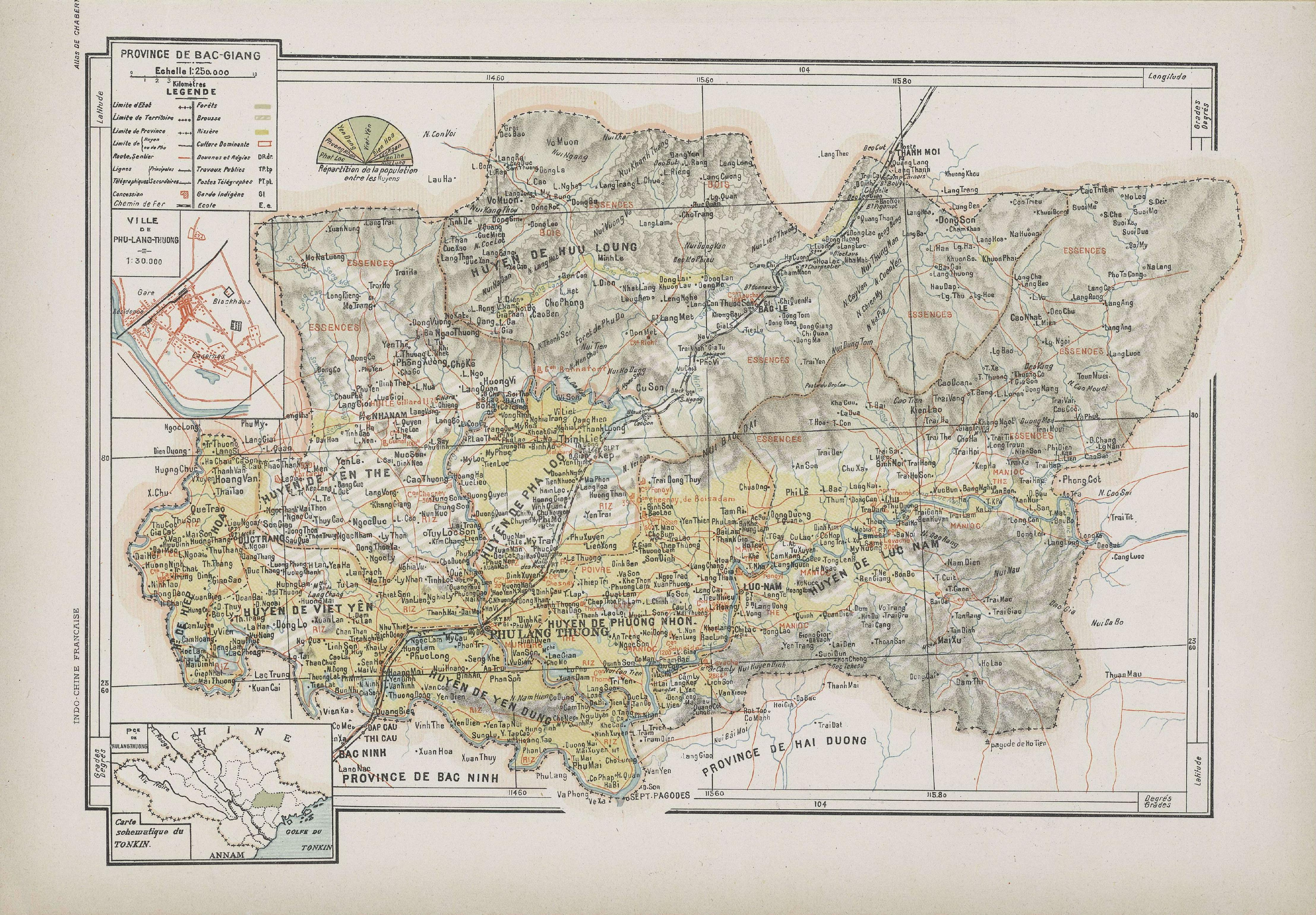
Map of Bac Giang province in 1909.

The modern province of Bắc Giang was founded on 10 October 1895, when it was created out of Bắc Ninh Province. It initially comprised the prefectures of Lạng Giang and Đa Phúc and the districts of Kim Anh, Yên Dũng, Phượng Nhỡn, Việt Yên, Hiệp Hòa, Yên Thế and some small territories south of Lục Nam River. The province capital was Phủ Lạng Thương, which is now the city of Bắc Giang. In 1896, the prefecture of Đa Phúc and the Kim Anh District was returned to Bắc Ninh Province.

=== XX century ===
In March 1945, Japanese troops conducted multiple massacres of French prisoners of war in Bắc Giang province. Immediately after the surrender of the Bắc Giang garrison, they bayoneted 45 prisoners of war to death; four badly wounded men survived. On 11 March 22 prisoners were killed on the banks of the Cầu River. Thirteen more were killed in a similar fashion two days later. On 14 March, 14 French prisoners were executed behind a church.

In 1950, during the Democratic Republic of Vietnam, Bắc Giang was put into the Confederation of Northern Vietnam (Vietnamese: Liên khu Việt Bắc) by the communist Việt Minh and comprised seven districts: Hiệp Hòa, Lục Ngạn, Yên Thế, Lạng Giang, Việt Yên, Yên Dũng, Hữu Lũng. On 22 February 1955, the Sơn Động district (Quảng Yên province) was incorporated into Bắc Giang province. On 1 July 1956, upon the formation of the Autonomous Region of Việt Bắc (Vietnamese: Khu tự trị Việt Bắc), the Hữu Lũng district was transferred to Lạng Sơn province. On 21 January 1957, the districts of Sơn Động and Lục Ngạn were divided into the three districts of Sơn Động, Lục Ngạn and Lục Nam. On 27 October 1962, Bắc Giang merged with Bắc Ninh into the new Hà Bắc province, until it was re-partitioned on 1 January 1997 into its previous components.

=== XXI century ===
Currently, Bắc Giang province situated 50 kilometres (31 mi) to the east of Hanoi, it covers 3,895.89 km^{2} (1,504.21 mi^{2}), and, as of 2024, its population was 1,962,600 people.

The province lies in the Red River Delta and is bordered by Quảng Ninh to the east, Lạng Sơn to the north, Thái Nguyên and the urban district of Sóc Sơn in the capital Hanoi to the west, and Bắc Ninh and Hải Dương to the south.

On 12 June 2025, as part of major nationwide reforms, Bắc Giang province was dissolved and merged with Bắc Ninh province.

== Geography ==
Bắc Giang lies in the Red River Delta. It borders Quảng Ninh to the east, Lạng Sơn to the north, Thái Nguyên and the urban district of Sóc Sơn in the capital Hanoi to the west, and Bắc Ninh and Hải Dương to the south. It comprises three land forms namely, the lowland or delta land, the midland and the mountainous region. While the midland areas are in the districts of Hiệp Hoà and Việt Yên, and the city of Bắc Giang, the mountainous districts are the Sơn Động, Lục Ngạn, Yên Thế, Tân Yên, Yên Dũng and Lạng Giang; the seven mountainous districts account for 72% of the area of Bắc Giang province.

Of the total land area of the province, 123,000 hectares (300,000 acres) is agricultural land, 110,000 hectares (270,000 acres) is forest land, 66,500 hectares (164,000 acres) is residential and urban land and for other uses. The farmland in the province is good for intensive farming of rice, vegetable, and fruit crops, and bulb trees. There is scope for expanding land under forests. The produce from the forests has been estimated as 3.5 million m^{3} of wood and 500 million trees of bamboo and neohouzeaua.

Bắc Giang occupies an area of 3,827.45 square kilometres (1,477.79 mi^{2}), which is 1.2% of the area of the whole country. According to statistics from 2000, 32.4% of the land is used for agriculture, while 28.9% is used for forestry, industry or is otherwise uncleared. The remainder comprises mountains, unexploited waterways and land used for miscellaneous purposes. The province is 50 kilometres (31 mi) from Hanoi and has a good network of roads such as the National Highways No. 1A, 31 and 279. It has railway lines from Bắc Giang to Hanoi, Lạng Sơn, Thái Nguyên, and mineral areas in Quảng Ninh by train.

The terrain is moderately mountainous, lying between the high mountains to the north and the Red River Delta to the south. Although a large part of the terrain is mountainous most of it is not isolated. The region to the northern end of the province is mountainous uncleared forest. To the east and southeast of the province is Đông Triều and Mount Yên Tử, located within the Yên Tử Nature Reserve. The elevation of the province is mostly in the 300–900 metres (980–2,950 ft) range, with a maximum of 1,068 metres (3,504 ft) (Mount Yên Tử). To the northeastern end of the province, along the border with Quảng Ninh there is the Khe Rỗ forest, spanning 71.53 km^{2}, with a rich biodiversity.

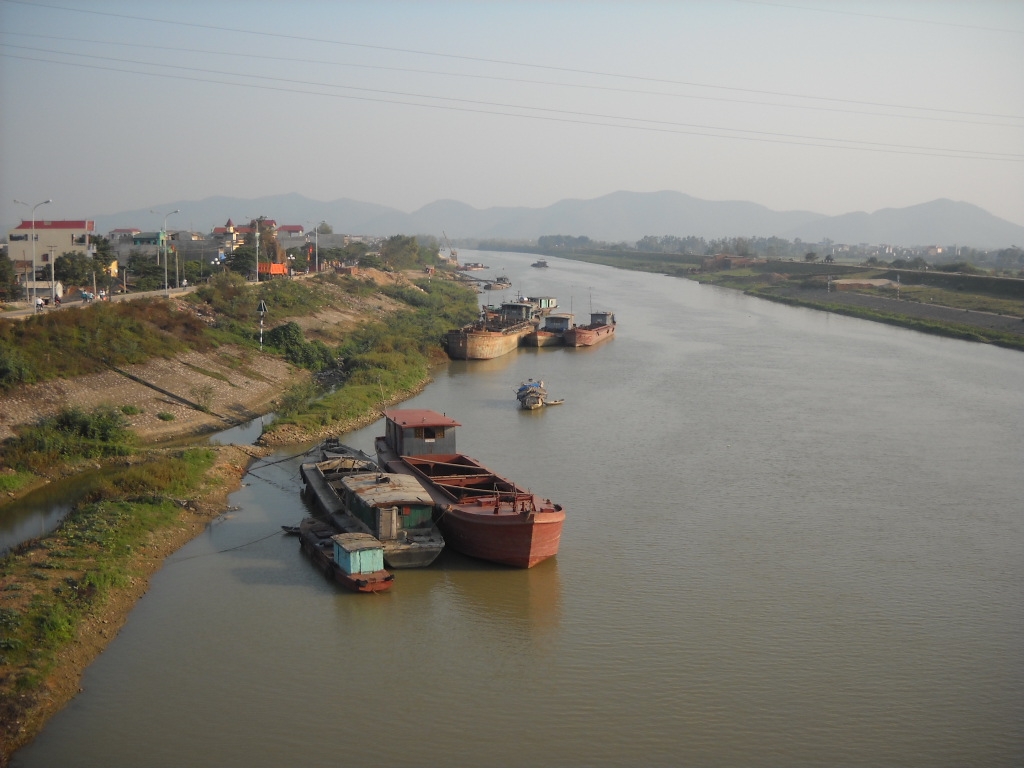
Cầu River, Việt Yên district.

Bắc Giang has a total of 347 km of rivers and springs, the three most prominent rivers are the Lục Nam, the Thương and the Cầu. Apart from waterways, Bắc Giang has many lakes, including Cấm Sơn Lake and Khuôn Thần Lake; the area covered by ponds, lakes and lagoons is 16,300 hectares (40,000 acres).Cấm Sơn Lake lies in the district of Lục Ngạn, which borders Lạng Sơn Province. It is 30 kilometres (19 mi) long and has a width varying from 200 metres (660 ft) up to 7 kilometres (4.3 mi). It has an area of 26 square kilometres (10 mi^{2}), but this can increase to 30 kilometres (19 mi) during monsoonal flooding. Khuôn Thần Lake has an area of 2.4 square kilometres (0.93 mi^{2}) and the centre of the lake has five small hilly islands surrounded by 20-year-old pine forests. Pedal and motor boating are both permitted on the lake. Ethnic minority hamlets are located on the shores of the lake. Approach route to the lake is from Bắc Ninh - 31 kilometres (19 mi), then to Bắc Giang - 51 kilometres (32 mi)), further to the Hoà River - 98 kilometres (61 mi) and finally arrive at Cấm Sơn Lake. The highest flow in the Thương River is reported to be 64.4 m^{3}/s and lowest flow is 12.9 m^{3}/s.

=== Climate ===
The province has the dominant characteristics of the tropical, temperate climate zone of the Northern Plain. The temperature, humidity and rainfall vary over months and seasons. The climate in the province has been discerned in two distinct seasons - the hot, rainy season from May to September and the cold, dry season from November to March. The average temperature varies between 22–23 °C (72–73 °F); the maximum temperature recorded was 41 °C (106 °F) while the lowest temperature was 13 °C (55 °F). Humidity values are in the range of 73% to 87%. The average rainfall is reported to be 1,953 millimetres (76.9 in). The annual sunshine hours of 1,500 to 1,700 hours is good to grow tropical and subtropical trees. The average wind velocity is 2.1 metres per second (6.9 ft/s) and the average atmosphere pressure is 757.71 mmHg. Since the province is located away from Vietnam's eastern coast and the South China Sea (East Sea), the incidence of hurricanes and storms is rare, although whirlwinds and hailstorms are a localised phenomenon in a few mountainous districts.

=== Minerals ===
Bắc Giang had 63 registered mines in 2005 involved in mining 15 types of minerals such as coal, metal, industrial minerals, building materials. Important mines are the coal mines in Yên Thế, Lục Ngạn and Sơn Động districts, which have coal reserves of about 114 million tonnes (including anthracite, lean-coal, peat-coal); Dong Ri mine has 107.3 million tonnes that has potential for a large scale industrial development. Iron ore reserves (0,5 million tonnes) have been found in the Yên Thế district. Bronze ore reserves (100,000 tonnes) have been found in Lục Ngạn and Sơn Động districts. Three million tonnes of Kaolin reserves have been located in Yên Dũng. Large reserves of clay (360 million m3) are concentrated in Việt Yên, Lang Giang, Lục Nam, Yên Thế, and Hiệp Hoà districts, about 100 m3 are used to make fire-bricks. Gravel and conglomerates are in Hiệp Hoà and Lục Nam districts.

=== Avifauna ===
A joint survey of the multi-taxa inventory conducted in the Bắc Giang province by the Centre for Biodiversity and Conservation at the American Museum of Natural History, New York (CBC-AMNH) and the Institute for Ecology and Biological Resources, Hanoi (IEBR) has recorded 146 species of birds, including 61 species from Khau Rịa and Mt Pu Tha Ca and 105 species from Mt Tây Côn Lĩnh.

=== Demographics ===
According to the General Statistics Office of the Government of Vietnam, the population of Bắc Giang province as of 2016 was 1,657,600 with a density of 430 persons per km^{2} over a total land area of 3,827.45 square kilometres (1,477.79 mi^{2}) of the province. The male population during this period was 790,300, with females accounting for 838,100. The rural population was 1,473,000 against an urban population of 153,400.

According to the census of 1 April 2009, the population was 1,555,720 with a density of 407 people/km^{2}, 1.7 times the national average. There are 26 ethnic groups in the province - of these, ethnic Kinh comprised 88.1%, followed by Nùng people with 4.5%, Tày with 2.6%; Sán Chay people and Sán Dìu people, both with 1.6%, Hoa 1.2% and Dao people 0.5%.

=== Administration ===
Bắc Giang is subdivided into 10 district-level sub-divisions :

- 1 provincial city:
  - Bắc Giang (capital)
- 2 town:
  - Việt Yên
  - Chũ
- 7 districts:
  - Hiệp Hòa
  - Lạng Giang
  - Lục Nam
  - Lục Ngạn
  - Sơn Động
  - Tân Yên
  - Yên Thế

They are further subdivided into 16 commune-level towns (or townlets), 207 communes, and 7 wards.

| Local government divisions | Division type | Population (2016) | Area (km^{2}) | Towns (huyện lỵ or thị trấn) (bold) and communes (xã) |
|---|---|---|---|---|
| Bắc Giang | City (thành phố) | 185,000 | 66.77 | Wards (phường): Trần Phú, Ngô Quyền, Lê Lợi, Hoàng Văn Thụ, Mỹ Độ, Trần Nguyên Hãn, Thọ Xương. Communes (xã): Dĩnh Kế, Xương Giang, Đa Mai, Song Mai. |
| Việt Yên | town (thị xã) | 181,034 | 171.4 | Bích Động (capital), Nếnh, Quang Châu, Ninh Sơn, Tiên Sơn, Trung Sơn, Nghĩa Trung, Hồng Thái, Tăng Tiến, Quảng Minh, Vân Hà, Vân Trung, Việt Tiến, Thượng Lan, Minh Đức, Tự Lạn, Hương Mai. |
| Hiệp Hòa District | District (huyện) | 237,900 | 201 | Thắng, Bắc Lý, Châu Minh, Đại Thành, Danh Thắng, Đoan Bái, Đông Lỗ, Đồng Tân, Đức Thắng, Hòa Sơn, Hoàng An, Hoàng Lương, Hoàng Thanh, Hoàng Vân, Hợp Thịnh, Hùng Sơn, Hương Lâm, Lương Phong, Mai Đình, Mai Trung, Ngọc Sơn, Quang Minh, Thái Sơn, Thanh Vân, Thường Thắng, Xuân Cẩm. |
| Lạng Giang District | District (huyện) | 191,048 | 246 | Kép, Dĩnh Trì, Thái Đào, Đại Lâm, Tân Dĩnh, Xương Lâm, Tân Hưng, Hương Sơn, Xuân Hương, Mỹ Thái, Phi Mô, Tân Thanh, Mỹ Hà, Tiên Lục, Đào Mỹ, An Hà, Tân Thịnh, Hương Lạc, Nghĩa Hưng, Nghĩa Hòa, Quang Thịnh, Dương Đức, Yên Mỹ. |
| Lục Nam District | District (huyện) | 202,886 | 597 | Đồi Ngô (capital), Lục Sơn, Bình Sơn, Trường Sơn, Vô Tranh, Trường Giang, Nghĩa Phương, Huyền Sơn, Bắc Lũng, Cẩm Lý, Vũ Xá, Đan Hội, Yên Sơn, Lan Mẫu, Phương Sơn, Thanh Lâm, Chu Điện, Bảo Đài, Bảo Sơn, Tam Dị, Đông Phú, Đông Hưng, Tiên Nha, Khám Lạng. |
| Lục Ngạn District | District (huyện) | 204,416 | 1012 | Chũ, Cấm Sơn, Tân Sơn, Phong Vân, Sa Lý, Phong Minh, Sơn Hải, Hộ Đáp, Trung tâm huấn luyện Cấm Sơn, Kim Sơn, Biên Sơn, Kiên Lao, Thanh Hai, Kiên Thành, Giáp Sơn, Tân Hoà, Biển Động, Tân Hoa, Tân Quang, Hồng Giang, Trù Hựu, Quý Sơn, Phượng Sơn, Mỹ An, Tân Mộc, Đèo Gia, Phỉ Điền, Đồng Cốc, Phú Nhuận, Nghĩa Hò, Tân Quang, Tân Lập, Nam Dương. |
| Sơn Động District | District (huyện) | 68,724 | 845.77 | An Châu (the capital), Thanh Sơn, Hữu Sản, An Lạc, Vân Sơn, Lệ Viễn, Vĩnh Khương, An Lập, Dương Hưu, Long Sơn, An Châu, An Bá, Yên Định, Tuấn Đạo, Bồng Am, Thanh Luận, Cẩm Đàn, Giáo Liêm, Chiên Sơn, Quế Sơn, Phúc Thắng, Thạch Sơn, Tuấn Mậu. |
| Tân Yên District | District (huyện) | 161,835 | 203.7 | Cao Thượng (capital), Nhã Nam, Quế Nham, Việt Lập, Liên Chung, Cao Xá, Ngọc Lý, Ngọc Thiện, Ngọc Châu, Ngọc Vân, Hợp Đức, Phúc Hòa, Tân Trung, An Dương, Lan Giới, Nhã Nam, Đại Hóa, Quang Tiến, Phúc Sơn, Lam Cốt, Việt Ngọc, Song Vân, Liên Sơn. |
| Yên Dũng District | District (huyện) | 135,075 | 185.9 | Neo (capital), Tân Dân, Đồng Phúc, Đồng Việt, Tư Mại, Đức Giang, Tiến Dũng, Cảnh Thụy, Lãng Sơn, Trí Yên, Lão Hộ, Tân An, Xuân Phú, Tân Tiến, Tân Liễu, Tiền Phong, Yên Lư, Hương Gián, Quỳnh Sơn, Tân Mỹ, Song Khê, Nội Hoàng, Đồng Sơn, Nham Sơn, Thắng Cương. |
| Yên Thế District | District (huyện) | 102,574 | 301 | Cầu Gồ (capital), Bố Hạ, Đồng Vương, Canh Nậu, Đồng Kỳ, Bố Hạ, Hương Vĩ, Đông Sơn, Xuân Lương, Tam Tiến, Tiến Thắng, Tân Hiệp, Tam Hiệp, An Thượng, Phồn Xương, Đồng Lạc, Hồng Kỳ, Đồng Hưu, Tân Sỏi, Đồng Tiến, Đồng Tâm. |

== Culture ==
=== Tourism ===
Bắc Giang has many locations of interest to visitors. It has several monuments such as the Khe Rỗ Primitive Forest, Xương Giang, the Ancient Citadel, Cấm Sơn Lake, Đức La Pagoda and Thọ Hà Communal House.

Khe Rỗ Primitive Forest

Khe Rỗ Primitive Forest, a virgin primitive forest is located in An Lạc commune, Sơn Động District. The forest is a protected and covers an area of 7,153 hectares (17,680 acres). The forest has rich biodiversity of flora and fauna. 236 species of trees, 255 tubers of valuable medical plants, 37 mammals, 73 species of birds and 18 species of reptiles (7 are considered rare and valuable) have been recorded in the forest. Many streams flow through the forest area. The An Lạc commune has a newly developed Ecotourism program running out of several homestays to help preserve and share the cultural heritage of local ethnic minorities. Local families host visitors and prepare authentic dishes for them. Tours through the forest, passed waterfalls and lakes, and treks up Khau Tron Peak are available through local guides. CSDS (Center for Sustainable Development Studies), a non-profit NGO in Hanoi in conjunction with other organisations assists the locals to develop sustainable lifestyles through ecotourism.

Đức La Pagoda

The Đức La pagoda, located in the Trí Yên commune of Yên Dung district, was built in the 12th century and is well preserved. It was then the centre of the "Trúc Lâm Trinity" (King Trần Nhân Tông, Pháp Loa and Huyền Quang monks) who established a school of Buddhist preaching and founded the Trúc Lâm religious sect. The pagoda is set in the backdrop of the Co Tien Mountain range at the Phuong Nhon confluence. The pagoda is surrounded by an expanse of rice-fields, amidst villages and hamlets around green bamboo groves. The "99 Nham Bien Mountain range" is seen at a distance. The pagoda is built on a south-west axis and has four principal zones. The first zone has the Ho and Thieu Huong Buddhist pagodas. There are two Thap Dien niches where very large statues of Thien Wong, Dia Tang and Long Than are installed. The Thien Huong Palace, adjacent to this, is an exquisite structure, which has three horizontal panels and a gilded door. The first chamber of Buddha is the architectural legacy of the Lê dynasty. The second zone is separated from the first zone by a brick yard. Within this zone is a simple building built with wooden planks and decorated with natural scenes of sky and clouds. It is the first ancestral shrine, and a panel here has the inscription "Trúc Lâm ho thuong" (A rendezvous of the Trúc Lâm Trinity) in Chinese characters. This inscription is engraved above the three statues of the Trúc Lâm Trinity. The third zone has the two-roofed bell tower. The fourth zone is another ancestral shrine with two statues made in the architectural style of the Nguyễn dynasty. The Đức La pagoda is also an important training centre of Buddhism. The pagoda also has wooden printing blocks of Buddhist sutras.

Thổ Hà Communal Hall

The Thổ Hà Communal Hall, located in Thổ Hà village, Việt Yên district, was built during the reign of Emperor Lê Hy Tông. It was built in the form of the Chinese character cong and it is known as "the praise-giving house". It is built over a raised ground and is 27 metres (89 ft) long and 16 metres (52 ft) wide and approached from all sides by three grey stone steps. The roofs of the Communal House has an ancient crescent-shaped tiled roof that curves up like a scimitar sword blade. At the four corners, decorated with purple-burned glazed terra-cotta creatures of lion cubs are depicted. It has 22 levels engraved with dragons, clouds, and lion cubs. The communal house has 7 rooms built on 48 ironwood pillars. The roof frame is decorated with engravings of "ladies in long dresses wearing their hair in buns or turbans, riding phoenixes and dragons or dancing over the floating clouds". Polished blue stones decorate the floor of the house. It has a wooden entrance engraved and painted in gold which gives it an ancient ambience. There is also an inscription on a stone, which says that the Tho Ha Communal Hall was built out of contributions from local villagers.

ATK2

ATK is an abbreviation of "An Toàn Khu", which means "safe zone". It was primarily built by the Việt Minh guerrillas during the war, in the period 1965–1972, against the Americans. This zone consists of a network of tunnels as defense works against any army attacks by bombs and guns. This has now been developed as a historical monument.

Other sights

Other sights of interest in the province are: The Museum dedicated to Hoàng Hoa Thám and Đồn Phồn Xương in Yên Thế District; the Dinh Hương Tomb in Đức Thắng commune, Hiệp Hòa District, burial place of La Quý Hầu, a Lê dynasty noble and army officer; the historical region of Suối Mỡ and Đền Suối Mỡ in Lục Nam District; the Đức La Temple in Yên Dũng District; the ancient fort of Xương Giang; and the Cây Dã tree, believed to be more than 1000 years old, located in Tiên Lục commune, Lạng Giang District. Eight people are required to hold hands to span this tree's circumference.

=== Landmarks ===
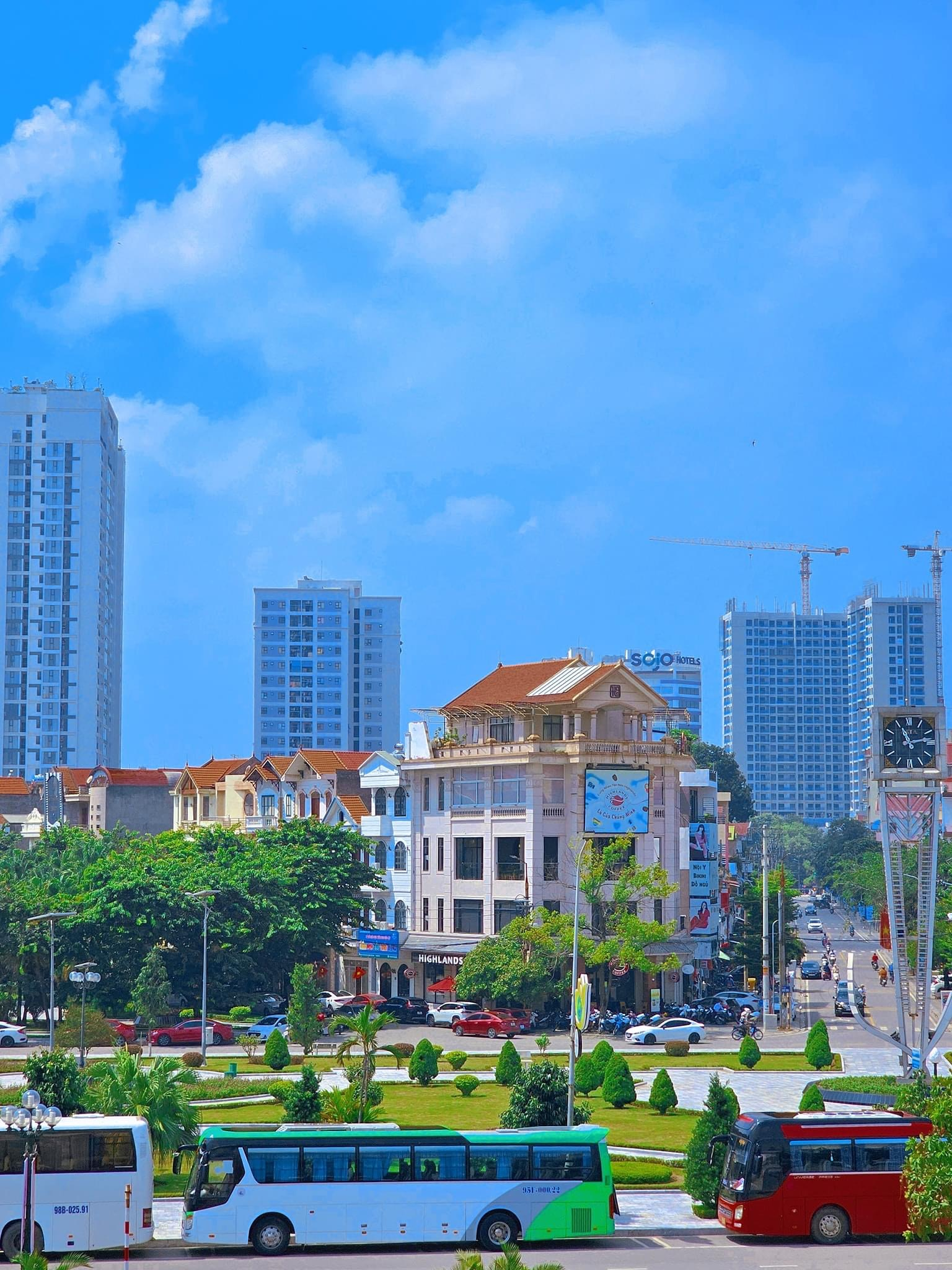
Bắc Giang city

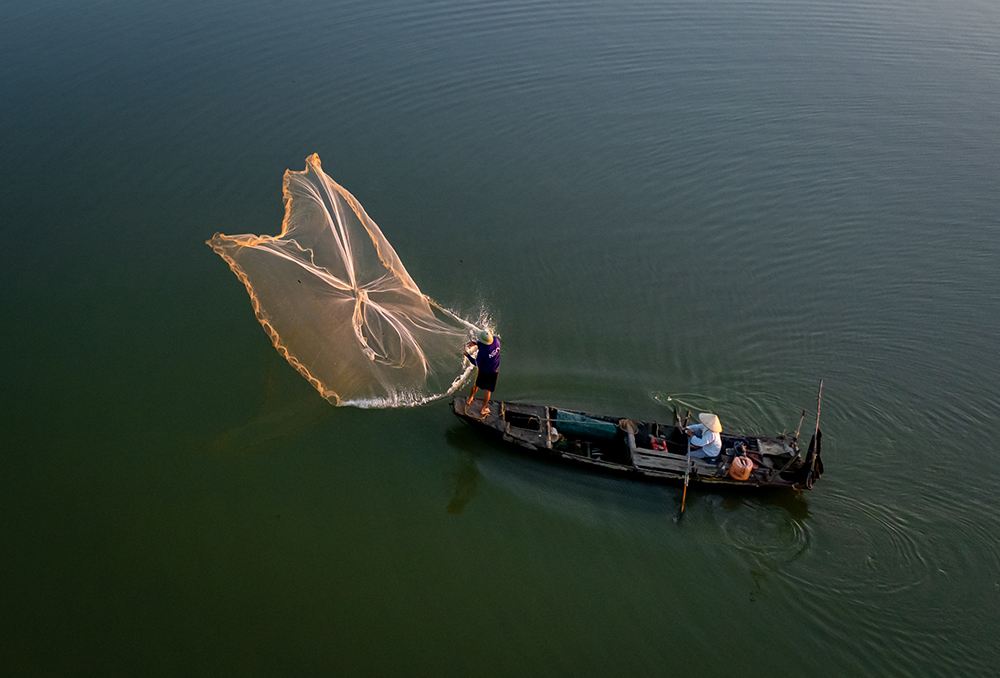
Fishing on the Thương River

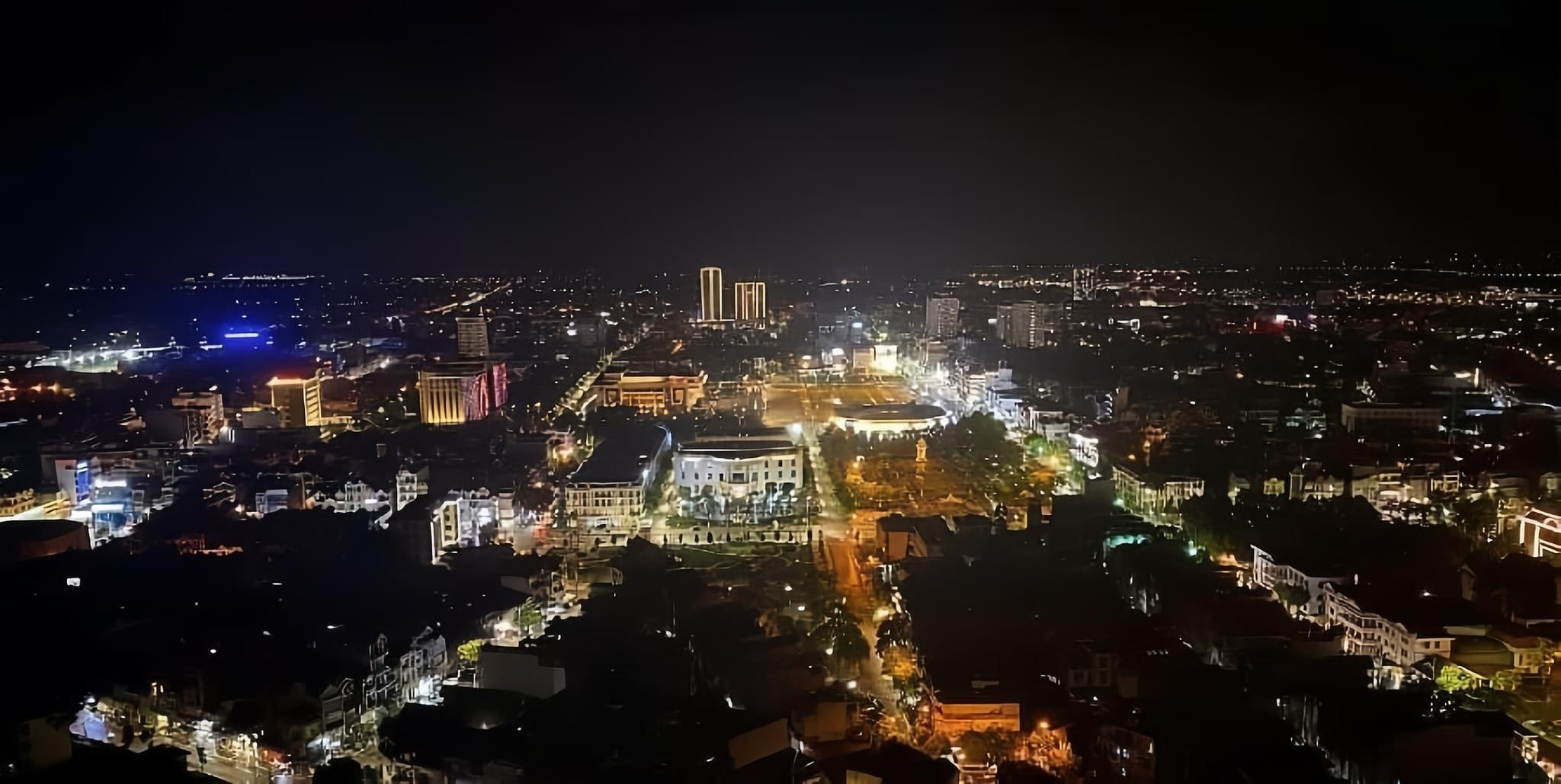
Bắc Giang at night

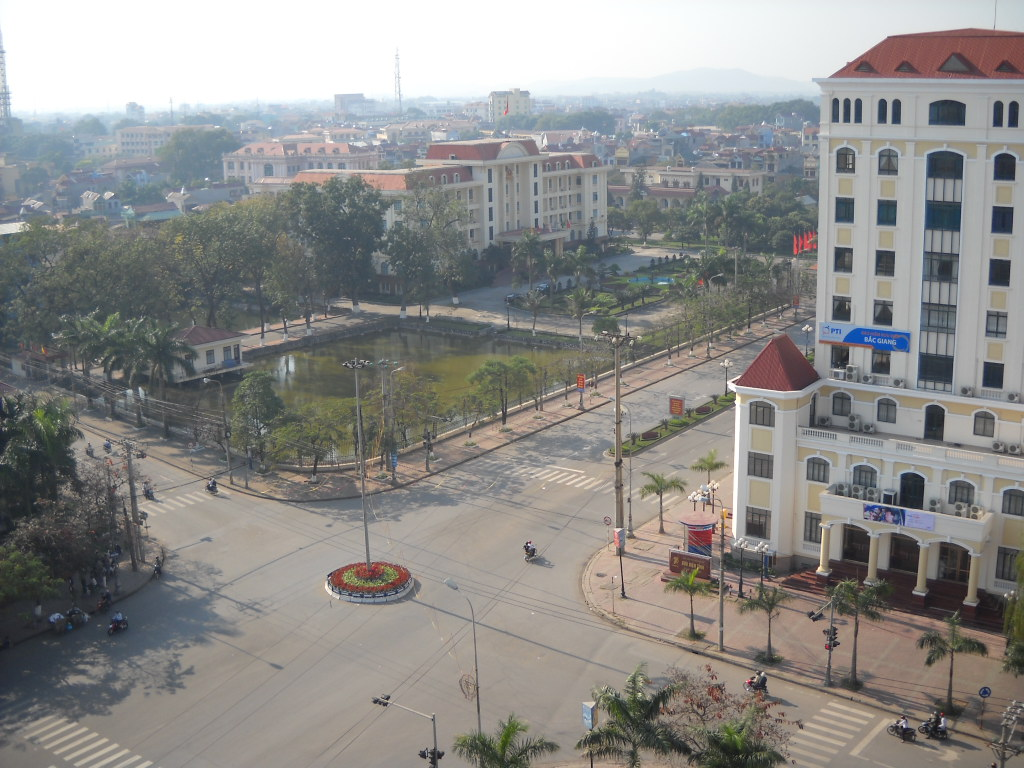
Bắc Giang

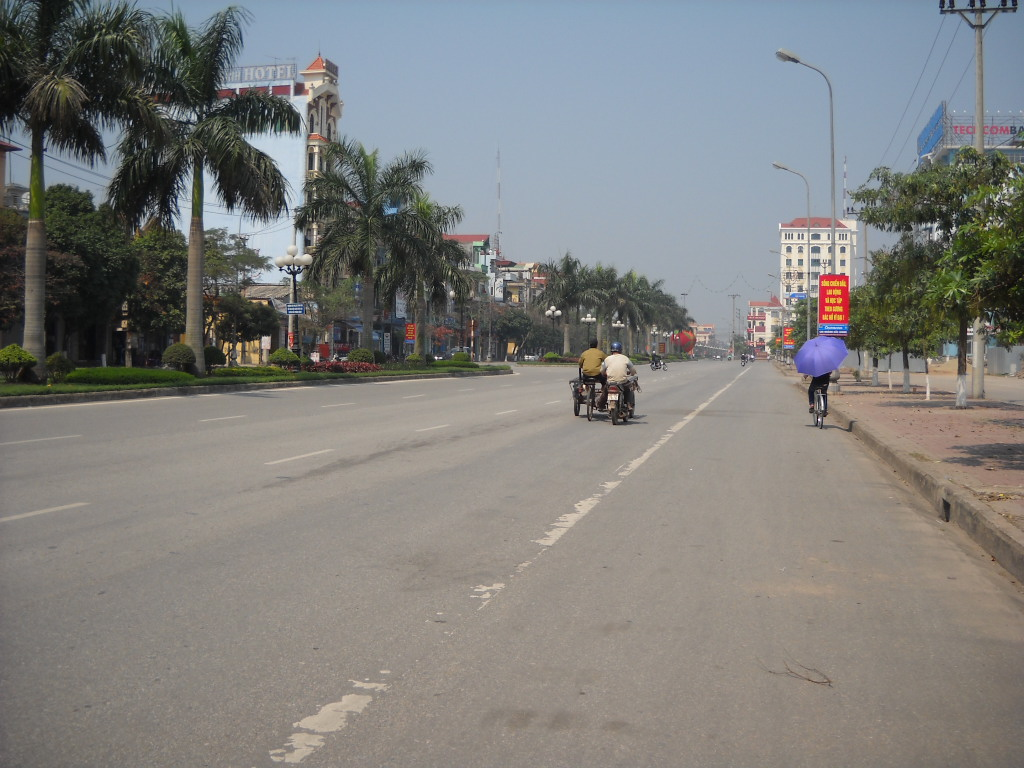
Bắc Giang

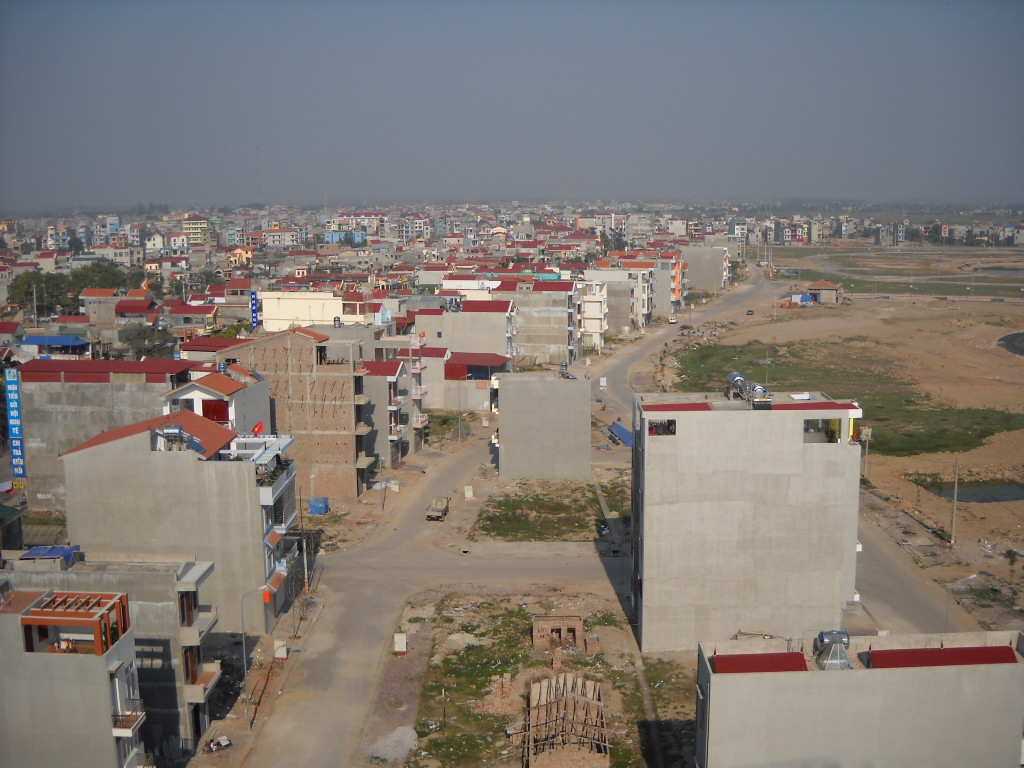
Bắc Giang

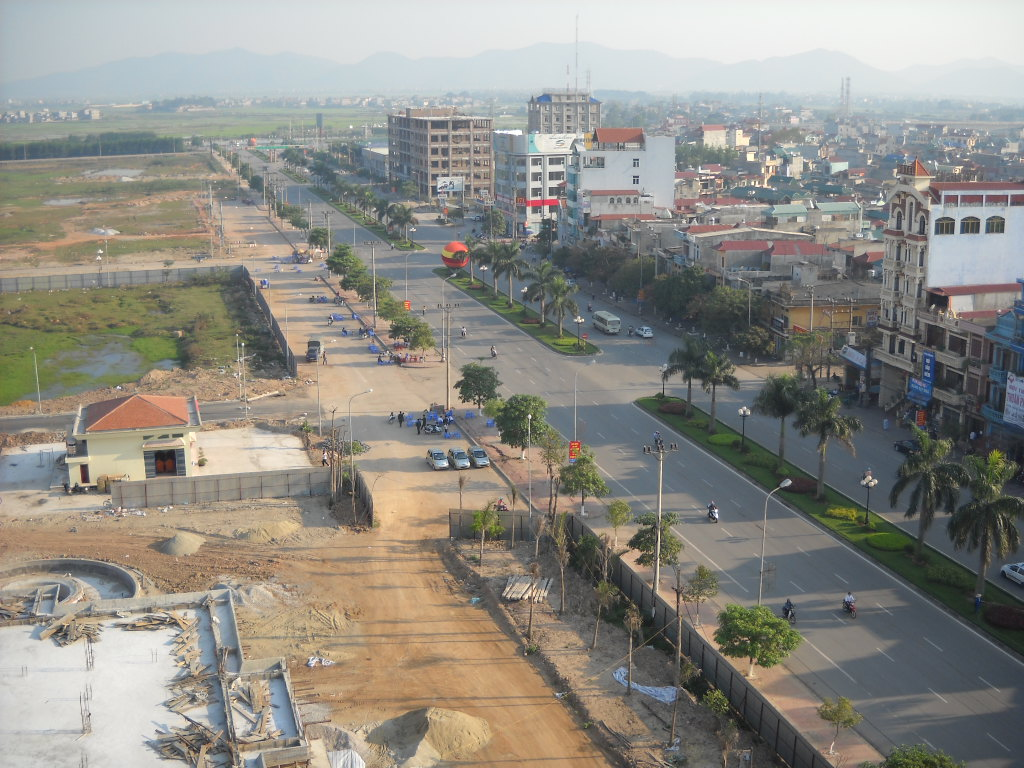
Bắc Giang

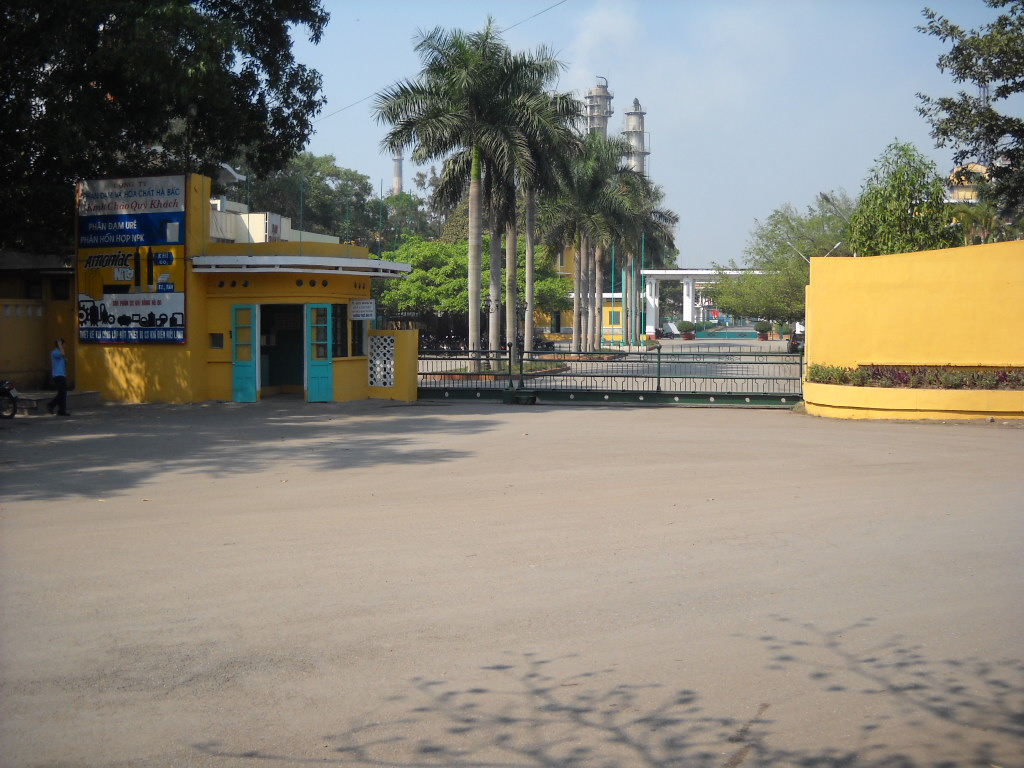
Bắc Giang

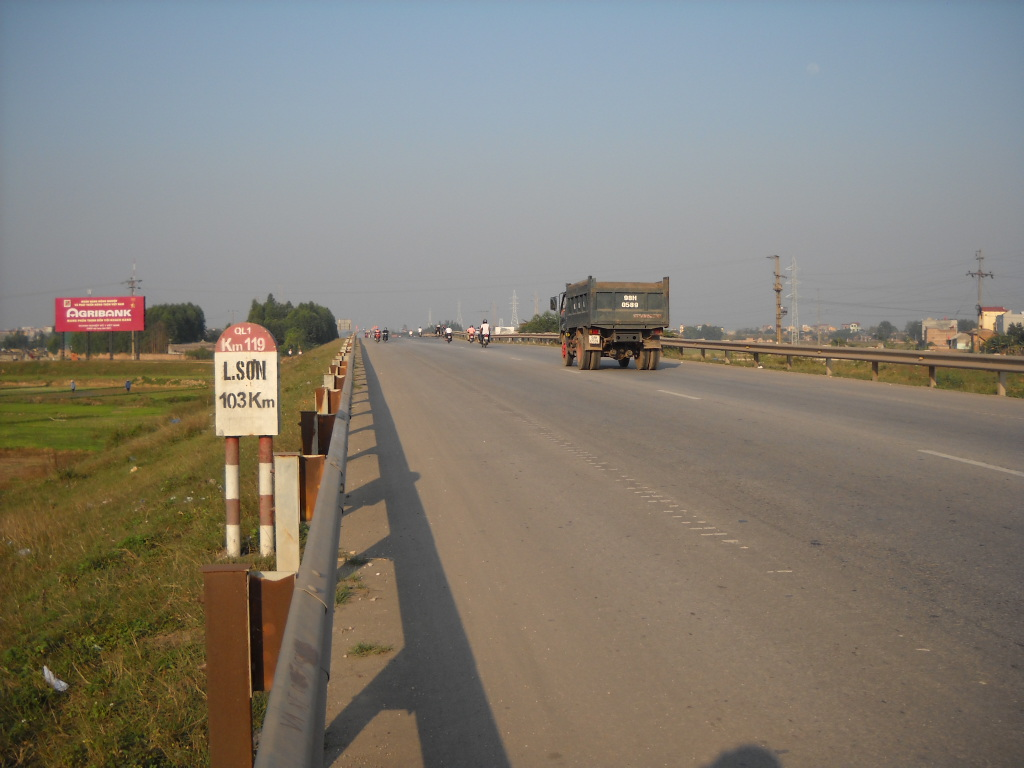
Highway in Bắc Giang province

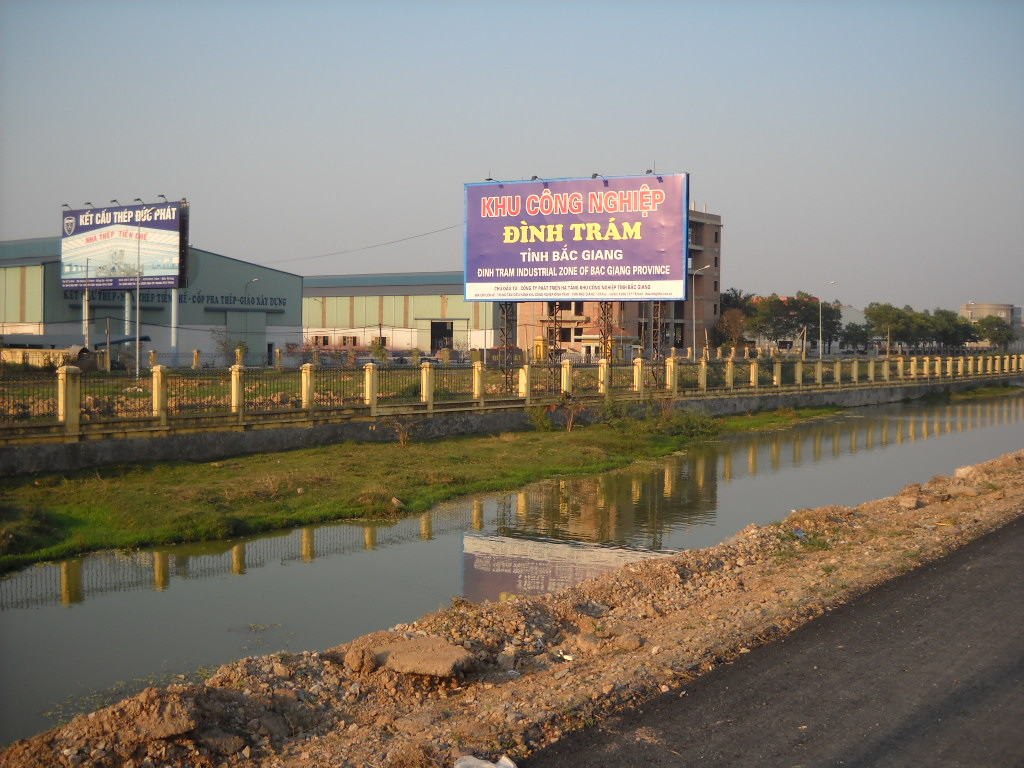
Việt Yên

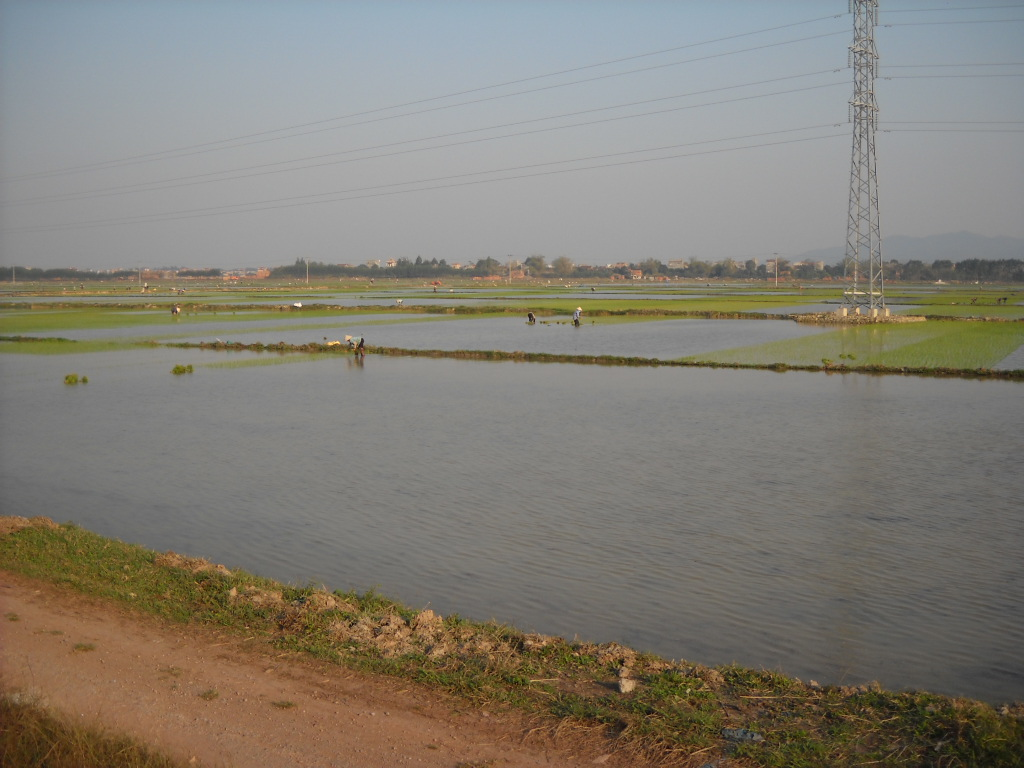
Việt Yên

== Economy ==
Bắc Giang's land area is primarily dedicated to agriculture. The province is becoming known as a producer of fruit, particularly pineapples and lychees. Around a quarter of Bắc Giang's land area is devoted to forestry. Located 50 kilometres (31 mi) from Hanoi, the province is within both the Hanoi-Hải Phòng-Quảng Ninh Economic Corridor, and the Nanning-Lạng Sơn-Hanoi-Hải Phòng-Quảng Ninh Economic Corridor. Before the province was formulated in 1997 and industrial development of the region was initiated, the GDP of the province was only US$170 with Agro-Forestry accounting for 55% and Industry hardly contributed. It was a poor economy with 90% of agricultural workers remaining below the poverty line. However, during the period 1997–2008, the province having launched several industrial projects in all its districts, 410 projects were launched with investment of US$23.174 billion that included 74 "Foreign Direct Investment" projects worth US$432.9 million. As a result, several economic farming models were introduced, which resulted in "Rural Economic Development", social consumer retail sales, and services got a boost, the poverty rate (2005 level) reduced to 17.78%, and textiles and garment exports accounted for about US$130 million, which was 76% of the province's export turnover.

Infrastructure such as National Highways and rural roads were substantially expanded, towns were better planned and beautified. Industrial parks, urban Areas-service and high-tech parks are being added. Key Industries like fertilizer, high technology, engineering, building materials, assembling automobiles, agricultural processing, forestry products, textiles and electric power generation are planned with the objective of achieving a GDP growth rate of 11-12% by 2020. The province has the Bắc Giang Department of Industry and Trade established in 2008 by the Bắc Giang People's Committee, which unifies the Department of Industry and the Department of Trade and Tourism; this testifies to the importance given to promote industrial development of the province.

Some of the economic indicators in respect of farming, agriculture and industrial production are the following. As against the national figure of 7592 of Agriculture, Forestry and Fishery cooperatives there are only agriculture cooperatives in the province. There are 1786 farms as against the national number of 120,699. The output value of agriculture produce at constant 1994 prices in the province was 3,491.7 billion đồngs against the national figure of 156,681.9 billion đồngs. The province produced 569,400 tonnes of cereals as against the national production of 43.26 million tonnes The per capita production of cereals in the district was 349.7 kilograms (771 lb) as against the national figure of 501.8 kilograms (1,106 lb) in 2007.

In 2007, the industrial output of the province was only 3,868.3 billion đồngs out of the total national output of 1.47 million billion đồngs.

On Vietnam's Provincial

Competitiveness Index 2023, a key tool for evaluating the business environment in Vietnam's provinces, Bac Giang received a score of 69.75. This was a fall from 2022 in which the province received a score of 72.8. In 2023, the province received its highest scores on the 'Business Support Policy' and 'Time Costs' criterion and lowest on 'Labour Policy' and ‘Transparency’.

Thác Hương irrigation scheme

The Thac Huong Irrigation Scheme in the Yên Thế district, adjacent to Thái Nguyên province and west of Hanoi, was implemented in the early 20th century by the-then French colonial government. Construction of the irrigation scheme for utilization of the Cầu River was started in 1922 and operationalised in 1936. The irrigation system was built on the left bank of the river and envisaged irrigation to a total command area of 57,325 hectares (141,650 acres). Net irrigation provided was to an area of 28,500 hectares (70,000 acres) in Phú Binh (Thái Nguyên province), Việt Yên, Tân Yên, and Hiệp Hòa (in Bắc Giang Province). Additionally, a supply of potable drinking water was built into the system. Navigation was part of its beneficial uses as a transport route for shipment of rice and salt from Hai Phong to Thái Nguyên. The scheme, as built, has a concrete dam of 6.7 metres (22 ft) height and 100 metres (330 ft) length, known as the Thac Huong dam across the Cầu River. A head regulator on the canal is 36 metres (118 ft) in width and 6.5 metres (21 ft) in height. 10 branch canal intakes were provided, each with a capacity of 25m3/s. However, the energy dissipation arrangements of the dam have been damaged, several times since it was built, by floods and bombing raids. The Asian Development Bank (ADB) funded the rehabilitation project in 2000. Although restored after 1955, the project is facing water shortages and is unable to meet the demands for irrigation due to building of many projects in the upstream reaches of the river, over utilisation by industries and poor maintenance. Transbasin diversions have been implemented along with pumping from other streams to meet the water demands for irrigation and other uses of drinking water and industries.

=== Lychee ===
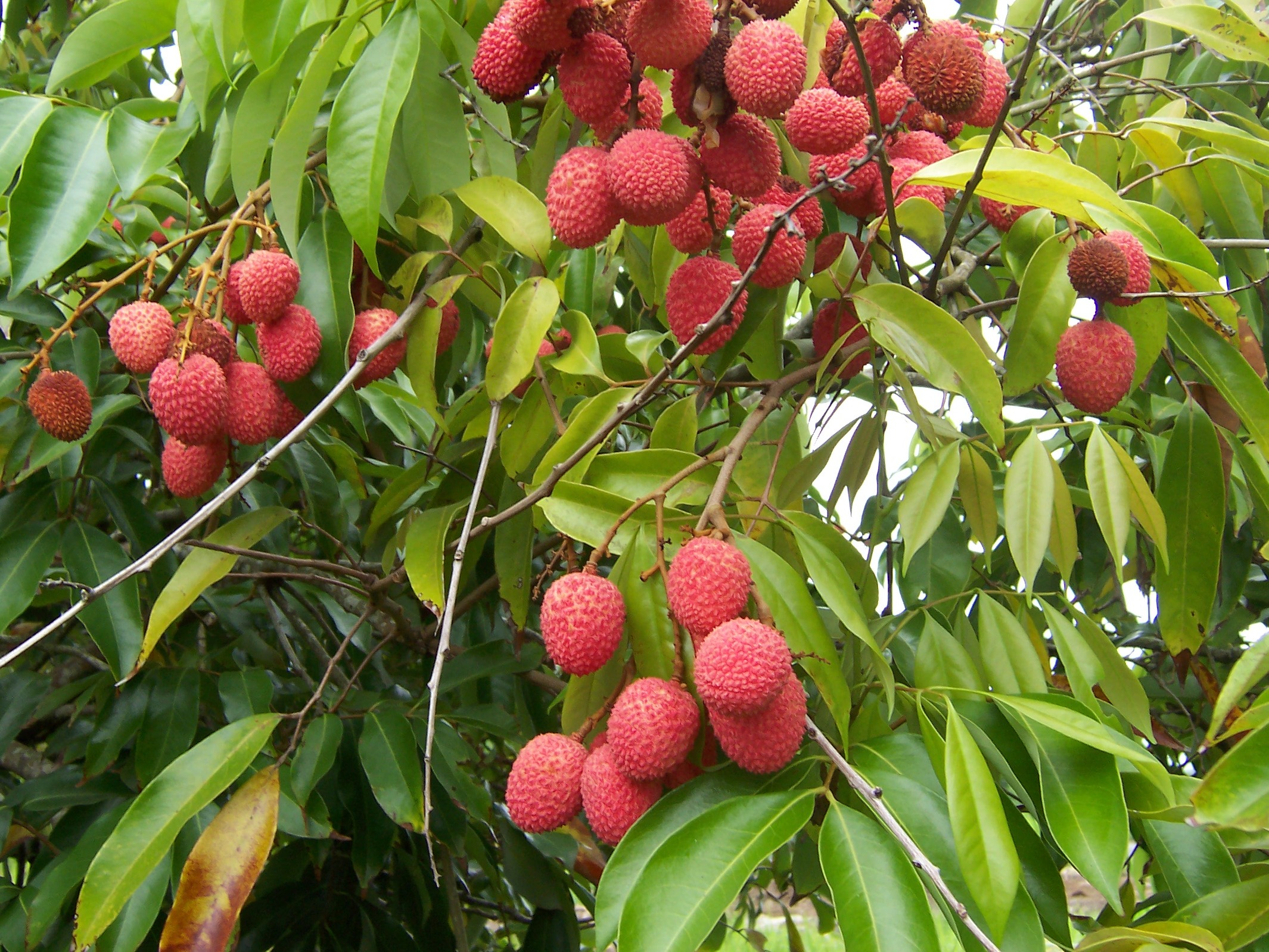
Lychee - a dominant commercial fruit tree.

Lychee (vải thiều) is a dominant fruit crop and even cultural symbol of Bắc Giang province. It is grown in an area of 20,275 hectares (50,100 acres) in this province, out of a total area of 35,352 hectares (87,360 acres) in the country and the production is reported to be 20,248 tonnes. This variety originated from Hải Dương province (Thanh Hà District) and is commercially cultivated in Lục Ngạn, Lục Nam and Yên Thế districts of the province, apart from other provinces in the country.

According to the Research Institute of Fruits and Vegetables (RIFAV), 33 accessions have been identified as 33 cultivars of lychee grown in different locations in home gardens and consolidated farms.

== Notable people ==
- Phạm Thị Hải Chuyền (born 1952), politician

== See also ==
- Bắc Kạn province
- Bắc Ninh province
- Lạng Sơn province
- Quảng Ninh province
