= Việt Yên (town) =

Coordinates: 21.2726°N 106.1002°E

- District-level town (Class-4)
- Việt Yên Town; Thị xã Việt Yên
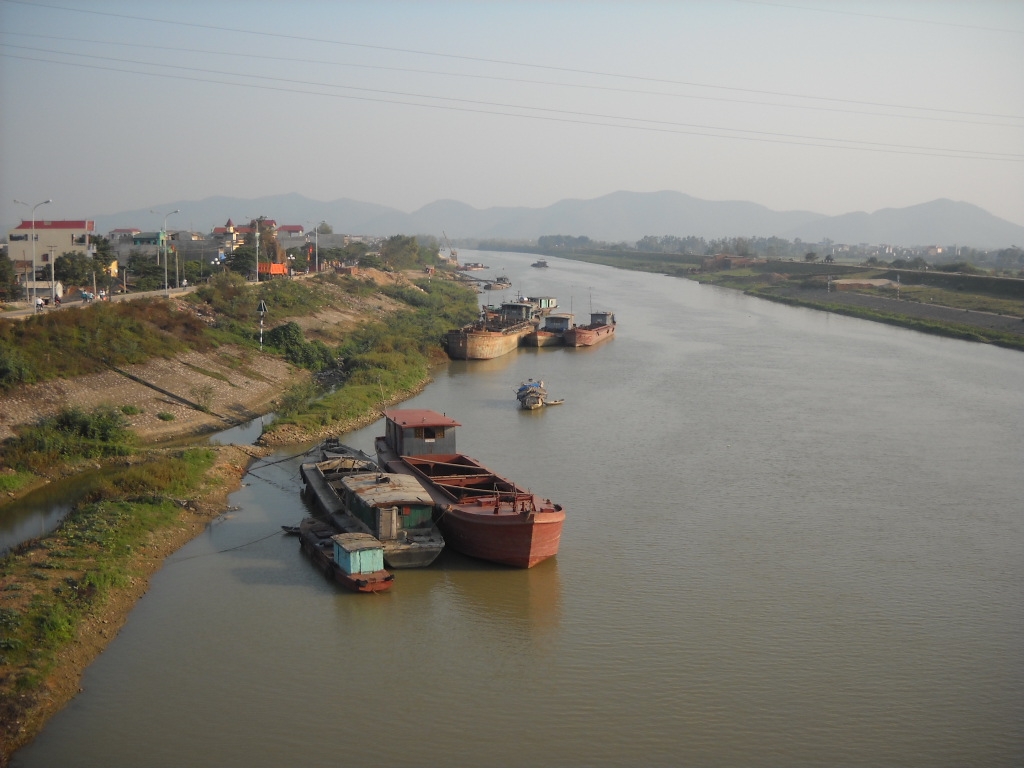

- Seal
- Interactive map of Việt Yên
- Country: Vietnam
- Province: Bắc Giang province

Government
  - Party Secretary: Lê Ô Pích
  - People's Council Chairman: Lê Ô Pích
  - People's Committee Chairman: Nguyễn Hồng Đức

Area
  - Total: 66.2 sq mi (171.4 km^{2})

Population (2022)
  - Total: 229.162 người
- Time zone: UTC+7 (Indochina Time)

Việt Yên is a former district-level town (thị xã) of Bắc Giang province in the Northeast region of Vietnam. Việt Yên borders on the south with Bắc Ninh province; on the west with Hiệp Hòa district; on the east with Yên Dũng district; and on the north with Tân Yên district and Bắc Giang City.

== Administrative divisions ==
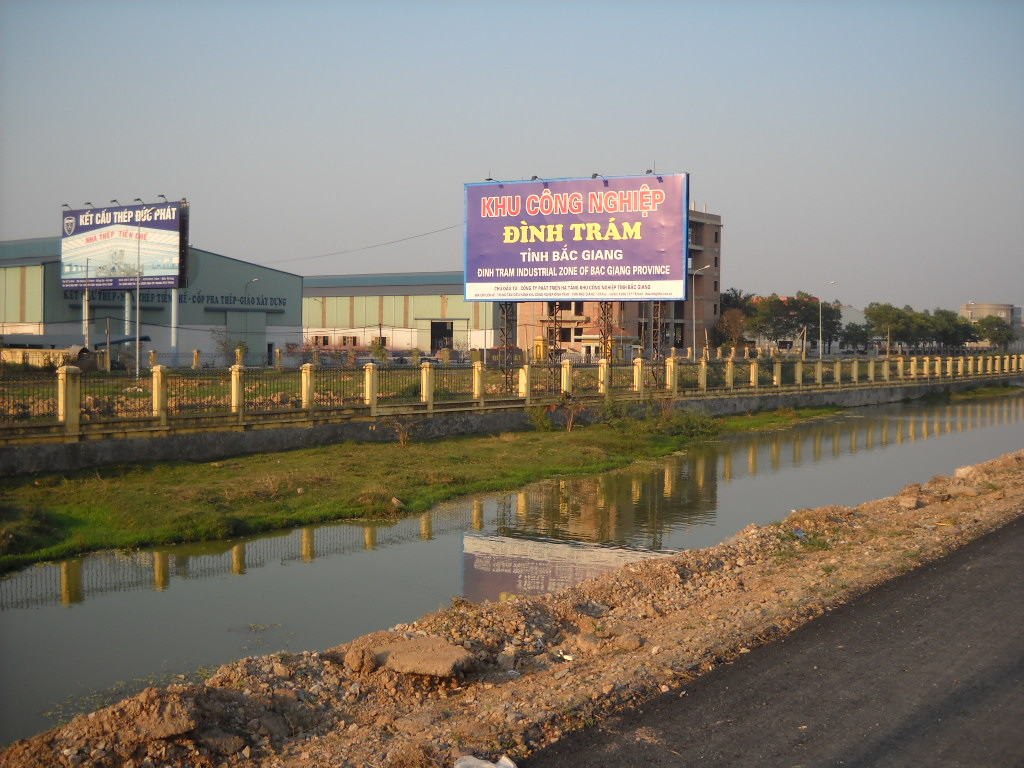

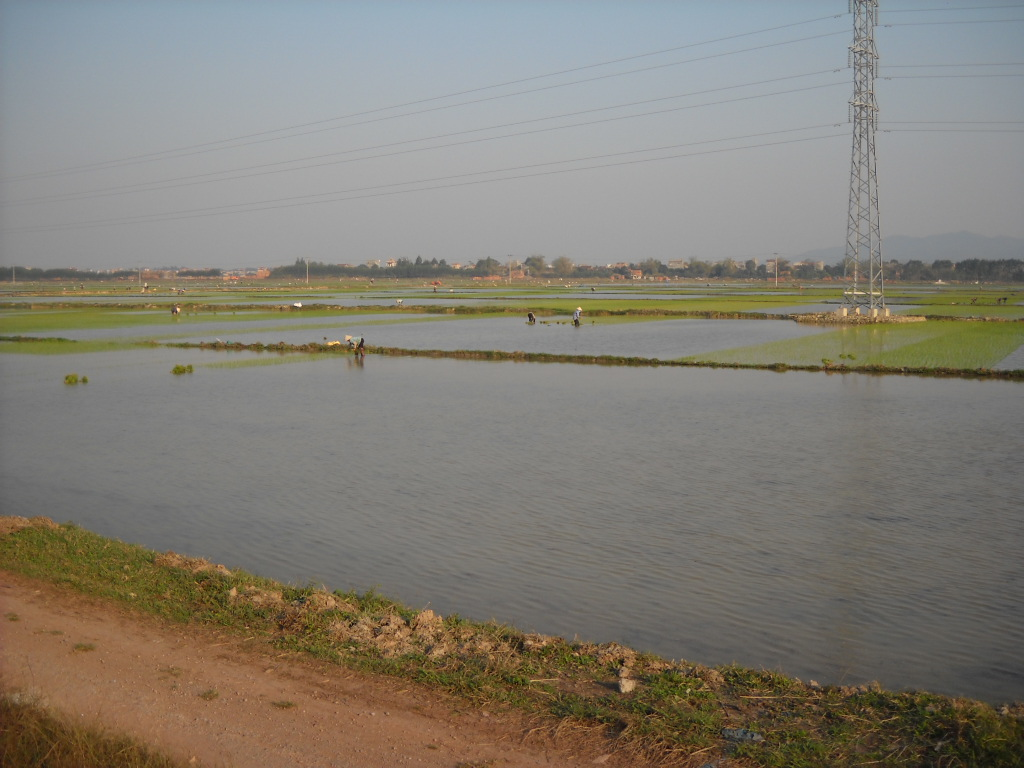

The town is divided into 9 wards: Bích Động (capital), Hồng Thái, Nếnh, Ninh Sơn, Quang Châu, Quảng Minh, Tăng Tiến, Tự Lạn, and Vân Trung, and 8 communes: Hương Mai, Minh Đức, Nghĩa Trung, Thượng Lan, Tiên Sơn, Trung Sơn, Vân Hà, and Việt Tiến.
