= Chũ =

- Ward
- Interactive map of Chũ
- Coordinates: 21.3733°N 106.566°E
- Country: Vietnam
- Region: Red River Delta
- City: Bắc Ninh
- Established: 1 January 2025
- Seat: 364 Thân Cảnh Phúc

Area
  - Total: 69.16 km^{2} (26.70 sq mi)

Population (31 December 2024)
  - Total: 58,409
  - Density: 844/km^{2} (2,190/sq mi)
- Website: https://chu.bacninh.gov.vn

Chũ is a ward (phường) and town of Bắc Ninh, in north-eastern Vietnam. It is one of the 99 new wards, communes and special zones of the province following the reorganization in 2025.

== Geography ==
Chũ Ward is bordered by:

- Lục Ngạn commune to the east;
- Phượng Sơn ward to the west;
- Nam Dương and Đèo Gia communes to the south;
- Kiên Lao and Biên Sơn communes to the north.

Chũ ward covers an area of 69.16 km² and has a population of 58,409 people, resulting in a population density of 844 people per km².

Chũ ward is located alongside the Chũ River. Its population consists mainly of local people from surrounding areas who have settled there.

== History ==
The ward's name was inherited from the former Chũ town in the former Bắc Giang province.

The Standing Committee of the National Assembly issued Resolution No. 1658/NQ-UBTVQH15 on the arrangement of commune-level administrative units in Bắc Ninh province in 2025 (the resolution took effect on 16 June 2025). Accordingly, the entire natural area and population of Chũ ward, Thanh Hải ward, Hồng Giang ward, and Trù Hựu ward (in the former Chũ town) were merged to form a new ward named Chũ.

On 24 August 2026, the National Assembly issued Resolution No. 39/2026/QH16 establishing Bắc Ninh city from the entire natural area and population of Bắc Ninh province. The resolution took effect on 20 September 2026. Chũ ward has since been part of Bắc Ninh city.
