= Yên Dũng district =

Coordinates: 21.217°N 106.250°E

Yên Dũng district Huyện Yên Dũng
- District
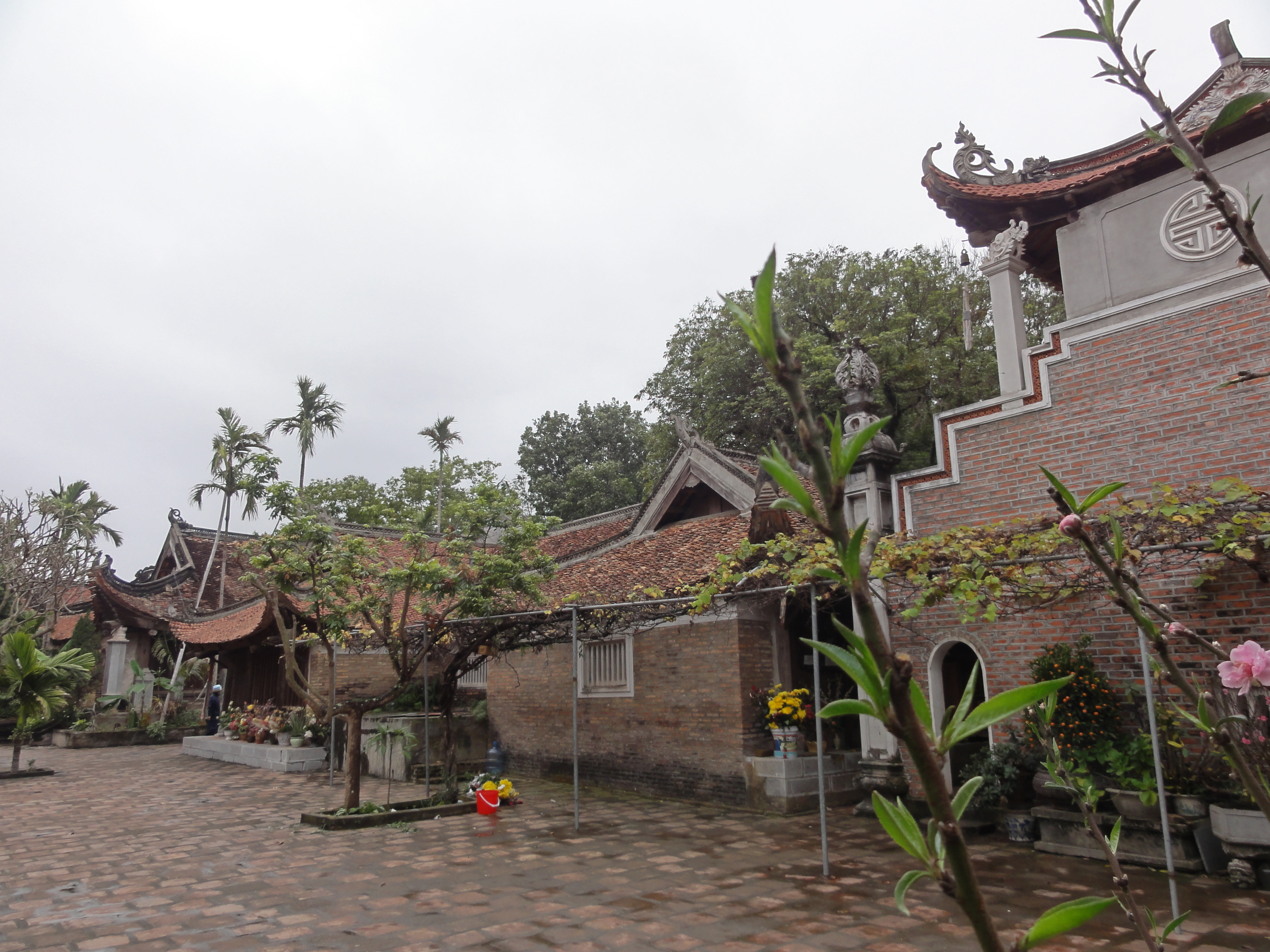

- Seal
- Interactive map of Yên Dũng district
- Country: Vietnam
- Province: Bắc Giang
- Capital: Nham Biền

Government
  - Party Secretary: Phan Thế Tuấn
  - People's Council Chairman: Bùi Quang Huy
  - People's Committee Chairman: Phan Thế Tuấn

Area
  - Land: 82 sq mi (213 km^{2})

Population (2019 census)
  - District: 152,125
  - Density: 1,850/sq mi (714/km^{2})
  - Urban: 14,673
  - Rural: 137,452
- Time zone: UTC+7 (Indochina Time)

Yên Dũng is a rural district of Bắc Giang province in the Northeast region of Vietnam. As of 2019 the district had a population of 152,125. The district covers an area of 213 km^{2} (82 sq mi). The district capital lies at Nham Biền.

The district includes the townships of Nham Biền, Tân An and the rural communes of:

1. Đồng Phúc
2. Đồng Việt
3. Tư Mại
4. Đức Giang
5. Tiến Dũng
6. Cảnh Thụy
7. Lãng Sơn
8. Trí Yên
9. Lão Hộ
10. Xuân Phú
11. Tân Liễu
12. Tiền Phong
13. Yên Lư
14. Hương Gián
15. Quỳnh Sơn
16. Nội Hoàng
