= Tân Yên district =

Coordinates: 21.383°N 106.133°E

Tân Yên district Huyện Tân Yên
- District
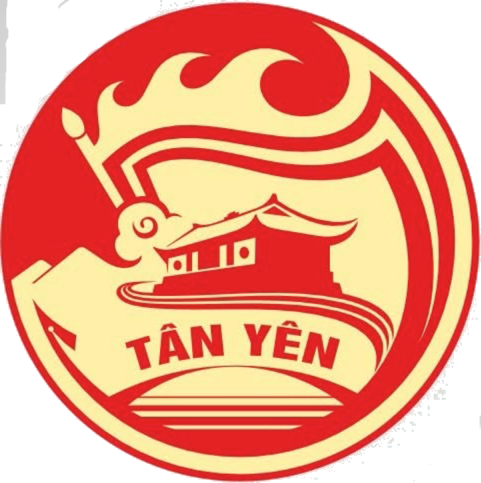
- Seal
- Interactive map of Tân Yên district
- Country: Vietnam
- Province: Bắc Giang
- Capital: Cao Thượng

Government
  - Party Secretary: Lâm Thị Hương Thành
  - People's Council Chairman: Dương Ngô Mạnh
  - People's Committee Chairman: Lâm Thị Hương Thành

Area
  - Total: 78.6 sq mi (203.7 km^{2})

Population (2018)
  - Total: 162,500
- Time zone: UTC+7 (Indochina Time)

Tân Yên is a former rural district of Bắc Giang province in the Northeast region of Vietnam. As of 2018 the district had a population of 162,500. The district covers an area of 204 km^{2}. The district capital lies at Cao Thượng.

== Administrative divisions ==
The district is divided administratively into two townships: Cao Thượng (the capital) and Nhã Nam, and into the following communes:

1. Quế Nham
2. Việt Lập
3. Liên Chung
4. Cao Xá
5. Ngọc Lý
6. Ngọc Thiện
7. Ngọc Châu
8. Ngọc Vân
9. Hợp Đức
10. Phúc Hòa
11. Tân Trung
12. An Dương
13. Lan Giới
14. Nhã Nam
15. Đại Hóa
16. Quang Tiến
17. Phúc Sơn
18. Lam Cốt
19. Việt Ngọc
20. Song Vân
21. Liên Sơn
