= Chũ (town) =

Former district-level town of the former Bắc Giang province, Vietnam

Coordinates: 21°22′24″N 106°33′58″E

- District-level town (Class-4)
- Chũ Town; Thị xã Chũ
- Interactive map of Chũ
- Country: Vietnam
- Province: Bắc Giang province

Area
  - Total: 97.12 sq mi (251.55 km^{2})

Population (2023)
  - Total: 127,881
- Time zone: UTC+7 (Indochina Time)

Chũ is a former district-level town (thị xã) of Bắc Giang province in the Northeast region of Vietnam.

== Administrative divisions ==
The town is divided into 5 wards: Chũ (capital), Hồng Giang, Phượng Sơn, Thanh Hải, Trù Hựu, and 5 communes: Kiên Lao, Kiên Thành, Mỹ An, Nam Dương, and Quý Sơn.
