= Đức Giang =

Đức Giang may refer to several places in Vietnam, including:

- Đức Giang, Long Biên, a ward of Long Biên District in Hanoi
- Đức Giang, Hoài Đức, a commune of Hoài Đức District in Hanoi
- Đức Giang, Bắc Giang, a commune of Yên Dũng District
- Đức Giang, Hà Tĩnh, a commune of Vũ Quang District
