= Bắc Giang (city) =

Former provincial city of the former Bắc Giang province, Vietnam

Bắc Giang Phủ Lạng Thương
- Provincial city (Class-2)
- Bắc Giang City; Thành phố Bắc Giang
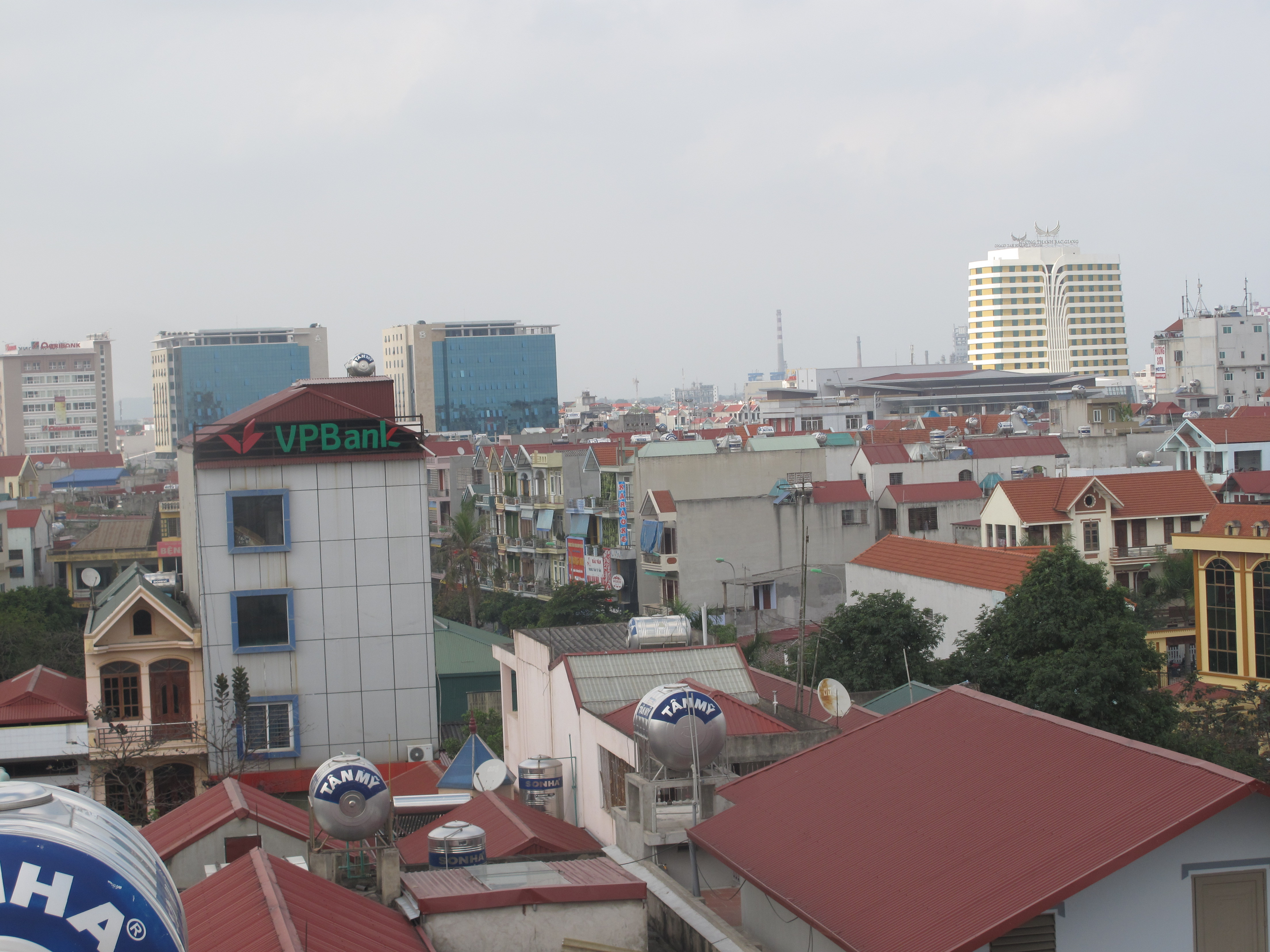

- Seal
- Interactive map of Bắc Giang
- Location of in Vietnam Bắc Giang (Southeast Asia) Bắc Giang (Asia)
- Coordinates: 21°16′N 106°12′E
- Country: Vietnam
- Province: Bắc Giang
- Dissolution: July 1st, 2025

Government
  - Party Secretary: Nguyễn Sỹ Nhận
  - People's Council Chairman: Mai Sơn
  - People's Committee Chairman: Lê Bá Chiến

Area
  - Provincial city (Class-2): 258.3 km^{2} (99.7 sq mi)

Population (2023 census)
  - Provincial city (Class-2): 450,000
  - Density: 1,700/km^{2} (4,500/sq mi)
  - Urban: 250,000
- Time zone: UTC+7 (Indochina Time)
- Climate: Cwa

Bắc Giang is a former provincial city in the former Bắc Giang province of Vietnam. Its name, deriving from that of the Province Sino-Vietnamese, means "north of the river." The location is very convenient for transportation: it is 50 km north of Hanoi, in the middle position on major transportation routes (roads, international railway) connecting Hanoi with the Lạng Sơn City and Đồng Đăng international border gate; Bắc Giang is located in an important transportation hub. The Thương river runs through the town's southern part heading for Haiphong.

Although the name of Bắc Giang (北江 "North river") Province is very old, established in its first form in 1466, there was historically no town of that name. The town was created out of the old Láng Thượng District after independence. The Suối Mỡ thermal springs area is 37 km from the town centre. Bắc Giang Peace Park was a sister city project with Madison, Wisconsin, United States.

== Economic situation ==
Bắc Giang City is a center of the nitrogen - chemical industry, textile industry, also the distribution center, and transit of goods from China, as well as the place for local products being exported to China. The city has some small- and medium-sized industrial zones associated with large industrial zones such as Quang Châu, Đình Trám, Vân Trung and Song Khê - Nội Hoàng. The emblem of the BG industry is the Hà Bắc fertilizer factory, the first fertilizer plant in Vietnam.

In 2013, Bắc Giang City maintained high and stable economic growth reaching 17.3%, with the GDP per capita reaching $3000. The economic structure has shifted positively: trade and services 45.2%; industry, handicraft - construction 51.3%; agriculture - fishery 3.5%. The city has developed diverse industries such as agricultural and forestry processing, mechanical, chemical, textile, electronic and construction materials. Bắc Giang City is well known as one of the distribution centers for the transit of goods imported from China to Vietnam and vice versa. The service network has been developed strongly with large-scale supermarkets such as Big C Bắc Giang, Co.opmart supermarket, Bắc Giang Supermarket, Imexco Supermarket, Mediamart, Văn Chiến appliances and electrics store.

== Administrative subdivisions ==
The city is subdivided to 16 commune-level subdivisions, including the wards of: Đa Mai, Dĩnh Kế, Hoàng Văn Thụ, Lê Lợi, Mỹ Độ, Ngô Quyền, Thọ Xương, Trần Nguyên Hãn, Trần Phú, Xương Giang and the rural communes of: Dĩnh Trì, Đồng Sơn, Song Khê, Song Mai, Tân Mỹ and Tân Tiến.

== Gallery ==
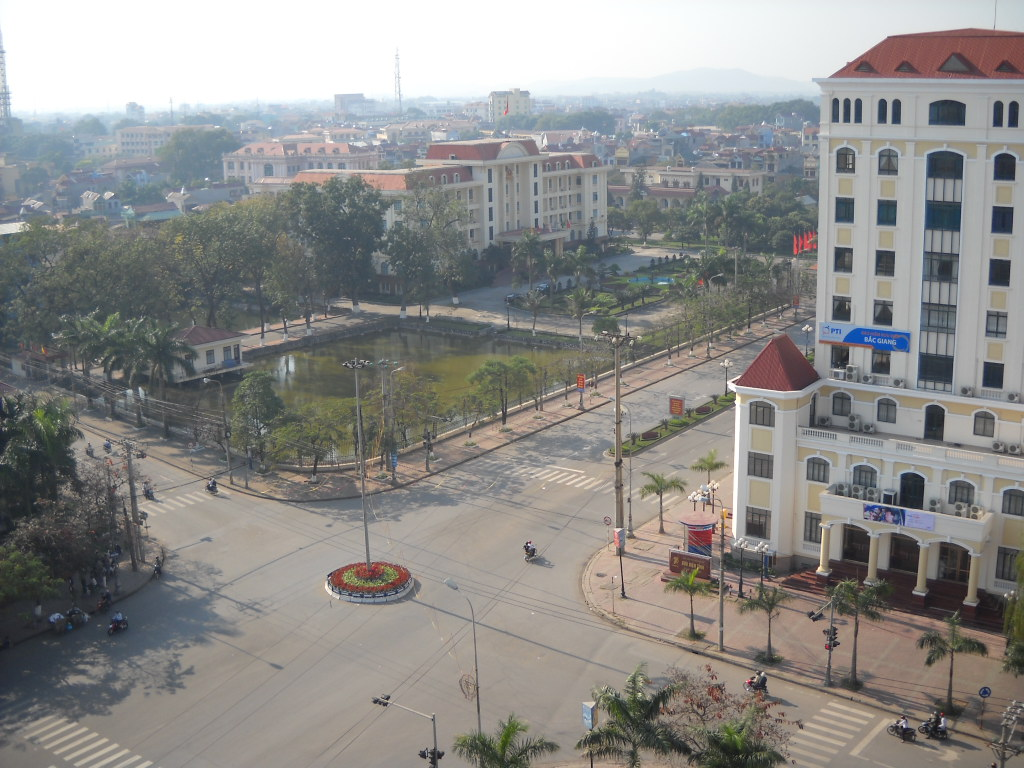
Bắc Giang

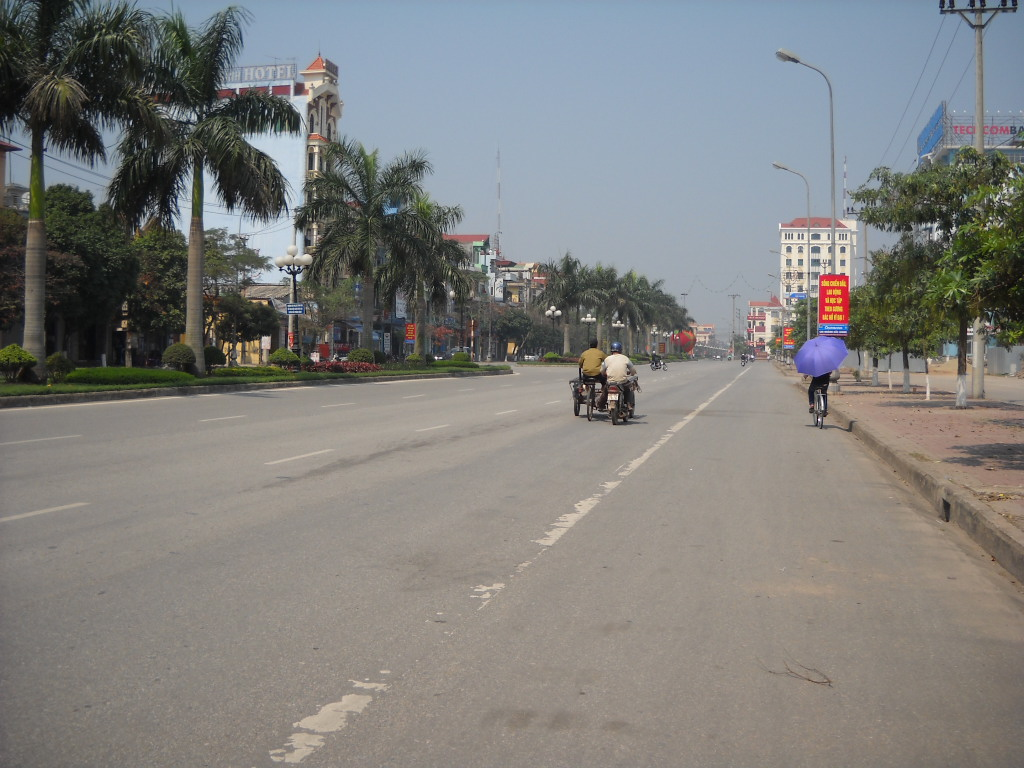
Bắc Giang

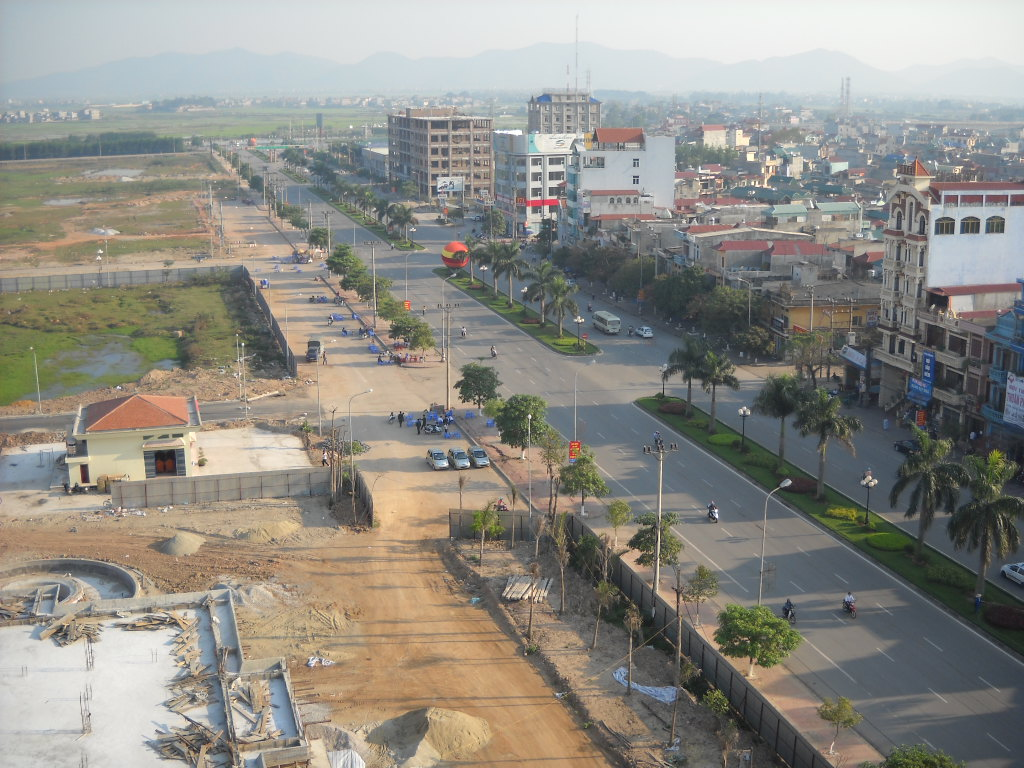
Bắc Giang

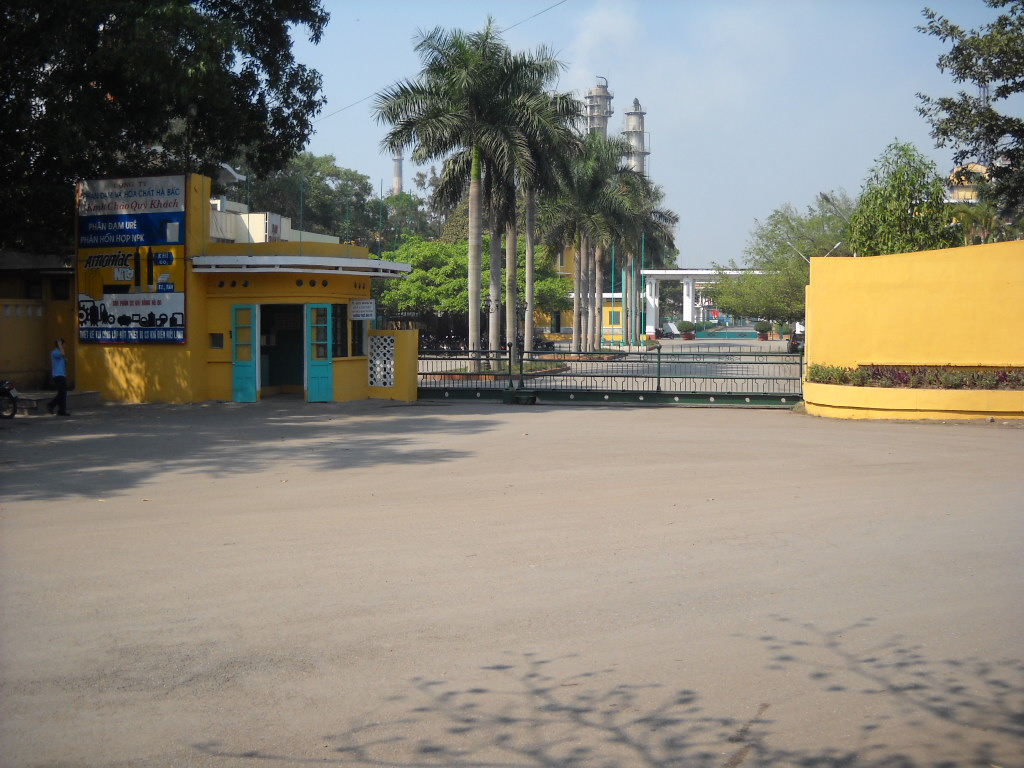
Bắc Giang

== Climate ==
Climate data for Bắc Giang
Month	Jan	Feb	Mar	Apr	May	Jun	Jul	Aug	Sep	Oct	Nov	Dec	Year
Record high °C (°F)	32.6 (90.7)	34.2 (93.6)	35.3 (95.5)	37.0 (98.6)	41.2 (106.2)	40.8 (105.4)	38.7 (101.7)	38.5 (101.3)	38.2 (100.8)	35.7 (96.3)	36.2 (97.2)	31.5 (88.7)	41.2 (106.2)
Mean daily maximum °C (°F)	19.7 (67.5)	20.5 (68.9)	22.9 (73.2)	27.1 (80.8)	31.3 (88.3)	32.8 (91.0)	32.8 (91.0)	32.2 (90.0)	31.4 (88.5)	29.3 (84.7)	25.8 (78.4)	22.1 (71.8)	27.3 (81.1)
Daily mean °C (°F)	16.2 (61.2)	17.4 (63.3)	20.1 (68.2)	23.9 (75.0)	27.2 (81.0)	28.8 (83.8)	29.1 (84.4)	28.5 (83.3)	27.5 (81.5)	25.0 (77.0)	21.3 (70.3)	17.7 (63.9)	23.6 (74.5)
Mean daily minimum °C (°F)	13.6 (56.5)	15.3 (59.5)	18.1 (64.6)	21.6 (70.9)	24.4 (75.9)	25.9 (78.6)	26.3 (79.3)	25.8 (78.4)	24.6 (76.3)	21.9 (71.4)	18.1 (64.6)	14.9 (58.8)	20.9 (69.6)
Record low °C (°F)	3.4 (38.1)	4.6 (40.3)	5.9 (42.6)	12.2 (54.0)	16.1 (61.0)	19.2 (66.6)	21.8 (71.2)	20.9 (69.6)	16.6 (61.9)	10.3 (50.5)	6.7 (44.1)	2.8 (37.0)	2.8 (37.0)
Average rainfall mm (inches)	25.9 (1.02)	25.4 (1.00)	52.0 (2.05)	100.4 (3.95)	187.4 (7.38)	247.2 (9.73)	256.3 (10.09)	301.0 (11.85)	178.1 (7.01)	109.0 (4.29)	43.2 (1.70)	20.2 (0.80)	1,545.9 (60.86)
Average rainy days	8.4	10.4	15.2	13.5	13.8	15.3	15.6	16.8	12.1	9.1	6.4	5.0	141.5
Average relative humidity (%)	78.7	81.6	84.8	85.7	83.1	82.3	82.6	84.8	82.6	79.9	77.8	76.4	81.7
Mean monthly sunshine hours	70.3	46.9	45.6	86.7	184.8	173.6	194.1	178.4	189.2	169.1	142.9	119.9	1,603.8
Source 1: Vietnam Institute for Building Science and Technology
Source 2: The Yearbook of Indochina (1932-1933)

== Notable people ==
- Phùng Khánh Linh (born 1994), singer and songwriter
