= Xuân Phú =

Xuân Phú may refer to several places in Vietnam, including:

- Xuân Phú, Huế, a ward of Huế
- Xuân Phú, Phú Yên, a ward of Sông Cầu
- Xuân Phú, Hanoi, a commune of Phúc Thọ District
- Xuân Phú, Bắc Giang, a commune of Yên Dũng District
- Xuân Phú, Đắk Lắk, a commune of Ea Kar District
- Xuân Phú, Đồng Nai, a commune of Xuân Lộc District
- Xuân Phú, Nam Định, a commune of Xuân Trường District
- Xuân Phú, Quan Hóa, a commune of Quan Hóa District in Thanh Hóa Province
- Xuân Phú, Thọ Xuân, a commune of Thọ Xuân District in Thanh Hóa Province
