= Đồng Phú (disambiguation) =

Dong Phu may refer to several places in Vietnam, including:

== Đông Phú ==
- Đông Phú, Bắc Ninh, a commune of Bắc Ninh
- Đông Phú, Quảng Nam, a former township and capital of Quế Sơn District
- Đông Phú, Hậu Giang, a former commune of Châu Thành District, Hậu Giang
- Đông Phú, Thanh Hóa, a former commune of Đông Sơn District

== Đồng Phú ==
- Đồng Phú, Đồng Nai, is a ward of Đồng Nai
- Đồng Phú district, a former rural district of Bình Phước Province
- Đồng Phú, Quảng Bình, a former ward of Đồng Hới
- Đồng Phú, Hanoi, a former commune of Chương Mỹ District
- Đồng Phú, Thái Bình, a former commune of Đông Hưng District
- Đồng Phú, Vĩnh Long, a former commune of Long Hồ District
