= An Lạc =

An Lac or An Lạc in Vietnamese may refer to:

- An Lạc, Ho Chi Minh City, ward of Ho Chi Minh City
- An Lạc, Bắc Ninh, commune of Bắc Ninh
