= Nghĩa Hưng =

Nghĩa Hưng may refer to several places in Vietnam, including:

- Nghĩa Hưng District, a rural district of Nam Định Province
- Nghĩa Hưng, Gia Lai, a commune of Chư Păh District
- Nghĩa Hưng, Bắc Giang, a commune of Lạng Giang District
- Nghĩa Hưng, Nghệ An, a commune of Nghĩa Đàn District
- Nghĩa Hưng, Vĩnh Phúc, a commune of Vĩnh Tường District
