= Tiền Phong =

Tiền Phong (Vietnamese for pioneer) may refer to:

- Tiền Phong (newspaper)
- Tien Phong Bank
- Tiền Phong, Bắc Ninh, a ward in Bắc Ninh Province
