= Cam Ly =

Cam Ly may refer to:

- Cẩm Ly (born 1970), a Vietnamese singer
- Cẩm Lý, a commune in Vietnam
