= Nghĩa Hòa =

Nghĩa Hòa may refer to several rural communes in Vietnam, including:

- Nghĩa Hòa, Nghệ An, a commune of Thái Hòa
- Nghĩa Hòa, Gia Lai, a commune of Chư Păh District
- Nghĩa Hòa, Bắc Giang, a commune of Lạng Giang District
- Nghĩa Hòa, Quảng Ngãi, a commune of Tư Nghĩa District
