= Yên Định =

Yên Định may refer to:

- Yên Định District in Thanh Hóa Province, Vietnam
- Yên Định, Bắc Giang in Sơn Động District, Bắc Giang Province, Vietnam
- Yên Định, Nam Định, the district capital of Hải Hậu District, Nam Định Province, Vietnam
