= Sơn Hải =

Sơn Hải may refer to several places in Vietnam, including:

- Sơn Hải, Bắc Giang, a rural commune of Lục Ngạn District.
- Sơn Hải, Kiên Giang, a rural commune of Kiên Lương District.
- Sơn Hải, Lào Cai, a rural commune of Bảo Thắng District.
- Sơn Hải, Nghệ An, a rural commune of Quỳnh Lưu District.
- Sơn Hải, Quảng Ngãi, a rural commune of Sơn Hà District.
