= Nghĩa Phương (disambiguation) =

Nghĩa Phương may refer to several places in Vietnam, including:

- Nghĩa Phương, Bắc Giang, a rural commune of Lục Nam District.
- Nghĩa Phương, Quảng Ngãi, a rural commune of Tư Nghĩa District.
