= Trường Sơn =

Trường Sơn may refer to:

- Trường Sơn, Sầm Sơn, a ward of Sầm Sơn, Thanh Hóa Province
- Trường Sơn, Haiphong, a township of An Lão district, Haiphong
- Trường Sơn, Hà Tĩnh, a rural commune of Đức Thọ district
- Trường Sơn, Bắc Giang, a rural commune of Lục Nam district
- Trường Sơn, Nông Cống, a rural commune of Nông Cống district
- Trường Sơn, Quảng Bình, a rural commune of Quảng Ninh district
- Dãy Trường Sơn, Vietnamese name for the Annamite Range
