= Lục Nam River =

River in Vietnam

Coordinates: 21°11′35″N 106°18′50″E

The Lục Nam River (Vietnamese: Sông Lục Nam), also called Minh Đức River or Chũ River, is a tributary of Thái Bình River in Northern Vietnam. It flows for 200 kilometres through Bắc Giang Province and Lạng Sơn Province.
