= Cấm Sơn Reservoir =

- Cấm Sơn Lake
- Hồ Cấm Sơn (Vietnamese)
- Location within Vietnam
- Location: Lục Ngạn District, Bắc Giang Province, Vietnam
- Coordinates: 21°32′4″N 106°33′52″E
- Type: Reservoir
- Max. length: 30 kilometres (19 mi)
- Max. width: 7 kilometres (4.3 mi)
- Surface area: 2,600 hectares (6,400 acres)

Cấm Sơn Reservoir (Vietnamese: Hồ Cấm Sơn) is a lake in Lục Ngạn District, Bắc Giang Province, Vietnam, near the border with Lạng Sơn Province. The lake lies off Highway 279, northeast of the city of Bắc Giang. It is one of the largest lakes in the Northern Vietnam region.

The lake has an area of some 2,650 hectares (6,500 acres), but during the rainy season when flooding is common, the lake can expand to some 3,000 hectares (7,400 acres). The length of the lake is about 30 kilometres (19 mi). Its widest point is about 7 kilometres (4.3 mi) and narrowest point is about 200 metres (660 ft).
