= Tân Sơn, Bắc Ninh =

Coordinates: 21.5711°N 106.6389°E

Tân Sơn
- Commune
- Interactive map of Tân Sơn
- Country: Vietnam
- City: Bắc Ninh
- Time zone: UTC+07:00

Tân Sơn is a commune (xã) in Bắc Ninh, in northeastern Vietnam.
