= Lục Sơn =

Coordinates: 21°13′42″N 106°36′52″E

- Commune and village
- Interactive map of Lục Sơn
- Country: Vietnam
- City: Bắc Ninh
- Time zone: UTC+07:00

Lục Sơn is a commune (xã) and village in Bắc Ninh in northeastern Vietnam.
