= Thanh An, Ho Chi Minh City =

Thanh An Xã Thanh An
- Commune
- Interactive map of Thanh An
- Coordinates: 11°13′23″N 106°23′34″E
- Country: Vietnam
- Municipality: Ho Chi Minh City
- Established: June 16, 2025

Area
  - Total: 52.79 sq mi (136.72 km^{2})

Population (2024)
  - Total: 25,324
  - Density: 479.73/sq mi (185.23/km^{2})
- Time zone: UTC+07:00 (Indochina Time)
- Administrative code: 25807

Thanh An (Vietnamese: Xã Thanh An) is a commune of Ho Chi Minh City, Vietnam. It is one of the 168 new wards, communes and special zones of the city following the reorganization in 2025.

== History ==
On June 16, 2025, the National Assembly Standing Committee issued Resolution No. 1685/NQ-UBTVQH15 on the arrangement of commune-level administrative units of Ho Chi Minh City in 2025 (effective from June 16, 2025). Accordingly, the entire land area and population of Thanh An commune and part of Thanh Tuyền, An Lập, Định Hiệp communes of the former Dầu Tiếng district will be integrated into a new commune named Thanh An (Clause 145, Article 1).
