= Tuấn Đạo =

Coordinates: 21°17′N 106°46′E

- Commune and village
- Interactive map of Tuấn Đạo
- Country: Vietnam
- City: Bắc Ninh
- Time zone: UTC+07:00

Tuấn Đạo is a commune (xã) and village in Bắc Ninh, in northeastern Vietnam.
