= Bảo Đài =

Coordinates: 21°20′02″N 106°21′46″E

- Commune and village
- Interactive map of Bảo Đài
- Country: Vietnam
- City: Bắc Ninh
- Time zone: UTC+07:00

Bảo Đài is a commune (xã) and village in Bắc Ninh, in northeastern Vietnam.
