= Hoàng Vân =

Coordinates: 21°21′N 105°32′E

- Commune and village
- Interactive map of Hoàng Vân
- Country: Vietnam
- City: Bắc Ninh
- Time zone: UTC+07:00

Hoàng Vân is a commune (xã) and village in Bắc Ninh, in northeastern Vietnam.
