= Đại Sơn, Bắc Ninh =

Đại Sơn
- Commune
- Location in Vietnam
- Coordinates: 21°25′6″N 106°47′55″E
- Country: Vietnam
- City: Bắc Ninh
- Time zone: UTC+07:00

Đại Sơn is a commune (xã) in Bắc Ninh, in northeastern Vietnam.
