= Bắc Lũng =

Coordinates: 21°14′54″N 106°21′55″E

- Commune and village
- Interactive map of Bắc Lũng
- Country: Vietnam
- City: Bắc Ninh

Area
  - Total: 20.74 sq mi (53.72 km^{2})

Population (2024)
  - Total: 38,118
  - Density: 1,838/sq mi (709.6/km^{2})
- Time zone: UTC+07:00
- Postal code: 07513
- Website: baclung.bacninh.gov.vn

Bắc Lũng is a commune (xã) and village in Bắc Ninh Province, in northeastern Vietnam.
