= Dương Hưu =

Commune in Vietnam

Coordinates: 21°14′33″N 106°56′14″E

- Commune and village
- Interactive map of Dương Hưu
- Country: Vietnam
- City: Bắc Ninh
- Time zone: UTC+07:00
- Website: duonghuu.bacninh.gov.vn

Dương Hưu is a commune (xã) and village in Bắc Ninh, in northeastern Vietnam.
