= Hoàng An =

- Commune
- Interactive map of Hoàng An
- Coordinates: 21.348496307425304°N 105.5193751367027°E
- Country: Vietnam
- Region: Northeast
- Province: Phú Thọ
- Established: 16 June 2025
- Administrative headquarters: Hóc Hamlet

Area
  - Total: 20.80 km^{2} (8.03 sq mi)

Population (2025)
  - Total: 26,000
  - Density: 1,250/km^{2} (3,200/sq mi)
- Postal code: 15220
- Website: hoangan.phutho.gov.vn

Hoàng An is a commune in Phú Thọ province, Vietnam.

On 16 June 2025, the National Assembly of Vietnam adopted Resolution No. 203/2025/QH15 amending and supplementing several articles of the Constitution of Vietnam, which provided for the termination of district-level administrative units nationwide from 1 July 2025.

On the same date, the Standing Committee of the National Assembly of Vietnam issued Resolution No. 1676/NQ-UBTVQH15 on the arrangement of commune-level administrative units in Phú Thọ province in 2025. Under the resolution, the entire area and population of Hoàng Đan, Hoàng Lâu, and An Hòa communes were merged to form a new commune named Hoàng An.
