= Việt Yên =

- Ward
- Location in Vietnam
- Coordinates: 21°16′22″N 106°6′2″E
- Country: Vietnam
- City: Bắc Ninh
- Time zone: UTC+07:00
- Climate: Cwa

Việt Yên is a ward (phường) of Bắc Ninh, in north-eastern Vietnam.
