= Sa Lý =

Coordinates: 21°32′00″N 106°49′21″E

- Commune and village
- Interactive map of Sa Lý
- Country: Vietnam
- City: Bắc Ninh

Area
  - Total: 13.71 sq mi (35.52 km^{2})

Population (2016)
  - Total: 2,937
  - Density: 214/sq mi (82.6/km^{2})
- Time zone: UTC+07:00

Sa Lý is a commune (xã) and village in Bắc Ninh, in northeastern Vietnam.
