= An Lạc, Bắc Ninh =

Coordinates: 21°21′18″N 106°57′25″E

An Lạc
- Commune
- Interactive map of An Lạc
- Country: Vietnam
- City: Bắc Ninh

Area
  - Total: 46 sq mi (119 km^{2})

Population
  - Total: 3,228
  - Density: 70/sq mi (27/km^{2})
- Time zone: UTC+07:00
- Website: anlac.bacninh.gov.vn

An Lạc is a commune (xã) in Bắc Ninh, in northeastern Vietnam.
