= Nếnh =

Nenh
- Ward
- Location in Vietnam
- Coordinates: 21°14′21″N 106°5′58″E
- Country: Vietnam
- City: Bắc Ninh

Area
  - Total: 4.83 sq mi (12.51 km^{2})

Population (2019)
  - Total: 20,196
  - Density: 4,181/sq mi (1,614/km^{2})
- Time zone: UTC+7 (UTC+7)
- Website: nenh.bacninh.gov.vn

Nếnh is a ward (phường) in Bắc Ninh city, in north-eastern Vietnam.
