= Cảnh Thụy =

Coordinates: 21°11′43″N 106°15′36″E

- Ward and village
- Interactive map of Cảnh Thụy
- Country: Vietnam
- City: Bắc Ninh
- Time zone: UTC+07:00
- Website: canhthuy.bacninh.gov.vn

Cảnh Thụy is a ward (phường) and village in Bắc Ninh city, in northeastern Vietnam.
