= Yên Dũng, Bắc Ninh =

Yên Dũng
- Ward
- Location in Vietnam
- Coordinates: 21°12′15″N 106°14′47″E
- Country: Vietnam
- City: Bắc Ninh

Area
  - Total: 8.48 sq mi (21.96 km^{2})

Population (2018)
  - Total: 14,220
  - Density: 1,680/sq mi (648/km^{2})
- Time zone: UTC+07:00

Yên Dũng is a ward (phường) of Bắc Ninh, in north-eastern Vietnam.
