= Nghĩa Phương, Bắc Ninh =

Coordinates: 21°16′N 106°28′E

Nghĩa Phương
- Commune and village
- Interactive map of Nghĩa Phương
- Country: Vietnam
- City: Bắc Ninh
- Time zone: UTC+07:00

Nghĩa Phương is a commune (xã) in Bắc Ninh, in northeastern Vietnam.
