= Trường Sơn, Bắc Ninh =

Coordinates: 18°23′N 105°44′E

Trường Sơn
- Commune
- Interactive map of Trường Sơn
- Country: Vietnam
- City: Bắc Ninh

Area
  - Total: 28.01 sq mi (72.55 km^{2})

Population (2024)
  - Total: 18,634
  - Density: 665.2/sq mi (256.8/km^{2})
- Time zone: UTC+7 (UTC+7)
- Postal code: 07507

Trường Sơn is a commune (xã) in Bắc Ninh, in northeastern Vietnam.
