= Yên Định, Bắc Ninh =

Coordinates: 21.3350°N 106.7931°E

Yên Định
- Commune
- Interactive map of Yên Định
- Country: Vietnam
- City: Bắc Ninh
- Time zone: UTC+07:00

Yên Định is a commune (xã) in Bắc Ninh, in northeastern Vietnam.
