= Tân An, Bắc Ninh =

Coordinates: 21.2600°N 106.2681°E

Tân An
- Ward
- Interactive map of Tân An
- Country: Vietnam
- City: Bắc Ninh

Area
  - Total: 3.53 sq mi (9.15 km^{2})

Population
  - Total: 9,966
  - Density: 2,820/sq mi (1,089/km^{2})
- Time zone: UTC+07:00

Tân An is a ward (phường) of Bắc Ninh city, in northeastern Vietnam.
