= Vân Hà, Bắc Ninh =

Vân Hà
- Ward
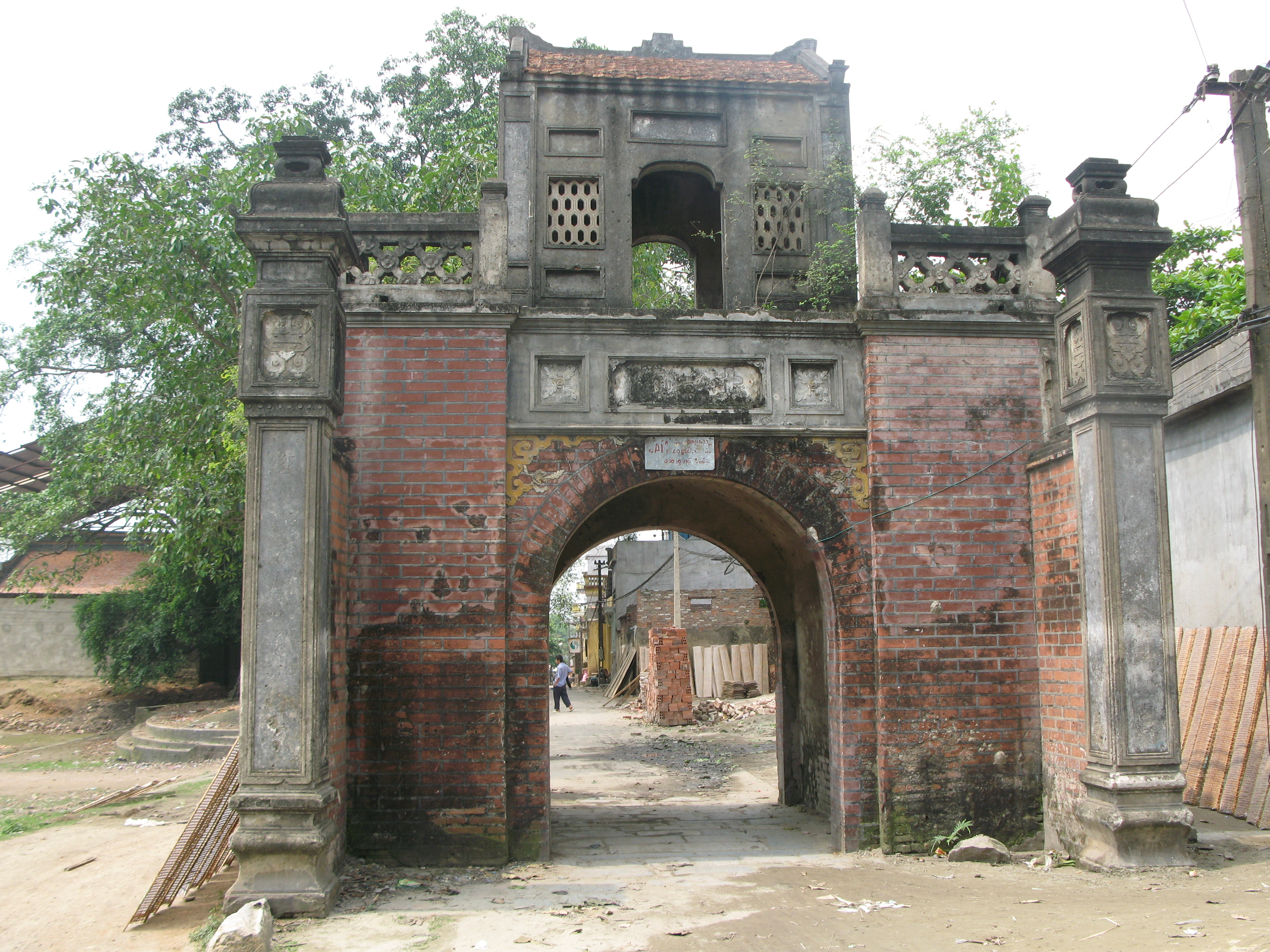
- Interactive map of Vân Hà
- Country: Vietnam
- City: Bắc Ninh
- Established: 16/06/2025[1]

Population (2024)
  - Total: 58,177
- Time zone: UTC+07:00

Vân Hà is a ward (phường) in Bắc Ninh, in northeastern Vietnam.
