= Đông Phú, Bắc Ninh =

Coordinates: 21°21′24″N 106°25′26″E

Đông Phú
- Commune and village
- Interactive map of Đông Phú
- Country: Vietnam
- City: Bắc Ninh
- Time zone: UTC+07:00

Đông Phú is a commune (xã) in Bắc Ninh, in northeastern Vietnam. It is one of the 99 new wards and communes of the province following the reorganization in 2025.

The Standing Committee of the National Assembly issued Resolution No. 1658/NQ-UBTVQH15 on the arrangement of commune-level administrative units in Bắc Ninh province in 2025, which took effect on June 16, 2025. Accordingly, the entire natural area and population of Đông Hưng Commune and Đông Phú Commune were merged to form a new commune named Đông Phú Commune.
