= Sơn Hải, Bắc Ninh =

Coordinates: 11°25′N 109°00′E

Sơn Hải
- Commune and village
- Interactive map of Sơn Hải
- Country: Vietnam
- City: Bắc Ninh
- Time zone: UTC+07:00

Sơn Hải is a commune (xã) and village in Bắc Ninh, in northeastern Vietnam.
