= Đèo Gia =

- Commune and village
- Location in Vietnam
- Coordinates: 21°19′11″N 106°41′43″E
- Country: Vietnam
- City: Bắc Ninh
- Time zone: UTC+07:00

Đèo Gia is a commune (xã) and village in Bắc Ninh, in northeastern Vietnam.
