= Quỳnh Sơn =

- Commune
- Interactive map of Quỳnh Sơn
- Coordinates: 19.15903271672937°N 105.6129498363992°E
- Country: Vietnam
- Region: North Central Coast
- Province: Nghệ An
- Established: 16 June 2025

Area
  - Total: 61.21 km^{2} (23.63 sq mi)

Population (2025)
  - Total: 36,834
  - Density: 601/km^{2} (1,560/sq mi)

Quỳnh Sơn is a commune in Nghệ An province, Vietnam.

On 16 June 2025, Quỳnh Sơn commune was established under Resolution No. 1678/NQ-UBTVQH15, issued by the Standing Committee of the National Assembly of Vietnam. Under the resolution, the entire area and population of Ngọc Sơn, Quỳnh Lâm, and Quỳnh Sơn communes, formerly part of Quỳnh Lưu district, were merged to form a new commune named Quỳnh Sơn.
