= Nhã Nam =

Coordinates: 21°27′N 106°06′E

- Commune
- Interactive map of Nhã Nam
- Country: Vietnam
- City: Bắc Ninh

Area
  - Total: 2.16 sq mi (5.59 km^{2})
- Time zone: UTC+07:00

Nhã Nam is a commune (xã) in Bắc Ninh, in northeastern Vietnam.

On June 16, 2025, the Standing Committee of the National Assembly issued Resolution No. 1658/NQ-UBTVQH15 regarding the arrangement of commune-level administrative units in Bắc Ninh Province in 2025. Accordingly, the entire natural area and population of Nhã Nam township and the communes of Tân Trung, Liên Sơn, and An Dương were reorganized to form a new commune named Nhã Nam.
