= Quang Trung, Bắc Ninh =

Coordinates: 21°26′00″N 106°03′30″E

Quang Trung Xã Quang Trung
- Commune and village
- Interactive map of Quang Trung
- Country: Vietnam
- City: Bắc Ninh
- Time zone: UTC+07:00

Quang Trung is a commune (xã) and village in Bắc Ninh, in northeastern Vietnam.
