= Ngọc Thiện =

Coordinates: 21.3481°N 106.0772°E

- Commune and village
- Interactive map of Ngọc Thiện
- Country: Vietnam
- City: Bắc Ninh
- Time zone: UTC+07:00

Ngọc Thiện is a commune (xã) and village in Bắc Ninh, in northeastern Vietnam. it is contiguous with the smaller location of Ải Thôn to the northeast.

On June 16, 2025, the Standing Committee of the National Assembly issued Resolution No. 1658/NQ-UBTVQH15 regarding the arrangement of commune-level administrative units in Bắc Ninh Province in 2025. Accordingly, the entire natural area and population of the communes of Song Vân, Ngọc Châu, Ngọc Vân, Việt Ngọc, and Ngọc Thiện were reorganized to form a new commune named Ngọc Thiện.
