= Cẩm Lý =

Coordinates: 21°14′N 106°20′E

- Commune and village
- Interactive map of Cẩm Lý
- Country: Vietnam
- City: Bắc Ninh
- Time zone: UTC+07:00

Cẩm Lý is a commune (xã) and village in Bắc Ninh, in northeastern Vietnam.
