= Tự Lạn =

Coordinates: 21.2994°N 106.0736°E

- Ward
- Interactive map of Tự Lạn
- Country: Vietnam
- City: Bắc Ninh
- Time zone: UTC+07:00
- Website: tulan.bacninh.gov.vn

Tự Lạn is a ward (phường) in Bắc Ninh Province, in northeastern Vietnam.
