= Phúc Hòa, Bắc Ninh =

Coordinates: 22°32′N 106°31′E

Phúc Hòa
- Commune and village
- Interactive map of Phúc Hòa
- Country: Vietnam
- City: Bắc Ninh
- Time zone: UTC+07:00

Phúc Hòa is a commune (xã) and village in Bắc Ninh, in northeastern Vietnam.
