= Biên Sơn =

- Commune and village
- Location in Vietnam
- Coordinates: 20°05′N 105°52′E
- Country: Vietnam
- City: Bắc Ninh
- Time zone: UTC+7 (UTC+7)
- Website: bienson.bacninh.gov.vn

Biên Sơn is a commune (xã) and village in Bắc Ninh, in northeastern Vietnam.
