= Đồng Việt =

Coordinates: 21.1558°N 106.3053°E

- Commune and village
- Interactive map of Đồng Việt
- Country: Vietnam
- City: Bắc Ninh
- Time zone: UTC+07:00

Đồng Việt is a commune (xã) and village in Bắc Ninh, in northeastern Vietnam.
