= Tiên Lục =

Coordinates: 21°24′00″N 106°12′12″E

- Commune and village
- Interactive map of Tiên Lục
- Country: Vietnam
- City: Bắc Ninh
- Time zone: UTC+07:00

Tiên Lục is a commune (xã) and village in Bắc Ninh, in northeastern Vietnam.
