= Phượng Sơn =

Coordinates: 21°19′50″N 106°28′17″E

- Ward and village
- Interactive map of Phượng Sơn
- Country: Vietnam
- City: Bắc Ninh
- Time zone: UTC+07:00
- Website: phuongson.bacninh.gov.vn

Phượng Sơn is a ward (phường) in Bắc Ninh city, in northeastern Vietnam.
