= Nam Dương =

Coordinates: 20°41′N 105°46′E

- Commune and village
- Interactive map of Nam Dương
- Country: Vietnam
- City: Bắc Ninh
- Time zone: UTC+07:00

Nam Dương is a commune (xã) in Bắc Ninh city, in northeastern Vietnam.

== History ==
In early 1955, Trù Hựu commune was divided into five communes: Mỹ An, Nghĩa Hồ, Phượng Sơn, Trù Hựu A, and Trù Hựu B.

On 21 January 1957, the Prime Minister issued Decree No. 24-TTg dividing Sơn Động and Lục Ngạn districts into three districts: Sơn Động, Lục Ngạn, and Lục Nam. At that time, Trù Hựu B commune was part of Lục Ngạn district.

On 14 June 1958, the Ministry of the Interior issued Decree No. 202-NV renaming Trù Hựu B commune as Nam Dương commune.

On 27 October 1962, the National Assembly adopted a resolution establishing Hà Bắc province from Bắc Giang and Bắc Ninh provinces. At that time, Nam Dương commune was part of Lục Ngạn district, Hà Bắc province.

On 6 November 1996, the National Assembly adopted a resolution dividing Hà Bắc Province into Bắc Giang and Bắc Ninh provinces. At that time, Trù Hựu commune was part of Lục Ngạn district, Bắc Giang province.

On 5 June 2013, the Ministry of Construction issued Decision No. 567/QĐ-BXD recognizing the expanded Chũ township, comprising Chũ township, Nghĩa Hồ commune, and parts of Quý Sơn, Thanh Hải, Trù Hựu, and Nam Dương communes, as a class-IV urban area.

On 28 September 2024, the Standing Committee of the National Assembly issued Resolution No. 1191/NQ-UBTVQH15 on the arrangement of district- and commune-level administrative units in Bắc Giang province for the 2023–2025 period, which took effect on 1 January 2025. Accordingly, Nam Dương commune was transferred from Lục Ngạn District to the newly established Chũ town.

On 12 June 2025, the National Assembly adopted Resolution No. 202/2025/QH15 on the rearrangement of provincial-level administrative units, which took effect on 12 June 2025. Accordingly, the entire area and population of Bắc Giang province and Bắc Ninh province were merged to form a new province named Bắc Ninh.

On 16 June 2025:

- The National Assembly promulgated Resolution No. 203/2025/QH15 amending and supplementing a number of articles of the Constitution of the Socialist Republic of Vietnam, which took effect on 16 June 2025. Accordingly, district-level administrative units throughout Vietnam ceased to operate from 1 July 2025.
- The Standing Committee of the National Assembly promulgated Resolution No. 1658/NQ-UBTVQH15 on the arrangement of commune-level administrative units in Bắc Ninh province in 2025, which took effect on 16 June 2025. Accordingly, the entire area and population of Tân Mộc and Nam Dương communes were merged to form a new commune named Nam Dương.

On 24 August 2026, the National Assembly adopted Resolution No. 39/2026/QH16 establishing Bắc Ninh city on the basis of the entire area and population of Bắc Ninh Province. The resolution took effect on 20 September 2026. Nam Dương commune consequently became part of Bắc Ninh city.
