= Kiên Lao =

Coordinates: 21°25′33″N 106°31′14″E

- Commune and village
- Interactive map of Kiên Lao
- Country: Vietnam
- City: Bắc Ninh
- Time zone: UTC+07:00

Kiên Lao is a commune (xã) and village in Bắc Ninh, in northeastern Vietnam.
