= Tiền Phong, Bắc Ninh =

Coordinates: 21°13′54″N 106°10′11″E

Tiền Phong
- Ward
- Interactive map of Tiền Phong
- Country: Vietnam
- City: Bắc Ninh
- Time zone: UTC+07:00
- Website: tienphong.bacninh.gov.vn

Tiền Phong is a ward (phường) in Bắc Ninh Province, in northeastern Vietnam.
