= Tân Tiến, Bắc Ninh =

Tân Tiến
- Ward
- Interactive map of Tân Tiến
- Coordinates: 21°15′20″N 106°14′35″E
- Country: Vietnam
- City: Bắc Ninh
- Established: 01/01/2025

Area
  - Total: 9.83 sq mi (25.46 km^{2})

Population
  - Total: 34,321
  - Density: 3,491/sq mi (1,348/km^{2})
- Time zone: UTC+07:00
- Postal code: 07699
- Website: tantien.bacninh.gov.vn

Tân Tiến is a ward (phường) of Bắc Ninh city in the Northeast region of Vietnam.
