= Operation Wheeler/Wallowa =

Part of the Vietnam War (1967–1968)

- Part of the Vietnam War
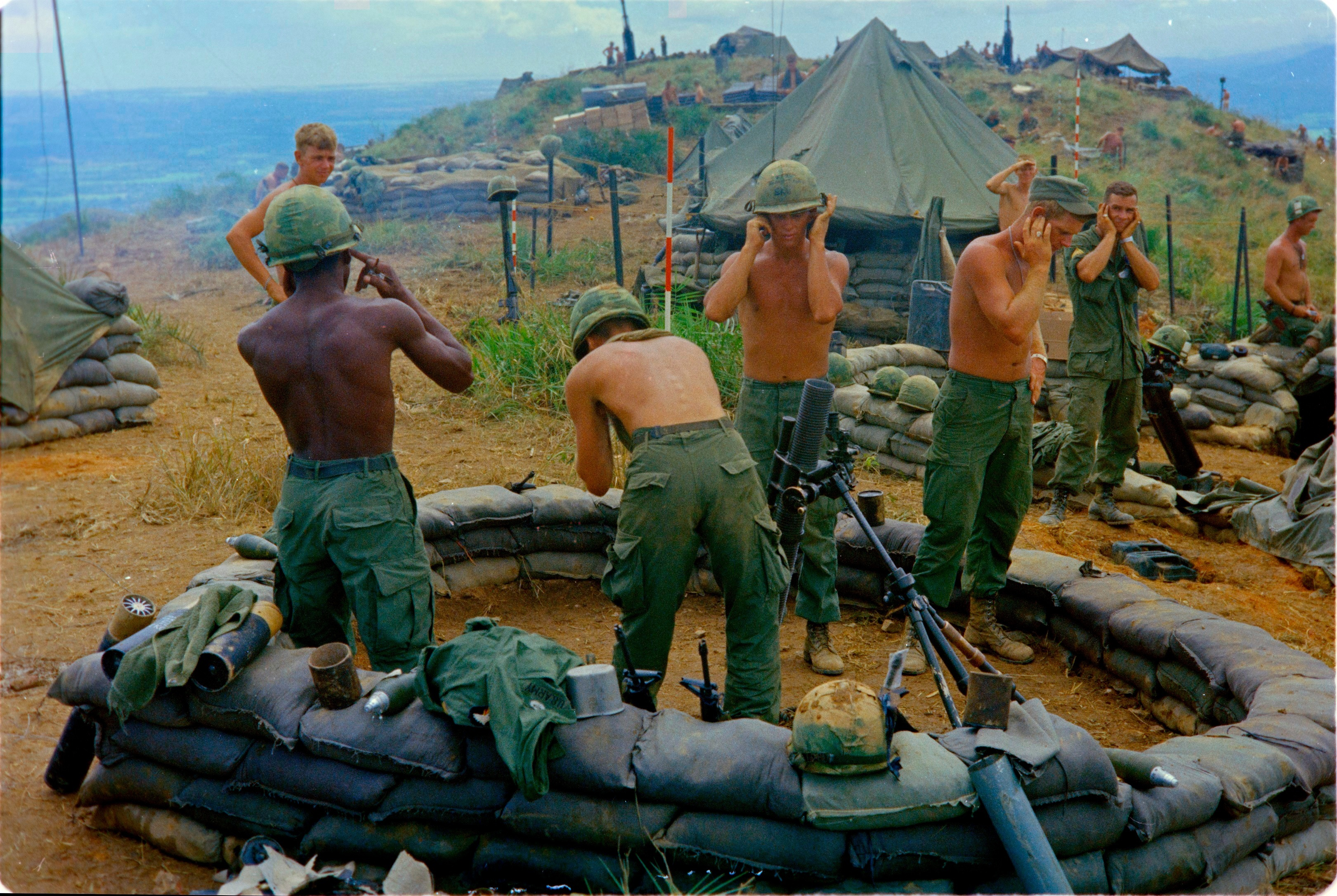
- 101st Airborne 81mm mortar crew firing during Operation Wheeler
Date	11 September 1967 – 11 November 1968 (1 year and 2 months)
Location	Hiệp Đức District-Quế Sơn Valley, South Vietnam
Result	Inconclusive

Belligerents
United States	North Vietnam

Commanders and leaders
MG Samuel W. Koster	Lê Hữu Trữ †; Giáp Văn Cương

Units involved
101st Airborne Division: 1st Brigade CT; 1st Cavalry Division: 3rd Brigade CT	2nd Division

Casualties and losses
682 killed	Per US body count claim: 10,008 killed 600 weapons recovered (up to January 1968)

Operation Wheeler/Wallowa was a U.S. offensive operation during the Vietnam War, launched on 11 September 1967 as two separate operations and concluding in November 1968. Initially named Operation Wheeler and Wallowa, they were merged in November 1967 as Wheeler/Wallowa. The operation was at first conducted by the 101st Airborne Division and 1st Cavalry Division, but it was progressively taken over by 23rd Infantry (Americal) Division.

Some of the Tiger Force killings took place during the operation.

== Operation ==
Operation Wheeler/Wallowa was launched as part of the operations conducted by Task Force Oregon, a multi-brigade force of the U.S. Army, made up of the 1st Brigade, 101st Airborne Division; and the 3rd Brigade, 25th Infantry Division, with its headquarters at Chu Lai Base Area. Its objective was to "blunt" the offensive by the People's Army of Vietnam (PAVN) 2nd Division, and allow units of the 1st Marine Division to relocate to Da Nang. Shortly after the Task Force became operational, Brigadier General Samuel W. Koster took command. Three days later, the Task Force was reconstituted as the 23rd Infantry (Americal) Division. Wheeler/Wallowa actually started as two separate operations, which were merged in November 1967.

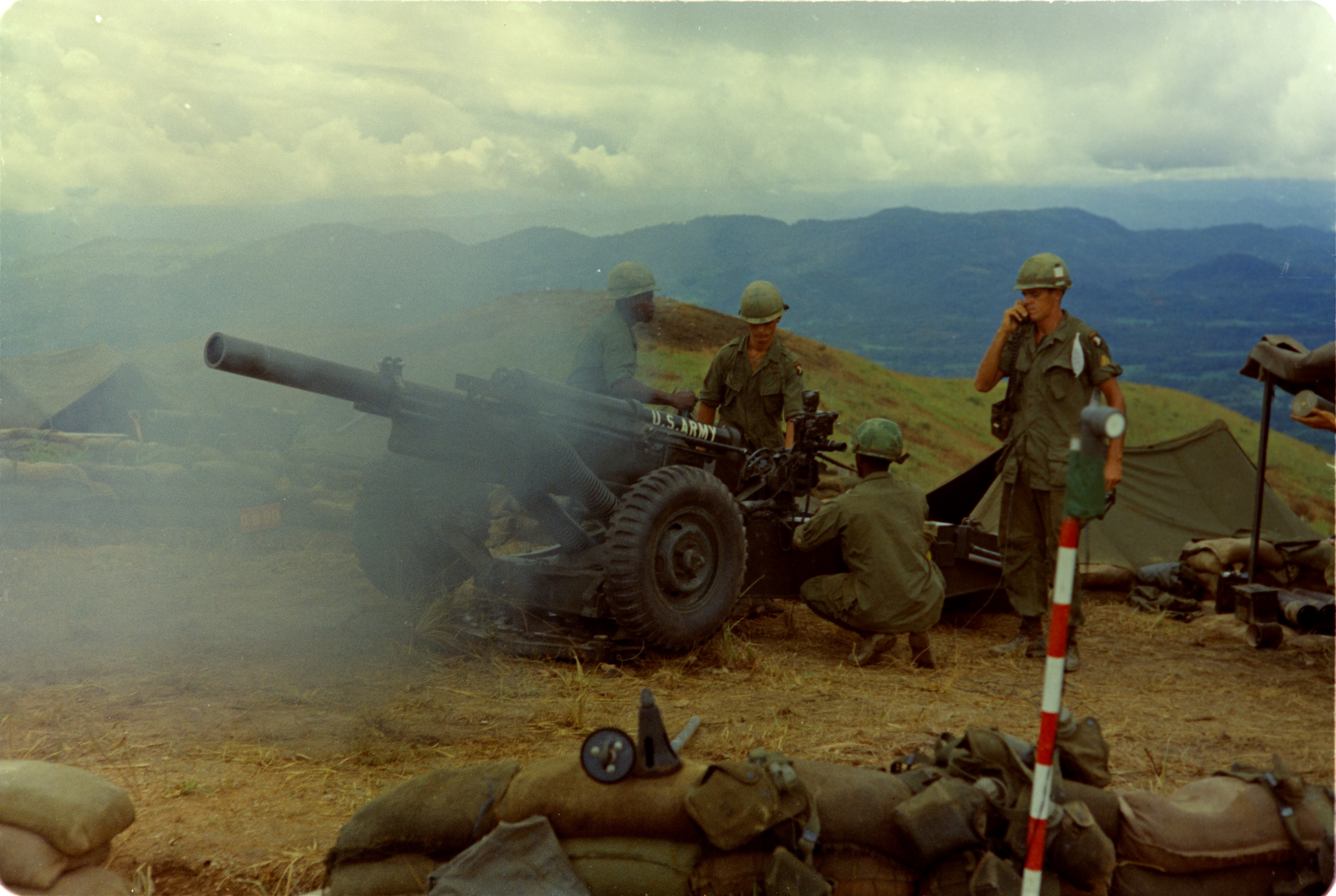
101st Airborne gunners firing 105 mm howitzer during the operation

=== Operation Wheeler ===
Operation Wheeler was launched on 11 September 1967, under the control of the 1st Brigade, 101st Airborne Division commanded by Brigadier General Salve H. Matheson. It was launched against the PAVN 2nd Division to the northwest of Chu Lai. The operation was essentially a series of assaults and search-and-destroy missions against the 2nd Division. The operation was coordinated with the U.S. Marine Corps/Army of the Republic of Vietnam (ARVN) Operation Swift/Lien Ket 116 in the Quế Sơn Valley. In early October, Matheson gained control over the 1st Battalion, 35th Infantry Regiment, which left the 3rd Brigade, 4th Infantry Division at Đức Phổ Base Camp in southern Quảng Ngãi Province for the Wheeler area of operations.

=== Operation Wallowa ===
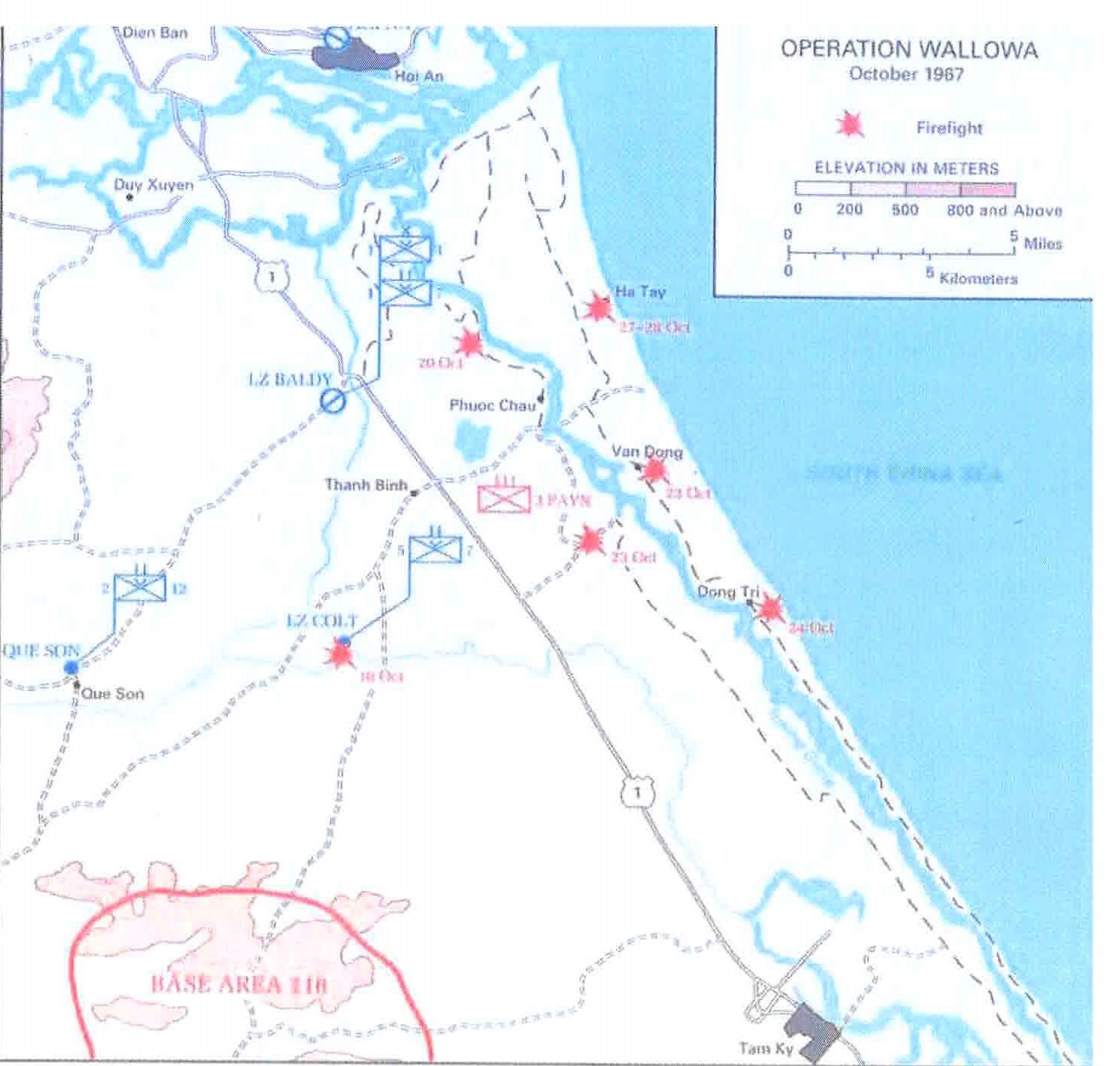
Operation Wallowa October 1967

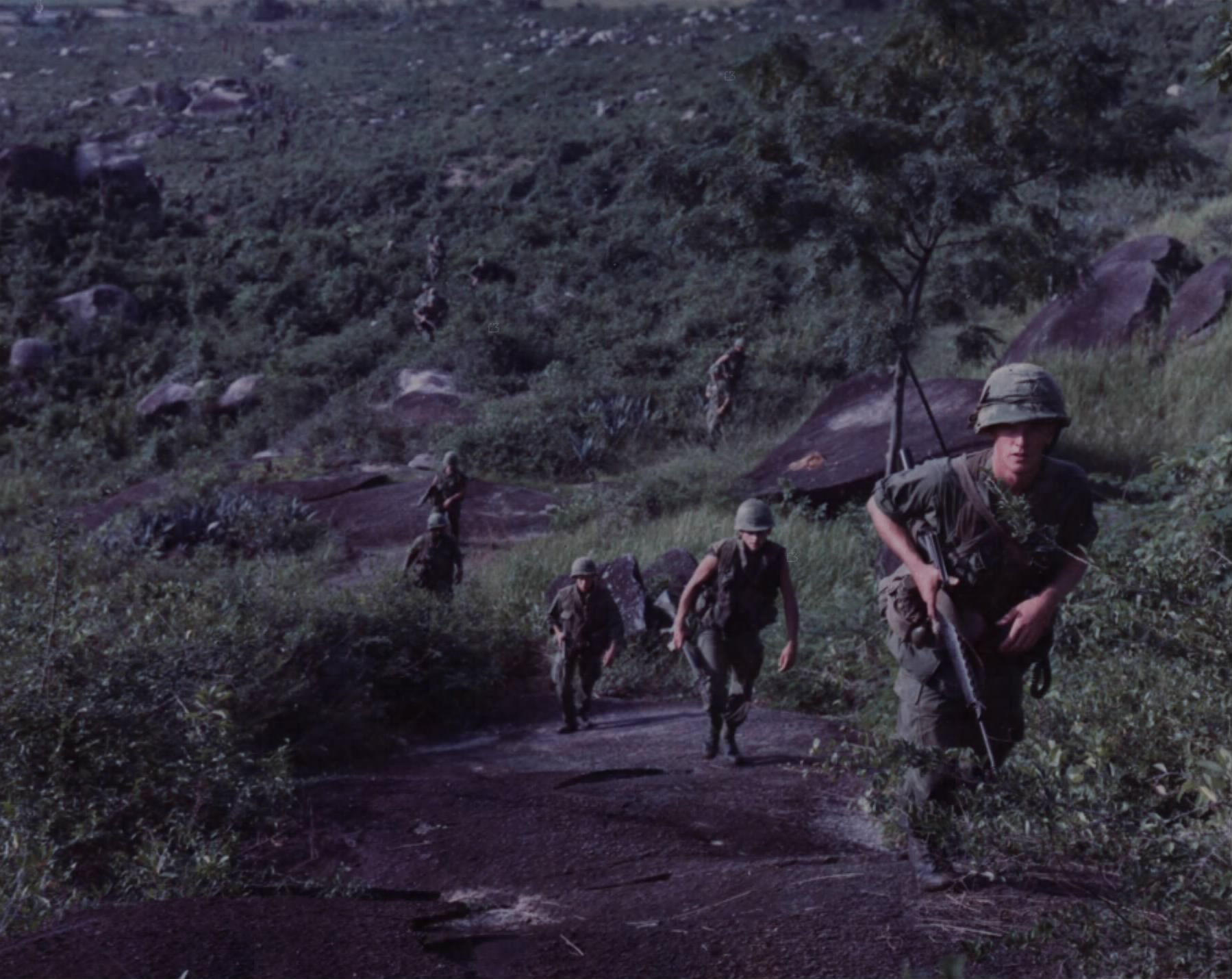
Men of "A" Company, 2nd Battalion, 12th Cavalry climb a slope outside of LZ Ross, 25 October 1967

Operation Wallowa was launched on 4 October 1967 under the control of the 3rd Brigade, 1st Cavalry Division, when it replaced the 1st Brigade, 101st Airborne Division and two battalions of the 3rd Brigade, 4th Infantry Division. The operation involved intensive surveillance of the Hiệp Đức District-Quế Sơn Valley. Small units were combat assaulted into the area to find the PAVN prior to the insertion of ready reaction forces. Led by Colonel Hubert S. Campbell, the 3rd Brigade established its main base at Landing Zone Baldy, positioned on Highway 1 at the mouth of the valley near the Thăng Bình District, some 11 kilometres (6.8 mi) south of Hội An.

Aided by mild weather that rarely curtailed flying, their Huey gunships found plentiful targets since the PAVN troops in the Quế Sơn Valley, accustomed to fighting marines who had few helicopters, were used to moving around during the day. By the end of October, Koster could boast that his two brigades had drawn at least five of the 2nd Division's nine battalions into combat and that they had killed or captured more than 1,600 soldiers. Despite its losses, the 2nd Division refused to leave the Quế Sơn Valley. On 8 November, troops from the 3rd Regiment used a dozen or more carefully concealed 75 mm recoilless rifles to ambush a column of armored personnel carriers from the Americal Division's reconnaissance unit, the 1st Squadron, 1st Cavalry, near Landing Zone Ross, a battalion camp for the 3rd Brigade, 1st Cavalry Division, located 15 kilometres (9.3 mi) northwest of Hiệp Đức. The attack cost the Americans 10 killed and 46 wounded, as well as four armored personnel carriers destroyed. The 1/1st Cavalry, found three of the 75mm recoilless rifles and 45 PAVN dead when it searched the battlefield the next day. The clash produced disquieting intelligence, a captured PAVN soldier reported that two battalions from the PAVN 68th Artillery Regiment, a unit armed with 122 mm rockets, had recently moved into the hills overlooking the Quế Sơn Valley. Although the weapons were inaccurate, they had a 12 kilometres (7.5 mi) range and their warheads packed a substantial punch. If the prisoner's report was true, that would give the 2nd Division a long-distance striking power it had formerly lacked and would put American bases at greater risk. Koster could not allow the rocket threat to go unchecked. To find the PAVN before he struck, Koster turned to his aerial reconnaissance teams, a combination of OH–23 scout helicopters and UH–1 Hueys that carried six-man reconnaissance squads. Now familiar with US airmobile tactics, the PAVN initiated countermeasures. On 13 November, machine gun fire brought down a Huey carrying a Blue Team in a rice paddy southeast of LZ Ross. When a trio of helicopters flew in to rescue the downed aircrew, as many as six PAVN 12.7mm machine guns concealed on a nearby knoll opened fire. The effect was devastating. One helicopter exploded in midair and two more were forced to make emergency landings. The 2nd Division had executed its first preplanned helicopter ambush. The commander of the 101st Airborne's 1st Brigade, General Matheson, ordered the commander of the 1/35th Infantry, Lieutenant colonel Robert G. Kimmel, to mount a relief operation to save the downed aircrews. After suppressing the nest of machine guns with air and artillery strikes, the colonel landed three rifle companies into the area to establish a perimeter around the downed Hueys before night fell. The following morning, Kimmel flew out in his command helicopter to direct the sweep for the PAVN ambushers. While his men were beating the bushes and inspecting hamlets, a concealed PAVN machine gun opened fire on Kimmel's aircraft, severing its main rotor blade. The subsequent crash killed everyone on board, including Kimmel. His battalion continued its mission, later passing to the control of Lieutenant colonel Marion C. Ross when he arrived with his 2nd Battalion, 12th Cavalry, later that afternoon. Neither battalion regained contact with the enemy, prompting Ross to terminate the mission two days later. US casualties came to 22 killed and 28 wounded. PAVN fire had hit over 20 helicopters, eight of which were destroyed or severely damaged, PAVN losses were unknown. The Americal Division changed its operational doctrine in the wake of that incident, mandating that ground units spearhead future rescue efforts rather than helicopter rescue teams.

=== Operation Wheeler/Wallowa ===
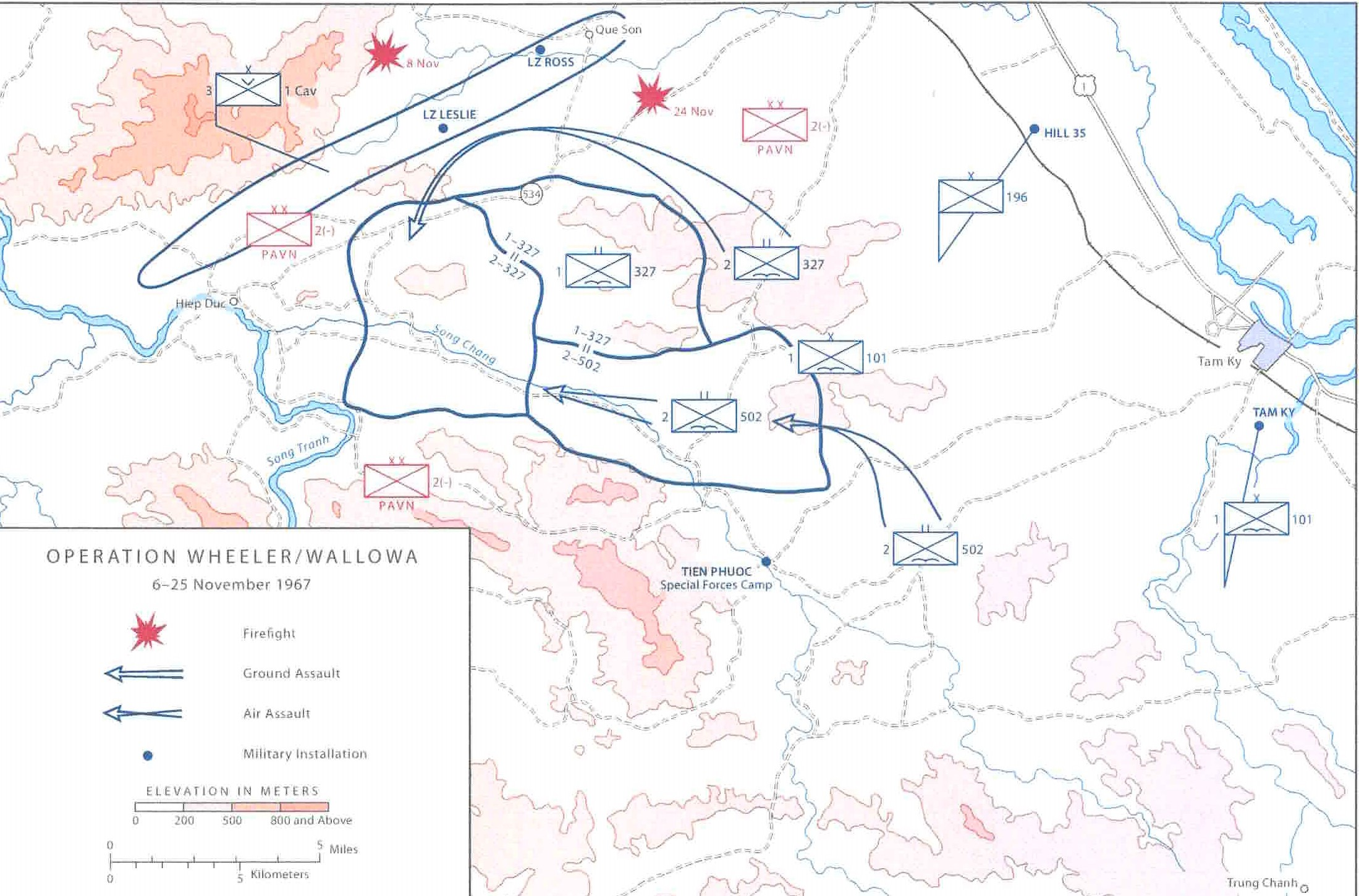
Operation Wheeler/Wallowa, 6–23 November 1967

On 11 November, Koster combined Operation Wheeler with Operation Wallowa to simplify command and control arrangements as the mix of American units began to change in the valley. A week later, the 198th Infantry Brigade (Light) moved from Đức Phổ to Chu Lai, relieving the 196th Infantry Brigade, which moved into the southern part of the Wheeler-Wallowa zone. With the arrival of Gelling's brigade, Matheson flew his 1st Brigade, 101st Airborne Division, down to Phan Rang Air Base for a month-long mission in southern II Corps.

On 22 November a US radio research unit picked up a transmission apparently sent by the headquarters of the PAVN 3rd Regiment. Triangulation of the signal placed its origin at Hill 63, a small granite outcrop 7 kilometres (4.3 mi) east of LZ Ross. If the 3rd Regiment was indeed in the valley, Gelling's 198th Infantry Brigade had a rare opportunity to engage a major part of the 2nd Division. Gelling passed along the information to the executive officer of the 4th Battalion, 31st Infantry Regiment, Major Gilbert N. Dorland, who was on patrol near Ross with Companies B and D from his battalion, two platoons of armored personnel carriers from Troop F, 17th Cavalry and a platoon of tanks from Troop A, 1st Squadron, 1st Cavalry. It was too late in the day for Dorland to act on the tip, but he resolved to investigate the following morning. Task Force Dorland approached Hill 63 on the cool and cloudy morning of 23 November. Despite its modest height, the hillock offered a commanding view of the surrounding farmlands. Knowing that the PAVN sometimes used it as an observation point when they were gathering food, Dorland moved to investigate. Task Force Dorland split into two groups and approached the hill from opposite sides. When the American infantrymen began climbing its slopes at around 07:00, a torrent of small arms and machine-gun fire greeted them from concealed positions higher on the hill. Four US soldiers were killed and another 11 wounded during the opening phase of the battle. The volume of fire led Dorland to conclude that at least one battalion from the 3rd Regiment held the hill. As Companies B and D fought their way up the northern and southern slopes, Dorland led a group of M48 tanks and M113 armored personnel carriers around the hill to establish a blocking position on its western side. When the mechanized group reached its destination, a platoon of PAVN soldiers emerged from the tall grass near the base of the hill, fired at the Americans, and then sprinted west to a hedgerow-enclosed hamlet some 200 metres (220 yd) away and Troop F pursued. Moments later, recoilless rifles concealed in the hamlet opened fire on the troopers. PAVN rounds slammed into two armored personnel carriers, including the one carrying Dorland. He was thrown from his vehicle and then badly injured when the carrier ran over his body. Despite his pain, Dorland refused painkillers or medical evacuation so he could return to the fight. While Dorland's armored vehicles fought back with machine guns and cannon, his two infantry companies fought their way up Hill 63. It was slow and costly work, with the companies sustaining some 50 casualties in the first two hours of combat. Seeing he had a major fight on his hands, Dorland asked for help. Gelling sent Company B, 4th Battalion, 21st Infantry Regiment, which landed near the eastern side of Hill 63 around 09:15. Believing that the PAVN on Hill 63 was more or less trapped, Dorland ordered the 4/21st Infantry to seize the hamlet. Supported by several M48 tanks, Company B closed the intervening distance and entered the maze of hedgerows that enclosed the settlement. The infantrymen silenced several recoilless rifles, which allowed the tanks to begin destroying PAVN bunkers at close range, either with cannon fire or by crushing them underneath the weight of the vehicles. Back on Hill 63, Companies B and D, 4/31st Infantry, finally reached the summit, killing the last defender around noon. That accomplished, Dorland ordered both companies to march west and join the hamlet-clearing operation. Ninety minutes later, helicopters flew in Company C from Dorland's 4/31st Infantry, which also joined the battle. Confident that the four infantry companies and reinforced mechanized troop were taking care of matters, Dorland relinquished his command at around 15:00 and flew out by helicopter to receive some much-needed medical attention, he was later awarded the Distinguished Service Cross.

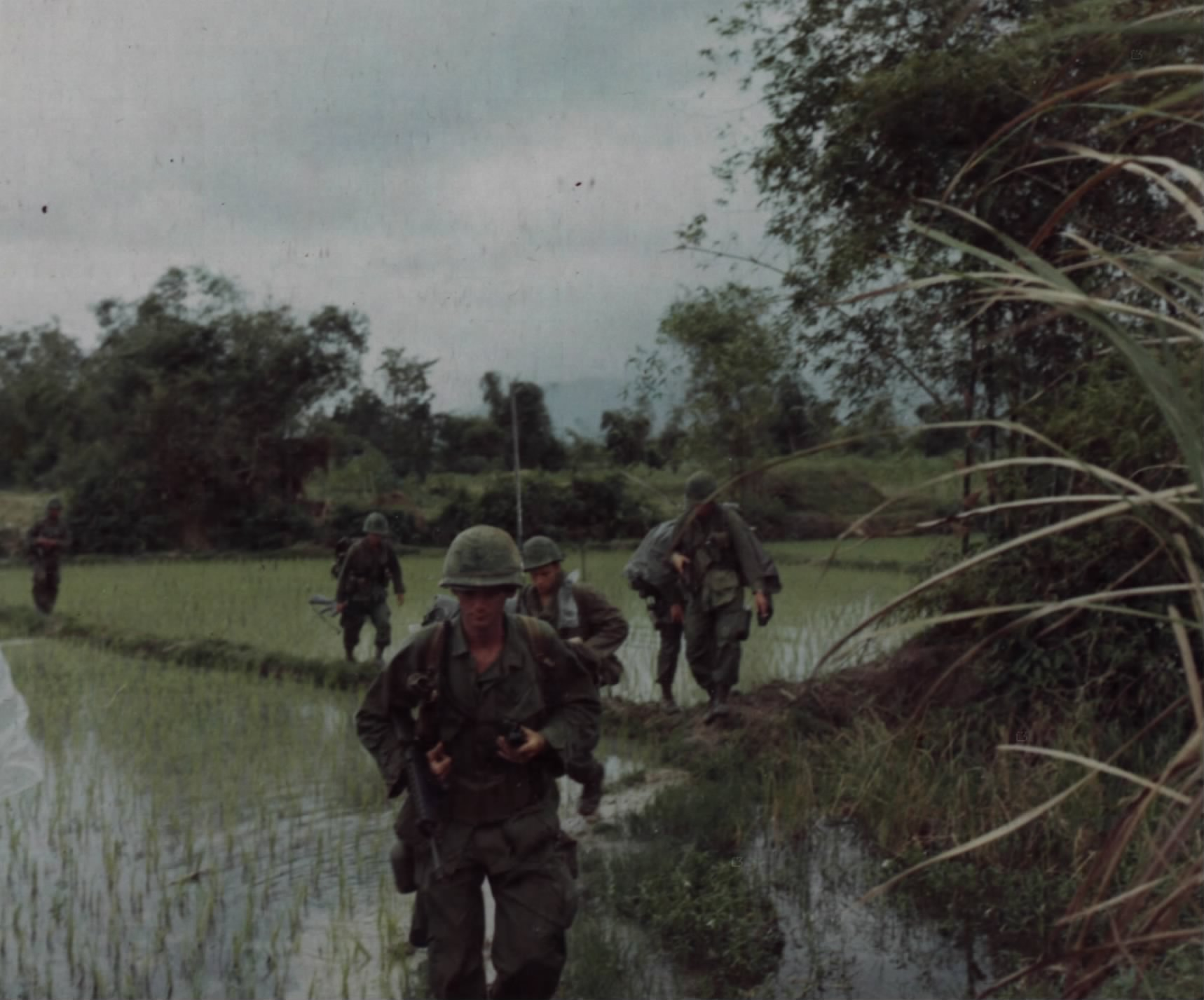
Members of Company "A", 1st Battalion, 7th Cavalry Regiment, move across rice paddies, 10 December 1967

The next day, Gelling flew in Company D, 3/21st Infantry, and Company B, 2nd Battalion, 1st Infantry Regiment, to search the area around Hill 63 for other 2nd Division elements, while the units already on the ground finished clearing the hamlet to its west. The PAVN abandoned the hamlet later that day and scattered to the east and south in small, fast-moving teams to complicate allied pursuit. Documents found on dead PAVN soldiers identified their unit as the 2nd Battalion, 3rd Regiment. Gelling's men reported that they had killed a total of 128 PAVN in the three-day battle for Hill 63 and its environs. Seven US soldiers had been killed (all in the first two hours of the first day) and 84 wounded. What mission the 3rd Regiment had been performing near Ross remained a mystery, but the Americal Division obtained more evidence a week later that something was afoot. On the afternoon of 5 December, an air cavalry troop commander assigned to support the 3rd Brigade, 1st Cavalry Division, was training a new gunship team from the 1st Squadron, 9th Cavalry, when he spotted some people on a ridge north of LZ Ross. After the helicopters made a low pass that identified them as PAVN, the two gunships opened fire and cut down several of the figures. A Blue Team landed on the ridge just a few minutes later and eliminated even more soldiers, bringing the total number of dead to 17. A search of their possessions revealed that they had been the command group of the 2nd Division, apparently caught while performing a reconnaissance mission against LZ Ross. Among the dead were the division commander, Colonel Trữ, the division's political officer, its deputy chief of staff, its chief of rear services, its chief of military operations and intelligence, its chief of combat operations and training and the commanders of the 3rd and 21st Regiments along with several of their battalion commanders. A notebook marked “Absolute Secret” and other documents recovered from the scene described a plan for a multi-regiment attack on LZ Ross. The plan emphasized the need to destroy a large number of US helicopters and discussed tactics that could be used to shoot them down. Although the document did not specify a date for the attack, it described a preparatory phase that was to end on 23 December. Therefore, US intelligence deduced that the attack would probably come just before or right after the customary Christmas truce. Taking the document at its word, Koster strengthened the 3rd Brigade's defenses at LZ Ross. He also reinforced Landing Zone Leslie, a smaller, company-size base 4 kilometres (2.5 mi) to the southwest. Most significantly, he stationed a troop of M113s from the 1st Squadron, 1st Cavalry, at Ross, giving the base a hard-hitting reaction force. Koster learned more about the 2nd Division's plans on 9 December, when his main air reconnaissance element, Troop B of the 1/9th Cavalry, spotted a battalion-size group of PAVN 5 kilometres (3.1 mi) northwest of LZ Baldy. After air and artillery strikes had pounded the location, several companies from the 1/35th Infantry, moved in to engage the PAVN. The day-long battle resulted in the deaths of 121 PAVN. Ten more soldiers who were taken prisoner said they had been part of a food-gathering party from the 1st and 3rd Regiments. According to their reports, the headquarters of the 2nd Division was trying to accumulate a month's worth of rice so it could conduct a major operation in the Quế Sơn Valley. Over the next several weeks, Troop B of the 1/9th Cavalry saw no more sign of the 2nd Division. Its only major contact during that period came on 14 December, when gunships spotted troops from the 70th Main Force Battalion and the V15 Local Force Company on the coastal plain east of Baldy. The helicopters killed 58 VC with help from the 5th Battalion, 7th Cavalry, but a search of the dead produced no additional clues about the intentions of the 2nd Division.

On 23 December signals analysts reported that the 2nd Division had assumed an "alert posture", a strong indication that a major attack was in the offing. Helicopters and reconnaissance teams scoured the valley, but they found no sign of the enemy. US intelligence concluded that the 2nd Division had probably canceled the attack after the Americal Division had captured a copy of their plans on 5 December, but Koster was not so sure. Even though the B1 Front must have known that its plan had been compromised, MACV had released portions of it to the media on 6 December, Koster knew that the PAVN were desperate to regain control of the Quế Sơn Valley to feed their troops. PAVN soldiers had already raided villages along the periphery of the valley, but the amount of rice they had collected was not enough to feed the 2nd Division. Trusting his instincts, Koster directed the two brigades in the Quế Sơn Valley to assume that the PAVN was still planning a major attack in the near future. Koster's hunch proved correct. Even though the B1 Front commander, Major general Chu Huy Mân, wished to call off the attack and give the 2nd Division a rest prior to the upcoming Tet general offensive and uprising, he went ahead with the plan because he had orders from the North Vietnamese Ministry of Defense to cripple the 3rd Brigade, 1st Cavalry Division, and to tie it down prior to the great offensive set to begin in less than a month. Although his staff was already swamped with preparations for Tet, Mân sent cadres from his headquarters to replace the decimated 2nd Division command group. Senior Colonel Giáp Văn Cương, Mân's chief of staff and a former commander of the 3rd Division, became the 2nd Division's new commander. Cương and his staff had no time to change the plan so they went ahead with the existing scheme to attack LZ Ross. Cương could only hope that the Americans would drop their guard once the original attack date of 23 December passed without incident. On 26 December, three PAVN soldiers from the 2nd Division surrendered and informed their captors that a multi-regiment attack would take place against LZs Ross and Baldy in the near future. More evidence that an attack was imminent came five days later when the radios of the 2nd Division fell silent. In the past, a sudden break in radio traffic often signaled that a big attack was near. To preempt the long-anticipated blow, Koster on 2 January directed the 3rd Brigade, 1st Cavalry Division, to scour the area around Ross with helicopter-borne infantry. Early that day, a company from the 2nd Battalion, 12th Cavalry, drew heavy fire when it landed into a rice paddy west of LZ Ross. A second company reinforced the first, and the two units remained in heavy contact with the enemy until dark. The Americans killed 24 PAVN and took two prisoners. The prisoners claimed that they had just come out of the mountains to the northwest with at least a thousand other troops, had seen numerous antiaircraft weapons, and had passed an artillery position containing six 122 mm rocket launchers. Also during that day, US engineers found and destroyed a large number of mines on the road between Ross and Leslie, a route that had formerly seen little mining activity. On the basis of those reports and the continued radio silence, the 3rd Brigade, 1st Cavalry Division, went on full alert.

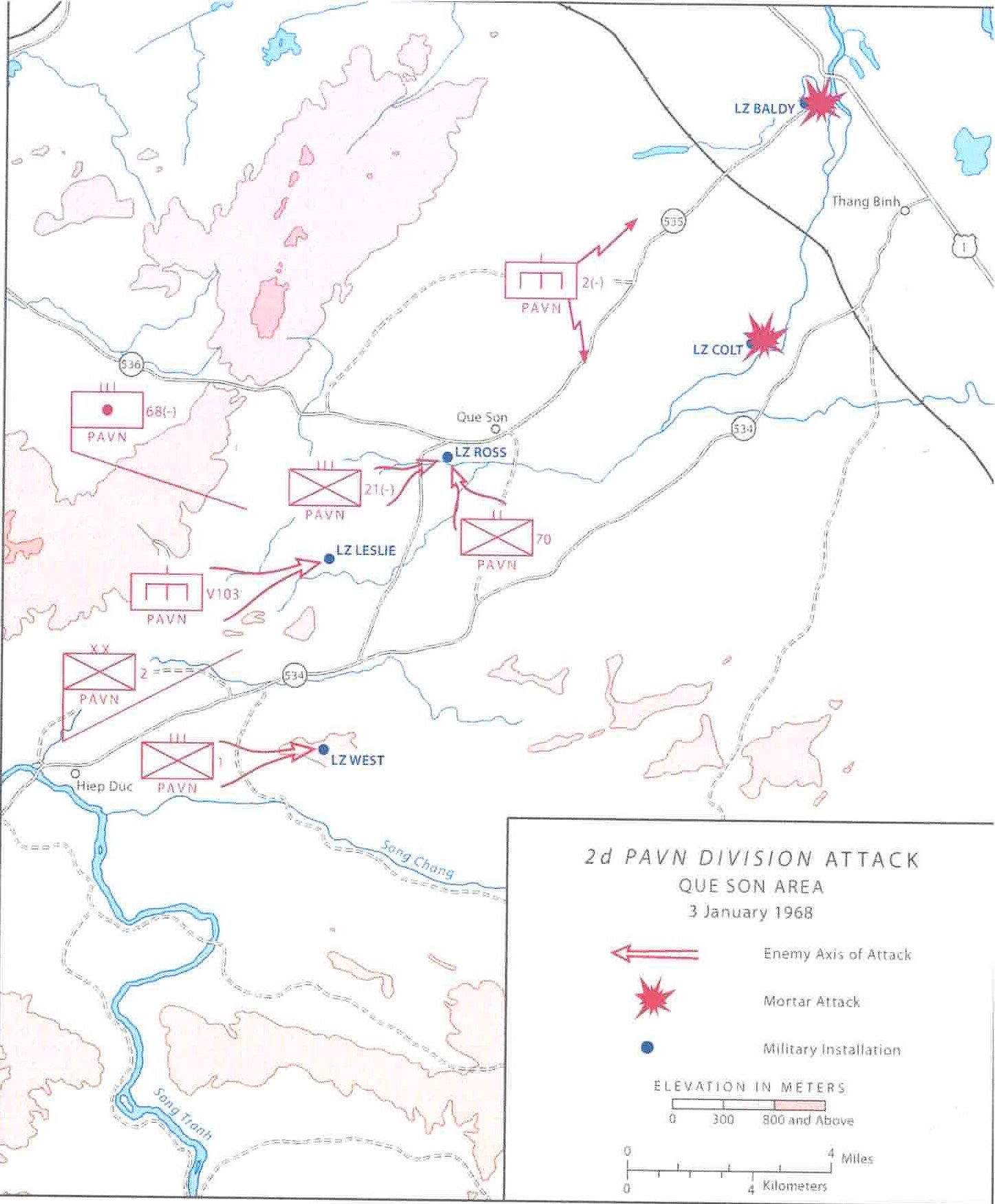
Que Son Valley, 3 January 1968

On the night of 2 January 1968, PAVN forces north and south of the Quế Sơn Valley carried out a series of diversionary attacks to support the plan of the 2nd Division. Two VC battalions assaulted a district headquarters in Quảng Ngãi Province, while a battalion of sappers raided a district headquarters in Quảng Tín Province, both attacks failed. Mân's troops fared better in Quảng Nam Province, where they conducted 25 attacks in seven of the province's nine districts and subjected Da Nang Air Base to a rocket barrage. A few of the smaller assaults fared well, as the VC overran the Hieu Duc District headquarters and destroyed a Marine Combined Action Platoon in Hieu Nhon District, but the more ambitious efforts fizzled. An attempt to seize an ARVN artillery base miscarried, while the attack on Da Nang, for all its violence, inflicted only slight damage on the base. Mân launched his main attack in the Quế Sơn Valley at 01:45 on 3 January. Although the 196th Infantry Brigade's Landing Zone West (15.583°N 108.183°E), 10 kilometres (6.2 mi) south of Ross, and several other bases in the valley came under mortar attack, Ross and the smaller Leslie bore the brunt of the assault, sustaining at least 250 rounds from 82 mm and 120 mm mortars as well as 50 122 mm rockets and heavy fire from 75 mm recoilless rifles. As the barrage lifted, two battalions from the 3rd Regiment attacked Ross from the west, while one battalion from the 21st Regiment attacked from the south. Fighting from reinforced bunkers that had kept them safe from the bombardment, the 400 soldiers who defended the outer perimeter of LZ Ross met the attackers with blistering fire. The armored personnel carriers raked the PAVN with their cupola-mounted .50-caliber machine guns; artillerymen fired their 105 mm howitzers at the attackers by aiming along the top of their barrels. The assault slowed, lost its cohesion as casualties mounted, and finally came to an end around 05:30. Meanwhile, at Leslie, a reinforced company of sappers from the 2nd Division armed with satchel charges and flamethrowers broke through the perimeter around the same time that the attack against Ross was getting under way. The sappers caused havoc along the bunker line for several minutes, killing over a dozen US soldiers in the swirl of close-range fighting before the infantry company from the 1st Battalion, 7th Cavalry, which was defending the base, drove them off. After making several more unsuccessful efforts to regain their foothold, the sappers withdrew at around 06:00. All told, the PAVN lost 242 killed at Ross and 67 at Leslie. US casualties came to 18 killed (15 of those at Leslie) and 137 wounded. The next morning, the fourth of January, the 196th Infantry Brigade faced a late-developing attack by the 1st Regiment at LZ West. At 04:30, Company D, 4/31st Infantry, was reconnoitering the area to the northwest of the landing zone when it spotted a company of PAVN. Once the shooting began, more PAVN joined the fight. Soon the Americans were facing an entire PAVN battalion. Companies A and C, 4/31st Infantry, converged on the area to prevent the PAVN from reaching the base. The fighting near LZ West continued all that day and into the fifth. On the afternoon of 5 January, Gelling sent Company A, 3/21st Infantry, and Company C, 2/1st Infantry, to reinforce the three companies from the 4/31st Infantry in contact. As darkness fell, the five companies began preparing night defense positions, separated from one another by around 500 metres (550 yd) to 1,000 metres (1,100 yd), in order to screen a wider area with the night ambush teams each would later send out. Company C, 2/1st Infantry, was still preparing its positions when a PAVN battalion struck. PAVN fire took out the company commander and one of his platoon leaders almost immediately. More Americans fell dead and wounded as the volume of fire intensified. Company C fought a desperate four-hour holding action until rescued by Company A, 4/31st Infantry. The battle cost Company C 16 killed and 56 wounded. Gelling pulled the unit out of the field and replaced it with Company B, 2/1st Infantry and Company D, 3/21st Infantry. While PAVN infantrymen clashed with soldiers from the 196th Infantry Brigade around LZ West, the 12.7mm antiaircraft battalion attached to the 2nd Division continued to hunt Campbell's helicopters from entrenched positions around Ross and Leslie. Despite heavy air and artillery strikes on their locations, PAVN gun crews still managed to hit at least 26 helicopters and destroy six. Their most notable success came on 7 January, when PAVN gunners shot down a helicopter carrying the commander of the 2/12th Cavalry, Lieutenant colonel Robert L. Gregory, killing him and six others on board. After a week of hard fighting, however, the 2nd Division was reaching the limit of its endurance. The final clash of the campaign came on 10 January when the 2/12th Cavalry, tangled with a reinforced PAVN battalion near LZ Ross. The firefight resulted in 122 PAVN dead for a cost of 16 American wounded and four armored vehicles destroyed. Afterward, the 2nd Division withdrew from the valley. In the end, the PAVN's plan to create a helicopter killing zone around Leslie and Ross had yielded some success, damaging or destroying several dozen aircraft. On the other hand, the 3rd Brigade had never experienced a critical shortage of working helicopters and the US defenders never ran out of food and ammunition. US officers estimated that during its week-long offensive in the Quế Sơn Valley, the 2nd Division had lost 1,100 soldiers killed in action and a similar number wounded badly enough to require extended medical care.

On 12 February 1968, after participating in Task Force Miracle (the defense of Da Nang during the Tet Offensive), the 1st Battalion, 6th Infantry Regiment returned south and conducted combat operations under the control of the 3rd Brigade, 4th Infantry Division. On 27 February 1968, the 3rd Brigade, 4th Infantry Division tactical area of operations passed to the 196th Infantry Brigade and the 1/6th Infantry came under their operational control. The 3rd Brigade, 4th Infantry Division moved out of the Americal Division area and deployed in the II Corps further to the south.

At the beginning of March, Koster learned that part of the 2nd Division had come down from the western hills into the Que Son Valley, most likely to find food. On 4 March elements from the 196th Infantry Brigade and the 1st Squadron, 1st Cavalry, converged on the south-central part of the valley, which turned out to be teeming with soldiers from the PAVN 3rd Regiment. Over the next eight days, the Americal troops killed an estimated 436 PAVN in dozens of squad- and company-size firefights.

Koster's headquarters continued to look closely for any signs pointing to a new round of attacks against the cities. Some of the information it gathered amounted to little more than unsubstantiated rumor, but in late March an enemy soldier surrendered and told his captors that a large VC force was massing near Hoi An. Acting on the information he provided, elements of the 1st Squadron, 1st Cavalry, and the 198th Infantry Brigade searched the coastal flats south of the city and discovered the 70th Main Force Battalion and several local VC units less than 10km from the provincial capital. Using the mobility and shock of the armored personnel carriers to great advantage, the Americal troops killed an estimated 263 PAVN/VC before they were able to break contact.

In early April, the 198th Infantry Brigade shifted south to the Que Son Valley to fill the gap left by the departure of the 3d Brigade, 4th Infantry Division.

== Aftermath ==
Total PAVN/VC losses attributed to Operations Wheeler and Wallowa claimed by MACV were 10,008 killed and 600 weapons captured (up to January 1968) at a cost of 682 American lives. Until reinforcements arrived from North Vietnam the 2nd Division would be only marginally combat effective. PAVN reinforcements arrived in 1969 and the area was never fully pacified. According to the official US history of the conflict, Operation Wheeler and Wallowa had failed to achieve its objective of encircling and destroying PAVN forces.^{:63} The overall objective of gaining control of the three southernmost provinces of I Corps (South Vietnam) ultimately failed.

Tiger Force, the long-range reconnaissance patrol unit of the 1st Battalion (Airborne), 327th Infantry, 1st Brigade, 101st Airborne Division reportedly killed hundreds of unarmed civilians during the operation who were reported as enemy combatants. In a 1989 teach-in, Noam Chomsky called Operation Wheeler/Wallowa "a huge mass murder operation, in which B-52 raids were targeted right on villages".
