= List of landing zones in the Vietnam War =

Landing Zones during the U.S.-involvement in the Vietnam War include:

- Landing Zone Albany, Central Highlands; involved in the Battle of Ia Drang
- Landing Zone Baldy, Quảng Nam Province
- Landing Zone Brace, Central Highlands
- Landing Zone Brillo Pad, Central Highlands
- Landing Zone Center, Quảng Tín Province; involved in the Battle of Landing Zone Center
- Landing Zone Colt (Landing Zone Ordway) Quảng Nam Province
- Landing Zone Dot, Tây Ninh Province
- Landing Zone East (Landing Zone Mary Lou) Quảng Nam Province
- Landing Zone English (Landing Zone Dog) Bình Định Province
- Landing Zone Hereford, Bình Định Province
- Landing Zone Kate, Quang Duc Province; U.S. Army base
- Landing Zone Leslie, Quảng Nam Province
- Landing Zone Liz, Quang Ngai Province
- Landing Zone Loon, Quảng Trị Province
- Landing Zone Mack, Quảng Trị Province
- Landing Zone Margo, Quảng Trị Province
- Landing Zone Oasis (Landing Zone Tuttle), central South Vietnam
- Landing Zone Peanuts, Quảng Trị Province
- Landing Zone Professional, Quang Tin Province
- Landing Zone Robin, Quảng Trị Province; involved in Operation Robin
- Landing Zone Schueller (Landing Zone Road), central South Vietnam
- Landing Zone Sierra, Quảng Trị Province
- Landing Zone Two Bits, Bình Định Province
- Landing Zone Uplift, coastal South Vietnam
- Landing Zone Virgin, Central Highlands
- Landing Zone X-Ray, Central Highlands
