= Operation Pickens Forest =

Part of the Vietnam War (1970)

- Part of the Vietnam War
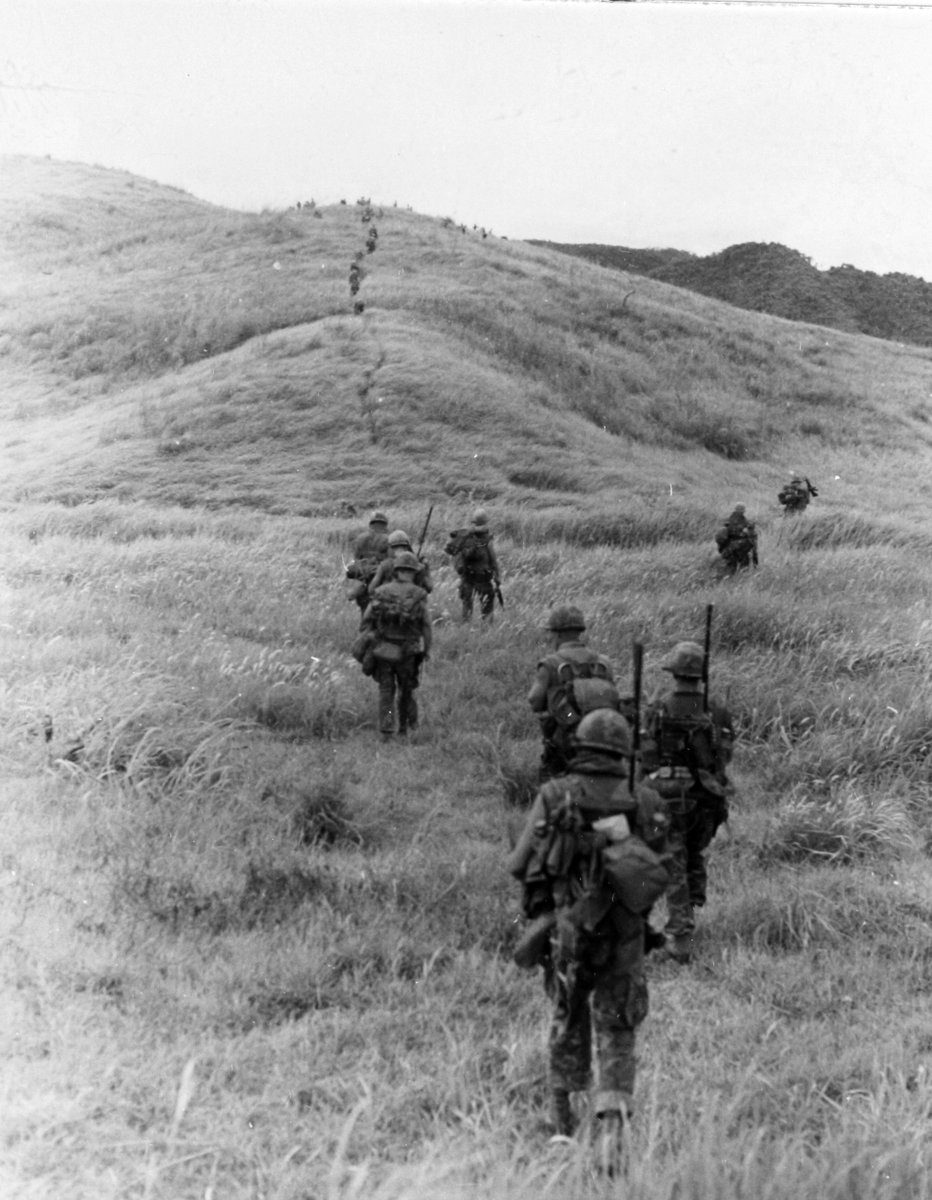
- Company B, 1/7 Marines patrolling during Operation Pickens Forest
Date	16 July – 24 August 1970
Location	Quảng Nam Province

Belligerents
United States	North Vietnam; Viet Cong

Commanders and leaders
Col. Edmund G. Derning	

Units involved
1st Battalion, 5th Marines; 7th Marine Regiment; 3rd Battalion, 11th Marines	38th Regiment

Casualties and losses
4 killed	99 killed

Operation Pickens Forest was a U.S. Marine Corps operation in Quảng Nam Province, South Vietnam that took place from 16 July to 24 August 1970.

== Background ==
In mid-July 1970, the 7th Marine Regiment began planning for an incursion into the People's Army of Vietnam (PAVN) Base Areas 112 and 127 in the mountain ranges of Quảng Nam Province. Since January more than 250 patrols into these two areas had killed more than 300 PAVN. The Pickens Forest tactical area of responsibility (TAOR) would be in the southeast of Base Area 112, 14.5 km southwest of An Hoa Combat Base and centred on the Thu Bồn River. The area was believed to house the Front 4 Headquarters, headquarters and supply units of the Viet Cong (VC) 1st Regiment and the PAVN 38th Regiment and the 490th Sapper Battalion.

== Operation ==
The operation began on the morning of 16 July when helicopters from Marine Aircraft Group 16 landed Company C, 1st Battalion, 5th Marines at Firebase Defiant followed by Battery G 3rd Battalion, 11th Marines and the 7th Marine Regiment command group. Company B 1/5 Marines was landed at Landing Zone Bluejay and Company E, 2nd Battalion, 7th Marines was landed at Landing Zone Starling on each side of the Thu Bồn River, north and south of Firebase Defiant. At 09:30 the 1st Battalion, 7th Marines command group, Companies C and D and 4 mortars from Battery W 3/11 Marines landed at Firebase Mace (15.6758°N 107.96°E), while the 2/7 Marines command group and 4 mortars from Battery W 3/11 Marines landed at Firebase Dart (15.611°N 107.935°E) and Companies F and G landed at Landing Zone Robin.

Over the next 10 days the infantry units at Firebases Dart and Mace swept east towards the blocking forces at the bases along the Thu Bồn River, however the PAVN/VC generally avoided contact, harassing the Marines with grenades and sniper fire. On 22 July the mortar battery and 1/7 Marines command group at Firebase Mace moved to Hill 110, north of Firebase Defiant to cover the infantry advance and on 23 July the mortar battery at Firebase Dart moved to Firebase Defiant. On 26 July the 1/7 Marines command group and Company B returned to Landing Zone Baldy.

On the night of 26 July Company E, 2/7 Marines ambushed a 30-strong PAVN unit, a sweep of the area the next day found five dead PAVN, three weapons and 24 abandoned packs.

On 27 July a VC defector revealed a weapons cache to Company E, 2/7 Marines containing 139 SKS rifles. That day Company C 1/7 Marines returned to LZ Baldy, while Company H, 2/7 Marines joined the operation. Four howitzers and the artillery command group at Firebase Defiant moved to Firebase Ross and the remaining two howitzers moved to Hill 110 forming a provisional artillery batter with the mortars there.

On 28 July 1/5 Marines left the operation and returned to Hill 327 and the 7th Marine Regiment command group returned to LZ Baldy, leaving the 2/7 Marines responsible for the Pickens Forest TAOR.

On 30 July as eight Company E, 2/7 Marines searched a gorge of the Thu Bồn River in two small boats they were fired on by four PAVN/VC machine guns in caves along the river sinking both boats and killing two Marines. The rest of the company provided covering fire while Marine jets dropped Napalm which suppressed the machine guns. Company C, 1/5 Marines was landed by helicopter south of the ambush site that afternoon to block any exit route and the next day moved forward to the ambush site killing one VC.

On 9 August 2/7 Marines was ordered to expand its operations further west and that day Company E and two 105 mm howitzers from Firebase Ross were landed at the former Vietnamese Marines Firebase Hatchet (15.7365°N 107.815°E), 32 km northwest of Hill 110, their arrival was met by five 122 mm rockets which killed one South Vietnamese soldier. On 10 August two 105 mm and two 155 mm howitzers were flown in from Firebase Ross followed by the 2/7 Marines command group and then on 12 August Companies E and F arrived at the base and began searching the surrounding area.

On 16 August Company G and the provisional artillery battery at Hill 110 moved back to LZ Baldy.

On the morning of 20 August the 3rd Platoon of Company H was sweeping an area near the hamlet of My Hiep (2), 3 km north of Hatchet when it was ambushed by a PAVN unit, Company F marched to the scene while Company G was flown in from LZ Baldy but the PAVN withdrew by 13:00 leaving three dead, while the Marines had lost one killed. A sweep of the area the next morning found another one PAVN dead and 12 bunkers. On 22 August a further six bunkers were found nearby and intelligence determined that this was the headquarters of part of the PAVN 38th Regiment which was preparing to attack Hatchet. On 23 August four PAVN were seen scouting the Hatchet perimeter and were fired on using a 106 mm recoilless rifle. On 24 August the Marines at Firebase Hatchet were withdrawn and returned to their parent units, with the 2/7 Marines immediately being deployed into the Quế Sơn mountains as part of Operation Ripley Center.

== Aftermath ==
Operation Pickens Forest concluded on 24 August, the Marines had lost four killed and the PAVN/VC 99 killed.
