= Landing Zone Colt =

American army base in Vietnam

Site information
- Type: Army

Location
- Coordinates: 15.723°N 108.338°E

Site history
- Built: 1967
- In use: 1967
- Battles/wars: Vietnam War

Garrison information
- Occupants: 5th Battalion, 7th Cavalry Regiment

Landing Zone Colt (also known as Landing Zone Ordway) was a U.S. Army base located southwest of Hoi An, Quảng Nam Province in central Vietnam.

== History ==
The base was located east of the Quế Sơn Valley and approximately 8k km west of Highway 1 and approximately 9 km southwest of Landing Zone Baldy.

Colt was originally established by the U.S. Army 5th Battalion, 7th Cavalry Regiment during Operation Wallowa in early October 1967.

At 04:00 on 10 October, People's Army of Vietnam (PAVN) forces from the 3rd PAVN Regiment, including some disguised in US Army uniforms, attacked Colt. The attackers penetrated the base perimeter and targeted the Battalion command post killing everyone inside with grenades and small arms fire before withdrawing. Seven U.S. soldiers were killed during the attack and 17 wounded. The following day helicopter gunships attacked a PAVN unit and a patrol found several PAVN bodies, including one with a detailed map of the base layout. It was speculated that a PAVN informer had mapped out the base while attending a civilian aid station located inside the base.

== Current use ==
The area has reverted to farmland and housing.
