= Giáp Văn Cương =

Vietnam People's Navy admiral

Admiral Giáp Văn Cương

Deputy Chief of the PAVN General Staff
- In office 1974–1977

Personal details
- Born: 13 September 1921 Lục Nam, Bắc Giang, Tonkin (French protectorate)
- Died: 27 March 1990 (aged 68) Hà Nội, Việt Nam
- Party: Communist Party of Vietnam
- Awards: Hero of the People's Armed Forces (posthumously)

Military service
- Branch/service: People's Army of Vietnam; Vietnam People's Navy
- Years of service: 1945–1990
- Rank: Admiral
- Battles/wars: Operation Masher; Operation Wheeler/Wallowa; First Battle of Quảng Trị; Operation CQ-88

Giáp Văn Cương (1921–1990) was an Admiral of the Vietnam People's Navy. He participated in both the first Indochina War and the second Indochina War.

== Early years ==
Giáp Văn Cương was born on 13 September 1921 in Bảo Đài commune, Lục Nam district, Bắc Giang province of the Tonkin Protectorate, French Indochina.

== Military career ==
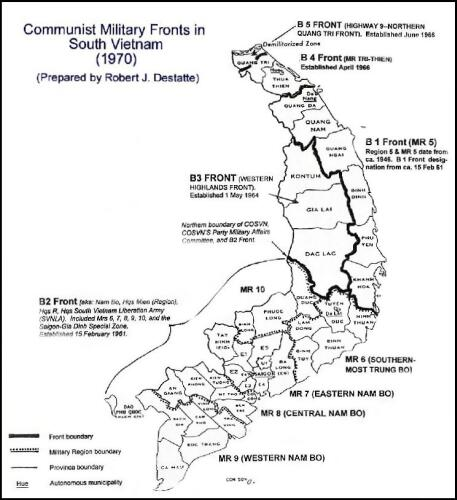
NLF Fronts and Military regions, 1970

In Operation Masher, Cương led the PAVN 3rd Infantry Division fighting against a combined force of the U.S. Army 1st Cavalry Division and the ARVN 22nd Infantry Division. Although suffering losses of a third of personnel and dozen tons of reserved rice and salt, he preserved the division's fighting strength while making the allied force paid a high price on personnel and helicopter losses.

In the fourth month of Operation Wheeler/Wallowa, Col. Lê Hữu Trữ, commander of the PAVN 2nd Division was killed alongside his staff, Col. Cương was transferred from the position of chief of staff of B1 Front to replace Trữ.

In the First Battle of Quảng Trị 1972, Col. Cương was in charge of the Southern flank with the 324B Division and B5 Front elements.

In 1974, he was promoted to Major General, Deputy Chief of the General Staff of the Vietnam People's Army. In 1977, he was appointed Commander of the Vietnam People's Navy. In 1988, he was promoted to Admiral, the first Admiral of the Vietnam People's Navy.
