= Firebase Ross =

US–South Vietnam military base in Quế Sơn

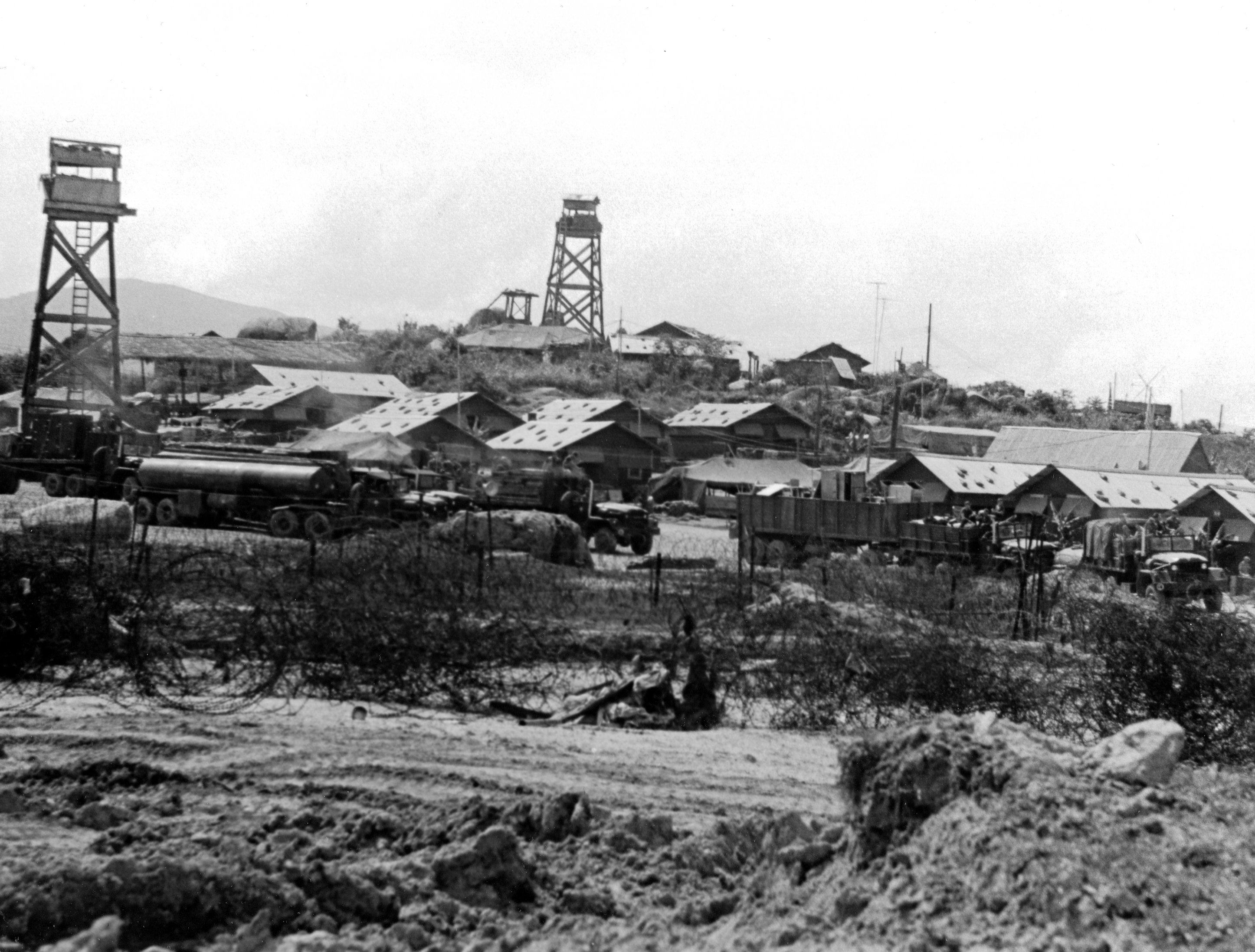
- Firebase Ross as the 3rd Battalion, 5th Marines prepares to leave, 14 February 1971

Site information
- Type: Marines/Army

Location
- Coordinates: 15.671°N 108.222°E

Site history
- Built: 1968
- In use: 1968-72
- Battles/wars: Vietnam War

Garrison information
- Occupants: 3rd Brigade, 1st Cavalry Division; 1st Marine Division

Firebase Ross (also known as Hill 51) was a U.S. Marine Corps, Army and Army of the Republic of Vietnam (ARVN) fire support base located in the Quế Sơn Valley southwest of Hội An, Quảng Nam Province in central Vietnam.

== History ==
The base was located in the Quế Sơn Valley along Route 535, approximately 27 km southwest of Hội An.

In January 1968 the 3rd Brigade, 1st Cavalry Division had its headquarters at Ross. On the afternoon of 2 January, elements of the 12th Cavalry Regiment engaged a unit from the People's Army of Vietnam (PAVN) 2nd Division in a four-hour-long battle 5 km south of Ross resulting in 3 U.S. and 39 PAVN killed. On the early morning of 3 January the PAVN attacked four U.S. firebases in the Quế Sơn Valley, launching ground attacks against Ross and Landing Zone Leslie, which were defeated by dawn for the loss of 18 U.S. and 331 PAVN killed.

In late June 1969 the 3rd Battalion 7th Marines moved by road to Ross. On 22 August two Marine companies were sent by road to assist the Army's 4th Battalion, 35th Infantry which was heavily engaged with elements of the PAVN 2nd Division in the Hiệp Đức District and became involved in a running battle lasting until 29 August. On 9 December the 1st Battalion 7th Marines replaced the 3/7 Marines at Ross.

In the early morning of 6 January 1970 under the cover of monsoon rains the Vietcong 409th Battalion attacked Ross with mortars and sappers penetrating the wire. The attack was repulsed by 04:00 resulting in 13 Marines and 38 Vietcong killed. In March the 2nd Battalion 7th Marines replaced the 1/7 Marines at Ross. From April through June the PAVN and Vietcong carried out regular mortar and rocket attacks on Ross and Quế Sơn town. In September the 7th Marines began to withdraw from the Quế Sơn Valley as part of Operation Keystone Robin Alpha handing over control to the 5th Marine Regiment.

In January 1971 as part of the general drawdown of U.S. forces the 23rd Infantry Division took over the Marines tactical area of responsibility but made it clear they would not take over the Marine bases at Ross, Landing Zone Baldy or Firebase Ryder. On 15 February 1971 the Marines turned over Ross to the ARVN 411th Regional Force Company.

On 18 August 1972 following an artillery barrage by 130mm guns the PAVN 711th Division attacked and captured Quế Sơn town and Ross, including 15-20 of the then secret TOW missiles among the abandoned equipment. The ARVN 5th Regiment, 2nd Division troops defending Ross were said to have failed to carry out their mission, while the Regional Forces defending Quế Sơn were said to have performed "surprisingly well". The ARVN forces retreated to Firebase Baldy and mounted a defence from there. South Vietnamese sources said that since the start of the Easter Offensive there had been practically no South Vietnamese presence between Quế Sơn and the Laotian border, allowing the PAVN to bring in the 130mm guns without detection. On 23 August ARVN forces attempting to recapture Quế Sơn claimed to have killed 108 PAVN for the loss of one killed in fighting 3 miles (4.8 km) from the town. On 24 August the 5th Regiment commander, Colonel Nguyen Van Lu and a battalion commander, were arrested for their role in losing Ross and it was reported that as many as 2,500 ARVN troops remained unaccounted for.

The ARVN 4th Regiment recaptured Ross on 9 September 1972.

Other units stationed at Ross included:

- 3rd Battalion, 11th Marines
- 12th Marines
- 4th Battalion, 13th Marines
- 2nd battalion, 94th Artillery

== Current use ==
The base is now the site of a park and PAVN victory monument.
