= Landing Zone Leslie =

U.S. military base during Vietnam War

Site information
- Type: Army

Location
- Coordinates: 15.639°N 108.177°E

Site history
- Built: 1967
- In use: 1967-8
- Battles/wars: Vietnam War

Garrison information
- Occupants: 3rd Brigade, 1st Cavalry Division

Landing Zone Leslie (also known as Firebase Leslie or Hill 138) was a U.S. Army and Army of the Republic of Vietnam (ARVN) base located in the Quế Sơn Valley southwest of Hội An, Quảng Nam Province in central Vietnam.

== History ==
The base was located in the Quế Sơn Valley along Route 534, approximately 33 km northwest of Tam Ky.

The base was occupied by D Company and a platoon from A Company, 2nd Battalion, 12th Cavalry when on the early morning of 3 January 1968 the People's Army of Vietnam (PAVN) 3rd Regiment, 2nd Division attacked four U.S. firebases in the Quế Sơn Valley, launching ground attacks against Leslie and Firebase Ross. At Leslie the PAVN penetrated the base, attacking bunkers with flamethrowers and satchel charges before being pushed out in the afternoon. Losses were 15 U.S and 63 PAVN. The PAVN emplaced heavy machine guns around Leslie and over a nine-day period shot down 7 1st Cavalry helicopters and damaged a further 26.
