= Landing Zone Dot =

Site information
- Type: Army

Location
- Coordinates: 11.622°N 106.432°E

Site history
- Built: 1968
- In use: 1968-9
- Battles/wars: Vietnam War

Landing Zone Dot was a U.S. Army and Army of the Republic of Vietnam (ARVN) base located south of the Fishhook in Tây Ninh Province southern Vietnam.

== History ==
The base was located approximately 7 km south of the Fishhook in Tây Ninh Province approximately 25 km east of Katum Camp.

On 13 November 1968 the base was defended by the ARVN 36th Regiment supported by Delta Battery, 1st Battalion, 5th Artillery when it was attacked by a 1000-man People's Army of Vietnam (PAVN) force. The attack was beaten back with support from aerial rocket artillery and artillery at nearby firebases. Delta Battery fired more than 900 rounds of high explosive, white phosphorus and beehive rounds at point blank range. The accurate and effective fire put forth by Delta Battery contributed greatly to the defense of the camp, and the defeat of the insurgents. PAVN losses were 287 killed, while ARVN losses were 4 killed and 23 wounded.

== Current use ==
The base has reverted to farmland.
