= Landing Zone Peanuts =

Former American base

Site information
- Type: Army
- Condition: abandoned

Location
- Coordinates: 16.6318°N 106.6925°E

Site history
- Built: 1968
- In use: 1968
- Battles/wars: Vietnam War

Garrison information
- Occupants: 1st Cavalry Division

Landing Zone Peanuts is a former U.S. Army base in northwest Quảng Trị Province, Vietnam.

== History ==
The base was located approximately 5 km southwest of Khe Sanh Combat Base and 4 km north of Lang Vei. It was originally established by the 1st Cavalry Division during Operation Pegasus, the relief of Khe Sanh.

Companies A and B, 1st Battalion, 5th Cavalry Regiment and Company A, 1st Battalion, 77th Artillery Regiment were located at the base in early May 1968. On 4 May the base came under 120 mm mortar and 122 mm rocket fire. At approximately 16:30 three 122 mm rockets impacted among approximately 2000 rounds of 105 mm ammunition that had been delivered just prior to the attack. The resultant fire and explosions, coupled with a direct hit on a 105 mm gun section rendered one gun inoperational while the other two guns continued to function despite ammunition cooking off. In the early morning of 5 May 1968 the base again received incoming 120 mm mortar rounds and B-40 rockets followed by a sapper attack. The attack was repelled with 32 People's Army of Vietnam (PAVN) soldiers killed inside the defensive wire. Due to its losses in both equipment and personnel, later on 5 May Company A 1/77th was extracted and repositioned at LZ Jane. Eleven US soldiers were killed in the 5 May attack.
