= Battle of Lo Giang =

Part of the Vietnam War (1968)

Battle of Lỗ Giáng
- Part of the Vietnam War (Tet Offensive)
Date	8 – 9 February 1968
Location	Near Đà Nẵng, South Vietnam 16.0°N 108.202°E
Result	US victory

Belligerents
United States	North Vietnam; Viet Cong

Commanders and leaders
MG Donn J. Robertson	COL Giáp Văn Cương LTC Nguyễn Chơn

Units involved
3rd Marine Division: 2nd Battalion, 3rd Marines; 1st Marine Division: 3rd Battalion, 5th Marines; 23rd Infantry Division (Americal): 2nd Battalion, 1st Infantry; 1st Battalion, 6th Infantry	2nd Infantry Division: 1st Regiment; 40th Battalion; 60th Battalion; 90th Battalion; 31st Regiment; 3rd Battalion

Casualties and losses
32 killed	US body count: 286 killed

The Battle of Lỗ Giáng took place during the Vietnam War from 8-9 February 1968, when the People's Army of Vietnam (PAVN)'s 2nd Division attacked the Đà Nẵng Air Base as part of the Tet Offensive (Tết Mậu Thân). The attack was repelled by U.S. Marine Corps and U.S. Army units.

== Background ==
On 7 February 1968, the 1st Marine Division commander Major general Donn J. Robertson informed III Marine Amphibious Force commander Lieutenant general Robert E. Cushman Jr. that the PAVN 2nd Division had evaded Army of the Republic of Vietnam (ARVN) and Republic of Korea Marine Corps positions south of Da Nang and threatened 2nd Battalion, 3rd Marines and 3rd Battalion, 5th Marines positions immediately south of Da Nang Air Base.

After sharing these concerns at a meeting that day with COMUSMACV General William Westmoreland, Westmoreland ordered 23rd Infantry Division commander MG Samuel W. Koster to make some of his battalions available to the Marines to bolster their defense. It was decided to deploy 2 battalions from the 23rd Division to support the 3/5 Marines near Cầu Đỏ on Highway 1. One battalion was to deploy immediately, with the other to deploy the next day. Both battalions would be under the operational control of the 1st Marine Division. On the afternoon of 7 February Marine helicopters deployed the 1st Battalion, 6th Infantry Regiment into the hamlet of Dương Sơn (1) (15.981°N 108.190°E) 2km south of Cầu Đỏ.

== Battle ==
At 03:45 on 8 February, the PAVN began mortaring the Combined Action Program (CAP) E-4 compound in the hamlet of Lỗ Giáng (1)(16.0°N 108.202°E), 4km northeast of Dương Sơn (1) and by daybreak had surrounded the hamlet. At 07:00, Robertson moved the 1/6th Infantry to Lỗ Giáng (5) (16.008°N 108.217°E), 1km northeast of Lỗ Giáng (1) where they were quickly engaged by another enemy force. Robertson then deployed the 2/3 Marines and 3/5 Marines to support the 1/6th Infantry and they were engaged in battle until late afternoon. Meanwhile, a 15-man Marine detachment attempted to move south from Hòa Vang (16.013°N 108.205°E) to relieve Lỗ Giáng (1), but all but one were killed. At 15:50, the CAP platoon in Lỗ Giáng (1) was evacuated by Marine helicopters with gunship and air support. PAVN losses were over 150 killed.

On the evening of 8 February, the 2nd Battalion, 1st Infantry Regiment was deployed and the Army task force named Task Force Miracle under the command of Colonel Louis Gelling established its command near Dương Sơn. Gelling deployed the 2/1st Infantry in blocking positions south of Lỗ Giáng (1).

On the morning of 9 February the 2/1st Infantry attacked north, engaging a PAVN force in a nine hour battle, later finding 46 PAVN bodies and taking one prisoner who revealed that he was from the 3rd Battalion, 31st Regiment, while the forces in Lỗ Giáng (5) were from the Vietcong (VC) 1st Regiment. West of Lỗ Giáng the 2/3 Marines engaged two companies from the 1st Regiment killing 90.

== Aftermath ==
Marine intelligence reported on 9 February that the PAVN 2nd Division was moving its headquarters back to its usual positions in the Gò Nổi Island area (15.851°N 108.186°E). Task Force Miracle continued to patrol the Lỗ Giáng area for two days, but on 11 February Cushman released control of Task Force Miracle back to the 23rd Infantry Division.

Marine losses were 14 killed, Army losses were 18 killed, while PAVN/VC losses were in excess of 286. PAVN claim that their 1st Regiment eliminated nearly one U.S. Battalion.
