= Lục Nam district =

Coordinates: 21.333°N 106.417°E

Lục Nam district Huyện Lục Nam
- District
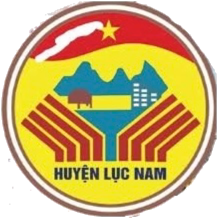
- Seal
- Interactive map of Lục Nam district
- Country: Vietnam
- Province: Bắc Giang
- Capital: Đồi Ngô

Government
  - Party Secretary: Thân Văn Dàn
  - People's Council Chairman: Hà Quốc Hợp
  - People's Committee Chairman: Thân Văn Dàn

Area
  - District: 231 sq mi (597 km^{2})

Population (2019 census)
  - District: 226,194
  - Density: 981/sq mi (379/km^{2})
  - Urban: 12,975
  - Rural: 213,219
- Time zone: UTC+7 (Indochina Time)

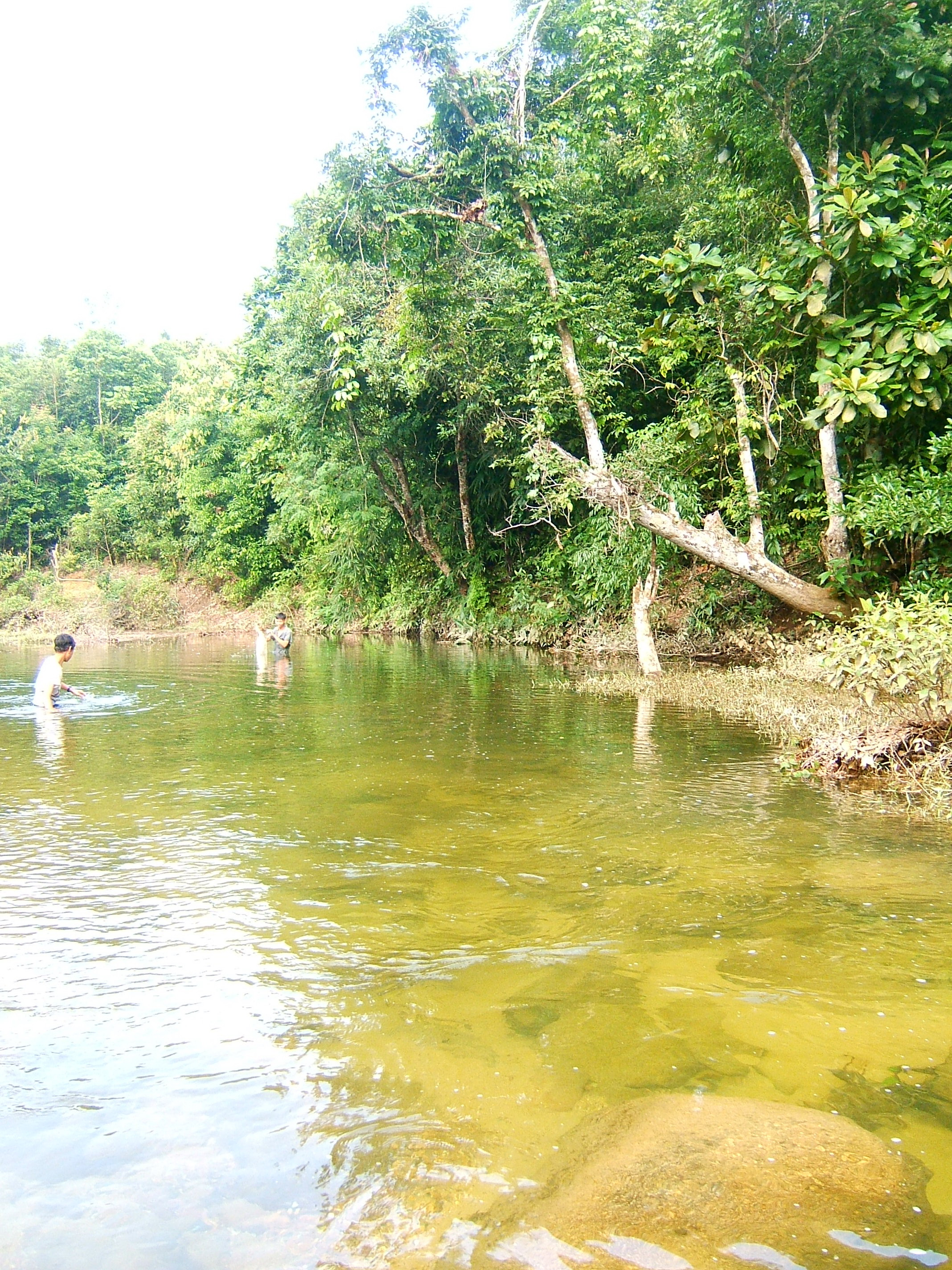
Golden stream with golden yellow color on the Mt. Phật Sơn, part of Yen Tu mountain range in Luc Son commune, Luc Nam district, Bac Giang province.

Lục Nam is a former rural district of Bắc Giang province in the Northeast region of Vietnam. As of 2019 the district had a population of 226,194. The district covers an area of 597 km^{2}. The district capital lies at Đồi Ngô. The Mỡ stream can be found here.

== Divisions ==
The district subdivided to 25 commune-level subdivisions, including the township of Đồi Ngô (district capital) and the rural communes of:

1. Lục Sơn
2. Bình Sơn
3. Trường Sơn
4. Vô Tranh
5. Trường Giang
6. Nghĩa Phương
7. Cương Sơn
8. Huyền Sơn
9. Bắc Lũng
10. Cẩm Lý
11. Vũ Xá
12. Đan Hội
13. Yên Sơn
14. Lan Mẫu
15. Phương Sơn
16. Thanh Lâm
17. Chu Điện
18. Bảo Đài
19. Bảo Sơn
20. Tam Dị
21. Đông Phú
22. Đông Hưng
23. Tiên Nha
24. Khám Lạng
