= 12th Cavalry Regiment (United States) =

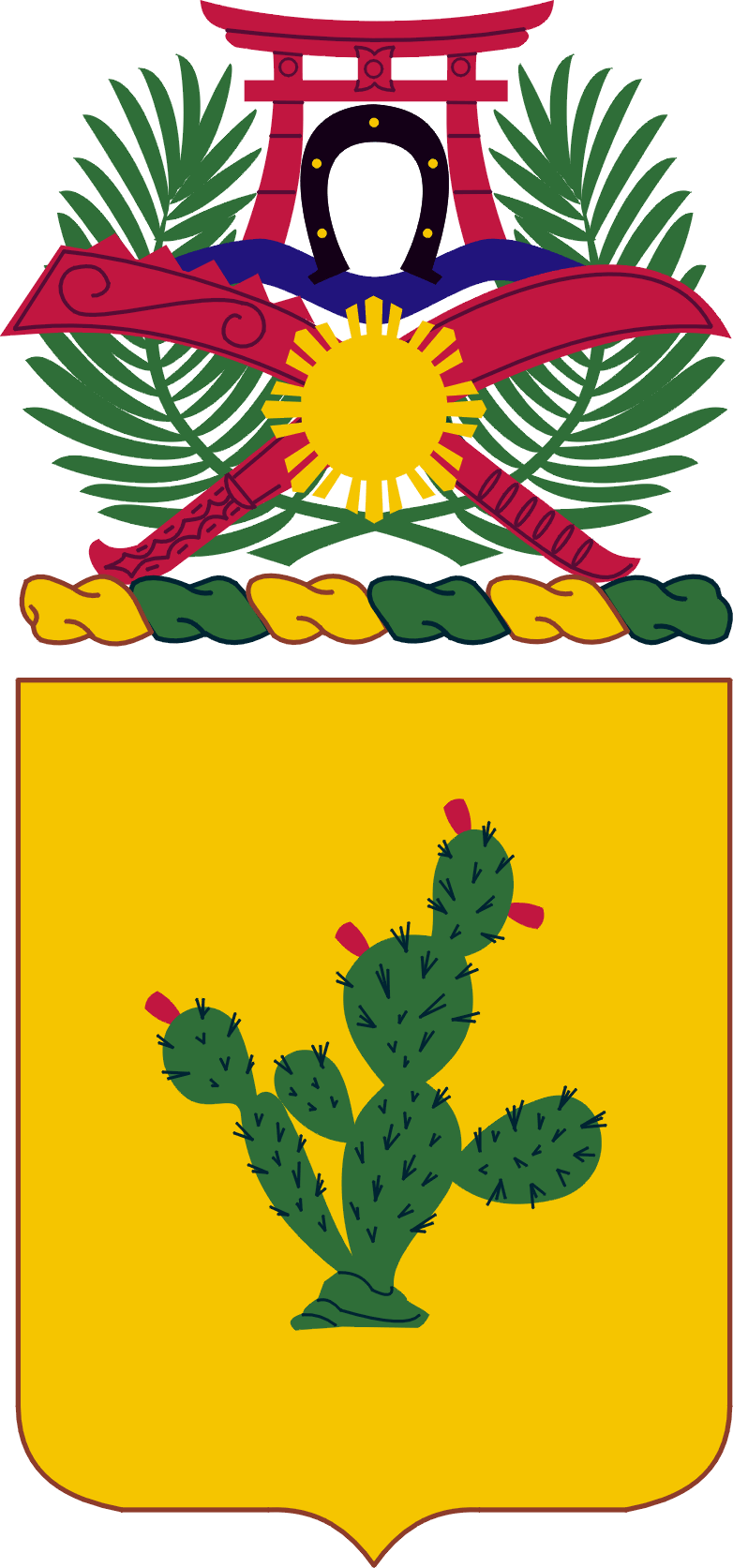
- 12th Cavalry coat of arms
- Active: 1901–1949; 1953-present
- Country: United States of America
- Branch: United States Army
- Type: Cavalry (Armor Branch)
- Garrison/HQ: Fort Hood
- Motto: "Semper Paratus" (Latin: "always ready")
- Colors: Yellow
- Engagements: World War II Vietnam War: Battle of Huế; Iraq War

Commanders
- Notable commanders: Jesse McI. Carter; Gordon B. Rogers

Insignia
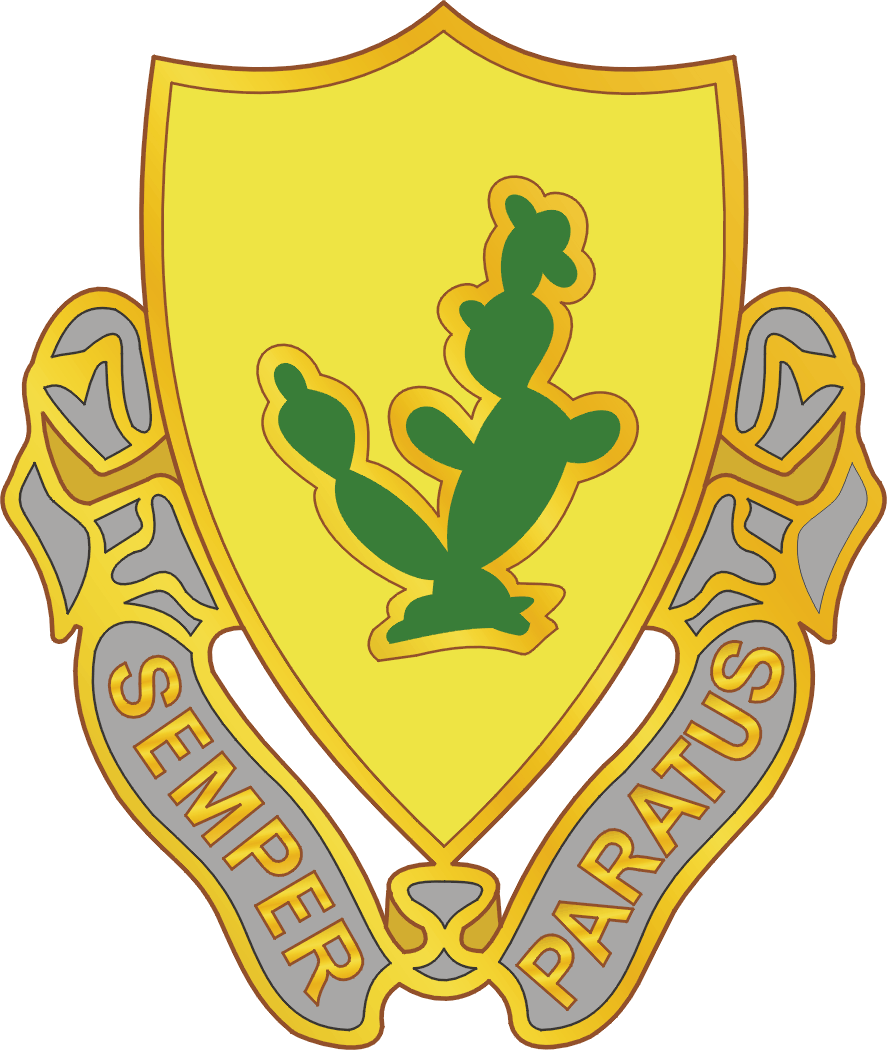
- Regimental distinctive insignia

The 12th Cavalry is a United States Army Regimental System parent cavalry regiment of the Armor Branch of the United States Army. It is currently stationed at Fort Hood.

Formed in 1901, during World War II the 12th Cavalry served as an infantry regiment within 1st Cavalry Division in the Pacific. It was deactivated in 1949 but recreated under the U.S. Army Combat Arms Regimental System with two battalions.

== History ==
On 2 February 1901, Congress authorized the organization of the Twelfth Regiment of Cavalry, Army of the United States. Under this authority, the regiment was formed at Fort Sam Houston, Texas on 8 February 1901. From 1901 until 1911, the regiment served posts in Texas, Georgia, and the Philippines.

During World War II the 12th Cavalry served as an infantry regiment within the 1st Cavalry Division.

The regiment was deactivated prior to the 1st Cavalry Division's service in the Korean War, but its lineage was resurrected in with the creation in 1957 of the Combat Arms Regimental System, in which the battalions listed below were created.

During the Cold War 3rd Squadron 12th Cavalry was assigned to the 3rd Armored Division in Germany as the divisional cavalry squadron. The 4th Squadron 12th Cavalry was assigned to the 5th Infantry Division (Mechanized) at Fort Carson, CO, in the 1960s and at Fort Polk, LA. A Troop of the 4th Squadron served in Vietnam with the 1st Brigade, 5th Infantry Division in Vietnam from 1968 to 1971.

After Operation Iraqi Freedom II, the 12th Cavalry Regiment underwent a major transition as elements from 2/7CAV, 1/9CAV, and 3/8CAV were reflagged and combined with the regiment to create the battalions currently in service. The 2nd Battalion, Twelfth Cavalry Regiment, as well as 2/7CAV and 1/9CAV moved to the 4th Brigade of the 1st Cavalry Division. 4th "Long Knife" Brigade Combat Team, 1st Cavalry Division cased its colors in an inactivation ceremony Thursday, 17 Oct. 2013, at Fort Hood's Cooper Field. The 1st Battalion, Twelfth Cavalry Regiment, 2/7CAV, and 3/8CAV now operate at Fort Hood, Texas, and are now with the 3rd Brigade Combat Team, 1st Cavalry Division.

=== 1st Battalion, 12th Cavalry ===
The regiment returned to Texas to conduct border patrol duty in the Lower Rio Grande Valley. There the 1st Squadron engaged small detachments of raiding bandits until 22 February 1916.

The 1st Squadron then reported for duty to Corozal in the Panama Canal Zone. The squadron remained in Corozal until 1921 when the regiment was reorganized during the drawdown following the First World War.

On 3 January 1933 the Twelfth Cavalry was assigned to the 1st Cavalry Division and participated in division maneuvers. The unit was reorganized as an infantry regiment in preparation for overseas service.

The Twelfth Cavalry arrived in Australia on 26 July 1943 and began six months of jungle and amphibious training. The Regiment's first assault in the Pacific War came on 29 February 1944 when her soldiers assaulted the Los Negros Islands in the Admiralty Islands, north of New Guinea. The Twelfth Cavalry was assigned to the Leyte-Samar Campaign and helped liberate those islands from Japanese control in spite of stubborn resistance. Continuing the attack onto the island of Luzon, Regimental history was highlighted on 3 February 1945 when a flying column of Cavalrymen cut a 100-mile path through enemy-held territory to be the "First in Manila".

After World War II, the Twelfth Cavalry settled in for occupation duty in Japan and was inactivated on 29 March 1949. The Twelfth Cavalry was reactivated on 15 February 1957 as part of the 1st Armored Division at Fort Polk, Louisiana. The 1st Squadron was designated "1st Reconnaissance Squadron."

The Twelfth was again inactivated on 3 February 1962. On 1 September 1963 the squadron was redesignated the First Battalion and reactivated and assigned to the First Cavalry Division in Korea. In June 1965, the battalion's colors were returned to Fort Benning, Georgia. The 1st BN 187 Inf (ABN), a battalion of the 11th Air Assault Division (Test), was reflagged as the 1st BN 12th Cav (ABN) 1st Cavalry Division in preparation for duty in the Republic of Vietnam. This unit was taken off jump status after one year in Vietnam.

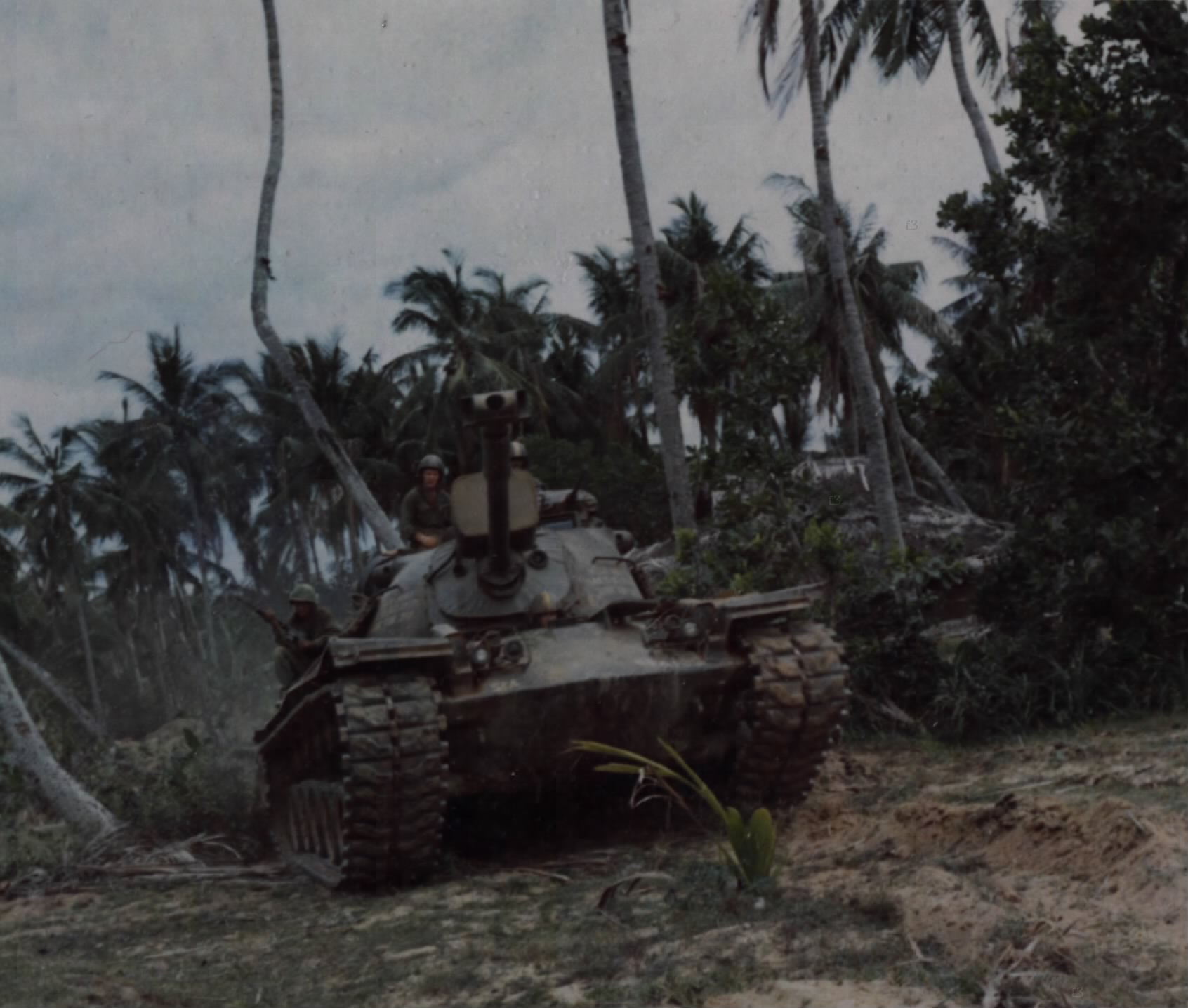
An M48 tank of the 1st Battalion moves through a village, during a search for Viet Cong, Operation Pershing, 9 June 1967

During the Vietnam War units of the battalion participated in 12 campaigns and earned three Presidential Unit Citations and three Valorous Unit Awards for actions against the Viet Cong and the People's Army of Vietnam. In June 1972 the battalion returned from Vietnam to its new home at Fort Hood, Texas where it was organized as an M113A1 equipped mechanized infantry battalion, a maneuver battalion of the 1st Brigade of the Army's 1st Cavalry Division (TRICAP). Significant during the battalion's TRICAP period in 1972, it participated in a massive removal of unexploded ordnance in the impact area of Ft. Hood, much of it dating to WW II, in preparation for the conduct of a several week multi division force on force exercise pitting the TRICAP Division against 2nd Armored Division in Operation Gallant Hand. The 1st Battalion's work during this exercise was a further extension of work done by the 2nd Battalion, 12th Cavalry with other units of the 1st Brigade during Air Cavalry Combat Brigade Tests 1 and 2 to evaluate the TRICAP organization of armor, air assault, assault helicopter and mechanized infantry as a combined arms force operating against Soviet style ground forces. LTC Kelley commanded the battalion at this time.

On 15 June 1983, the 1st Battalion was relieved of its assignment to the First Cavalry Division and was inactivated at Fort Hood, Texas. Three years later, on 4 October 1986, the battalion was reactivated as the 1st Squadron at Fort Knox, Kentucky. There, the squadron assumed the mission of training new armor soldiers. On 16 December 1992 the Squadron was redesignated the First Battalion and moved to Fort Hood, Texas.

The 1st Battalion, 12th Cavalry was deployed to Camp McGovern, Bosnia from March to September 1999 in support of Operation Joint Forge Stabilization Force (SFOR) 5B. 1-12 CAV patrolled the areas around Brčko in northern Bosnia, and enforced the Dayton Peace Accords. This rotational tour included patrolling the Zone of Separation established as a buffer between the warring factions, Weapon Storage Site (WSS) inspections and inventories, and joint patrols with other NATO units. During this rotational deployment, 1-12 CAV witnessed the final UN arbitration decision regarding control of the key city of Brčko, and the NATO airstrikes in Serbia in support of initial NATO operations in Kosovo.

As of May 2002, the 1st Battalion, 12th Cavalry transitioned to the M1A2 SEP tank – the first unit in the 1st Cavalry Division to do so.

In March 2004, 1st Battalion deployed as part of 1st Brigade, 1st Cavalry Division to East Baghdad, Iraq in support of Operation Iraqi Freedom II. Organized as a task force with attached infantry and engineer companies and operating from Camp Eagle outside Sadr City, 1–12 CAV battled the Mahdi Army of Muqtada al-Sadr throughout 2004. Task Force 1–12 Cavalry was commanded by LTC Tim Meredith, with senior NCO CSM Donald Battle.

October 2006 – December 2007 1st Battalion deployed as part of 3rd Brigade Combat Team, 1st Cavalry Division to Baqubah, Iraq. Under the command of LTC Goins and CSM Harris. While in Baqubah the battalion was spread then across the Diayla Province, then known as a safe haven for ISI (Islamic State of Iraq) and AQI (Al Queda in Iraq). Baqubah was announced to be the capital of the ISI and the coalition forces were to be routed out. After 7 months, Operation Arrowhead Ripper was initiated. The operation was success, with the city and infrastructure becoming more secure. The 1–12 CAV was in Baqubah for 15 months.

The battalion deployed again in December 2008 to the volatile Ninewa Province, Iraq, this time, under the command of LTC Michael Fadden and CSM Eddie Delvalle.

From February–December 2011, 1st Battalion was deployed to southern Iraq with 3rd Brigade, 1st Cavalry Division in support of Operation New Dawn under LTC Andrew Poznick and CSM Darryl Gill. Although the main effort was situated in Basrah, the Soldiers of Delta Company were tasked to man a remote Combat Outpost named COP Minden near the Iraq-Iran border which was a key target for insurgent fighters in the region. They were among the last American soldiers to exit Iraq.

February 2014 1st Battalion deployed about 800 "combat-ready" soldiers to Camps Hovey and Stanley, Republic of Korea, for nine months. This included the entire battalion and its forward support company. The deployment was part of the Army Force Generation rotational plan to increase theater readiness and maneuver capabilities. The battalion was attached to the 1st Armored Brigade Combat Team, 2nd Infantry Division. (The "Second to None" division is the only permanent forward-deployed division in the U.S. Army.).

=== 2nd Battalion, 12th Cavalry ===
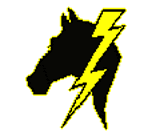
Insignia 2nd Battalion, 12th Cavalry

As of 1933, the squadron was headquartered at Fort Ringgold, near Rio Grande City, the Second of the 12th rode patrols along the southern border for almost forty years under different headquarters.

==== WWII ====
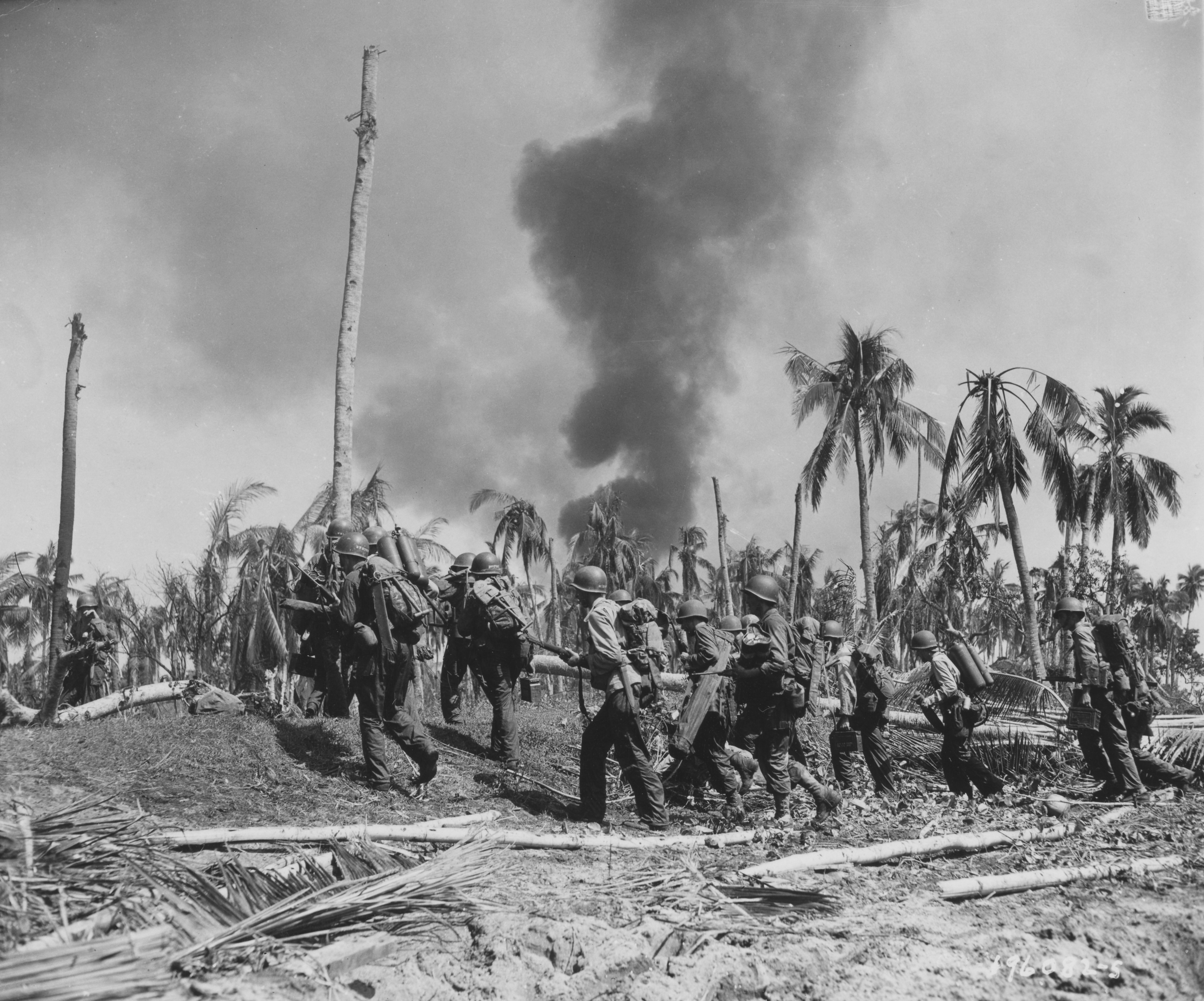
Troops of the 12th Cavalry move from the beach at Luzon

Late in 1940, the battalion returned to Fort Bliss and trained for war as part of the 1st Cavalry Division's Second Brigade and participated in the Louisiana Maneuvers.

The battalion traded its horses for jeep and amphibious assault vehicles in February 1943. In mid-June 1943, the Division shipped out for Australia, where it trained in preparation for combat on the Pacific Rim. The battalion saw its first combat on Los Negros Island in March 1944.

The battalion also participated in the invasion of the Philippines. Landing on Leyte on 20 October 1944, the regiment was assigned the most difficult terrain in the central mountain ranges and faced fierce fighting. The fight was characterized by the bloody fight for Hill 2348 on 15 November. After being cut off from their supply lines, the battalion held off waves of suicide attacks. Finally on the night of 2 December, the troopers counterattacked and took the hill. The First Team lost 241 killed in action during the fighting on Leyte.

On 27 January, the battalion stormed ashore on Luzon. It took six months, but on 30 June 1945, the entire island was secured. Selected by MacArthur to be the first into Japan, the battalion took on occupation duty near Yokohama until its deactivation in 1949.

==== Vietnam ====
Reactivated in 1957, the battalion deployed to Vietnam in 1965 and fought the division's first engagement from 18 to 20 September as part of Operation Gibraltar. On 2 February 1968 during the Battle of Huế the battalion was deployed from Camp Evans to PK-17 to launch an attack towards La Chu to close off the PAVN supply routes west of Huế. The 2/12th Cavalry was pinned down by superior PAVN forces and eventually broke out on the night of 3 February leaving their dead behind. The battalion participated in the Cambodian Incursion and earned its 16th campaign streamer for the Sanctuary Counteroffensive. Serving as battalion signal officer during the Battle of Khe Sanh was future U.S. Senator Max Cleland.

On 26 March 1971, the battalion stood down after five and a half years in Vietnam and returned to the United States at Fort Hood, Texas for permanent duty for the first time since 1943. In May 1971 the 2nd Battalion became a maneuver battalion in 1st Brigade, 1st Cavalry Division (TRICAP). Organized as an M113A1 equipped mechanized infantry battalion, from May 1971 through most of the remaining year, elements of the battalion were deployed in support of Air Cavalry Combat Brigade Tests 1 and 2. These important tests evaluated the integration of attack helicopter capability with armored, mechanized and air assault, evaluating the ability of these elements in combination to defeat a Soviet ground force opponent. LTC Milford Marshall commanded during much of this period. Later, the battalion participated in several deployments on REFORGER as well as having been tasked as one of the test beds for the 1st Cavalry Division's Restructure Study (DRS).

==== Post-Vietnam ====
For the next several years, 2-12 Cav (Mech) was engaged in the peacetime training and preparation of its officers, NCOs, and enlisted soldiers in the eventuality of a combat deployment to Europe during the Cold War against Warsaw Pact forces. Shortly after the arrival of the M1 Tank at Fort Hood in 1981, it was re-flagged as 3-10 Cav (Armor).

==== CONUS Reactivation ====
The unit was reactivated in 1986, with the mission of training Armor officers at Fort Knox. The battalion's colors were later moved to the First Team (i.e. 1st Cavalry Division) at Fort Hood, Texas in December 1992. Since then, the Chargers have served at places like the National Training Center at Fort Irwin, California. In the summer of 1995, Alpha company was called out with Task Force 1–5 CAV on a contingency response to hostilities in the Persian Gulf. A year later, from September to December 1996, Bravo and Charlie company deployed with Task Force 1–5 Cavalry again, this time as a part of 3rd Brigade for Operation Desert Strike. Despite not being on an alert status, Bravo and Charlie companies mustered, deployed, drew propositioned equipment and occupied defensive battle positions in 96 hours. Meanwhile, with two companies plus their support slices deployed, the remainder of the battalion turned in the battalion's 58 M1A1 HC tanks to General Dynamics War Reserve.

In January 1997, the 2nd Battalion drew the new M1A2 tanks. In June 1997 the entire task force deployed to Kuwait, drew propositioned equipment, and initiated a rigorous two and a half-month training cycle known as Intrinsic Action 97-02. The Chargers battled blowing sand, 130-plus degree temperatures, and 50-mile an hour winds, all while maintaining an above 90% operational readiness rate and a high quality of life for the soldiers.

==== Bosnia ====
In the fall of 1998 2nd Brigade was organized into a Task Force with 1–5 Inf and 1–12 Armor, to go to Bosnia as SFOR5. To avoid complication of two battalions of 'Chargers' 2–12 Armor was redesignated as the 'ThunderHorse' Battalion.

==== Operation Iraqi Freedom ====
In January 2004, 2nd Battalion deployed as part of 2nd Brigade in support of Operation Iraqi Freedom. The battalion conducted a relief in place with 2–70 Armor and assumed responsibility for a portion of western Baghdad including the Abu Ghraib district. In Abu Ghraib, Task Force 2–12 CAV included Annihilator A/1-5 CAV, Blackhawk B/2-12 CAV, Cold Steel C/2-12 CAV, Hound HHC/2-12 CAV, and a platoon of soldiers from the Estonian Scouts Battalion. TF Thunder operated in the Abu Ghraib area from January to October 2004 before conducting operations in support of the 39th BCT in the vicinity of Taji and subsequently the 1st Marine Division in the vicinity of Falluja from October to December 2004. In January 2005, Task Force Thunder began operations in the North Babil provence to support Iraqi elections. After elections, TF Thunder conducted a relief in place and moved to Kuwait to conduct redeployment operations. LTC Tim Ryan and CSM Robert Booker led the Task Force throughout the deployment.

In October 2006, 2nd Battalion deployed as part of 4th BCT, 1st Cavalry Division out of Ft. Bliss Texas to support Operation Iraqi Freedom. The battalion was attached to 2nd BCT, 1st Infantry Division in western Baghdad. As part of Task Force Dagger, 2nd Battalion patrolled the Baghdad neighborhoods of Gazyaliyah and Shulla. 2–12 CAV redeployed to Ft. Bliss in December 2007.

In March 2008, 2nd Battalion, 12th Cavalry was reflagged as 1st Battalion, 77th Armor. 3rd Battalion, 67th Armor, 4th Brigade Combat Team, 4th Infantry Division from Ft. Hood, Texas was then reflagged as 2nd Battalion, 12th Cavalry. The new 2d Battalion, 12th Cavalry then deployed to Tallil in southern Iraq in support of OIF 08-10 on 11 June 2008.

==== 2010s ====
In September 2010 2nd Battalion, 12th Cavalry deployed in support of "Operation New Dawn", this time to Kirkuk, Iraq.

In November 2012 2nd Battalion deployed to Laghman Province, Afghanistan (RC-East) as part of the 4th Security Forces Assistance Brigade. In October 2013, the 4th Brigade Combat Team was deactivated and 2nd Battalion, 12th Cavalry joined the 1st Brigade Combat Team at Fort Hood, TX.

In October and November 2014, 2nd Battalion mobilized to Germany with the rest of 1st Brigade Combat Team and participated in Operation Atlantic Combined Resolve III. Their mission was to reinforce multinational partnerships while gaining experience working directly with allied forces in simulated combat exercises.

== Current status ==
- 1st Battalion is a combined arms battalion of the 3rd Brigade, 1st Cavalry Division stationed at Fort Hood, Texas.
- 2nd Battalion is a combined arms battalion of the 1st Brigade, 1st Cavalry Division stationed at Fort Hood, Texas.
