= Landing Zone Baldy =

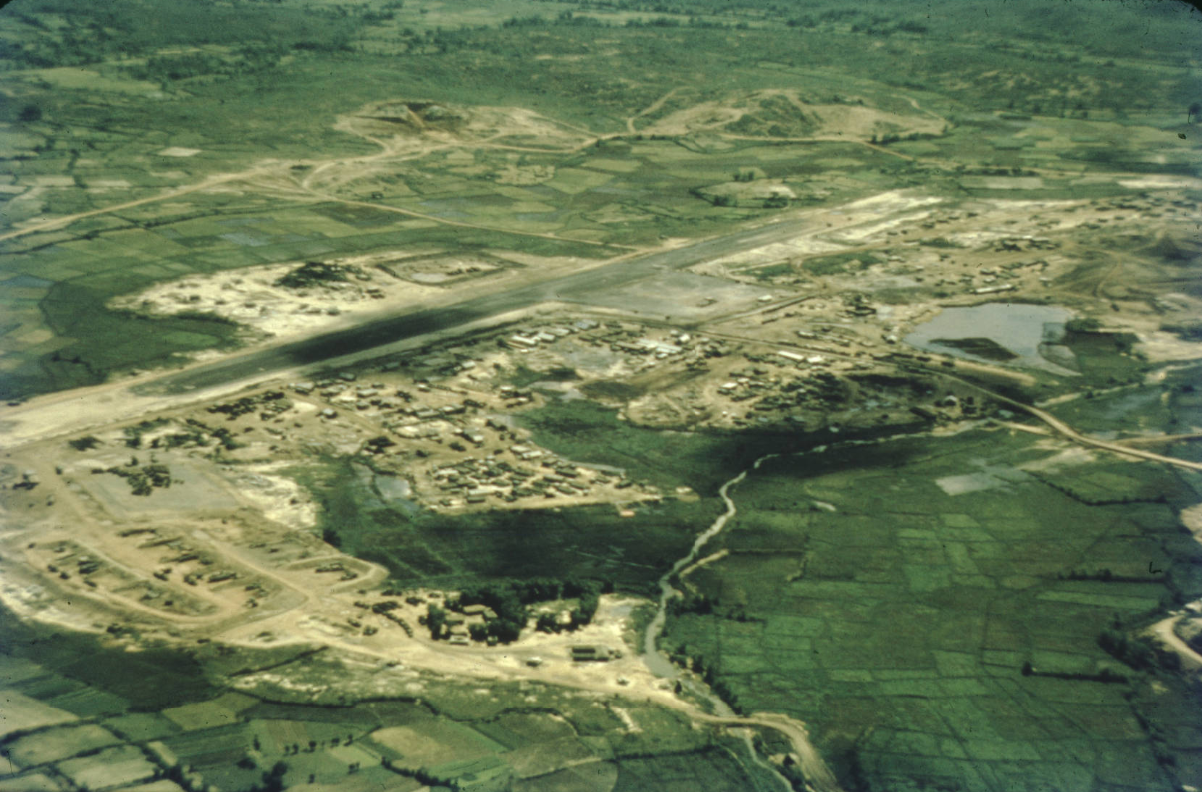
- LZ Baldy, 7 November 1968

Site information
- Type: Marines/Army

Location
- Coordinates: 15.766°N 108.324°E

Site history
- Built: 1967
- In use: 1967–72
- Battles/wars: Vietnam War

Garrison information
- Occupants: 196th Light Infantry Brigade; 7th Marine Regiment; 5th Marine Regiment

Airfield information
- IATA: none; ICAO: none

Summary

Runways
Direction	Length		Surface
Direction	ft	m	Surface
	2,400	732

Landing Zone Baldy (also known as FSB Baldy or Hill 63) was a United States Marine Corps, United States Army and Army of the Republic of Vietnam (ARVN) base located northwest of Chu Lai, Quảng Nam Province in central Vietnam.

== History ==
The base was located at the intersection of Highway 1 and Route 535, approximately 28 km northwest of Chu Lai.

Baldy was originally established by the U.S. Army 196th Light Infantry Brigade and was then taken over as the headquarters for the 7th Marines.

On the morning of 3 January 1968, the People's Army of Vietnam (PAVN) 2nd Division mortared Baldy as part of a series of attacks on four Marines bases.

In August 1969, a logistics support unit of Force Logistic Support Group Bravo was established at Baldy. In late 1969, the 3rd Battalion 11th Marines moved to Baldy.

In September 1970, the 7th Marines began to withdraw from the Quế Sơn Valley and the Baldy tactical area of operations as part of Operation Keystone Robin Alpha handing over control to the 5th Marine Regiment.

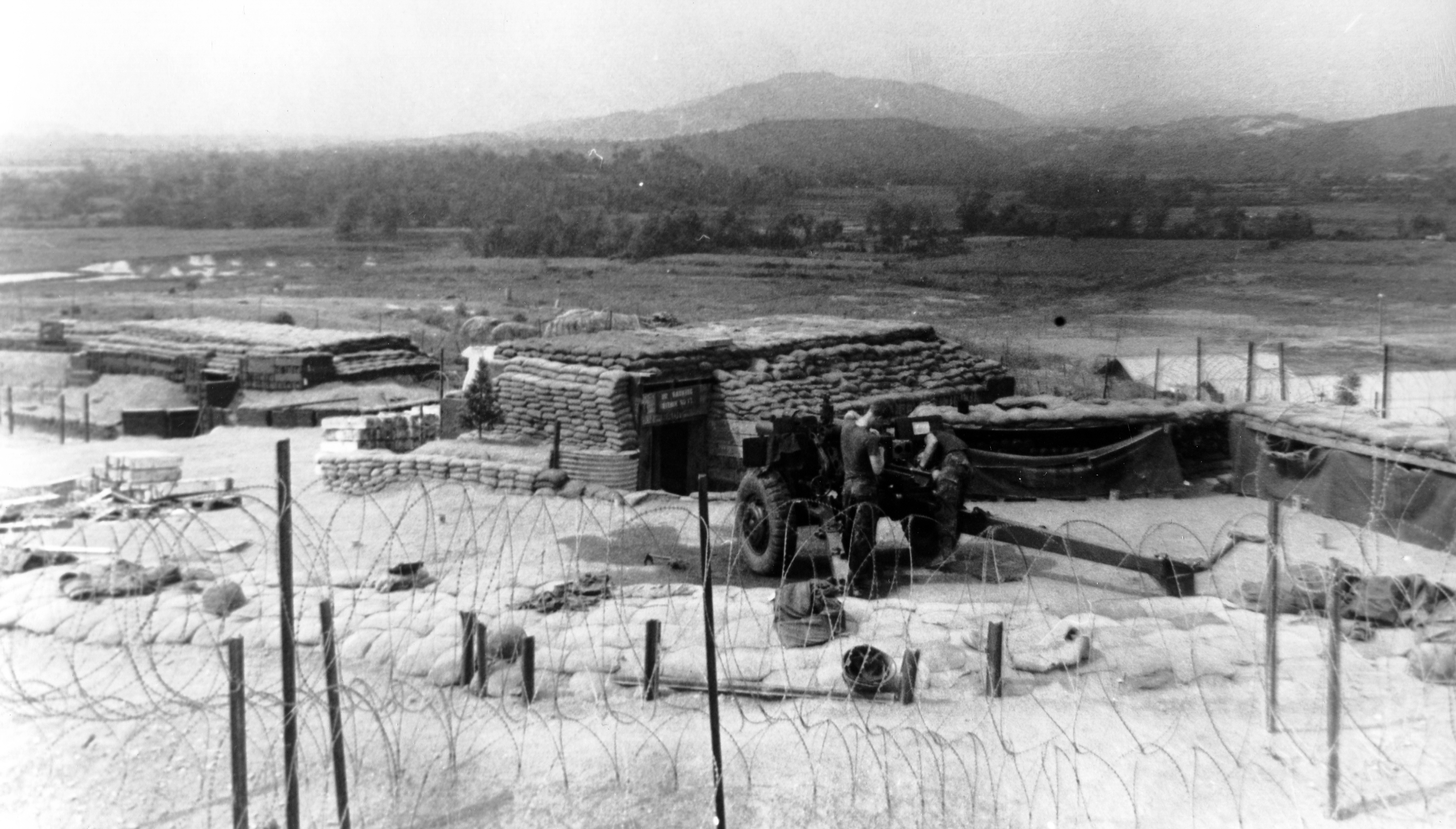
“K” Battery, 3rd Battalion, 11th Marines at Baldy, March 1970

From 2–15 October 1970, the U.S. Army's Task Force Saint comprising the 2nd Battalion, 1st Infantry, 1st Squadron, 1st Cavalry and a battery from the 3rd Battalion, 82nd Artillery was based at Baldy for Operation Tulare Falls I and returned again as Task Force Burnett from 27 to 31 October.

From 14 October 1970, the 1st Marine Aircraft Wing deployed a force of six CH-46Ds, 4 AH-1Gs and one UH-1E command ship to Baldy on a daily basis from Marble Mountain Air Facility to support 5th Marine quick reaction force (QRF) operations. In late November, the Korean 2nd Marine Brigade also stationed a QRF platoon at Baldy.

Baldy was a base for Marine combined action and pacification programmes throughout 1969–70.

In January 1971, as part of the general drawdown of U.S. forces the 23rd Infantry Division took over the Marines' tactical area of responsibility, but made it clear they would not take over the Marine bases at Baldy, Firebase Ross or Firebase Ryder. On 4 March 1971, Logistics Support Unit 3 at Baldy ceased operations. On 20 March 1971, the Marines turned over Baldy to the ARVN.

== Current use ==
The base appears to remain in use by the PAVN.
