= 3rd Brigade Combat Team, 1st Cavalry Division =

One of three basic maneuver units of the 1st Cavalry Division, US Army

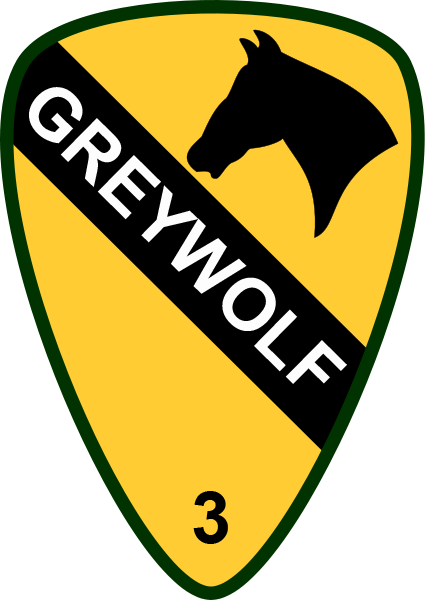
- 3rd Brigade logo
- Founded: 1917
- Country: United States
- Branch: United States Army
- Nickname: "Grey Wolf"

Commanders
- Notable commanders: George H. Cameron, Matthew J. Van Wagenen, John B. Gilliam

The 3rd Brigade Combat Team, 1st Cavalry Division ("Third Grey Wolf Brigade, 1st Cavalry Division") is a combined arms armored brigade of the 1st Cavalry Division based in Fort Hood, TX. Major equipment includes the M1A2SEP Tanks, M2A3 & M3A3 Bradley infantry fighting vehicles, M109A7 Paladin howitzers, and M1114 up-armored Humvees.

== Regiments ==
- 7th Cavalry Regiment
- 8th Cavalry Regiment
- 9th Cavalry Regiment
- 12th Cavalry Regiment
- 82nd Field Artillery Regiment

== Heraldry ==
The 3rd Brigade is a subordinate component of the 1st Cavalry Division and wears the same shoulder sleeve insignia.

== Initial organization ==
The 3rd Brigade, 1st Cavalry Division was first constituted on 29 August 1917. It was organized in December 1917 as Headquarters, 3rd Brigade, an element of the 15th Cavalry Division. The brigade demobilized on 15 July 1919. The brigade was reconstituted on 10 August 1921, joining the newly constituted 1st Cavalry Division. Never officially reorganized, the Brigade remained on inactive status until its activation on 15 October 1940.

== World War II ==
The brigade was converted and redesignated as HHC, 9th Armored Division Trains, and the unit deployed to the European Theater where it received campaign participation credit for the operations in Rhineland, Ardennes-Alsace, and Central Europe. The unit was awarded two Meritorious Unit Commendations with streamers embroidered Europe 1944 and Europe 1945. Following World War II, the unit returned to the United States and was inactivated.

== South Korea ==
The brigade remained inactive until 15 July 1963, when it was relieved from assignment to the 9th Armored Division, converted and redesignated as HHC, 3rd Brigade, 1st Cavalry Division. The brigade was activated on 1 September 1963, with the Division on station in Korea at the Korean Demilitarized Zone.

== Vietnam War ==
In July 1965, the division colors moved to Fort Benning and underwent reorganization as an airmobile unit. No soldiers moved, and the soldiers remaining in Korea put on the patch of the 2nd Infantry Division. The brigade was filled with soldiers from the 2nd Infantry Division and the 11th Airborne Division.

The 3rd Brigade, 1st Cavalry Division (Airmoble) sailed from Charleston, South Carolina to Qui Nhơn, Republic of Vietnam on 17 September 1965. The first major action undertaken by the brigade began on 10 October 1965, and was followed by participation in the Battle of Ia Drang (14 November, 15,17) officially known as the Pleiku Campaign. The 1st Cavalry Division (Airmobile) received the Presidential Unit Citation for the period 23 October to 26 November 1965.

While the rest of the division left South Vietnam at the end of April 1971, the 3rd Brigade was formed into a separate unit and assumed operational control of the old 1st Cavalry Division area of operations in South Vietnam until 1972.

On 20 June 1972 in a ceremony attended by COMUSMACV General Creighton Abrams the brigade stood down and left South Vietnam for Fort Hood, Texas, to rejoin the 1st Cavalry Division. When its colors arrived at Fort Hood on 29 June 1972, the unit officially became the "Greywolf" Brigade, named after General George Crook, considered the U.S. Army's greatest Indian fighter. The brigade underwent a change from an airmobile configuration to an infantry brigade (heavy or mechanized infantry). The "Greywolf" Brigade remained with the division until its inactivation in 1980.

The 3rd Brigade was composed of the following elements:

- HHC, 3d Brigade
- 1st Battalion, 7th Cavalry
- 2nd Battalion, 7th Cavalry
- 5th Battalion, 7th Cavalry (added while the unit was in South Vietnam)
- F Troop, 9th Cavalry

== Post Operation Desert Storm ==
The brigade remained on the inactive roles until 21 May 1991, when the 1st "Tiger" Brigade, 2nd Armored Division was redesignated as the 3rd "GREYWOLF" Brigade, 1st Cavalry Division. Since that time, the brigade has participated in several National Training Center rotations, deployed task force sized elements to Kuwait, and in September 1996, conducted the first post- Desert Storm, no-notice, brigade-sized deployment to Kuwait in support of Operation Desert Strike.

== Operation Iraqi Freedom II ==
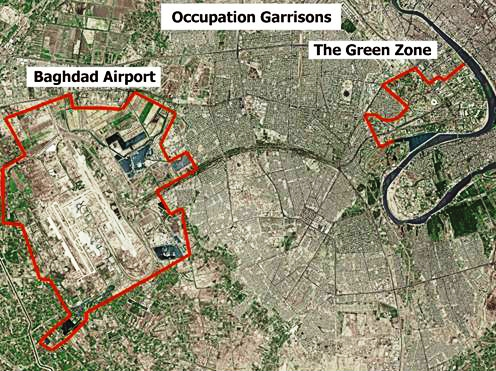
Aerial view and map of the Green Zone in Baghdad

In early 2004, 3d Brigade began deploying to Iraq for Operation Iraqi Freedom. The brigade protected the Green Zone and surrounding neighborhoods in Baghdad. The last elements returned home in March 2005.

The brigade was organized as follows:

- HHC, 3d Brigade
- 1st Battalion, 9th Cavalry
- 2nd Battalion, 7th Cavalry
- 3rd Battalion, 8th Cavalry
- F Troop, 9th Cavalry
- 2nd Battalion, 82nd Field Artillery
- 8th Engineer Battalion
- 215th Forward Support Battalion

The brigade re-task organized in Kuwait before entering Iraq:

- 2nd Battalion, 7th Cavalry was detached to the 39th Brigade Combat Team, Arkansas Army National Guard
- 1st Battalion, 153rd Infantry was attached from the 39th Infantry Brigade
- 1st Battalion, 161st Infantry was attached from the 81st Armored Brigade, Washington Army National Guard
- 112th MP Battalion, Mississippi Army National Guard

Also attached were:

- 571st Military Police Company;
- Troop F (Bristol), 2nd Squadron, 278th Armored Cavalry Regiment, Tennessee Army National Guard;
- Bravo Company, 1st Battalion, 160th Infantry, California Army National Guard
- a company from the 8th Marine Regiment;
- Additionally a large number of individuals from the Individual Ready Reserve joined the Brigade

The brigade received the following unit citations:

- HHC, 3rd Brigade was awarded a Meritorious Unit Citation (MUC) for the period of 17 March 2004 through 23 March 2005.
- 1st Battalion, 153rd Infantry was awarded an MUC (17 March 2004 – 23 March 2005)
- 1st Battalion, 161st Infantry was awarded an MUC (17 March 2004 – 23 March 2005)
- 3rd Battalion, 8th Cavalry was awarded an MUC (23 March 2004 – 5 March 2005)
- 2nd Battalion, 82nd Artillery was awarded an MUC (17 March 2004 – 23 March 2005)

== Modularization ==
Under the modularization of the 1st Cavalry Division, two battalions were transferred to 4th Brigade and the 8th Engineers were inactivated. One battalion was transferred in from 1st Brigade, F Troop was expanded into a squadron, and a special troops battalion was organized.

- HHC, 3 ABCT
- 6th Squadron (RSTA), 9th Cavalry Regiment
- 1st Battalion, 12th Cavalry Regiment
- 3rd Battalion, 8th Cavalry Regiment
- 2nd Battalion, 82nd Field Artillery Regiment
- Special Troops Battalion
- 215th Support Battalion (Brigade)

== Operation Iraqi Freedom 2006–07 ==
In September 2006 the 3rd "GREYWOLF" Brigade began deploying to Iraq for its second OIF combat tour. During this tour, it was deployed to the Diyala Province and based out of Baqubah. While serving as the main regional force for Coalition efforts in the area it fell under the command of Multi-National Division-North (MND-N). During the 2006–2008 tour MND-N was commanded by the 25th Infantry Division and based out of COB Speicher in Tikrit. The brigade was a part of the controversial theater "extension" that increased all combat tours to 15 months. This pushed their re-deployment home from theater to December 2007.

== Operation Iraqi Freedom 2008–09 ==
In December 2008 the GREYWOLF Troopers deployed to Iraq for their third tour. On 19 January 2009, they assumed control of FOB Marez in Mosul from the "Brave Rifles" of the 3rd Armored Cavalry Regiment. As during their last Iraq rotation the Greywolf Brigade were once again under the 25th Infantry Division and MND-N.

== Operation New Dawn 2011 ==
In January 2011, the GREYWOLF Brigade deployed to the southern provinces of Iraq with forces in Muthanna, Dhi Qar, Maysan and Basrah. The primary mission of the brigade was to continue to improve Iraqi Army and Police forces through an Advise and Assist mission. Their secondary mission was to conduct route security missions to assist in maintaining open ground lines of communication. Both missions would support the United States military forces eventual departure from Iraq in December 2011. On 17 December 2011, Greywolf's Special Troops Battalion was the last combat unit to redeploy from the war-torn nation, thus ending America's 9-year long war.

== Reorganization ==
With the inactivation of the 4th Brigade Combat Team "Long Knife" in 2013, 2nd Battalion, 7th Cavalry Regiment rejoined the Brigade after 8 years. The 3rd Engineer Battalion replaced the 3rd Special troops Battalion which had been formed from the 8th Engineer Battalion in 2005.

== Current organization ==
- Headquarters and Headquarters Troop (HHT), 3rd Brigade Combat Team (3rd BCT)
- 6th Squadron, 9th Cavalry (RSTA) Reconnaissance Surveillance and Target Acquisition "Saber"
- 2nd Battalion, 7th Cavalry "Ghost"
- 3rd Battalion, 8th Cavalry "Warhorse"
- 1st Battalion, 12th Cavalry "Chargers"
- 2nd Battalion, 82nd Field Artillery Regiment (2-82nd FAR) "Steel Dragons"
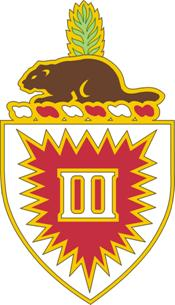
- 3rd Brigade Engineer Battalion (3rd BEB)"Beavers"
- 215th Brigade Support Battalion (215th BSB)"Blacksmiths"

== Campaign participation credit ==
Conflict	Streamer	Year(s)
World War II	Rhineland	1944
World War II	Ardennes-Alsace	1944
World War II	Central Europe	1944
Vietnam War	Vietnam Defense	1965
Vietnam War	Counteroffensive, Phase I	1965–1966
Vietnam War	Counteroffensive, Phase II	1966–1967
Vietnam War	Counteroffensive, Phase III	1967–1968
Vietnam War	Tet Counteroffensive	1968
Vietnam War	Counteroffensive, Phase IV	1968
Vietnam War	Counteroffensive, Phase V	1968
Vietnam War	Counteroffensive, Phase VI	1968–1969
Vietnam War	Tet 69/Counteroffensive	1969
Vietnam War	Summer–Fall 1969	1969
Vietnam War	Winter–Spring 1970	1970
Vietnam War	Sanctuary Counteroffensive	1970
Vietnam War	Counteroffensive, Phase VII	1970–1971
Vietnam War	Consolidation I	1971
Vietnam War	Consolidation II	1971–1972
Vietnam War	Cease-Fire	1972–1973
Iraq War	Iraqi Governance	2004
Iraq War	National Resolution	2005
Iraq War	Iraqi Surge	2008
Iraq War	Iraqi Sovereignty	2009
Iraq War	New Dawn	2011

== Decorations ==
Ribbon	Award	Year	Inscription
	Army Presidential Unit Citation	23 October to 26 November 1965	PLEIKU PROVINCE
	Army Valorous Unit Award		QUANG TIN PROVINCE
	Army Valorous Unit Award	May 1970	FISH HOOK
	Army Meritorious Unit Commendation (as HHC, 9th Armored Division)	1944	EUROPE 1944
	Army Meritorious Unit Commendation (as HHC, 9th Armored Division)	1945	EUROPE 1945
	Army Meritorious Unit Commendation	2004–2005	IRAQ
	Army meritorious Unit Commendation	2008–2009	IRAQ
	Army Meritorious Unit Commendation	2011	IRAQ
	Republic of Vietnam Gallantry Cross with Palm	1965–1969	VIETNAM
	Republic of Vietnam Gallantry Cross with Palm	1969–1970	VIETNAM
	Republic of Vietnam Gallantry Cross with Palm	1970–1971	VIETNAM
	Republic of Vietnam Gallantry Cross with Palm	1971–1972	VIETNAM
	Republic of Vietnam Civil Actions Medal with Palm	1969–1970	VIETNAM

== See also ==
1st Cavalry Division

1st Brigade Combat Team, 1st Cavalry Division

2nd Brigade Combat Team, 1st Cavalry Division
