= Jack – J97 =

Vietnamese singer

Jack J97
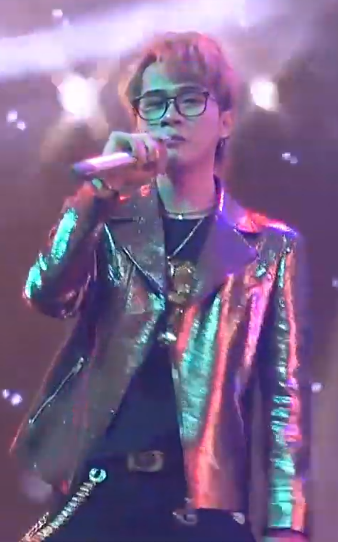
- Jack in 2019
- Born: Trịnh Trần Phương Tuấn; April 12, 1997 (age 29); Bến Tre, Vĩnh Long Province, Vietnam
- Occupations: Singer-songwriter; Rapper; Actor
- Years active: 2018–present
- Children: 1
- Musical career
- Genres: V-pop; EDM
- Instruments: Vocals; Guitar; Piano
- Label: J97 Entertainment
- Website: www.facebook.com/PhuongTuan1997

Trịnh Trần Phương Tuấn (born April 12, 1997), better known by his stage name Jack – J97 (or simply Jack), is a Vietnamese singer, songwriter, rapper, and actor.

He rose to fame during his time in the hip-hop group G5R. Throughout his career, he has received many accolades: three awards at the Green Wave Awards and four awards at the Zing Music Awards. In addition, he was named the Best New Asian Artist of Vietnam at the 2019 Mnet Asian Music Awards and Best Southeast Asian Act at the 2020 MTV Europe Music Awards, and received the 26th Golden Apricot Blossom Award (2020) for Best Light Music Male Singer. He is also the first Vietnamese artist to win an Asian Television Award for Best Music Video Act with "Hoa Hải Đường".

== Life and career ==
=== Early life and the beginning of career ===
Jack was born on April 12, 1997, in Ngai Dang Commune, Mo Cay Nam District, Ben Tre Province. He graduated from the professional college in vocal major at the Ben Tre Trade School of Culture and Arts. In an interview with VnExpress, he said:

"I never thought I would enter the entertainment business because I lived a closed life. I started as a music teacher in a local elementary school, with a salary of 5,000,000₫-6,000,000₫ per month."

Jack used to be a member in the group G5R, an underground Vietnamese music group. He debuted in several music videos with this group, such as "Giai Dieu Mien Tay". He became popular within the underground Vietnamese music industry when he released the music video "Ve Ben Anh", however it was not as popular in V-pop. On February 19, 2019, Jack released the song "Hồng nhan" with a music video on YouTube. Within its first week of release, the song debuted at No. 2 on Zing MP3, eventually reaching No. 1. The song has more than 13 million streams on Zing MP3 and 10 million views on YouTube after one week. Due to the popularity of this song, Jack was compared to Phan Mạnh Quỳnh and Đen Vâu. From there, he emerged as a music phenomenon.

=== 2019: Cooperation with K-ICM ===
After "Sóng gió" became a hit, he departed from the group G5R. After that, he collaborated with music producer K-ICM and released the song "Bạc Phận" in April 2019. Together, they continued the story series of "Sóng gió" and it was widely received. Later, Jack collaborated with producer Liam and performed the song "Sao em vô tình". These ballad-oriented music products were well-received by the public. Continuing his collaboration with K-ICM, Jack released the song "Sóng gió" and promoted it as the third part of "Hồng nhan". After its release, the song gained massive viewership on YouTube. He also released songs such as "Em gì ơi", "Việt Nam tôi" and "Hoa vô sắc". Since then, his name has occupied a high position in the V-pop music scene. However, by the end of 2019, there was a rumor circulating on Internet that he and K-ICM were at odds, and K-ICM exploiting Jack's labor. In response, he posted on his Facebook account that the release of "Hoa vô sắc" was only a demo version. The song has just been recorded as a test without singing in parts. However, K-ICM voluntarily posted this song on his YouTube channel. After an interview with the content affirming "not exploiting Jack", K-ICM received many negative reactions from the audience.

=== 2020−2021: Solo activities and Running Man Vietnam ===
After his controversy with K-ICM, he is said to have collaborated with ViruSs to release a demo of the song "Đom đóm" on December 29, 2019. The demo reached No.1 of YouTube trending Vietnam within 4 hours.

On February 17, 2020, Jack officially announced his own YouTube channel called J97. After joining Nomad MGMT Vietnam, he released the song "La 1 Thang Con Trai" on March 10, 2020, on J97's YouTube channel in association with music producer Hoaprox. The song received positive reactions from artists and fans, with some saying that this is just the beginning of Jack's challenge with various types of music.

In addition, he received the YouTube Silver Play Button within a few hours after he created his channel. Soon after, J97 quickly surpassed Bà Tân Vlog, becoming the fastest channel to receive the YouTube Gold Play Button in Vietnam within seven days of creating a channel.

On September 22, 2020, Jack officially released the music video of his first self-produced song "Hoa Hai Duong". The video reached 1 million views in 20 minutes. After 24 hours, "Hoa Hai Duong" became trending on YouTube in seven countries, including Taiwan, Canada, Australia, Germany, United States and South Korea, and it also led the sale of music on iTunes Vietnam.

On October 6, 2020, MTV Vietnam officially announced the artists who would represent Vietnam to compete at MTV Europe Music Awards 2020 and the 2020 Asian Television Awards. Jack overcame many singers as Duc Phuc, Hoang Thuy Linh, Han Sara, Binz, and more to become the winner of the domestic voting. On November 9, 2020, after over one month of voting process, MTV Europe called Jack as the winner of the Best Southeast Asian Artist category by livestream, surpassing a series of names from Southeast Asia. Thus, Jack is the fourth Vietnamese artist after My Tam (2013), Son Tung M-TP (2015) and Dong Nhi (2016) to win this award. On November 22, 2020, Jack joined FWD Music Tour in Danang and release a demo of the song "Thứ anh cần là melody".

On December 26, 2020, Jack officially released the song Dom Dom. This was considered one of the most anticipated songs not only for Jack's fans but also for many V-pop followers. Dom Dom accumulated 295,556 premiere views on YouTube. The song quickly rose to No. 1 of Zing MP3 Chart within one hour and 4 minutes, setting a V-pop record in 2020. After two days of launch, Dom Dom has reaped great successes: reaching No 1 on trending of YouTube in Vietnam and entering the top trending in many other countries: top 9 in Taiwan, top 28 in Germany, top 24 of YouTube Trending worldwide and top 2 in iTunes Vietnam.

At the Zing Music Awards 2020 held on January 7, 2021, Jack won 2 awards, Most Popular Male Artist and Most Favorite Dance/Electronic Song with the song Hoa Hải Đường.

On January 14, 2021, at the 26th Golden Apricot Blossom Awards (Mai Vang) Ceremony, Jack was named as the winner of the Most Favorite Light Music Male Singer Act. This is the first Golden Apricot Blossom Award in his singing career. On January 16, 2021, the 2020 Asian Television Awards Organizing Committee named Jack's Hoa Hai Duong as the winning MV in the Best Music Video category. This is the second international award after the MTV EMA that Jack achieved in his singing career.

On April 12, 2021, on his 24th birthday, Jack released the song "Laylalay", in collaboration with DTAP with the music video directed by Đinh Hà Uyên Thư, but didn't get as many premiere views as his previous releases.

Jack was revealed to be the 9th member in the lineup for the second season of Running Man Vietnam, but he departed from the show after only four episodes.

=== 2022 -present: J97 Entertainment ===
On July 13, 2022, Jack announced a poster for a new product titled "Ngôi sao cô đơn", marking his return after nearly a year of hiatus due to emotional noise. On July 15, the teaser of the music video "Ngôi sao cô đơn" was released, attracting the attention of the audience, reaching more than 18 thousand comments after being posted on YouTube. On July 19, the video was officially released. On October 5, it was reported that Jack officially left Nomad MGMT Vietnam company after 3 years of working together and established his own company called J97 Entertainment. On January 12, 2023, Jack officially acknowledged this information.

On November 5, 2022 and January 15, 2023, Jack released 2 music videos on Youtube respectively "Cuối cùng thì" and "Trịnh Gia" in the form of Special Stage performance.

On August 5, 2023, Jack released teaser music video "Xoá tên anh đi", marking the release of his first album "26". The music video will be officially released on August 10, 2023.

== Artistry ==
Tuan's stage name "Jack" was inspired by his father's love to movie star Jackie Chan.

Jack's most prominent music products include "Hồng Nhan", "Bạc Phận" and "Sóng Gió" which is a blend of pop, electronic music, and Vietnamese folk music. In an interview with Zing News, Jack asserted that his songs are "a sadness of nostalgia combined by Chinese and Vietnamese music". Regarding his vocal, he is judged by the public to have a unique vocal. Jack himself once admitted that he "can sing songs that he has in tune with in terms of genre, lyrics, melody or story." Writing on Vietnamnet, the journalist Le Thi My Niem evaluated about Jack:

"There are 3 phases in his less than 2 years career: sticking with G5R; sticking with K-ICM; and the phase at the current company. Every phase, Jack may be slightly different but never lost the "Jack” quality – which encapsulates two qualities: young and popular. Until Hoa Hai Duong, in terms of music, Jack is still Jack. He is quiet, not good at speaking but in music, the audience often feels that this is "his heaven" where he unleashes his soul and sentences. Keeping his identity is a good thing. He still lives discreet, unbearable, uncolorful. In turn, in music, Jack is gradually gaining more love from fans."

Zing News journalist Quang Duc evaluated about Jack's music in 2020:

"Là 1 Thằng Con Trai in March is an electronic song mixed with disco and rap material, "Hoa Hai Duong" then is the combination of folk with harmonious style with future bass sound. This time, Jack brought a pop ballad song "Đom Đóm" through the hands of two producers ViruSs and 1HIT. "

== Public image ==
On September 23, 2020, Vivo Vietnam officially announced Jack to become the brand ambassador for Vivo V20. Jack said:

"To talk about the reason for this collaboration, that is the similarity between Jack and Vivo Vietnam are derived from the genuine feelings, in order to bring the best things to everyone. Jack wants to send in sincerity through the music products. And so is Vivo, each its product is created by the understanding of users, to bring them the best experiences".

On October 5, 2020, PlayerUnknown's Battlegrounds Mobile Vietnam officially announced that Jack will be the brand ambassador in Vietnam. Jack will cooperate with PUBGM to do meaningful things for his fan community in particular and the society in general, starting with a fundraising project for the Vietnam Children's Fund called "Road Running To Morning". This is also an affirmation of Jack not to be only as a talented singer, but also a person who has a positive influence on society.

On December 3, 2020, YouTube Vietnam announced 3 trending charts: Top 10 Most Featured Videos 2020, Top 10 Most Featured Music Videos 2020 and Top 10 Most Featured Videos Creators in 2020, in which, in the category of Top 10 Most Featured Music Videos, there were two of his music videos "Hoa Hai Duong" and "La 1 Thang Con Trai" respectively ranked at No.6 and No.2.

On December 9, 2020, Google Vietnam announced The Google's Year in Search 2020 with many search topics. With two songs "Hoa Hai Duong" and "Song Gio" in the 'Top 10 Most Featured Songs of the Year', Jack personally ranked 3rd in Top 10 Most Searched People of the Year. Jack was the most prominent singer in 2020 with the great interest from the Vietnamese public.

== Other ventures ==
=== Philanthropy ===
On March 28, 2020, Jack's mother presented at the Cultural Center of Ben Tre to donate 100,000,000₫ for the COVID-19 prevention support. In addition, Jack also transferred 50,000,000₫ to the fans' fund to support the fight against drought at his hometown. Then, on August 13, 2020, he donated for Da Nang 200,000 medical masks to support the COVID-19 prevention.

== Controversies ==
The song released in 2019 in collaboration with his K-ICM, "Em Gì Ơi", was accused of plagiarizing a Thai children's song titled "ฝนเทลงมา" by channel พอดี ม่วน STUDIO on YouTube. Then, in 2021, this song continued to be accused of being similar to the first measures of the song "Vì ai em ra đi?" by Akira Phan.

"Đom đóm" was believed to have been copied from the song "Blue and white porcelain" (青花瓷) by Jay Chou

The demo song "Thứ anh cần là melody" (now is the chorus of the song "LayLaLay") was suspected of plagiarizing the song "It Ain't Me" by Kygo featuring Selena Gomez and the chorus of the song "Read My Mind" by The Killers.

"Ngôi sao cô đơn" was widely believed by many netizens to have plagiarized the Weeknd's song "Blinding Lights". "Cuối cùng thì" was widely believed by many netizens to have plagiarized Fujii Kaze's song "Matsuri" and Jay Chou's song "Fearless".

== Personal life ==
On August 7, 2021, a post along with many audio recordings and an image of a stamped birth certificate of a woman named Thúy Vy accused Jack of having multiple sexual relationships and had a child named "Sol" with his ex-girlfriend Thiên An – who starred with him in music video "Sóng Gió" in 2019, went viral online. The next day, Thiên An confirmed it on her Facebook account. The incident has initiated one of the most complicated and longest-lasting scandals in the history of Vietnamese showbiz.

On August 10, 2021, Jack posted a status on his fan page, admitted having a voluntary relationship with Thiên An. He apologized to his fans and promised to take responsibility for this incident.

In 2025, Thiên An revealed that she and Jack previously had two children before Sol, both of which were aborted by request of his family.

== Discography ==
=== Singles ===
Title (Vietnamese)	Year of release
"Giai điệu miền Tây"	2018
"Mẹ ơi 2"	2018
"Để đó anh lo"	2018
"Về bên anh"	2018
"Hồng nhan"	2019
"Bạc phận"	2019
"Sao em vô tình"	2019
"Sóng gió"	2019
"Em gì ơi"	2019
"Việt Nam tôi"	2019
"Hoa vô sắc"	2019
"Là 1 thằng con trai"	2020
"Hoa hải đường"	2020
"Đom đóm"	2020
"LAYLALAY"	2021
"Ngôi sao cô đơn"	2022
"Cuối cùng thì"	2022
"Xoá tên anh đi"	2023
"Từ nơi tôi sinh ra"	2023
"Chúng ta rồi sẽ hạnh phúc"	2023
"Thiên lý ơi"	2024
"Dưới tán cây khô hoa nở"	2024
"01 Ngoại lệ"	2025
"Trạm Dừng Chân"	2025
"Vực thẳm của bình yên"	2025

== Filmography ==
Year	Show	Role	Note	Ref
2019	Odd One In (Người bí ẩn)	Guest	Season 6, Episode 4	
2019	Happy Lunch (Buổi trưa vui vẻ)	Guest	July 25, 2019, episode	
2019	Sóng Gió – Hồi kết	Starring with K-ICM, Thiên An 5tr	Short comedy	
2019	7 Smiles of Spring (7 nụ cười mai)	Guest	Season 3, Episode 1	
2019	The Voice Kids of Vietnam	Guest	Season 7, Episode 14	
2020	The Waves 20	Guest		
2020	The Waves of VieON	Guest		
2020	Can't take my eyes off	Starring with Lê Huỳnh Thuý Ngân	Short comedy	
2021	The Waves 21	Guest		
2021	Running Man Vietnam	Cast member	Season 2, Episodes 1–4	

== Awards and nominations ==
Year	Award	Act	Nomination for	Result	Ref
2019	Green Wave (radio show) Awards	Singer of the Year	Himself	Nominated	
2019	Green Wave (radio show) Awards	Best New Artist	Himself	Won	
2019	Green Wave (radio show) Awards	Best Collaboration	Sóng gió	Nominated	
2019	Green Wave (radio show) Awards	Song of The Year	Sóng gió	Nominated	
2019	Green Wave (radio show) Awards	Phenomenon Song	Sóng gió	Nominated	
2019	Green Wave (radio show) Awards	Top 10 most favorite songs	Sóng gió	Won	
2019	Green Wave (radio show) Awards	Most Favorite song on Radio	Sóng gió	Won	
2019	Zing Music Award	Most Favorite Male Singer	Himself	Won	
2019	Zing Music Award	Most Favorite Pop/Ballad Song	Sóng gió	Won	
2019	Mnet Asian Music Awards	Best New Asian Artist Vietnam	Himself	Won	
2020	2020 MTV Europe Music Awards	MTV Europe Music Award for Best Southeast Asian Act	Himself	Won	
2020	Golden Apricot Blossom Awards	Most Favorite Light music Male singer	Himself	Won	
2020	Zing Music Award	Artist of The Year	Himself	Nominated	
2020	Zing Music Award	Most favorite Dance/Electronic song	Hoa Hải Đường	Won	
2020	Zing Music Award	Most Favorite Male Artist	Himself	Won	
2020	Star of the Year	Male Singer	Himself	Won	
2020	Asian Television Awards	Best Music Video	Hoa Hải Đường	Won	
2020	Green Wave (radio show) Awards	Male Singer of the Year	Himself	Nominated	
2020	Green Wave (radio show) Awards	Music Video of the Year	Hoa Hải Đường	Nominated	
2020	Green Wave (radio show) Awards	Song of the Year	Hoa Hải Đường	Nominated	
2020	Green Wave (radio show) Awards	Best Collaboration	With DTAP	Nominated	
2020	Green Wave (radio show) Awards	Most Favorite Male Singer	Himself	Won	
2020	Green Wave (radio show) Awards	Top 10 Most Favorite Songs	Hoa Hải Đường	Won	
2020	Wechoice Awards	Singer with the breakthrough activities	Himself	Won	
2020	Wechoice Awards	Music Video of the Year	Hoa Hải Đường	Nominated	
