= Paris by Night 87 =

PBN Talent Show - Finals
- Paris by Night episode
- Poster for PBN 87
- Episode no.: Episode 87
- Directed by: Michael Watt
- Masters of ceremonies: Nguyễn Cao Kỳ Duyên; Nguyễn Văn Thịnh; To Chan Phong
- Filmed at: Buena Park, California
- Filmed on: February 10, 2007
- Venue: Knott's Berry Farm
- Executive producers: Marie To; Paul Huynh
- Format: 2-Disc DVD
- Release date: April 26, 2007

Paris By Night 87: PBN Talent Show - Finals is a Paris By Night program produced by Thúy Nga that was filmed at Knott's Berry Farm in Buena Park, California on February 10, 2007. This is the first Paris By Night's Talent Show. This Talent Show consists of Paris By Night 86 - Semifinal and Paris by Night 87 - Final. After the Semi-Final, there are 7 remaining contestants in the final.

== Winners ==
Judges' Choice: Trịnh Lam

People's Choice: David Meng

Trịnh Lam polled the most votes among the live audience, who were given ballots. The People's Choice award also includes internet and phone voting where there is no limit on how many times one can vote.

== Track list ==
Disk 1

1. Ngôi Sao Đêm Nay (Fame) – 13 Thí Sinh & Paris By Night Dancers
2. Giới Thiệu Ban Giám Khảo – Thái Thanh, Shanda Sawyer, Nhật Ngân, Đức Huy, Huỳnh Thi
3. All I Want – Roni Trọng
4. Người Đàn Ông Chân Thật – David Meng
5. Nỗi Buồn Chim Sáo – Ngọc Loan
6. Có Phải Em Mùa Thu Hà Nội – Hương Giang
7. Mưa Hồng – Quỳnh Vi
8. Bay Cùng Tình Yêu – Mai Tiến Dũng
9. Giọt Nắng Bên Thềm – Trần Thái Hòa
10. Một Lần Cuối – Trịnh Lam
11. Tình Yêu Vội Đi – Ngọc Liên
12. Hai Kich: Mộng Ca Sĩ – Hoài Linh, Chí Tài, Hữu Lộc, Calvin Hiệp

Disk 2

1. Chiều Một Mình Qua Phố – Quang Dũng
2. Chỉ Có Một Thời – Quang Dũng
3. Unchain My Heart – Khánh Hà, Hoài Phương, Trịnh Lam
4. Chồng Xa – Tâm Đoan, Văn Phi Thông, Ngọc Loan
5. Vầng Trăng Khóc – Roni Trọng, Mai Tiến Dũng, Triệu Bảo Vi, Hương Giang, Quỳnh Vi
6. Cát Bụi Tình Xa – Ngọc Liên, Trần Thái Hòa, Ngô Quang Minh, Huy Tâm
7. Trả Hết Cho Người – Nguyễn Hưng, David Meng, Sunny Lương
8. Sóng Về Đâu – Khánh Hà
9. Cho Vừa Lòng Em – Tâm Đoan
10. Biết Làm Gì Hơn – Nguyễn Hưng
11. Sometimes When We Touch – Lưu Bích
12. Còn Lại Nhớ Thương – Tú Quyên
13. Ngôi Sao Đêm Nay (Fame) – Hợp Ca

Bonus

1. Hạnh Phúc Quanh Đây (MTV) – Mai Quốc Huy
2. Ru Em – Văn Phi Thông
3. Không Còn Mùa Thu – Huy Tâm
4. Đam Mê – Triệu Bảo Vi
5. Xin Lỗi Tình Yêu – Sunny Lương
6. Trái Tim Hoang Đường – Hoài Phương
7. Đêm Đông – Ngô Quang Minh

Preceded by Paris By Night 86: PBN Talent Show - Semi-Finals	Paris By Night; Paris By Night 87: PBN Talent Show - Finals	Succeeded by Paris By Night 88: Lam Phương - Đường Về Quê Hương
