= Hoai =

Hoài
- Pronunciation: Northern Vietnamese: [hwaːj˨˩] Central Vietnamese: [hwaːj˦˩] Southern Vietnamese: [waːj˨˩]
- Gender: Unisex
- Language: Vietnamese

Origin
- Meaning: 懷: to cherish, harbor in one's mind

Hoài is a unisex Vietnamese given name. The name may come from the Sino-Vietnamese reading of the Chinese character 懷.

== Notable people ==
- Bùi Thị Minh Hoài (born 1965), Vietnamese politician
- Hoài Lâm (born 1995), Vietnamese pop singer and actor
- Hoài Linh (born 1969), Vietnamese comedian and actor
- Phạm Thị Hoài (born 1960), Vietnamese writer, editor and translator
- Trần Văn Hoài (1929–2010), Vietnamese Roman Catholic prelate and activist
- Võ Hoài Nam (born 1965), Vietnamese actor
