= Mỹ Thái (disambiguation) =

Mỹ Thái may refer to:

- Mỹ Thái, Bắc Giang, a rural commune of Lạng Giang District
- Mỹ Thái, Kiên Giang, a rural commune of Hòn Đất District
