= Bà Tân Vlog =

Vietnamse YouTuber (born 1967)

- Born: January 22, 1967 (age 59); Chua Village, Xuan Huong, Lang Giang, Ha Bac, Vietnam

YouTube information
- Channel: Bà Tân Vlog
- Years active: 2018–present
- Genres: Cooking; entertainment; vlog
- Subscribers: 4.63 million
- Views: 1.1 billion
- Last updated: 19 August 2026

Nguyễn Thị Tân (born January 22, 1967 in Bac Giang), commonly known as Bà Tân Vlog, is a Vietnamese YouTuber. As of August 2026, her channel has over 4.63 million subscribers and over 1.1 billion views on her YouTube channel Bà Tân Vlog.

With reaching 1 million subscribers, her channel is in the top 3 YouTube channels with the most subscribers in a single day and sets a Vietnamese record. She was also a Vietnamese social media phenomenon in mid-2019. She is the first female farmer to receive the Gold Play Button, with a timeframe of 20 days to receive the Gold Play Button.

== Biography ==
She lives in Chua village, Xuan Huong commune, Lang Giang district, Bac Giang province. She is a farmer in difficult circumstances. She had to borrow money and mortgage her land title to cover living expenses, pay for her children's education, and treat her husband's cancer in Hanoi. After her husband passed away, she had to raise her children alone and bear a huge debt. In addition, she also worked various jobs such as construction laborer and rice transplanter to earn extra income. She has three children: two sons and one daughter: Nguyễn Văn Hưng, Nguyễn Văn Hậu, and Nguyễn Thanh Lương (adopted child).

== Famous ==
Around the beginning of 2019, Hưng Vlog, the channel of Hưng – Bà Tân's eldest son – started making videos featuring his mother. This led many of Hưng's followers to recognize Mrs. Tan. He created a separate channel for his mother, and unexpectedly, Bà Tân became a social media phenomenon.

On May 25, 2019, Bà Tân Vlog's channel reached 1 million subscribers in just 20 days after its first video was released. This is a rare occurrence for Vietnamese YouTube channels, as no other channel has ever reached 1 million subscribers so quickly. Furthermore, the channel ranked 3rd among YouTube channels with the highest subscriber growth in a single day (according to Social Blade). The Swedish YouTuber PewDiePie was also surprised and skeptical when he accidentally discovered her YouTube channel during one of his livestreams on the DLive platform.

On May 29, 2019, Vietnam Television invited her to participate in the "Người phụ nữ hạnh phúc" program of the Entertainment Programs Production Department - Vietnam Television and quickly contacted the Vietnam Record Organization to confirm her record, just 4 days after reaching 1 million subscribers.

On June 9, 2019, the Vietnam Record Organization awarded the record to Bà Tân. On the same day, the Bà Tân Vlog channel reached 2 million subscribers, 15 days after reaching 1 million and 35 days after the first video was uploaded.

On June 23, 2019, she appeared in the 5th season, episode 6 of the show "Người bí ẩn" alongside Trấn Thành, Việt Hương, singer Ngọc Sơn, and artist Ngọc Huyền.

On October 23rd, she appeared on the comedy show "Thách Thức Danh Hài" and reached round 4, winning a prize of 40 million VND.

== Featured ==
The common thread in her videos is food, featuring dishes prepared in large quantities or oversized portions in a single cooking session. She also has iconic quotes such as:

"Cuộc đời bà đã gần sáu mươi nồi bánh chưng rồi mà bà chưa thấy cái nào ... như cái này các cháu ạ."

"Xin chào tất cả các cháu đã quay trở lại kênh Youtube của Bà Tân Vlog"

"Hôm nay, bà lại làm món ... siêu to khổng lồ các cháu nhé!"

== Social issues ==
What's unusual about her videos is that, at first glance, they seem very ordinary, yet they're more successful than music videos by expensive singers. Cultural researchers explain this by saying: "These clips are all aimed at young people, and their appeal comes from their simplicity and naturalness. Although the dishes aren't sophisticated or difficult to prepare, the local accent, the costumes, and the unpretentious, makeup-free appearance of the characters turn out to be a plus in the eyes of viewers."

== Affect ==
The "Senior Citizens on YouTube" phenomenon existed even before the establishment of the Bà Tân Vlog channel. One such channel, "61-Year-Old Grandma," became an instant sensation and garnered significant attention. Since Bà Tân Vlog's rise to fame, YouTube has seen the emergence of numerous other channels capitalizing on her popularity. These channels primarily feature everyday life scenes, such as farming and cooking traditional rural dishes.

== See also ==
- List of YouTubers
