= Tân Thanh =

Tân Thanh may refer to:

- Tân Thanh, Điện Biên, a ward of Điện Biên Phủ
- Tân Thanh, Bến Tre, a commune of Giồng Trôm District
- Tân Thanh, Bắc Giang, a commune of Lạng Giang District
- Tân Thanh, Lâm Đồng, a commune of Lâm Hà District
- Tân Thanh, Lạng Sơn, a commune of Văn Lãng District
- Tân Thanh, Tiền Giang, a commune of Cái Bè District

== See also ==
- Thanh Tân (disambiguation)
