= Paris by Night 86 =

PBN Talent Show - Semi-Finals
- Paris by Night episode
- Poster for PBN 86
- Episode no.: Episode 86
- Directed by: Michael Watt
- Masters of ceremonies: Nguyễn Cao Kỳ Duyên; Nguyễn Văn Thịnh; To Chan Phong
- Filmed at: Buena Park, California
- Filmed on: February 8, 2007
- Venue: Knott's Berry Farm
- Executive producers: Marie To; Paul Huynh
- Format: 2-Disc DVD
- Release date: April 12, 2007

Paris By Night 86: PBN Talent Show - Semi-Finals is a Paris By Night program produced by Thúy Nga that was filmed at Knott's Berry Farm in Buena Park, California on February 8, 2007.

This is the first Paris By Night's Talent Show. This Talent Show consists of Paris By Night 86 - Semifinal and Paris by Night 87 - Finals. There are 13 contestants in the semi-final.

== Track list ==
Disk 1

01. Opening: Ai Không Một Lần Mơ (What a Feeling) – Bằng Kiều, Minh Tuyết, Văn Phi Thông, David Meng, Huy Tâm, Ngọc Loan, Hương Giang, Triệu Bảo Vi, Quỳnh Vi, Sunny Lương, Mai Tiến Dũng, Trần Thái Hòa, Hoài Phương, Trịnh Lam, Ngô Quang Minh

02. Giới Thiệu Ban Giám Khảo – Khánh Ly, Hương Lan, Nhật Ngân, Đức Huy, Huỳnh Thi

03. Bên Giậu Cúc Tần (Hoàng Thành) - Văn Phi Thông, Thí Sinh #2

04. Xin Lỗi Em (Kasim) - David Meng, Thí Sinh #3

05. Ô Mê Ly (Văn Phụng) - Huy Tâm, Thí Sinh #4

06. Thương Nhớ Người Dưng (Nguyễn Nhất Huy) - Ngọc Loan, Thí Sinh #5

07. Về Ðây Nghe Em (Trần Quang Lộc) - Hương Giang, Thí Sinh #6

08. Rồi Cũng Chia Tay (Quốc An) - Triệu Bảo Vi, Thí Sinh #7

09. Về Ðây Em (Trịnh Nam Sơn) - Như Loan

10. Ngọc Lan (Dương Thiệu Tước) - Trần Thu Hà

11. Niềm Ðau Chôn Giấu (LV: Lữ Liên) - Quỳnh Vi, Thí Sinh #8

12. Hãy Nhìn Lại Mình Đi – Sunny Lương, Thí Sinh #9

13. Chuyện Chàng Cô Đơn – Mai Tiến Dũng, Thí Sinh #10

Disk 2

14. Tình Nhớ – Trần Thái Hòa, Thí Sinh #11

15. Chia Tay Tình Đầu – Hoài Phương, Thí Sinh #12

16. Tại Sao? (Trịnh Lam) - Trịnh Lam, Thí Sinh #13

17. Lá Ðổ Muôn Chiều (Đoàn Chuẩn, Từ Linh) - Ngô Quang Minh, Thí Sinh #14

18. Mình Ơi! (Diệu Hương) - Ý Lan

19. Bản Tình Cuối (Ngô Thụy Miên) - Bằng Kiều

20. Giờ Thì Anh Ðã Biết (Thái Thịnh) - Bằng Kiều, Minh Tuyết

21. Ai Khổ Vì Ai (Thương Linh) - Quỳnh Dung, Duy Trường

22. Hài kịch: Người Ở Thời Hiện Ðại - Kiều Oanh, Lê Tín, Trang Thanh Lan

23. Khoảng Cách (Quốc Dũng) - Trần Thái Hòa

24. Vầng Trăng Đêm Trôi – Minh Tuyết

25. Ai Không Một Lần Mơ (LV: Lê Xuân Trường) - 13 Thí Sinh

26. Closing: Ai Không Một Lần Mơ (What a Feeling) – Văn Phi Thông, David Meng, Huy Tâm, Ngọc Loan, Hương Giang, Triệu Bảo Vi, Quỳnh Vi, Sunny Lương, Mai Tiến Dũng, Trần Thái Hòa, Hoài Phương, Trịnh Lam, Ngô Quang Minh

Bonus: Red Carpet – Loan Châu, Minh Tuyết, Bằng Kiều, Trizzie Phương Trinh, Beckham, Như Loan, Huỳnh Gia Tuấn, Lynn, Công Thành, Phi Khanh, Lưu Bích, Khánh Hà, Khánh Ly, Tâm Đoan, Tiến Dũng, Thủy Tiên, Lương Tùng Quang, Vân Quỳnh, Roni Trong, Hương Lan, Ngọc Liên, Duy Trường, Quang Lê, Quỳnh Dung, Ngọc Ánh, Bé Xuân Mai, Bé Rich Anh Tuấn, Hồ Lệ Thu, Huy MC, Hoài Linh, Hương Thủy, Uyên Chi, Nguyền Hổng Nhung, Chi Tai, Phương Loan, Calvin Hiệp, Trúc Lam, Trúc Linh, Lynda Trang Đài, Tommy Ngô, Phi Nhung, Ý Lan, Thái Thanh, Huy Khiem, Phuong Hong Que, Ngọc Thúy, Huỳnh Nhật Tân, Henry Chúc, Rebecca Quỳnh Giao, Huy Vu, Tú Quyên, Thùy Vân, Tuan Hung, Vu Quang Minh

Preceded by Paris By Night 85: Xuân Trong Kỷ Niệm	Paris By Night; Paris By Night 86: PBN Talent Show - Semi-Finals	Succeeded by Paris By Night 87: PBN Talent Show - Finals
