= Lạng Giang =

- Ward
- Seal
- Interactive map of Lạng Giang
- Coordinates: 21°21′00″N 106°15′00″E
- Country: Vietnam
- Region: Red River Delta
- City: Bắc Ninh
- Established: 20 September 2026

Area
  - Total: 55.39 km^{2} (21.39 sq mi)

Population (2025)
  - Total: 64,714
  - Density: 1,168/km^{2} (3,030/sq mi)
- Website: langgiang.bacninh.gov.vn

Lạng Giang is a ward (phường) of Bắc Ninh city, in northeastern Vietnam. It is one of the 99 new wards, communes and special zones of the province following the reorganization in 2025.

== Geography ==
Lạng Giang ward is located in the north-central part of Bắc Ninh city. It borders the following administrative divisions:

- To the east, Bảo Đài commune.
- To the west, Mỹ Thái commune.
- To the south, Tân Dĩnh commune.
- To the north, Tiên Lục commune and Kép ward.

Lạng Giang ward covers an area of 55.39 km² and has a population of 64,714 people, giving a population density of approximately 1,168 people per km².

Lạng Giang ward serves as a developing urban and service center in the northern part of Bắc Ninh city. It lies at the intersection of several major transport routes, including National Route 1A, Provincial Road 295, and Provincial Road 293. The Hanoi–Đồng Đăng railway also passes through the ward.

== History ==
The Standing Committee of the National Assembly issued Resolution No. 1658/NQ-UBTVQH15 on the arrangement of commune-level administrative units in Bắc Ninh Province in 2025 (the resolution took effect on 16 June 2025). Accordingly, the entire natural area and population of Vôi township and the communes of Xương Lâm, Hương Lạc, and Tân Hưng were merged to form a new commune named Lạng Giang.

To accommodate rapid urbanization and facilitate coordinated infrastructure planning, on 4 August 2026, under the chairmanship of Chairman of the National Assembly Trần Thanh Mẫn, the Standing Committee of the National Assembly approved the establishment of new urban administrative units in Bắc Ninh province.

On 17 August 2026, Resolution No. 388/NQ-UBTVQH16 was officially promulgated and took effect on 20 September 2026. Under the resolution, Lạng Giang ward was established from the entire area and population of Lạng Giang commune.

On 24 August 2026, the National Assembly promulgated Resolution No. 39/2026/QH16 on the establishment of Bắc Ninh city from the entire area and population of Bắc Ninh province. The resolution took effect on 20 September 2026. Consequently, Lạng Giang ward became part of Bắc Ninh city.
