= Lạng Giang district =

Coordinates: 21.367°N 106.250°E

Lạng Giang district Huyện Lạng Giang
- District
- Seal
- Interactive map of Lạng Giang district
- Country: Vietnam
- Province: Bắc Giang
- Capital: Vôi

Government
  - Party Secretary: Tạ Huy Cần
  - People's Council Chairman: Nguyễn Văn Nghĩa
  - People's Committee Chairman: Tạ Huy Cần

Area
  - Total: 95 sq mi (246 km^{2})

Population
  - Total: 216,996
- 2019
- Time zone: UTC+7 (Indochina Time)

Lạng Giang is a former rural district of Bắc Giang province in the Northeast region of Vietnam. As of 2019 the district had a population of 216,996. The district covers an area of 246 km^{2}. The district capital lies at Vôi.

== Administrative divisions ==
The district is split administratively into the townships of Vôi, Kép and the rural communes of: Thái Đào, Đại Lâm, Tân Dĩnh, Xương Lâm, Tân Hưng, Hương Sơn, Xuân Hương, Mỹ Thái, Tân Thanh, Mỹ Hà, Tiên Lục, Đào Mỹ, An Hà, Hương Lạc, Nghĩa Hưng, Nghĩa Hòa, Quang Thịnh, Dương Đức and Yên Mỹ.
