= Thanh Tân =

Thanh Tân or Thanh Tan can refer some populated places in Vietnam as

- Thanh Tân, Thái Bình, a commune in Kiến Xương District
- Thanh Tân, Bến Tre, a commune in Mỏ Cày Bắc District
- Thanh Tân, Thanh Hóa, a commune in Như Thanh District
- Thanh Tân, Hà Nam, a commune in Thanh Liêm District

== Thạnh Tân ==
- Thạnh Tân, Tiền Giang, a commune in Tân Phước District
- Thạnh Tân, Tây Ninh, a commune in Tây Ninh city
- Thạnh Tân, Sóc Trăng, a commune in Thạnh Trị District

== Thành Tân ==
- Thành Tân, a commune in Thạch Thành District, Thanh Hóa Province

== See also ==
- Tân Thanh (disambiguation)
