= Chí Tài =

Vietnamese comedian, musician, and singer (1958–2020)

Nguyễn Chí Tài
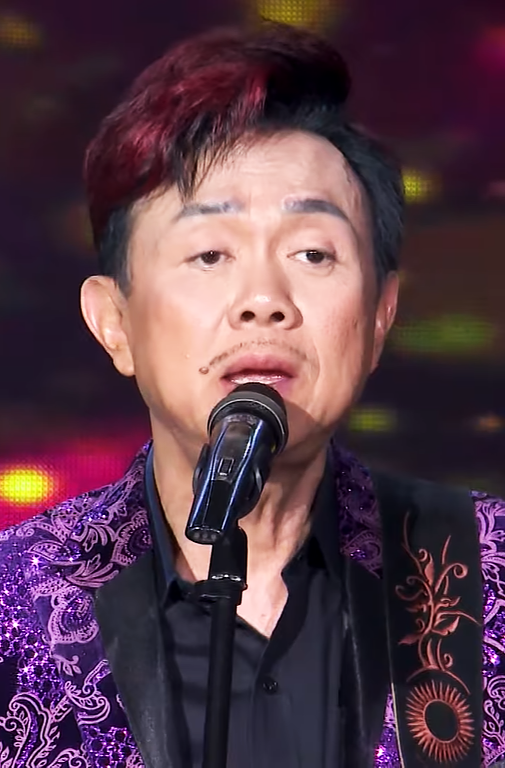
- Chí Tài in 2020
- Born: Nguyễn Chí Tài; August 15, 1958; Phú Nhuận, Tân Bình District, Gia Định, South Vietnam
- Died: December 9, 2020 (aged 62); Phú Nhuận District, Ho Chi Minh City, Vietnam
- Burial place: Holy Sepulcher Cemetery, Orange, California
- Occupations: Artist, comedian, singer
- Years active: 1976–2020
- Spouse: Phương Loan (m. 1987)

Nguyễn Chí Tài (August 15, 1958 – December 9, 2020), commonly known as Chí Tài, was a Vietnamese comedian, musician, and singer. Initially starting as a singer in the 90s, he later became a comedian celebrity when he participated in several comedy acts alongside his well-known stage partner Hoài Linh.

== Biography ==
From 1976 to 1977, Chí Tài co-founded Lướt Sóng band. He played as a guitarist during the Ca khúc chính trị (Political Songs) movement of the Youth Union in Phú Nhuận District, Ho Chi Minh City.

In 1981, Chí Tài migrated to the United States. He intended to lead a new life in the US by studying English and computers, as well as taking a break from his musician career. However, he still kept his passion toward music despite his family's objections. Later, Chí Tài take a local piano class and a jazz class. His father withdrew part of his pension to buy for Chí Tài an electronic audio system, including a drum set as well as other musical instruments, so he could form a young band. He formed the family band "Chi Tai's Brothers". During the early start, Chi Tai's Brothers received requests to perform at weddings and community events.

The band stayed active in Thúy Nga productions since Paris By Night 18 (Chí Tài collaborated with Thúy Nga since Paris By Night 15 as a music arranger).

Chí Tài later opened a mixing and mastering studio for Vietnamese overseas singers, apart from musical records, other notable works such as Nguyễn Ngọc Ngạn's horror stories collection, soundtrack for many Paris By Night's comedy acts. A lot of soundtrack were all composed by Chí Tài himself. He adopted a bright and cheerful tone so tracks were really catchy. This made Chí Tài one of the leading Vietnamese music arrangers overseas at that time.

In 1997, Chí Tài had a chance to perform with Hoài Linh due to lack of performers.

At the time I got separated from Vân Sơn, 2 impresario's at California suggested collaborating with Chí Tài. From my perspective, his quiet style suited my loud style so I agreed. This collaboration skyrocketed our career. I appreciated that period of time because our interest never conflict even once. (translation)

— Hoài Linh

In 2000, Chí Tài switched to comedy. He regularly appeared in various shows of Paris By Night – along with Quang Minh and Hồng Đào, Trang Thanh Lan, Kiều Linh, Uyên Chi, Kiều Oanh, Lê Tín, Hoài Linh, Thúy Nga, Hoài Tâm, Việt Hương, Hương Thủy, Bé Tí…

== Liveshow ==
=== Liveshow Chí Tài – Những Chuyện Tình Nghiệt Ngã 1 (2017) ===
- Chuyện tình 1 (Chí Tài, Trường Giang, Hứa Minh Đạt, Lâm Vỹ Dạ, Thanh Tân, Tố My, Tóc Tiên);
- Chuyện tình 2 (Chí Tài, Trấn Thành, Tiến Luật, Thu Trang, Quách Ngọc Tuyên, Hoài Lâm);
- Chuyện tình 3 (Chí Tài, Hoài Linh, Trường Giang, Cát Phượng, Long Đẹp Trai, Nam Thư, Hồng Thanh).

=== Liveshow Chí Tài – Những Chuyện Tình Nghiệt Ngã 2 (2019) ===
- Part 1: Cô Bé Áo Dài – Written by: Chí Tài – Performed by: Chí Tài, Thúy Ngân and Vũ Đoàn NK;
- Part 2: Chuyện Tình 1 (Chí Tài, Hoài Linh, Trường Giang, Lâm Vỹ Dạ, Quách Ngọc Tuyên, Thúy Ngân, Lê Khâm);
- Part 3: Chuyện Tình 2 (Chí Tài, Hoài Linh, Trấn Thành, Lê Giang, Tiến Luật, Khả Như, HH Trần Ngọc Châu);
- Part 4: Ca khúc Yêu – Written by: Nhật Trường – Performed by: Chí Tài, Phương Loan and Vũ Đoàn NK.

== Plays ==
- Người nhà quê
- Cổ tích một tình yêu
- Dâu đất khách
- Osin là ông nội
- Tuyển vợ (Môi Tím)
- Bên cầu dệt lụa (Liveshow Ái Xuân)
- Quái xế (Liveshow Chí Tài Comedian 2008)
- Dân chơi hàng mướn (Liveshow Chí Tài Comedian 2008)
- Ai Câm (Liveshow Chí Tài Comedian 2008)
- Đánh Ghen (Liveshow Hoài Linh Ru Lại Câu Hò)
- Đèo Gió Hú (Liveshow Hoài Linh Bí Mật Bật Mí Bị Mất)
- Bầy vịt cái (Liveshow Hoài Linh Những Tên Cướp Biển Vùng Caribê)
- Rượu (Liveshow Hoài Linh Kung-Fu)
- Nỗi đau đất dày (Liveshow Hoài Linh Kỳ Án)
- Đêm kinh hoàng (Liveshow Thúy Nga Xin Lỗi, Em Chỉ Là Con Quỷ)
- Cuộc thi các đệ nhất (Hài tết 2010 VCD Chuyện đời)
- Tân Ngao Sò Ốc Hến (Liveshow Bảo Quốc 50 năm vui cười cùng sân khấu)

== Gameshow/Talkshow ==
- Ơn giời cậu đây rồi! – VTV3 (2014–2015)
- Bí mật đêm Chủ Nhật – HTV7 (2015)
- Tôi là người chiến thắng – HTV7 (2015)
- Người bí ẩn (2015, 2019)
- Gương mặt thân quen (2017)
- Ký ức vui vẻ – VTV3 (2019)
- Giọng ải giọng ai – HTV7 (2019)

== Personal life ==
In 1987, Chí Tài married singer Phương Loan. The couple agreed not to have children so that he would be able to focus on his career. During an interview in 2019, he said that he couldn't help but regret because he didn't have a child to follow his footsteps.

== Death ==
On December 9, 2020, at Phú Nhuận, Ho Chi Minh City, Chí Tài died in hospital from a stroke. He was found paralyzed on 7th floor's staircase at Botanic apartment. Although an ambulance was immediately dispatched to take him to a hospital, Chí Tài didn't survive. Previously, Chí Tài was diagnosed with diabetes and high cholesterol..

Phương Loan – Chí Tài's wife – wanted to bring her husband back to the US for burial. Hoài Linh – Chí Tài's colleague and close friend, who had stayed with him in the last minutes – was authorized by his family to look after this matter. Visitation ceremony was held at the Ministry of Defense Funeral Home No. 5 Pham Ngu Lao Street, Ward 3, Go Vap District, Ho Chi Minh City on December 12 – in accordance with Catholic rites. A large crowd of Vietnamese artists and thousands of fans were present. In the same afternoon, the coffin was brought to Tân Sơn Nhất airport to be brought back to the US according to the family's wishes. There, he was cremated at Peek Funeral Home, later inurned at Holy Sepulcher Cemetery in California.
