= Lý Nhã Kỳ =

Vietnamese actress

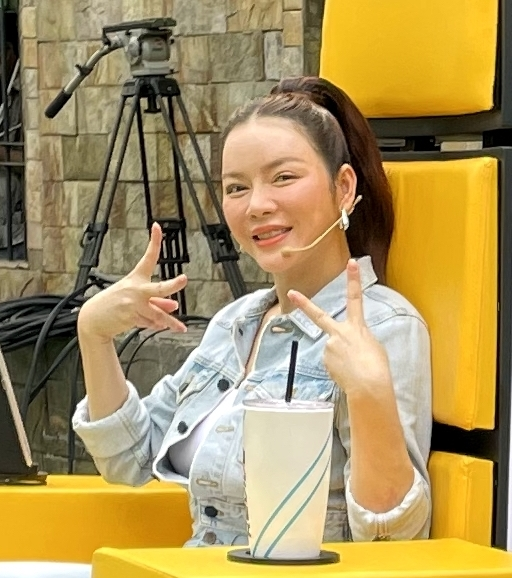
- Born: Trần Thị Thanh Nhàn; Vũng Tàu, Bà Rịa–Vũng Tàu province, Vietnam
- Occupations: Actress, model, businesswoman
- Years active: 2005–

Trần Thị Thanh Nhàn, also known as Lý Nhã Kỳ,is a Vietnamese actress, model and businesswoman. She is known for portraying Diễm Kiều in HTV's series produced by Vietnam Feature film Studio Kiều nữ và đại gia (The Beauty and the Wealthy). Since 2011, she has been serving as the Tourism ambassador of Vietnam.

She stated that "Lý" was taken from her father's name (who has passed away), 'Nhã' comes from her name "Nhàn" in Nhàn Nhã (meaning gentle and refined), and "Kỳ", means something strange and unexpectedly, was chosen by her as she believes that her life sometimes brings unexpected things.

== Filmography ==
=== Acting credits ===
Title	Year	Role	Note
Tình yêu còn mãi / Love Prevails	2006	Trúc	
Chuyện tình yêu / Love Story	2007	Hoài Thu	
Ghen / Jealousy	2007	Ngọc Hoàn	
Giá mua một thượng đế / Prize To Buy A God	2007	Thạch Thảo	
Thám tử tư / The Private Invesgator	2007		
Mười	2007	Young lady	
Kiều nữ và đại gia / The Beauty and The Wealthy	2008	Diễm Kiều	First air on HTV
Bước chân hoàn vũ	2009	Thụy Khuê	Television series
Gió nghịch mùa / Wind From Different Season	2009	Khánh Ngọc	
Nơi tình yêu bắt đầu / The Place Where Love Begins	2009	Unknown	Canceled
Shanghai	2010	Model	
Vàng trong cát / Mining Gold From Sand	2011		Producer
Đại tướng Võ Nguyên Giáp và bản giao hưởng Điện Biên / General Võ Nguyên Giáp and the Điện Biên Symphony	2011	Julie	Play
Chiếc giường chia đôi / The Divided Bed	2011	Mỹ Anh	
Cold summer	2012	Hoa	
E-Book	2018		Film investor
Angel Face	2018		Film investor
Kẻ Thứ Ba	2019	Thiên Di	Producer; co-starring with Han Jae-suk

=== Television appearance ===
Title	Year	Role	Note
Odd One In Vietnam Season 1	2014	Guest	Ep. 1
Odd One In Vietnam Season 3	2016	Guest	Ep. 1
Get Your Act Together Vietnam	2016	Judge	Ep. 1
Dance Your Ass Off Vietnam	2016	Judge	Ep. 2
Ảo Thuật Siêu Phàm	2018	Judge	All episodes
Ô Hay Gì Thế Này	2019	Guest	Ep. 4
7 Nụ Cười Xuân Mùa 4	2019	Guest	Ep. 3
Ơn Giời! Cậu Đây Rồi Season 7	2019	Guest	Ep. 1
Sao Hoả Sao Kim	2019	Guest	Ep. 9
Top Chef Vietnam (Đầu bếp thượng đỉnh)	2019	Judge	Ep. 2
Bếp Vui Bùng Vị	2019	Guest	Ep. 13
Khuôn Mặt Đàng Tin	2019	Guest	Ep. 1
Gõ Cửa Thăm Nhà	2020	Guest	Ep. 33
Lightning Quiz Vietnam Season 3	2020	Guest	Ep. 5, 12, 14
Siêu Bất Ngờ Season 5	2020	Guest	Ep. 2
Lightning Quiz Vietnam	2020	Guest	Ep. 5
Lightning Quiz Kids Vietnam	2020	Guest	Ep. 16
Đánh Thức Đam Mê	2020	Judge	All episodes
Chị Em Chúng Mình	2020	Guest	Ep. 1
Cơ Hội Đến	2020	Mentor	Ep. 4
Chọn Ai Đây Mùa 2	2021	Mentor	Ep. 1, 2, 3, 4
Giác Quan Thứ 6 Season 3	2021	Guest	Ep. 9
Siêu Thử Thách	2021	Guest judge	Ep. 6, 10
6 Ô Cửa Bí Ẩn	2021	Guest	Ep. 7
Hát Mãi Ước Mơ Season 4	2021	Judge	All episodes
Who is Single Vietnam Season 4	2022	Main character	Ep. 13

=== Contests and other shows ===
Title	Year	Role
2017	Miss Grand International 2017	Judge
2017	Mister Fitness Supermodel Vietnam	Judge
2019	Miss and Mister Asia Business 2019	Judge
2020	Xuân Phát Tài	MC
2022	Miss Tourism ASEAN+	Judge
2022	Miss Ocean Vietnam	Judge

== Endorsement ==
- Mercedes-Benz
- Avon Products
