= Cam Ranh (city) =

Cam Ranh City Thành phố Cam Ranh Cẩm Lăng phong / Núi Cấm
- Provincial city (Class-III)
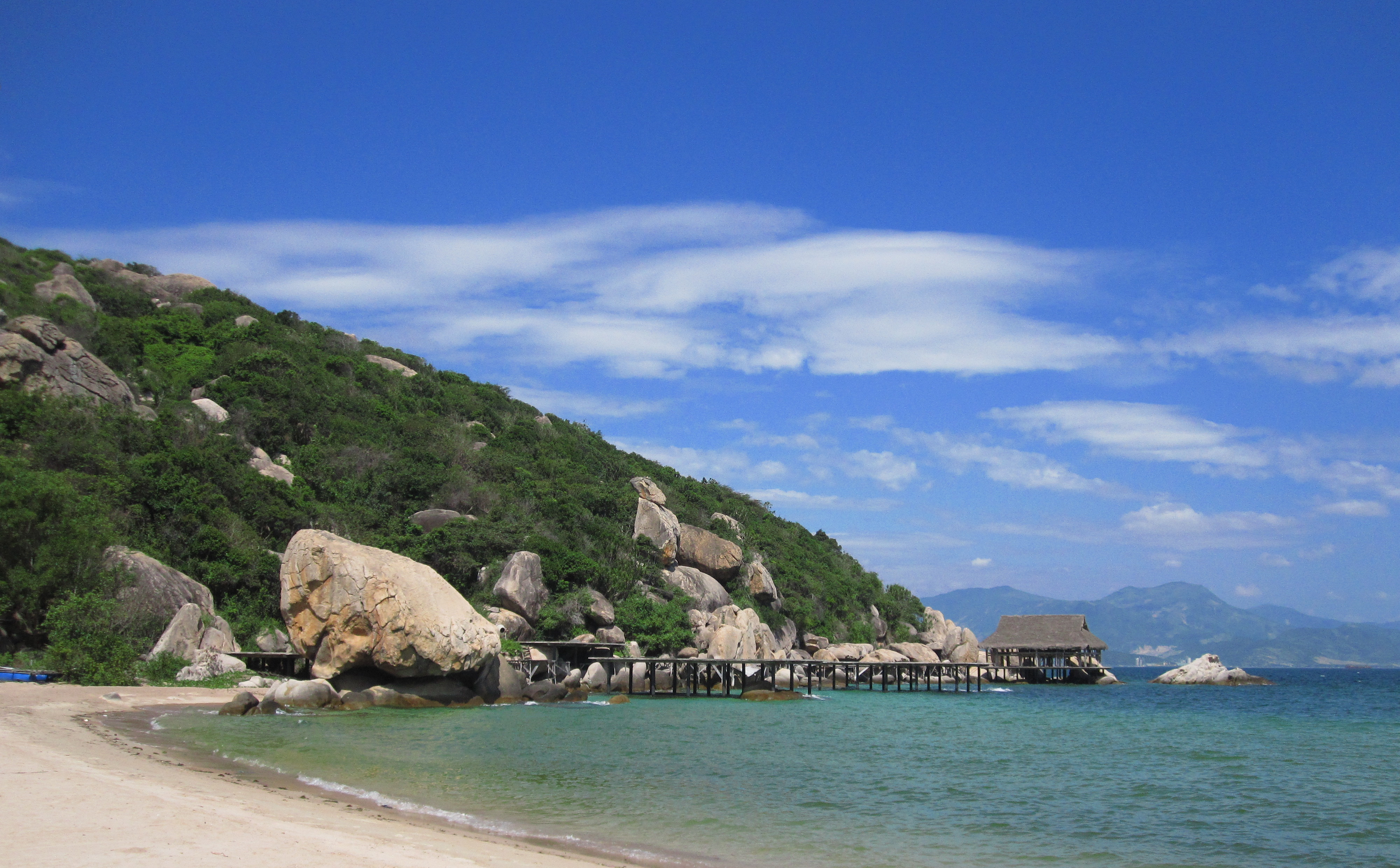
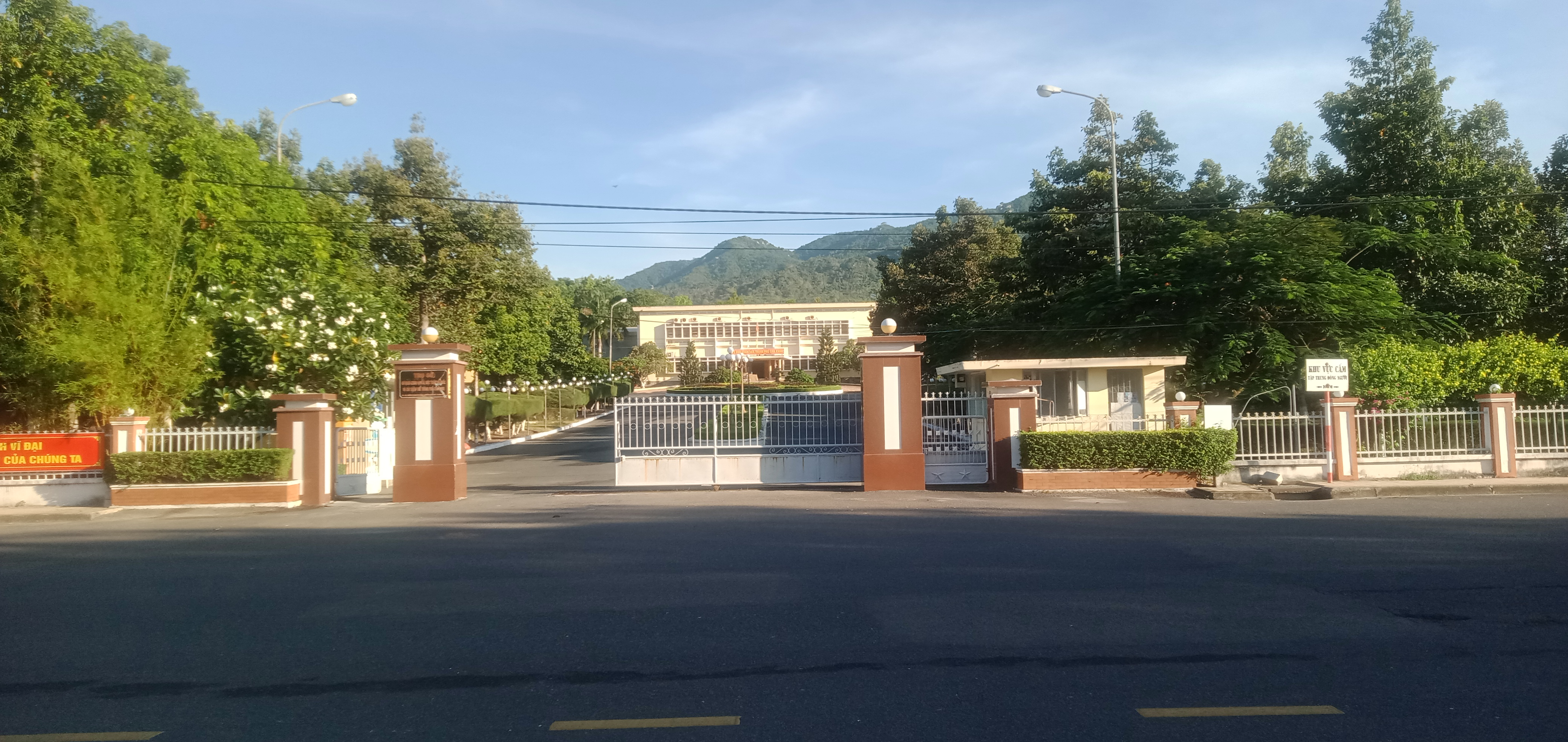
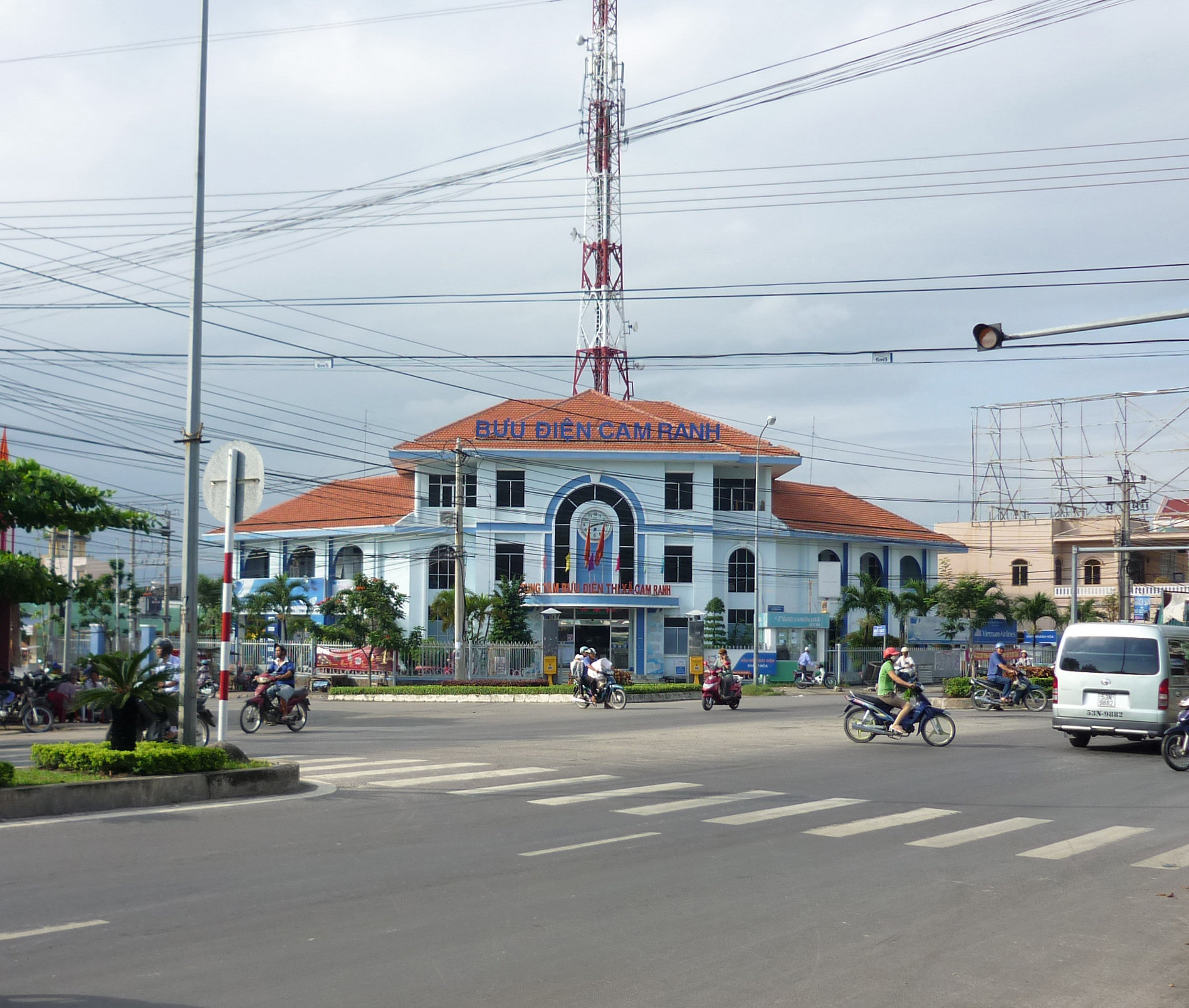
- Cam Ranh beach view from Ngọc Sương Cam Ranh resort. Cam Ranh City Hall Cam Ranh Post Office

- Seal
- Interactive map of Cam Ranh City
- Location of in Vietnam Cam Ranh City (Southeast Asia) Cam Ranh City (Asia)
- Coordinates: 11°54′49″N 109°8′13″E
- Country: Vietnam
- Province: Khánh Hòa
- Establishment: July 7, 2000 as Cam Ranh town; December 23, 2010 as Cam Ranh city
- Central hall: Administrative Inter-agency Area No. 2, Phạm Văn Đồng Street, Cam Phú, Cam Ranh

Government
  - Type: Municipality

Area
  - Total: 316 km^{2} (122 sq mi)

Population (2019)
  - Total: 138,510
  - Density: 438/km^{2} (1,130/sq mi)
  - Ethnicities: Kinh; Tanka; Champa
- Time zone: UTC+7 (Indochina Time)
- ZIP code: 654700
- Climate: As
- Website: Camranh.Khanhhoa.gov.vn; Camranh.Khanhhoa.dcs.vn

Cam Ranh is a port-city in Southern Khánh Hòa Province, in the South Central Coast region of Vietnam.

== History ==
Cam Ranh, known in the ancient Rade (Êđê) language as Kăm Mran, is a land closely associated with the development of the Champa culture. Since ancient times, Cam Ranh has been an important military and economic location of the Champa kingdom. During this period, Cam Ranh was a bustling commercial center, with many merchants from neighboring countries coming to trade. The land of Cam Ranh was also home to many ethnic minorities, primarily Cham, Rade (Êđê), and Raglai people.

In 1939, the French colonial government established the Ba Ngòi Administrative Agency, which was subordinate to the Khánh Hòa province. This agency included parts of the Vĩnh Xương and Ninh Thuận districts. During this period, Cam Ranh was built by the French into an important military base, with many fortifications being built, including Cam Ranh Airport.

After 1954, Cam Ranh became a part of the Khánh Hòa province, South Vietnam. The South Vietnam government continued to develop Cam Ranh into an important military base, with many new facilities being built, including Cam Ranh Military Station.

In the Vietnam War, Cam Ranh was a major military stronghold of the United States and the South Vietnamese government. The US military built Cam Ranh Air Base into a major military base, with many fortifications being built.

After 1975, Cam Ranh district was became Cam Ranh town, which is subordinate to the Khánh Hòa province. On December 23, 2010, the Government issued Resolution 65/NQ-CP to establish the city of Cam Ranh based on the entire area and population of Cam Ranh town.

== Geography ==
It is the second-largest city in the province, after Nha Trang. It is located on Cam Ranh Bay. As of 2024 the city had a population of 134,100 and covered an area of 316 km^{2}.

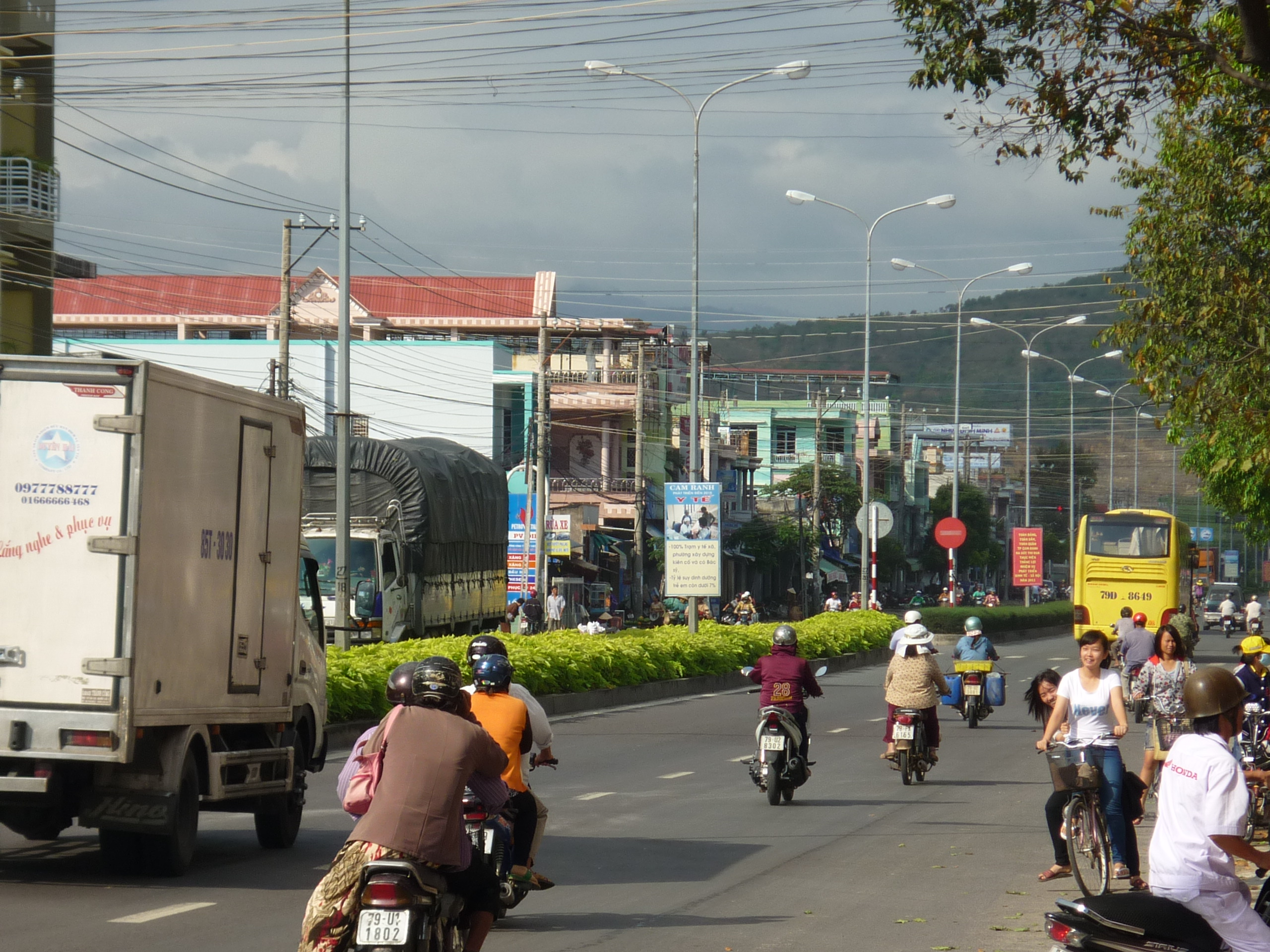
Street in Cam Ranh

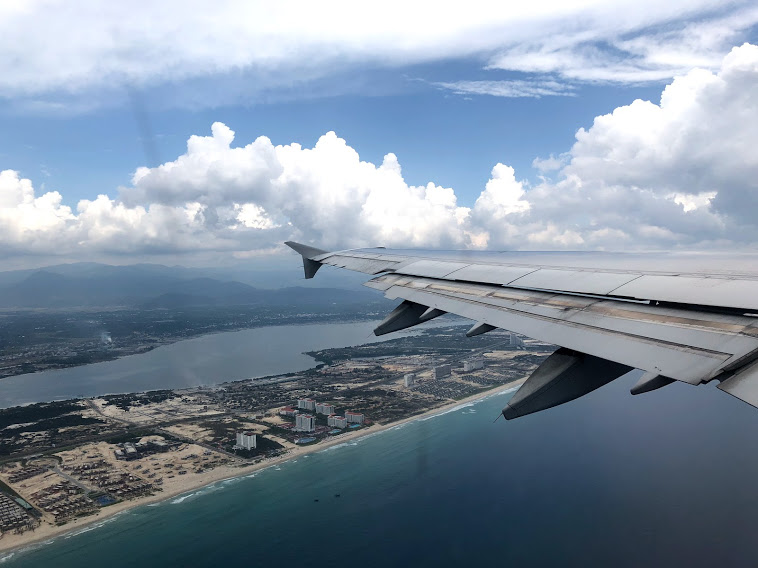
Cam Ranh aerial view

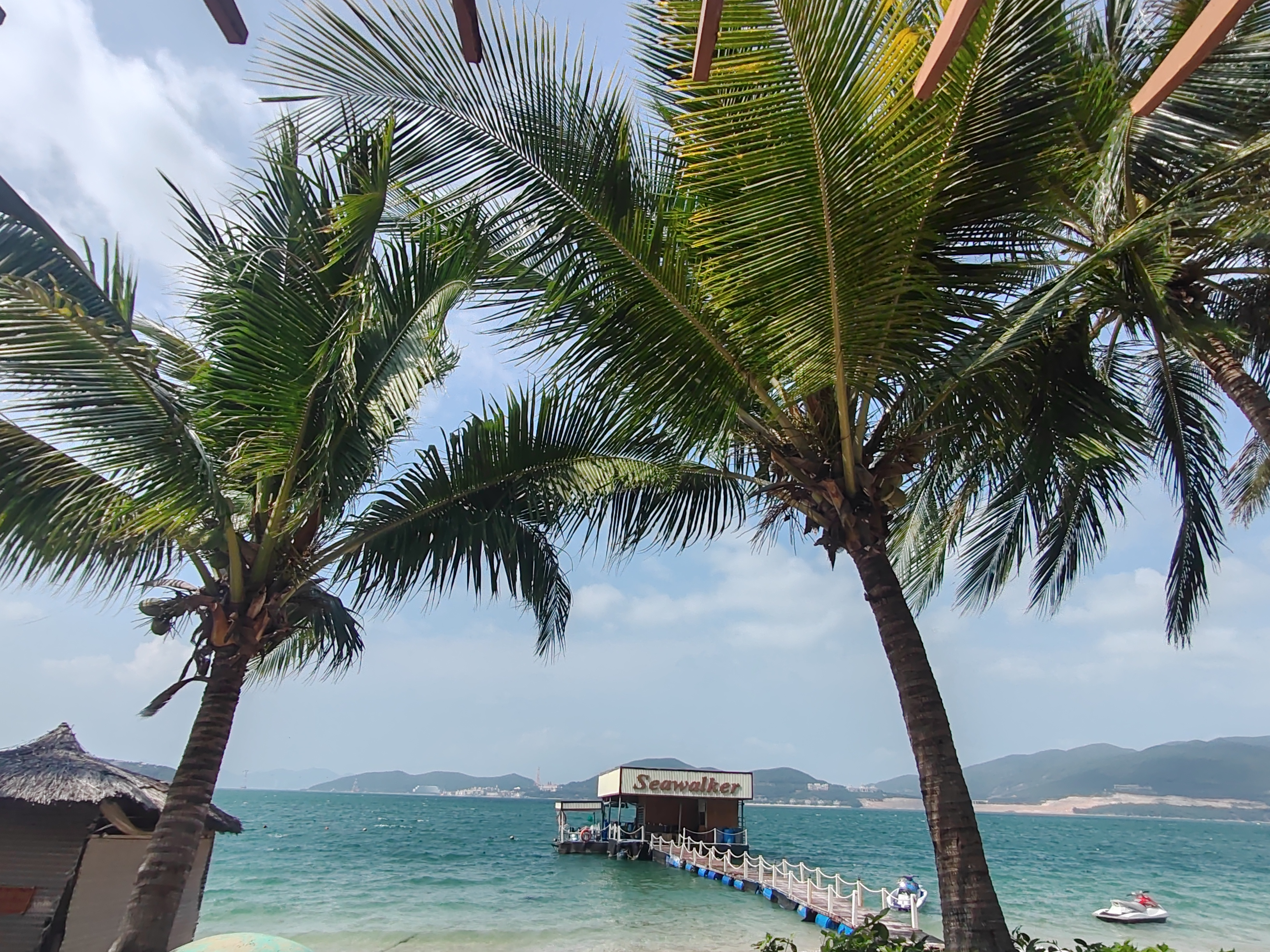
Coast near Cam Ranh International Airport

== Infrastructure ==
- Cam Ranh International Airport
- Ba Ngòi Port

== Climate ==
Cam Ranh has a tropical savanna climate (Köppen climate classification: Aw).

Climate data for Cam Ranh
Month	Jan	Feb	Mar	Apr	May	Jun	Jul	Aug	Sep	Oct	Nov	Dec	Year
Record high °C (°F)	33.3 (91.9)	33.0 (91.4)	34.5 (94.1)	37.1 (98.8)	39.2 (102.6)	38.7 (101.7)	40.4 (104.7)	40.4 (104.7)	38.5 (101.3)	37.8 (100.0)	33.5 (92.3)	32.5 (90.5)	40.4 (104.7)
Mean daily maximum °C (°F)	28.3 (82.9)	29.6 (85.3)	31.0 (87.8)	32.4 (90.3)	33.4 (92.1)	33.5 (92.3)	33.4 (92.1)	33.7 (92.7)	32.4 (90.3)	30.6 (87.1)	29.2 (84.6)	28.0 (82.4)	31.3 (88.3)
Daily mean °C (°F)	24.5 (76.1)	25.1 (77.2)	26.4 (79.5)	28.1 (82.6)	29.0 (84.2)	29.1 (84.4)	28.8 (83.8)	28.9 (84.0)	28.0 (82.4)	26.8 (80.2)	26.0 (78.8)	24.9 (76.8)	27.2 (81.0)
Mean daily minimum °C (°F)	21.9 (71.4)	22.1 (71.8)	23.3 (73.9)	24.8 (76.6)	25.7 (78.3)	25.8 (78.4)	25.5 (77.9)	25.6 (78.1)	24.9 (76.8)	24.2 (75.6)	23.6 (74.5)	22.7 (72.9)	24.2 (75.6)
Record low °C (°F)	14.4 (57.9)	16.4 (61.5)	17.1 (62.8)	18.6 (65.5)	21.5 (70.7)	21.1 (70.0)	21.3 (70.3)	21.0 (69.8)	21.6 (70.9)	19.3 (66.7)	18.7 (65.7)	15.7 (60.3)	14.4 (57.9)
Average rainfall mm (inches)	24.4 (0.96)	10.0 (0.39)	38.0 (1.50)	35.3 (1.39)	89.4 (3.52)	68.2 (2.69)	53.9 (2.12)	56.2 (2.21)	167.1 (6.58)	248.8 (9.80)	319.6 (12.58)	164.9 (6.49)	1,324.5 (52.15)
Average rainy days	5.6	2.6	3.1	4.0	8.9	8.5	8.6	9.1	13.5	15.8	14.8	11.6	105.9
Average relative humidity (%)	74.5	75.0	76.1	76.4	75.7	74.1	73.6	73.9	78.7	80.8	79.1	75.6	76.1
Mean monthly sunshine hours	214.7	237.0	272.0	266.4	255.5	224.0	234.6	230.9	199.0	182.5	169.5	164.7	2,640.9
Source: Vietnam Institute for Building Science and Technology, Nchmf.gov.vn (July record high)

== Gallery ==
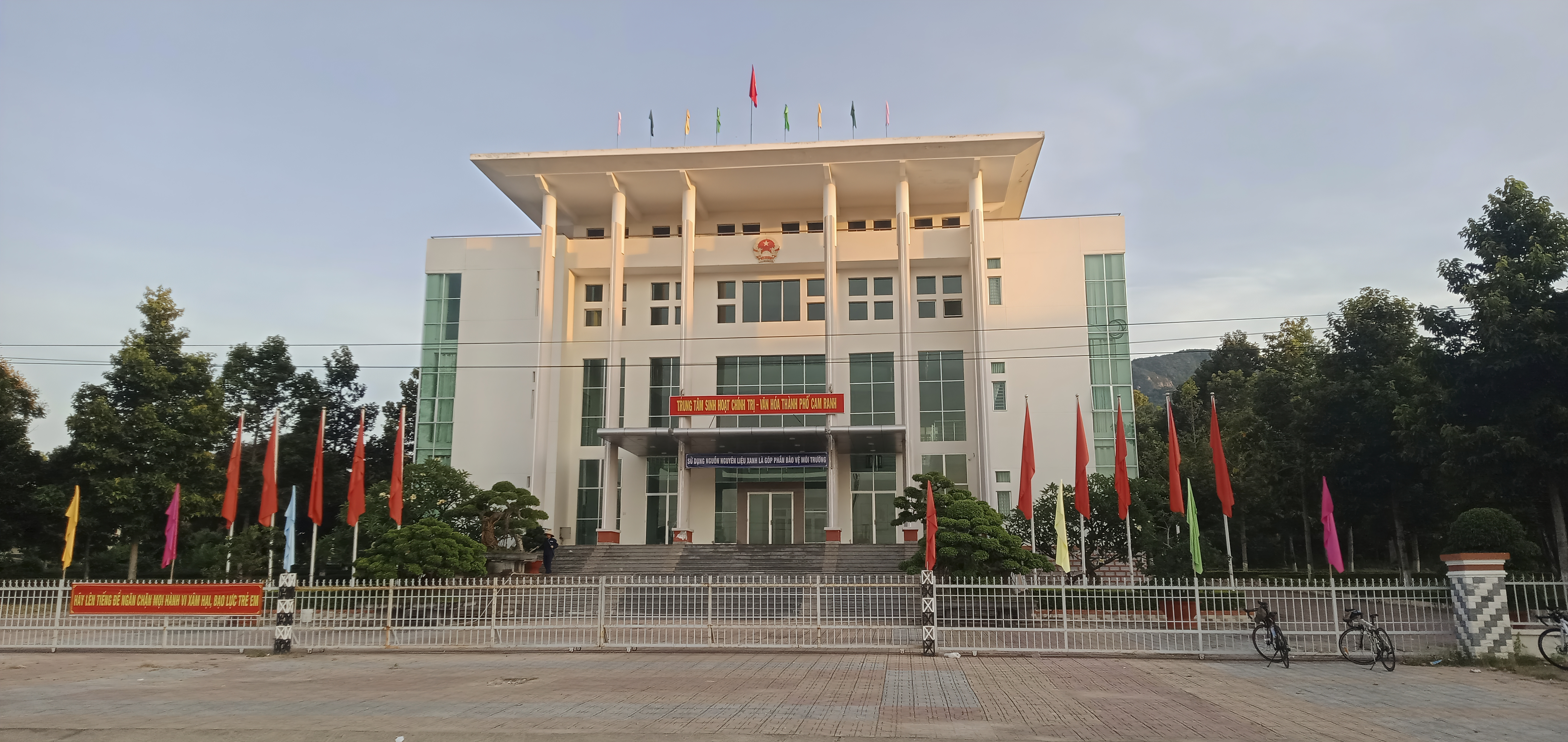
City Center for Political and Cultural Activities

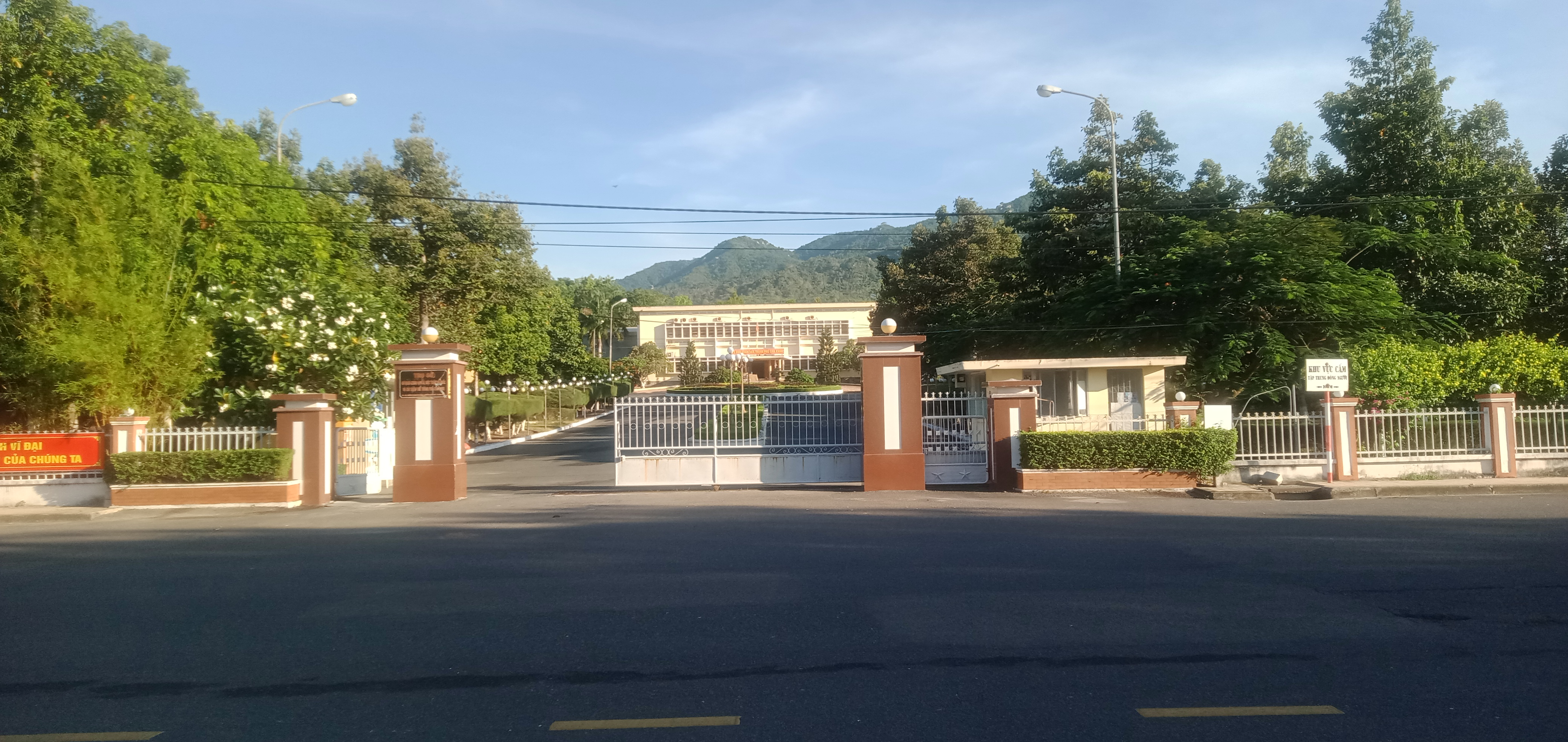
Headquarters of Cam Ranh City People's Committee

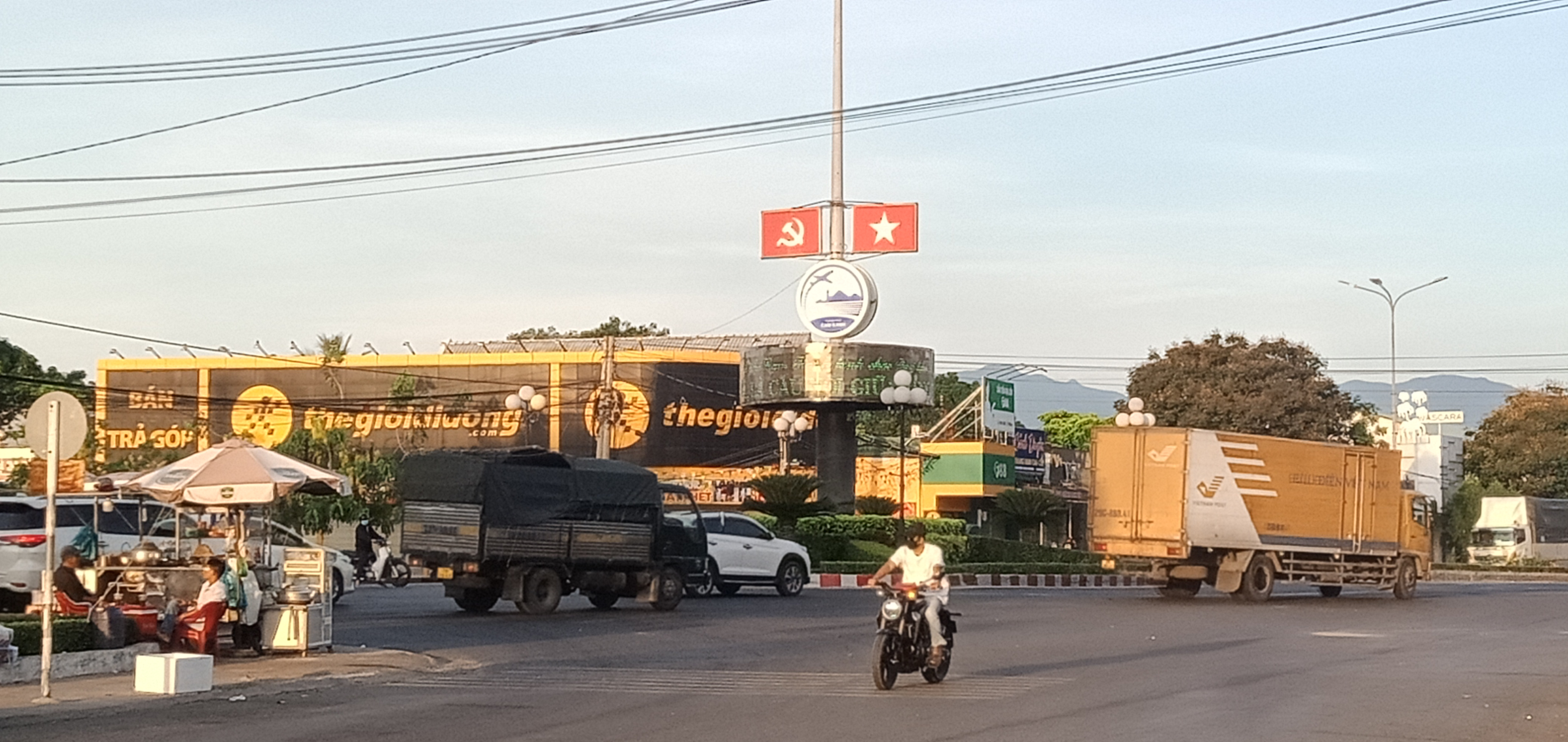
Roundabout at the intersection of Hùng Vương Avenue and August 22 Street

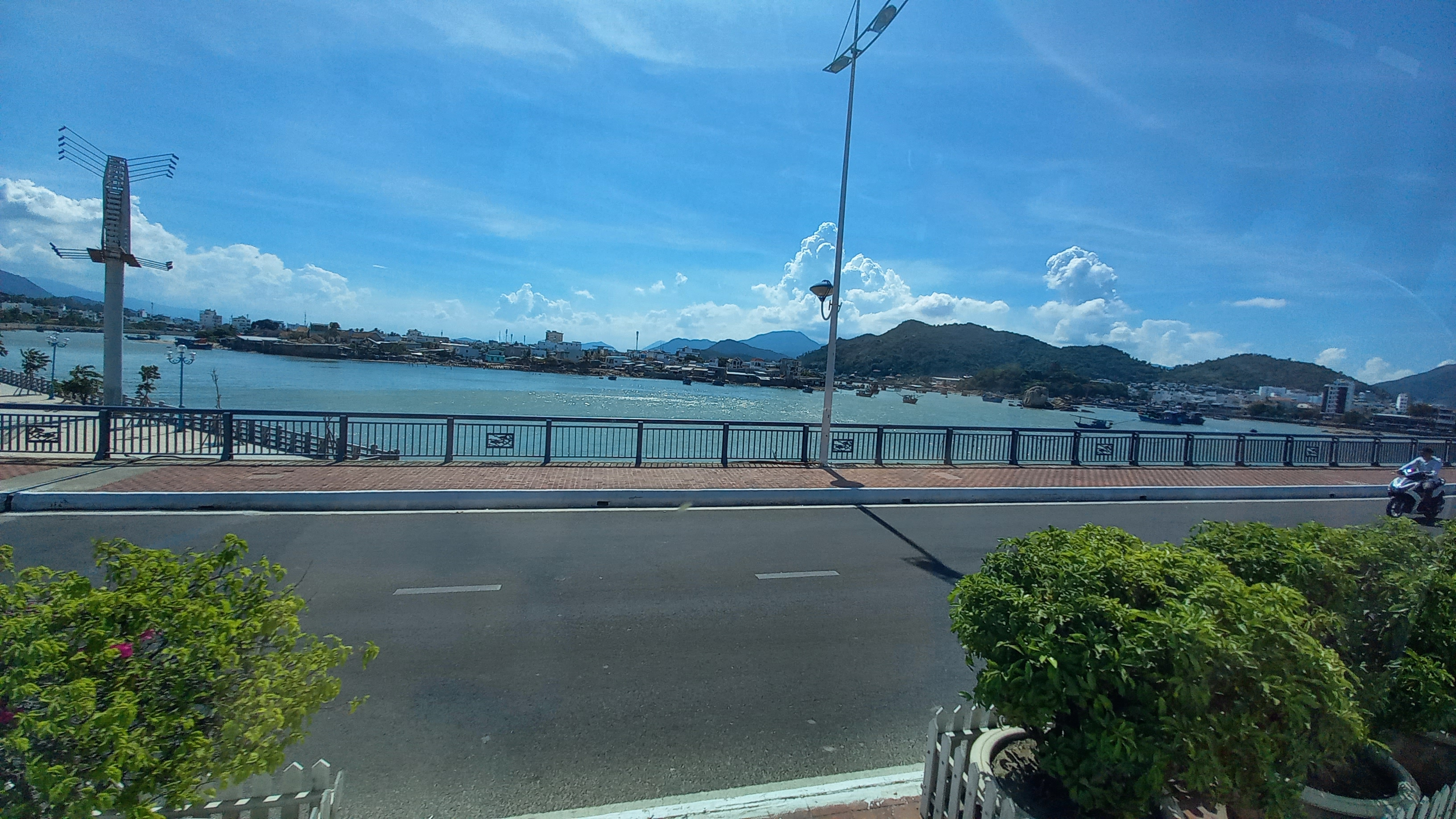
Cam Ranh beach view from street

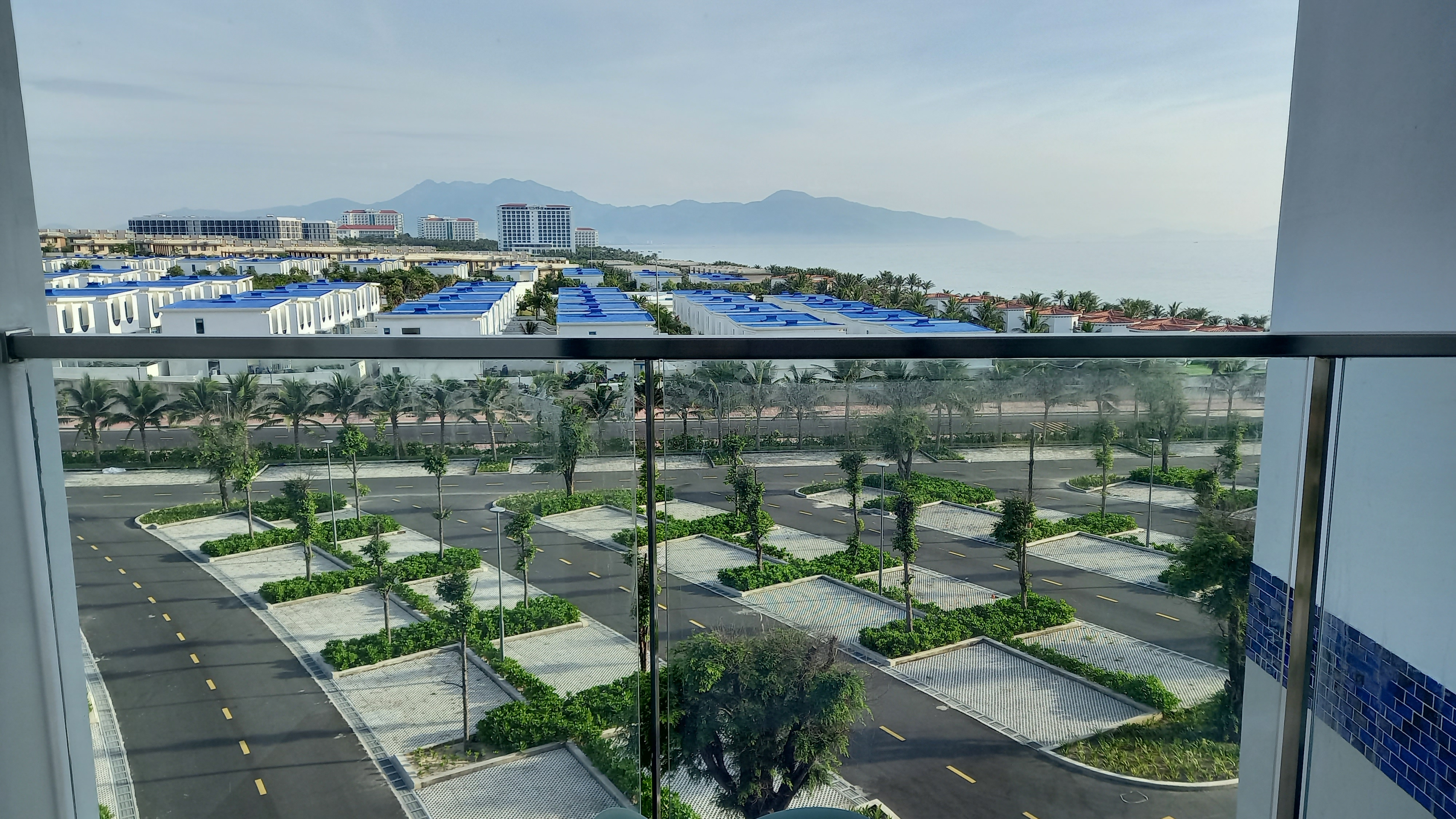
A resort in Cam Ranh

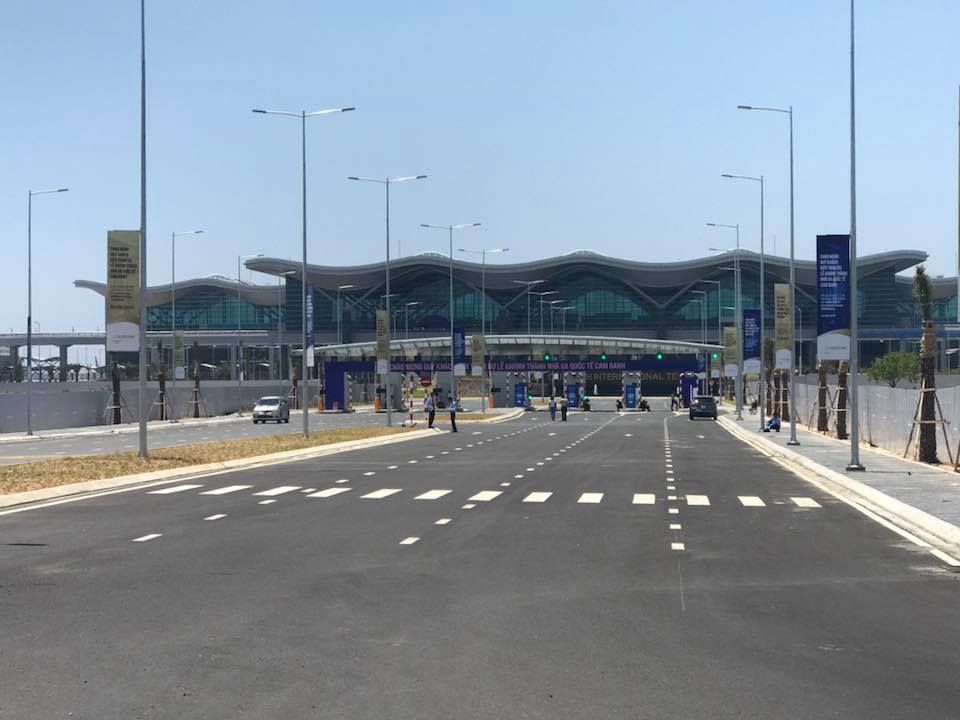
Cam Ranh International Airport
