= Đại Lộc district =

Coordinates: 15°53′29″N 108°07′05″E

Đại Lộc district Huyện Đại Lộc
- District
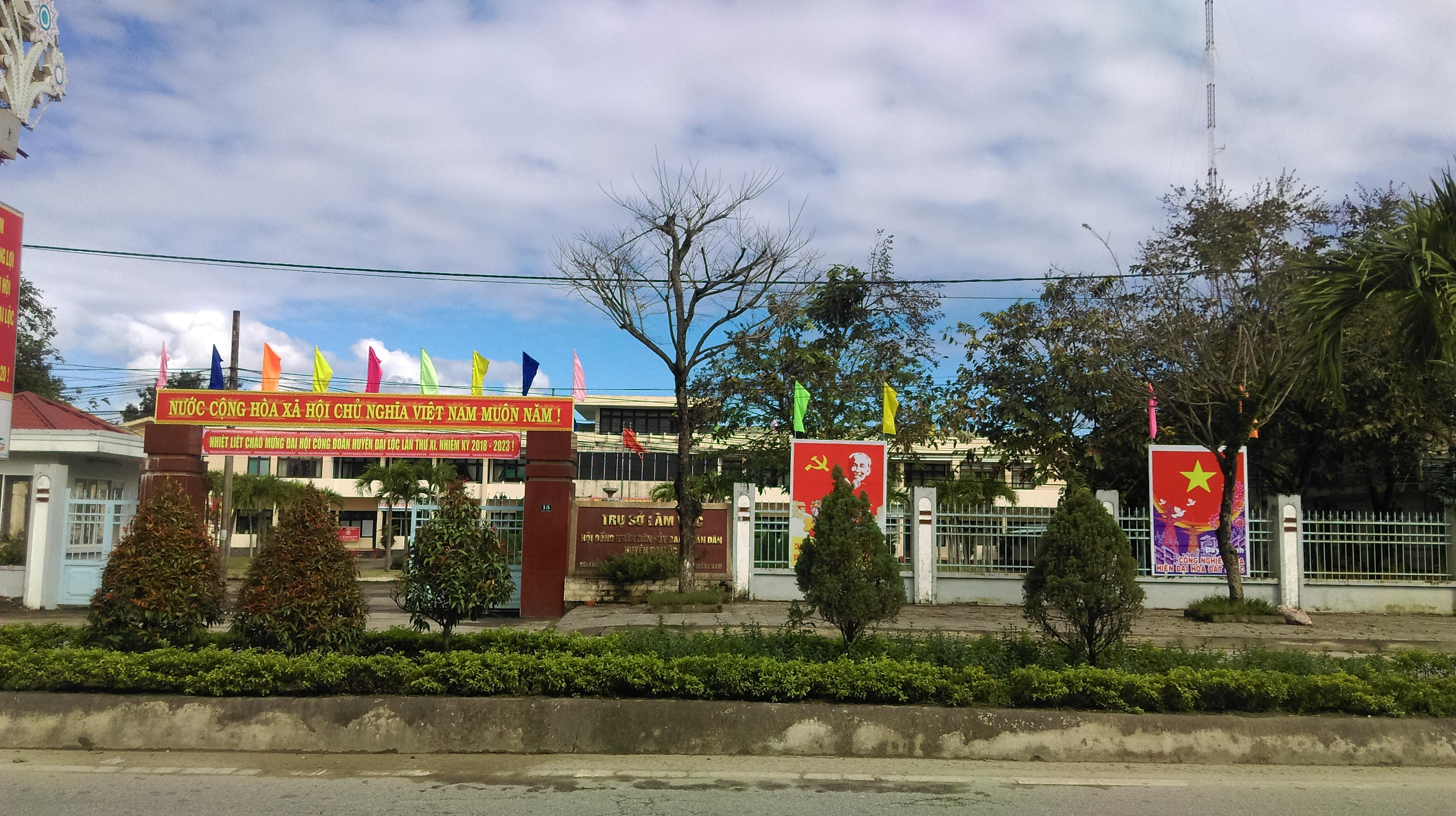
- People's Committee of Đại Lộc district, Quang Nam.

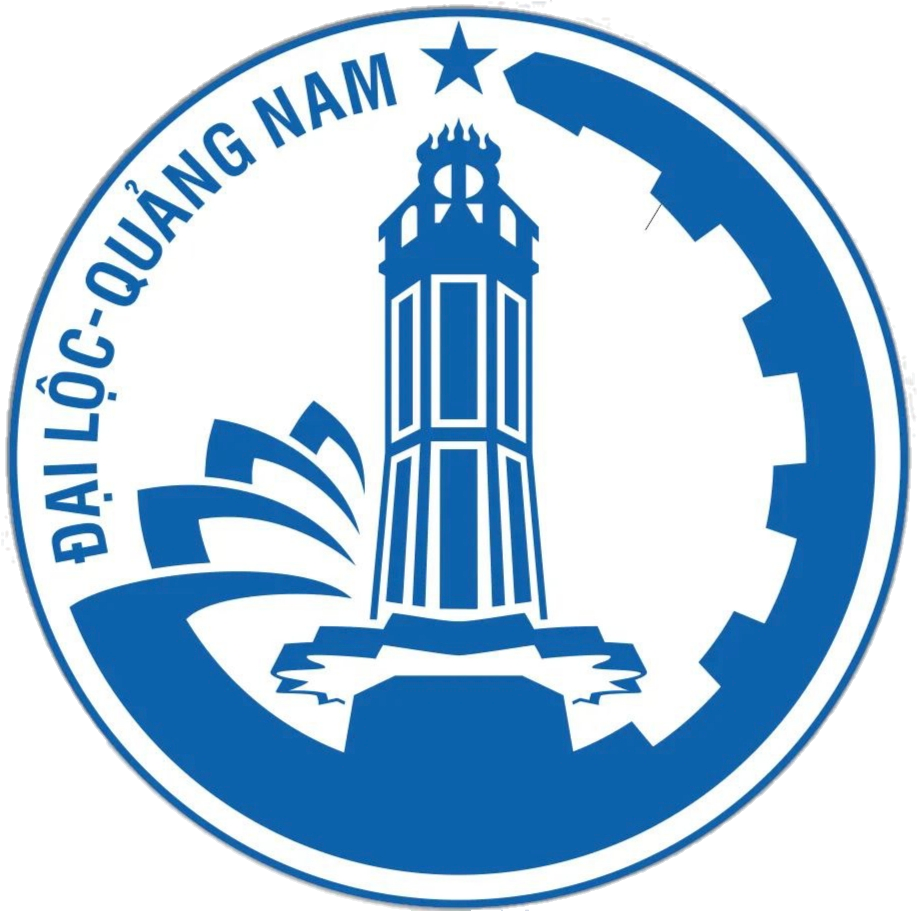
- Seal
- Interactive map of Đại Lộc district
- Country: Vietnam
- Region: South Central Coast
- Province: Quảng Nam
- Capital: Ái Nghĩa

Area
  - Total: 226 sq mi (586 km^{2})

Population (2003)
  - Total: 158,052
- Time zone: UTC+7 (Indochina Time)

Đại Lộc is a former rural district (huyện) of Quảng Nam province in the South Central Coast region of Vietnam. As of 2003, the district had a population of 158,052. The district covers an area of 586 km^{2}. The district capital lies at Ái Nghĩa.

== Divisions ==
Đại Lộc has 17 communes: Đại Đồng, Đại Hiệp, Đại Nghĩa, Đại An, Đại Quang, Đại Lãnh, Đại Hưng, Đại Minh, Đại Cường, Đại Thạnh, Đại Thắng, Đại Phong, Đại Hồng, Đại Hòa, Đại Chánh, Đại Tân and Đại Sơn.

== Geography ==
Đại Lộc district is 25 km southwest of Da Nang, 70 km north of Tam Kỳ, and is located on the East-West Economic Corridor that, apart from Vietnam, also goes through Myanmar, Thailand and Laos.

== Tourism ==
=== Places, landmarks and events ===
- Suối Mơ
- Bang Am Ecotourism Zone
- Khe Lim Ravine
- Numerous creeks and waterfalls such as Gieo Waterfall, Dream Spring and Lim Mountain Creek
- Sailing boat festival (Vu Gia River)
