= Odd One In Vietnam =

Vietnamese comedy panel game show

- Genre: Comedy
- Presented by: Trấn Thành (season 1–5); Trường Giang (season 6)
- Starring: Việt Hương (season 1–2, 5–6); Hoài Linh (season 1–2, 5); Vân Sơn (season 3–4); Hồng Đào (season 3–4); Trấn Thành (season 6)
- Country of origin: Vietnam
- Original language: Vietnamese
- No. of series: 6
- No. of episodes: 92+4 specials

Production
- Executive producer: Trương Văn Minh
- Production location: Ho Chi Minh City
- Cinematography: Thiên Trường
- Running time: 90 mins (inc. adverts)
- Production company: Đông Tây Promotion

Original release
- Network: HTV
- Release: 30 March 2014 – present

Related
- Odd One In

Người bí ẩn is a Vietnamese comedy panel game show based on British ITV's Odd One In, produced by Đông Tây Promotion and broadcast on the HTV. It is hosted by comedian Trấn Thành for the first five seasons and then by Trường Giang for the sixth season. It is starred by comedians Việt Hương and Hoài Linh in role of regular Home Team (aka Husband & Wife). The first season of the show debuted on March 30, 2014. 13 episodes were ordered and 26 celebrities were invited to act as 13 Away Teams.

== Format ==
Two teams take on a guessing game with a series of unusual, unlikely and often unbelievable line-ups. The celebrity teams have to work out who in each line up has the odd skill, talent or secret. The teams are allowed to ask questions to the line up, to determine which of the number of available choice is the Odd One In. The fifth and final round features familiar faces from the previous rounds where a member of each of the previous rounds return for one last Odd One In. At the end of the games, the winning team was awarded a cash prize by multiplying scores from both teams by 5,000,000 VND.

== Overview ==
=== Original series ===
Series	Episodes	Originally released	
Series	Episodes	First released	Last released
1	15	30 March 2014	29 June 2014
2	15	16 March 2015	21 June 2015

=== Episode details ===
No. overall	No. in series	Title	Away team	Original release date
1	1	"Episode 101"	Lê Hoàng & Lý Nhã Kỳ: Win (4/7)	March 30, 2014
Line Ups; Whose hair is fake? ― Who can perform fire-breathing? ― Who is an actual cải lương artist? ― Who can perform sword-swallowing? and for the familiar faces round ― Who is a pole dancer?
2	2	"Episode 102"	Petey Nguyen & Thúy Diễm: Lose (3/8)	April 6, 2014
Line Ups; Who is the tallest? ― Who is a stuntman? ― Who is a professional beatboxer? ― To whom does that voice belong? and for the familiar faces round ― Who is a violist?
3	3	"Episode 103"	Đại Nghĩa & Lê Khánh: Draw (4/8)	April 13, 2014
Line Ups; Who is a tò he craftsperson? ― Who is a professional pianist? ― Who can perform needle-swallowing? ― Who is a Latin dancer? and for the familiar faces round ― Who is a DJ?
4	4	"Episode 104"	Xuân Lan & Nam Trung: Win (3/5)	April 20, 2014
Line Ups; Who can be in the box? ― Who is a dog trainer? ― By eyelids who can lift water buckets? ― Who is actually a poet? and for the familiar faces round ― Who can play đàn bầu?
5	5	"Episode 105"	Don Nguyen & Kathy Uyên: Lose (1/4)	April 27, 2014
Line Ups; Who is actually a philatelist? ― Who can perform lightbulb-swallowing? ― Who is a freestyle hip hop dancer? ― Who is actually a balloon modeller? and for the familiar faces round ― Who is a dân ca singer?
6	6	"Episode 106"	Jennifer Phạm & Nathan Lee: Draw (2/4)	May 4, 2014
Line Ups; Who is actually a jazz dancer? ― Who is a stilt walker? ― Who is a magician? ― Who can perform razor glade-swallowing? and for the familiar faces round ― Who is actually a target person?
7	7	"Episode 107"	Ngọc Lan & Trường Giang: Lose (1/5)	May 11, 2014
Line Ups; Who is actually a guitarist? ― Who can perform snake-swallowing? ― Who is actually a belly-dancer? ― Who is not a person of Huế descent? and for the familiar faces round ― Who is actually a contortionist archer?
8	8	"Episode 108"	Huy Khánh & Khởi My: Win (4/7)	May 18, 2014
Line Ups; Who is the heaviest? ― Who cannot twirl a hula hoop? ― With head who can smash bricks? ― Who can actually perform sand animation? and for the familiar faces round ― Who can tap-dance?
9	9	"Episode 109"	Uyên Linh & Phan Anh: Lose (0/2)	May 25, 2014
Line Ups; Who is a professional model? ― Who mastered vovinam? ― Who can perform nose-drilling? ― Who gave birth? and for the familiar faces round ― Who is the guitarist in a rock band?
10	10	"Episode 110"	Kyo York & Trác Thúy Miêu: Draw (1/2)	June 1, 2014
Line Ups; Who is a Bollywood dancer? ― Who is the bride of the identified groom? ― Who plays đàn đá? ― Who can handwalk in the longest time? and for the familiar faces round ― Who sings opera?
11	11	"Episode 111"	Miu Lê & Isaac: Draw (4/8)	June 8, 2014
Line Ups; Who is a flutist? ― By piercing who can lift heavy items? ― Who is a ballet dancer? ― Who can professionally play đàn tranh? and for the familiar faces round ― Who is a lion dance performer?
12	12	"Episode 112"	Trương Nam Thành & Phan Như Thảo	June 15, 2014
Line Ups
13	13	"Episode 113"	Phương Vy & John Huy Trần	June 22, 2014
Line Ups
14	14	"Episode 114"	Rewind	June 29, 2014
Not Applied
