= Vân Sơn (comedian) =

Vietnamese comedian

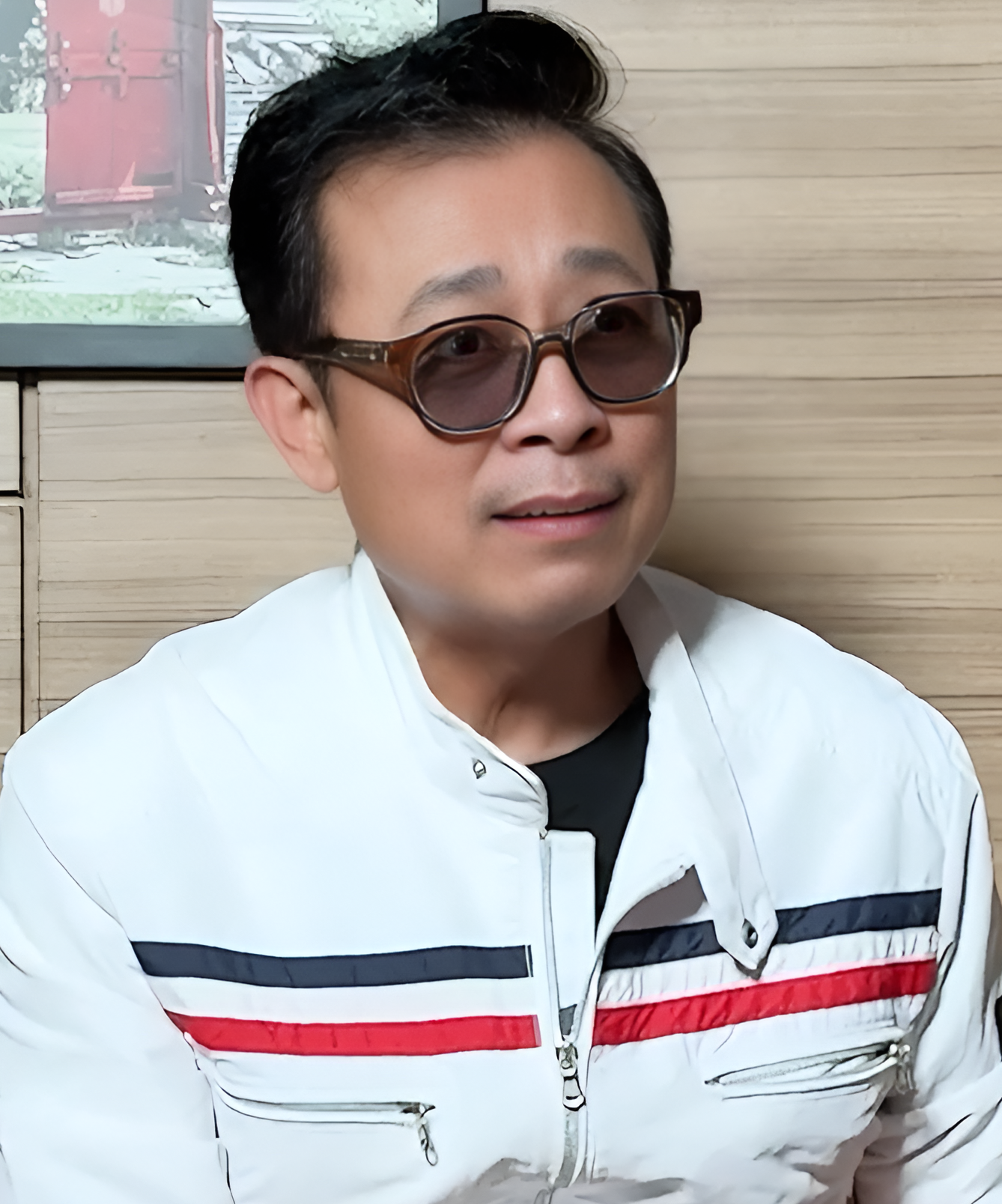
- Vân Sơn in 2026
- Born: Dương Thanh Sơn; October 5, 1961 (age 65); Saigon, South Vietnam
- Occupation: Comedian
- Years active: 1990–present

Dương Thanh Sơn (born October 5, 1961), better known by his stage name Vân Sơn, is a Vietnamese-American comedian. He is the founder and director of Vân Sơn Entertainment.

== Biography and career ==
Dương Thanh Sơn was born on October 5, 1961, in Saigon, into a family with artistic traditions. His relatives include artist Nguyễn Dương, Nguyễn Chánh Tín, actor Johnny Trí Nguyễn, and director Charlie Nguyễn.

In 1988, he left Vietnam to migrate to the United States.

At the beginning of his career, Vân Sơn worked as a cheerleader in weddings, meetings, and tea rooms' events on the weekends. He and artist Quang Minh used to do voice work for Hong Kong films. In 1990, he co-operated with Bảo Liêm - the two later became the most popular comedian duo in the overseas Vietnamese community in California in the 90s.

In 1994, he established Vân Sơn Entertainment.

In 1996, when Bảo Liêm decided to stop working with him due to some conflicts, he found and started performing together with comedian Hoài Linh.

In 1999, after Hoài Linh returned to Vietnam, Bảo Liêm was invited to cooperate with Vân Sơn Entertainment again.

In 2018, Vân Sơn started performing with comedian Bảo Chung.

In recent years, Vân Sơn frequently went back to Vietnam and participated in various television game shows.

== Personal life ==
In 1990, Vân Sơn got married. Since then, he has had two sons.
