= Hoài Lâm =

Vietnamese ainger and actor

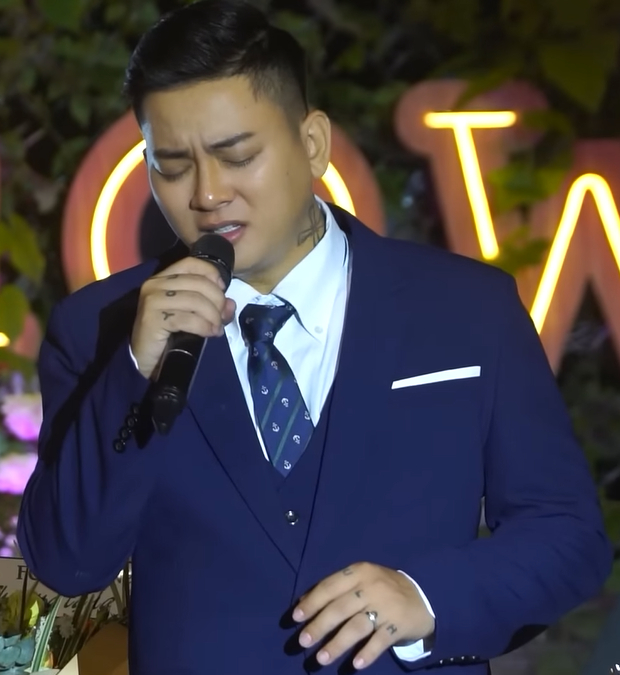
- Lâm in 2022

Background information
- Born: Nguyễn Tuấn Lộc; July 1, 1995 (age 31); Bình Tân, Vĩnh Long, Vietnam
- Genre: Vietnam Pop
- Occupations: Singer, actor
- Instrument: Vocals range G4-E5
- Years active: 2009–present

Võ Nguyễn Hoài Lâm (birth name: Nguyễn Tuấn Lộc, born Vĩnh Long July 1, 1995), stage name Hoài Lâm, is a Vietnamese pop singer and actor.

== Early life and career ==
Hoai Lam is a singer, who majored in Vietnamese folk and country songs. He has become well known all over Vietnam after winning the first prize in season 2 of reality television show Gương mặt thân quen (Your Face Looks Familiar) of Vietnam Television (VTV) in 2014. In the show Your Face Looks Familiar, he performed the role of Celine Dion, Mario Maurer, Andrea Bocelli, Marc Anthony, Adele and some other Vietnamese singers. He is a god son of Hoai Linh – an actor, MC and a singer in Vietnam

Hoai Lam is the only son of family with tradition in art performance. His father is South opera artist who used to be active alongside artist Cam Tien-one the most famous South opera artist in Ho Chi Minh City. His biological father's name is Nguyen Van Mo, his mother is Thai Thanh Loan. They both manage one South opera crew in Vinh Long which often operates South opera shows at fairs in Vinh Long.

=== Relationship with Hoai Linh ===
Back in 2008, when he was 13 years old, through introduction of his father, he went to Ho Chi Minh City to meet comedian Hoai Linh to learn singing and acting. After convincing, Hoai Linh decided to foster him and put him under stage name "Hoai Lam". Besides teaching him, Hoai Linh also introduced him to many TV and music shows. He also joined in many shows of Hoai Linh or as an assistance sometimes.

Hoai Lam often calls Hoai Linh "bo" (to distinguish Hoai Linh with his biological father who is called "cha")

=== Relationship with Dam Vinh Hung ===
Through Hoai Linh, Dam Vinh Hung taught Hoai Lam about vocal and stage techniques. It was said that Dam Vinh Hung agreed to help and support Hoai Lam as a pay back for Hoai Linh's previous help when Dam Vinh Hung started his career.

== Career ==
=== Music ===
One of his debut performance was at liveshow Câu Hát Tình Quê as 9-year anniversary of female singer Bích Thảo on March 3,4/2009 which was held at Rainbow 126 Stage, Ho Chi Minh City. In December 2013, he recorded his first ever album title Ve Dau Mai Toc Nguoi Thuong consisted of 9 ballad songs which was produced and released by Rang Dong Studio

After the appearance in Gương Mặt Thân Quen TV show back in 2014, some of his songs had gone viral and drew much attention from the audiences.

Besides, he also recorded some covers by famous singers. However, these records was not officially released yet they was shared, viewed and streamed multiple times on online music streaming websites in Vietnam such as: Zing MP3, YouTube, Nhac Cua Tui,...

On August 5, 2014, he finally released his first pop single Như Những Phút Ban Đầu (composed by Tien Minh) on Zing MP3. The single was streamed for total 1 million views on Zing MP3 after 67 hours since the release (from 16:00 August 5, 2014 to 11:00 August 8, 2014) and gained 10 million of streaming after 23 days (until 12:9 August 28, 2014)

On September 2, 2014, the song Như Những Phút Ban Đầu and album Về Đâu Mái Tóc Người Thương together topped on Zing MP3 chart-one of the most popular online music chart in Vietnam.

On November 20, 2014, he released second single which was composed by himself titled Có Khi. The song was streamed for 1 million times on Zing after 28 hours since the release, up to now, the song has been streamed for 40 million times (December 25, 2015).

On January 28, 2015, he released short film MV directed by himself named Làm Cha, up to now, the MV has had more than 22 million views (December 25, 2015).

On February 10, 2015, he released an album titled Quay Về with 4 songs: Quay Về, Làm Cha, Me, Ngày Nào Còn Bé, up to now, the album has been streamed for 2 million times (December 25, 2015).

On May 16, 2015, he released the second album Vol. 2 Cô Bé Ngày Xưa which consisted of 8 ballad songs. The album was streamed for 1 million views after 2 days and topped on chart of Zing MP3 on May 26, 2015 as its total scoring was 4 times the album in second place. Up to now, the album has been streamed for 39 million times (December 25, 2015).

=== Acting ===
He also showed his acting skill and attractive sense of humor. He made appearance as supporting role in several comedies of comedian Hoai Linh and some of Nu Cuoi Moi Stage – Ho Chi Minh City. He also made appearance in some TV dramas such as: Những Con Búp Bê, Cha Rơ, Giọt Lệ Bên Sông, Đoạn Trường Nam Ai,....

In 2014, he was starred in Lunar New Year movie which was Quý Tử Bất Đắc Dĩ alongside famous actors and Hoai Linh, the movie was nationally released on February 12, 2015 and received much positive feedback and many reviews from the viewers.

In 2015, he continued to play a role in another Lunar New Year movie titled Tía Tui Là Cao Thủ which was released on January 29, 2016, the movie's revenue reached 50 billion after three weeks since the release.

=== Joining TV show "Guong Mat Than Quen" ===
Previously, he was only a newcomer which was barely recognized by the audiences, except those who prefer music tea rooms in Ho Chi Minh City and some at South West of South Vietnam. However, after winning the first prize of reality show Guong Mat Than Quen second season (2014), his name started to rise and begin to be well recognized by many.

In 2013, he made the first appearance on Guong Mat Than Quen first season as a guest of 9th gala show where he performed the song Về Đâu Mái Tóc Người Thương. Later, he continued to show up in final gala with the performance of the song Nghĩ Về Cha featuring Hoai Linh.

In 2014, through the introduction of composer Duc Huy (one of the judges of the show), he signed up for Guong Mat Than Quen second season. Throughout 12 episodes, he portrayed 13 artists and singers such as: Celine Dion, Mario Maurer, Andrea Bocelli, Marc Anthony, Dong Nhi, Khac Trieu, Adele, Quang Le, Nguyen Hung, Son Tung M-TP, Ha Thi Cau, Thanh Nga and Thanh Sang.

In first 11 shows, he scored 393 points in total and stayed on top over other 6 contestants. In final gala, for the portray of Thanh Nga and Thanh Sang, he continued to score the highest point and eventually won the first prize of the show based on evaluation from the judges, at the same time he was also the contestant that had the highest votes from the audiences and viewers for 58.15% via SMS and official website of the show.

However, during the show, he also faced several scandals, such as it was thought that he was favored by Hoai Linh (who is his godfather and the judge) and he was boycotted by Son Tung M-TP's fans due to the comment of the judge My Linh for saying his performance of the song Em Của Ngày Hôm Qua was better than Son Tung M-TP himself.

== Reception from the audience ==
Despite being new to the community, Hoai Lam has a diverse fanbase due to his performing of various music genres such as ballads, golden music, folk songs, South opera, and pop. He also plays the drum, piano, and guitar.

The viral of Guong Mat Than Quen 2014 popularised him. Audiences like him because he performs folk ballads, unlike other pop singers.

Moreover, his image was built to be friendly and close to the audience, less scandalous and well communicated towards everyone.

His fanclub has also expanded in Vietnam and overseas.
