= Đại Lộc =

Đại Lộc Xã Đại Lộc
- Commune
- Đại Lộc commune
- Location within Vietnam
- Coordinates: 15°52′59″N 108°07′07″E
- Country: Vietnam
- Region: South Central Coast
- Province: Đà Nẵng
- Time zone: UTC+7 (UTC + 7)

Đại Lộc is a commune (xã) in Đà Nẵng, Vietnam. It is one of the 93 new wards, communes and special zones of the city following the reorganization in 2025.

On June 16, 2025, the Standing Committee of the National Assembly issued Resolution No. 1667/NQ-UBTVQH15 on the arrangement of commune-level administrative units in Da Nang in 2025. Accordingly, the entire natural area and population of Ái Nghĩa Township and the communes of Đại Hiệp, Đại Hòa, Đại An, and Đại Nghĩa (formerly in Đại Lộc district of Quảng Nam province) were merged to form a new commune named Đại Lộc Commune.
