= Cam Ranh =

Cam Ranh Phường Cam Ranh
- Ward
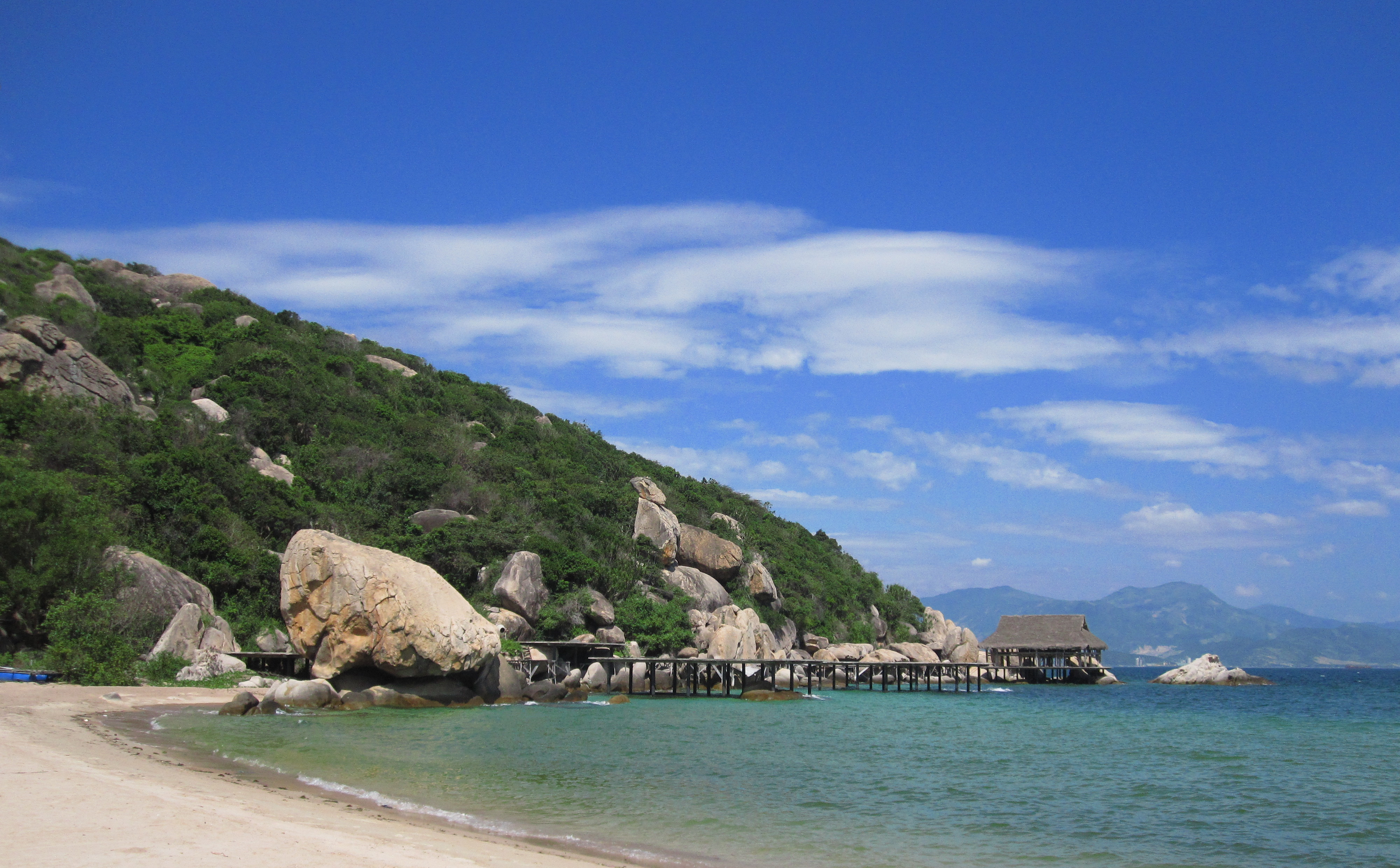
- Cam Ranh beach view from Ngọc Sương Cam Ranh resort
- Interactive map of Cam Ranh
- Coordinates: 11°54′49″N 109°8′13″E
- Country: Vietnam
- Province: Khánh Hòa province
- Established: June 16, 2025

Area
  - Total: 6.76 sq mi (17.51 km^{2})

Population (2025)
  - Total: 31,237
  - Density: 4,620/sq mi (1,784/km^{2})
- Time zone: UTC+07:00 (Indochina Time)

Cam Ranh is a ward of Khánh Hòa province, Vietnam. It is one of the 65 new wards, communes and special zones of the province following the reorganization in 2025.

== History ==
On June 16, 2025, the National Assembly Standing Committee issued Resolution No. 1667/NQ-UBTVQH15 on the arrangement of commune-level administrative units of Khánh Hòa province in 2025 (effective from June 16, 2025). Accordingly, the entire land area and population of Cam Lộc, Cam Phú and Cam Phúc Nam wards of the former Cam Ranh city will be integrated into a new ward named Cam Ranh (Clause 49, Article 1).
