= Hoài Linh =

Vietnamese and American comedian, actor (1969– )

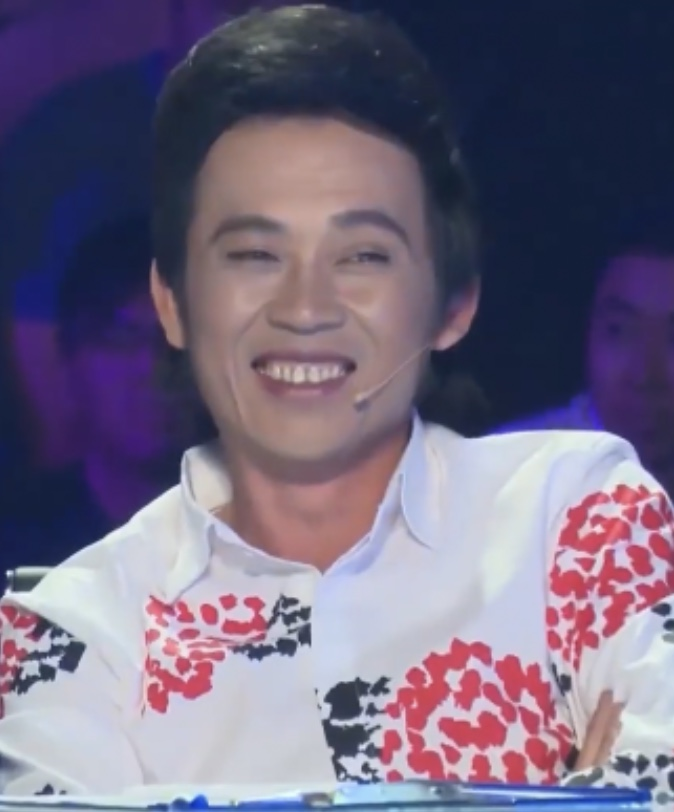
- Linh in 2020
- Born: Võ Nguyễn Hoài Linh; December 18, 1969 (age 56); Cam Ranh, Khánh Hòa, South Vietnam
- Other names: Ông Sáu Bảnh; Anh Bốn
- Occupations: Comedian; Actor
- Years active: 1987–present
- Spouse: Lê Thanh Hương (m. 1996; div. 2010)
- Children: 2
- Relatives: Dương Triệu Vũ (brother); Hoài Lâm (adopted son)

Võ Nguyễn Hoài Linh (born December 18, 1969), better known by his stage name Hoài Linh, is a Vietnamese and American comedian and actor. A frequent collaborator of Thúy Nga center, he is known for his comedy performances alongside other artists such as Vân Sơn and Chí Tài.

== Biography ==
Hoài Linh was born on December 18, 1969, in Cam Ranh, Khánh Hòa, Vietnam in a Catholic family with 6 children (3 boys, 3 girls). He is the third child and the eldest son in the family. His parents are from Đại Lộc, Quảng Nam. With the exception of his eldest sister – who were married and remained in Vietnam, his family moved to the United States under the HO status in 1995 – due to the fact that his father previously served in the Republic of Vietnam's Special Forces as a captain. His mother, Nguyễn Thị Lệ Phương, ran a private maternity home in Cam Ranh.

Hoài Linh lived in Cam Ranh up until 1975. He then moved with his family to Dầu Giây. In 1988, his family returned to Cam Ranh. Later, they moved to Ho Chi Minh City in 1992 and migrated to the United States at the end of 1993. During this time, Hoài Linh joined the Ponaga music and dance troupe. He studied at a specialized dance school up until 1994, when he returned to the dance group.

In 1991, he participated in a singing contest in Nha Trang. Here, he met Thanh Lộc – an actor from Khánh Hòa's recently disbanded theater department. Thanh Lộc proposed that they formed a comedy duo in the Ponaga group's performances. Hoài Linh happily accepted the invitation. Since then, he officially entered the comedy industry. His first performance took place at Diên Khánh.

Hoài Linh is known for his ability to speak various Vietnamese dialects. Upon moving to Long Khánh, he had the opportunity to talk to people from different regions, this allowed him to learn how to imitate their accents.

After migrating to the United States, his family stayed in Orlando, Florida. Here, he was invited to host a wedding at Saigon restaurant. After that, he was regularly invited to perform at many shows.

Around October 1994, Hoài Linh returned to California. He lived at his 10th uncle's house in Los Angeles. Two weeks later, he had the opportunity to visit Little Saigon and was taken by Nhật Tùng to Tao Nhân café. Here, he performed a comedy of Chuyện tình Karaoke. His acting captured the attention of scriptwriter Ngô Tấn Triển. One week later, Hoài Linh met comedian Vân Sơn and was invited to cooperate with him after comedian Bảo Liêm suddenly stopped collaborating with Vân Sơn.

In October 1994, the duo Vân Sơn – Hoài Linh officially performed together in an event held in Orange County. In 1999, after his return to Vietnam, Hoài Linh established his own business called "Hoài Linh Comedy Music". Later, he started collaborating with Thúy Nga Center and New Smile Company. He and comedian Chí Tài remained friends up until the latter died on December 9, 2020.

On January 10, 2016, Hoài Linh was honored with the title of Merited Artist of Vietnam. He was the first overseas Vietnamese artist to receive this recognition.

== Controversy ==
=== Allegations of Construction on Agricultural Land ===
In September 2015, Võ Nguyễn Hoài Linh (the comedian Hoài Linh's real name) began construction on several parts of his ancestral worship temple on a plot of land measuring over 7,000 square meters in Long Phước Ward, District 9 (now Thủ Đức City). At that time, the land was still designated as agricultural land and had not been converted for construction purposes. Consequently, the construction projects underway were also determined by District 9's functional units to lack permits.

On February 16, 2016, regarding Hoài Linh's ancestral temple, which was alleged to have been built illegally on agricultural land, the leaders of District 9's People's Committee stated that the illegally constructed portion of the temple was approximately 500 square meters, resulting in an administrative fine of 6.2 million VND. Sources from Ho Chi Minh City Law confirmed that construction was temporarily suspended due to Hoài Linh's illegal construction on agricultural land.

=== Accusations of 'Holding' Charity Funds ===
After calling for donations to support people affected by the 2020 Central Vietnam floods, Hoài Linh received a total of over 14 billion VND transferred to his account. However, by the end of May 2021, following a controversial incident with Nguyễn Phương Hằng, it was discovered that Hoài Linh had not yet transferred these funds to the local areas in need of charitable assistance.

On the morning of May 24th, artist Hoài Linh officially admitted that, up to that point, the amount of money donated to support Central Vietnam from October 2020 was not over 13 billion VND, but rather over 14.67 billion VND. He stated that the reason for the delay in delivering the funds to the people of Central Vietnam was due to the impact of the escalating pandemic situation.

This further fueled public skepticism, as during the preceding period, specifically on January 19th and April 8, 2021, Hoài Linh still participated in charitable programs with Vina Acecook Company, the Mì Hảo Hảo brand, and the Vietnam Children's Fund, donating over 1,000 gifts to disadvantaged children in the two provinces of Điện Biên and Lai Châu.

Amidst a consumer boycott in Vietnam against products featuring Hoài Linh, following scandals related to charity funds, Shopee and Nutifood simultaneously removed all images of Hoài Linh from their advertising campaigns, stating that it was 'to avoid any unwanted situations.

On June 5, 2021, Hoài Linh posted a video explaining his charitable fundraising activities to support the Central Vietnam flood victims in 2020. He acknowledged that his actions had caused public outrage and issued an apology. Previously, on May 24th, in a video explaining the delay in delivering over 13 billion VND in aid to Central Vietnam, Hoài Linh asserted that he would not trade his 30-year career and the public's affection for that amount of money.

On September 22nd, the Investigative Police Department of Ho Chi Minh City Police announced that they had received complaints from Hoài Linh, Đàm Vĩnh Hưng, Vy Oanh, and several other artists against Nguyễn Phương Hằng, concerning issues related to the defamation of public figures. On December 22nd, the Investigative Police Department of Ho Chi Minh City Police concluded that Hoài Linh did not show any signs of embezzling charity funds and decided not to initiate a criminal case.

== Personal life ==
In August 1996, Hoài Linh returned to Vietnam to visit Lê Thanh Hương, his girlfriend whom he had met before leaving the country. Lê Thanh Hương worked at a karaoke bar he frequented. This connection inspired him to name his latest CD "Tình Karaoke" (Karaoke Love). His trip to Vietnam was to officially marry Lê Thanh Hương and sponsor her to live with him in the United States, starting in April 1997. However, they separated in 2010 and have remained apart since.

Hoài Linh has two biological children: Võ Lê Thành Vinh (born in 1990) and a younger daughter (born in 2012). Additionally, he has numerous adopted children, among whom Hoài Lâm and Cao Hữu Thiên are widely recognized. Recently, Hoài Linh adopted Nguyệt Cát, the beloved daughter of comedian Thúy Nga. Hoài Linh is the biological brother of singer Phương Trang and singer Dương Triệu Vũ (whose real name is Võ Nguyễn Tuấn Linh).

Although his parents were Catholics, and he himself was raised in the Catholic faith, bearing the baptismal name Benedict (Biển Đức). He has shared that, as a child, he served as an altar boy in church. Later, Hoài Linh has converted to Đạo Mẫu (Mother Goddess worship) tradition and the veneration of the patron spirits of his craft. However, in 2023, during a spring-themed event at St. Dominic’s Parish Church (Ba Chuông) in Ho Chi Minh City, Hoài Linh publicly returned to the Catholic faith, describing himself as a "lost sheep that has returned."

== Acting work ==
- Kì Phùng Địch Thủ: as Hoài Linh (performing with Bảo Chung)
- 10 Năm Nhìn Lại
- Ai Câm: as the rich man (Liveshow Chí Tài Comedian 2008)
- Áo em chưa mặc một lần
- Anh không đòi quà
- Anh Sáu Về Quê
- Âm dương đôi đường: as the wizard Trần Phiêu Diêu
- Bà ơi! Đóng Cửa Lại: as the old husband
- Bà Tốn Lấy Le: as the old husband
- Bà mẹ vợ (Bán hoa bạo lực): as the mother-in-law
- Bác Ba Phi: as Mr. Ba Phi
- Bác sĩ Miệt Vườn: as the doctor
- Bầy Vịt Cái: as the pregnant wife
- Bốn Mùa
- Con sáo sang sông
- Cá Cuộc
- Cha Yêu
- Chân Dài: as the director's assistant
- Chân Quê
- Chết chắc rồi
- Chị Dâu Té Giếng
- Chia gia tài
- Chồng Ghen
- Chưa Chắc Đâu Ba: as Tí's father
- Chuyện Nàng Hoa hậu
- Chuyện Tình Chàng Họa Sĩ
- Chuyện Tình Yêu
- Chuyện Xứ Người: as the husband
- Con ma mặc áo bà ba
- Cờ Bạc
- Cổ tích một tình yêu: as Nhi's father
- Của Tôi Mà
- Cuộc thi Không Chuyên: as Hoài Linh
- Cướp cạn
- Cười Với Việt Hương 3
- Cương Thi Thiếu Nợ
- Đại Nhạc Hội Hài Hoài Linh & Kiều Oanh
- Đánh Ghen: as the jealous wife
- Đạo diễn kỳ tài
- Dâu đất khách: as Mr. Chín
- Đây không phải là Thiên đường
- Đệ nhất thần thấu
- Đèo gió hú: as Linh
- Đèn thần
- Đi chùa cầu duyên: as Thị Mầu
- Đi Hỏi Già, Về Nhà Hỏi Trẻ: as the grandpa
- Đi Thi Hoa hậu: as the beauty contestant
- Du Học: as Mr. Tám
- Đường Đại gia: as Đường đại gia
- Duyên Nợ
- Gã lưu manh và chàng khờ
- Gái: as the brother
- Gia tộc hà tiện: as the old wife
- Gieo quẻ đầu năm
- Kẻ gian (performing with Nguyễn Dương)
- Khó: as the friend of Mười Khó
- Hạc tiên
- Hết lông rồi
- Hội thi chim
- Lầm
- Qua cơn giông bão: as Thuận
- Quả Đào Lửa
- Ra Giêng anh cưới em: as Sáu Bảnh
- Rượu: as Nguyễn Văn Hải
- Ru lại câu hò
- Tân Ngao Sò ốc Hến: as Hến (Liveshow Bảo Quốc 50 năm vui cười cùng sân khấu)
- Tệ hơn vợ thằng Đậu 2
- Thám tử Sê Lốc Hom
- Thà ăn mày hơn ăn cướp
- Thằng Mắm Con Muối: as Mắm
- Thiện ác vô song: as the master
- Tiều Phu bỏ mẹ: as the woodcutter
- Tình cha
- Tình con
- Tommy Tèo: as Tommy Tèo
- Tuyển Lựa ca sĩ
- Trạng chết chúa băng hà: as Trạng Quỳnh
- Thế giới huyền bí
- Trời xanh nhổ lệ
- Tư Ếch nằm mơ: as Tư Ếch's child
- Trăm nhớ ngàn thương
- Sư lịnh tích thành hoàng sống: as Tân
- Oan gia ngõ hẹp
- Ông Bà Vú
- Ông Địa: as the land genie
- Ở đợ siêu cấp
- Lấy Chồng Đi Con
- Lấy Vợ Năm Rồng
- Lỗi Ai
- Lưu Bình – Dương Lễ: as Lưu Bình
- Lý Lửa Gần Rơm
- Ly Miêu Hoán Chúa: as Quách Hòe
- Lý Phụ Tình
- Ma Túy
- Mất Trí Nhớ / Kém trí nhớ: as the doctor (performing with Vân Sơn)
- Mẹ Yêu
- Món Quà Kỳ Diệu: as the husband
- Một Bà Hai Ông
- Một Duyên Hai Nợ Ba Tình
- Một Ngày Ở Trần Gian
- Một Ông Hai Bà: as the husband
- Mộng ca sĩ
- Nàng Dâu Tương Lai
- Nỗi đau đất dày: as the King of Hell
- Ngao Sò ốc Hến: as the district official
- Ngang trái: as Mạnh Dữ
- Nghề Chân Dài
- Ngôi nhà hạnh phúc: as Kim Yang Gay
- Ngôi Sao Một Ngày
- Ngủm vì game online: as Huy's father
- Người Hoài Cổ: as the old husband
- Người Nhà Quê: as Đặng's father
- Người Ở Siêu Cấp
- Nhà Bảo Sanh: as the husband
- Nợ Duyên
- Nơi Bắt Đầu Một Dòng Sông (Thanh Ngân Live Show)
- Nhà dột từ nóc: as the father
- 2!Idol
- Viện dưỡng lão
- Vợ chồng thằng đậu bây giờ: as Đậu
- Vỡ mộng
- Vợ thằng đậu: as Đậu's father
- Xem mắt nàng dâu: as Nga's mother
- Xuất giá tòng phu
- Xe ôm: as Linh the driver
