= Tân Dĩnh =

Coordinates: 16°48′N 106°59′E

- Commune and village
- Interactive map of Tân Dĩnh
- Country: Vietnam
- City: Bắc Ninh
- Time zone: UTC+07:00

Tân Dĩnh is a commune (xã) and village in Bắc Ninh, in northeastern Vietnam.
