= Mỹ Thái, Bắc Ninh =

Mỹ Thái
- Commune and village
- Location in Vietnam
- Coordinates: 21°20′N 106°14′E
- Country: Vietnam
- City: Bắc Ninh
- Time zone: UTC+7 (UTC+7)

Mỹ Thái is a commune (xã) in Bắc Ninh, in northeastern Vietnam.
