= Kim Sơn =

Kim Sơn may refer to several places in Vietnam, including:

- Kim Sơn: commune in Đồng Tháp province.
- Kim Sơn: commune in Gia Lai province.
- Kim Sơn: commune in Ninh Bình province.
- Kim Sơn pagoda: these are the names of many pagodas in Vietnam.

== Names of former places ==
- Kim Sơn: district in Ninh Bình province (today part of Chất Bình commune, Kim Sơn commune, Quang Thiện commune, Phát Diệm commune, Lai Thành commune, Định Hóa commune, Bình Minh commune and Kim Đông commune, all belonging to Ninh Bình province).
- Kim Sơn: commune in Châu Thành district, Tiền Giang province (today part of Kim Sơn commune, Đồng Tháp province)
- Kim Sơn: ward in Đông Triều provincial city, Quảng Ninh province (today part of Mạo Khê ward, Quảng Ninh province).
- Kim Sơn: commune-level town in Quế Phong district, Nghệ An province (today part of Quế Phong commune, Nghệ An province).
- Kim Sơn: commune in Lục Ngạn district, Bắc Giang province (today part of Biển Động commune, Bắc Ninh).
- Kim Sơn: commune in Sơn Tây district-level town, Hanoi capital municipality (today part of Đoài Phương commune, Hanoi capital municipality.
- Kim Sơn: commune in Gia Lâm district, Hanoi capital municipality (today part of Gia Lâm and Thuận An communes).
- Kim Sơn: commune in Bảo Yên district, Lào Cai province (today part of Bảo Hà commune, Lào Cai province).
- Kim Sơn: commune in Kim Bôi district, Hòa Bình province (today part of Hợp Kim commune, Phú Thọ province).
- Kim Sơn: commune in Định Hóa district, Thái Nguyên province (today part of Kim Phượng commune, Thái Nguyên province)
- Kim Sơn: commune in Trà Cú district, Trà Vinh province (today part of Hàm Giang commune, Vĩnh Long province).
