= Vũ Ngọc Nhạ =

Vietnamese spy (1928–2002)

- Born: Vũ Xuân Nhã; March 30, 1928; Vũ Hội, Vũ Thư, Thái Bình, Indochina
- Died: August 7, 2002 (aged 74); Ho Chi Minh City, Vietnam
- Other names: Hai Long, Mr. Advisor
- Military career
- Allegiance: People's Army of Vietnam
- Branch: Intelligence Agency
- Service years: 1945-1989
- Rank: Major general
- Awards: Order of Independence, 3rd Rank; Order of Resistance against America, 1st Rank; Feat Order, 1st Rank (once), 2nd Rank (twice), 3rd Rank (once); Military Exploit Order, 3rd Rank; Resolution for Victory Order, 3rd Rank and others

Pièrre Vũ Ngọc Nhạ (1928-2002) is an intelligence officer of the People's Army of Vietnam. He carried out espionage activities during the Vietnam War under the cover of a high-rank officer of many South Vietnam governments. He was the core member of the A.22 espionage group during the late 1960s before his arrest by CIA in 1969.

Nhạ and his colleagues managed to retrieved many important documents about the strategic plans and intentions of United States and Saigon government for the National Liberation Front of South Vietnam and the Democratic Republic of Vietnam, including the Strategic Hamlet Program, the Stanley-Taylor plan, the Plan for Rural Pacification, the Phoenix Plan, the plan for introducing U.S. troops into Vietnam.

Vũ Ngọc Nhạ was known under the nickname "Ông cố vấn" (Mr. Advisor) due to his advisory role for Ngô Đình Diệm and Nguyễn Văn Thiệu. He also had other names including Vũ Ngọc Nhã, Hoàng Đức Nhã, Vũ Đình Long (or Hai Long), Lê Quang Kép, Preacher Hai, Preacher Four (because he was a Catholic preacher who finished four grades of religious training).

Vũ Ngọc Nhạ is the main character of the historical novel Ông Cố vấn (Mr. Advisor) written by Hữu Mai, which was adapted in to a television series with the same name.

== Childhood ==
Vũ Ngọc Nhạ was born as Vũ Xuân Nhã on March 30, 1928, at his paternal homeland in Vũ Hội, district Vũ Thư, Thái Bình province, however he spent much of his childhood in the maternal homeland of the Phát Diệm Parish in Ninh Bình. At the age of 15, Vũ Ngọc Nhạ went to Huế to attend the Thuận Hoá Highschool. He then made contacts with Việt Minh and was joined the Communist Party of Vietnam on June 20, 1947.

Vũ Ngọc Nhạ participated in Viet Minh's resistance war against French invasion of Vietnam in 1946. After the Battle of Hà Nội, he retreated to Thái Bình and took part in Viet Minh's PR missions at the Catholic population in Thái Bình. He was appointed as Secretary of Party's Committee and then Party's Town Committee Member of Thái Bình in 1951, to revitalize Viet Minh's forces under intense French military activities in that area. Nhạ participated in a successful attack against a French prison facility, released thousands of prisoners there. In 1952, Vũ Ngọc Nhạ (under the alias Vũ Ngọc Kép), as a representative of Thái Bình province, participated at the "Conference of Guerilla Warfare in North Vietnam", held at Việt Bắc. During that conference, president Hồ Chí Minh gave Vũ Ngọc Nhạ the task of gathering information and data of United States plans and intentions in Vietnam. In 1953, via the recommendation of Đỗ Mười, Vũ Ngọc Nhạ was recruited by Trần Quốc Hương as a trainer for intelligence agents working inside the Catholic population.

== Gaining the trust of Ngô Đình Diệm and Catholic clergy ==
Vũ Ngọc Nhạ was amongst many North Vietnamese intelligence agents sent to South Vietnam for intelligence activities after the 1954 Geneva Accords, under the cover of a devout Catholic adherent who were upset with Viet Minh's "discrimination" against his family and religion and them "defected" to participate in Self-Defence Militia of Phát Diệm, which were under the leadership of anti-communist Bishop Lê Hữu Từ and priest Hoàng Quỳnh. He went to the South together with the Catholic migrants in 1955, using a new identity Vũ Đình Long. The data presented in his resume were mostly the truth, including the fact that he joined the Communist Party. The only false information was "upset" with Viet Minh and his real reason for "defection".

Vũ Ngọc Nhạ was instructed by Trần Quốc Hương to build a good relationship with Bishop Lê Hữu Từ because Bishop Lê was well-known both in the Vietnamese Catholic population and in the Vatican. Moreover, since Hoàng Quỳnh has good relationship with Bishop Lê, and Vũ Ngọc Nhạ's membership of Phát Diệm Militia was certificated by priest Hoàng Quỳnh, Trần Quốc Hương also instructed Nhạ to reinforce relationship with Hoàng Quỳnh. Good relationships with both Lê and Hoàng was very beneficial for Vũ Ngọc Nhạ's espionage missions later. Furthermore, Vũ Ngọc Nhạ discovered the discords and conflicts between Ngô Đình Diệm's regime and Catholic dignitaries - including bishop Lê - although Ngô Đình Diệm and his brothers were also devout Catholics. Vietnamese Catholic clergy was under the great French influence, while Ngô Đình Diệm was supported by the United States, therefore distrust persisted between the two sides despite Diệm's desire to gain the support from the Catholic population. Therefore, acting as the intermediary envoy might help Vũ Ngọc Nhạ in gaining the trust and credibility from both Diệm and Catholic clergy.

However Vũ Ngọc Nhạ was suspected by South Vietnam counter-espionage agency as a North Vietnamese spy and was arrested at the end of 1958. He was jailed at Toà Khâm, Huế, together with many other suspected North Vietnamese intelligence agents, including his mentor Trần Quốc Hương. He quickly exploited that situation to established communication with his colleagues to prepare for counter-measures. Moreover, Huế leader Ngô Đình Cẩn allowed Catholic prisoners to attend Sunday church rituals. Vũ Ngọc Nhạ used that chance to make contact with Ngô Đình Cẩn and the Catholic clergy, including Bishop Lê. Knowing Vũ Ngọc Nhạ's relationship with Lê Hữu Từ and Hoàng Quỳnh, both sides decided to accept Nhạ's role as intermediary envoy. Moreover, during the imprisonment, Vũ Ngọc Nhạ's essay "The dangers threaten our [South Vietnam] regime" attracted the interest of Ngô family. Nhạ intentionally stated that he consulted the ideas of bishop Lê and other Catholic figures, tacitly implied his relationship with the people that Ngô family had to reconcile with. Furthermore, Nhạ's correct prediction of the 1960 South Vietnamese coup attempt increased his prestige in the eyes of Ngô brothers. Thanks to careful preparation and the assistance of Hoàng Quỳnh, Vũ Ngọc Nhạ was cleared of all charges but was still unofficially imprisoned until 1961.

Vũ Ngọc Nhạ, using his envoy role and good relationship with Catholic dignitaries, managed to gain the trust of Ngô brothers. Ngô Đình Diệm treated Nhạ as his family and considered him as one of the "five dragons" of Ngô regime. Trần Lệ Xuân suspected Nhạ at first but gave up eventually. Close relationships with South Vietnam leadership and important politicians associated with them allowed Vũ Ngọc Nhạ to gather important data and information for his espionage missions and had considerable influence on politics. He began to have the nickname of "Mr. Advisor".

At the end of 1963, Ngô Đình Nhu tasked Vũ Ngọc Nhạ with the mission of meeting with and gaining support from Catholic population. As a result, Vũ Ngọc Nhạ did not get caught into the 1963 South Vietnamese coup which ended with the collapse of Ngô Đình Diệm regime together with most of its key members. According to Nhạ, if he had get caught in the coup, he would have met the same tragic fate as Ngô Đình Diệm and Ngô Đình Nhu.

== Nguyễn Văn Thiệu's presidency and the A.22 espionage group ==
After the 1963 coup, Vũ Ngọc Nhạ could only work in the Catholic population in Bình An parish led by Hoàng Quỳnh. However, due to Hoàng's great prestige, and also due Nhạ's own talent and knowledge, the new government resumed contact with Vũ Ngọc Nhạ for his advice. Vũ Ngọc Nhạ quickly make use of the "Golden Triangle" (Vatican's Apostolic Delegate, Saigon government and American Chaplain O'Connor) to intensify his espionage activities. He later built a relationship with Nguyễn Văn Thiệu, another Catholic figure. Similar to the Ngô family, Thiệu needed Nhạ as an intermediary envoy to gather support from the Catholic faction. Nhạ also detected that Thiệu had the support of the United States for the position of President and Thiệu also had good relationship with certain Catholic dignitaries. Nhạ became the representative for Catholic electorates who supported the presidency of Thiệu, and became Thiệu's "Mr. Advisor" after Thiệu was elected. Thiệu personally recognized the great influence of Nhạ on South Vietnam politics and on Thiệu himself, he told Nhạ: "If you want to depose me, please inform me beforehand so that I won't meet a shameful death as Ngô Đình Diệm brothers.".

Nhạ quickly made use of his position to build a huge espionage network inside the Saigon government named A.22, nominally led by Nguyễn Văn Lê (Tư Lê) and Nhạ himself was the deputy leader, directly supervised the network. Notable members of A.22 included Nguyễn Xuân Hoè, Vũ Hữu Ruật, Huỳnh Văn Trọng, Lê Hữu Thuý, Nguyễn Xuân Đồng... A member of A.22 network, Huỳnh Văn Trọng (a former South Vietnam Minister during the 1950s) managed to become the President's Assistant, once led a Saigon delegation to America and made use of such chances to perform his espionage activities.

Nhạ and the A.22 network took part in the 1968 Tet Offensive. He warned the National Liberation Front of South Vietnam of U.S. intention to curtail the annual Tết ceasefire. During the battle, Nhạ was tasked to assist the NLF in the planned assault to Independence Palace, he opened the presidential wine cellar so that the palace guards would become drunk. However, as the planned attacks was abandoned and the attack's highest target, Thiệu, was on his Tết vacation in Mỹ Tho. Assuming that the wine was distributed to improve morale, Thiệu commended Nhạ when he returned to the palace a few days later. He awarded Nhạ with a sword and an authority to manage the cabinet meetings in the case of Thiệu's absence.

In the wake of unsuccessful military attempts, the United States started to decrease their involvement in the Vietnam War and took a more serious stance in negiotations with Hanoi. However, the U.S. planned to execute the Accelerated Pacification Program and other related moves in order to gain an advantage in the bargain. Tasked with the investigation of United States intentions, Nhạ then asked Thiệu to send a diplomatic delegation led by Nhạ's colleagues Huỳnh Văn Trọng to the United States. Under the guise of preparing for the incoming diplomatic mission, Trọng went to the U.S. Ambassador to take the documents of 1968-1969 Pacification Plan, 1968 Phoenix Program and other related documents for Nhạ. Trọng's delegation later managed to secure U.S. aid for the Saigon government, which pleased Thiệu. Thiệu then reward Nhạ with the pen that Thiệu used to sign the documents for U.S. aid contracts.

The reports of South Vietnam Police Department admitted that no espionage group had ever been as successful as A.22. The tricks employed by A.22 was admitted to be "marvellous" and "excellent", and the data and information retrieved by A.22 "enable Hanoi to have well-confirmed facts to make the policies for the war."

In 1969, the A.22 group planned to create a South Vietnam "government" whose vital members were A.22 agents. However A.22's plan could not be materialized due to CIA's intervention.

== The case of Huỳnh Văn Trọng and forty-two espionage agents ==
The CIA became suspicious of the existence of spies at the highest levels of the South Vietnamese government and began the investigation. After a year, the CIA discovered the identity of Nhạ and his colleagues and sent the information to Saigon's Police Department for execution. As a result, almost all of A.22 members were arrested in July 1969. The A.22 network virtually collapsed. The case of A.22 was a severe shock to the Saigon government and quickly appeared on many South Vietnam newspapers at that time.

The A.22 members decided to make a counter-move to turn the tide of the situation. Using their strong influence, they persuaded the public and mass media that the arrests had a political agenda and was the result of political conflicts and the crime of "espionage" was just an excuse for political purge. They also used the chance to expose the internal conflicts between the political factions of South Vietnam and their U.S allies and promoted the idea of peace and unification in Vietnam.

The CIA's successful investigation quickly deteriorated into a political mess, because all of the defendants were involved with many high-rank statesmen and politicians. The "proof" for espionage activities of A.22 members turned into the affairs authorized by the president. The most important witness could not be summoned because he was Thiệu. Vatican and South Vietnam's Catholic figures also condemned the arrest as CIA and Thiệu's scheme to sabotage Vietnamese Catholics. To get rid of the problems, the CIA asked Nhạ to declare that he had been working for Cthe IA, Nhạ would be rewarded with a generous salary and additional payment of US$2 million if he accepted the proposal. Nhạ frustrated the CIA's attempt by an immediate refusal.

A.22's counter-attack was successful. None of the arrested member were sentenced to death. Nhạ was sentenced to life imprisonment, he was jailed in Saigon for a time and then was sent to Côn Đảo Prison. At Côn Đảo, Nhạ restored the contacts with his imprisoned A.22 colleagues and continued planning for future intelligence missions. The counter-move also sowed distrust inside South Vietnam's political arena. Thiệu himself also believed that Nhạ was innocent and all the arrests were a political conspiracy of CIA. Thiệu refused to make a move against Nhạ until the CIA made a direct threat against him. Moreover, vital information continued to be leaked after the destruction of A.22 further increasing Thiệu's trust in Nhạ. It was said that during the imprisonment of Nhạ at Côn Đảo, Thiệu replace Côn Đảo's governor with one of Thiệu's close assistant so that Nhạ can be treated well in prison.

Before being sent to Côn Đảo, Lê Hữu Thuý and Nhạ were jailed at the CIA's facility at 3A, Bạch Đằng Street, a facility infamous for brutal interrogation. Both were imprisoned in a 2m2 room each with abrupt changes in temperature, frequent interrogations using Polygraph, and other tortures. Both Thuý and Nhạ suffered from deteriotating health and severe illnesses during the imprisonment. Lê Hữu Thuý's situation was especially critical as he occasionally vomited blood and mucus. Later Nhạ, using his personal relationship with some medical staff in the prison, managed to smuggle some medicines and food to mitigate Thuý's condition.

== Activities in 1969-1975 ==
During his imprisonment, Nhạ continued to make contact, via letters or direct meeting, with many celebrities and dignitaries from South Vietnam and America. He was praised as the benefactor of the Pope in a praying mass on June 23, 1971, and was award with the Pope's blessing, a certification of merit, and an award medal. The awards were sent directly to Nhạ in prison by a Vatican ambassador on June 25.

Nhạ was released to the National Liberation Front of South Vietnam in 1973 as a political prisoner according to Paris Peace Accords. His role as an intelligent agent was recognized and he was made a Lieutenant colonel of the People's Army of Vietnam. He was awarded for the achievements of A.22 but at the same time was also punished for his responsibility of its collapse and the arrest of A.22 members. In 1974, Nhạ returned to Saigon to resume his intelligence activities and rebuild the connection with "the third political forces", especially the Catholic population. In 1975 he worked inside the third political forces as a Catholic representative and witnessed the last moments of the Saigon regime in April 1975.

Nhạ, using his influence amongst Catholic politicians, pressed for the resignation of Thiệu and the replacement of Thiệu by Dương Văn Minh. During the last days of Saigon government, Thiệu contacted Nhạ and asked for advice. Nhạ advised Thiệu to leave Saigon, but warned him not to settle in the U.S. because Thiệu would be murdered in America. Thiệu decided to follow Nhạ advice and lived the rest of his life in the U.K. Later, when being asked about saving the life of Thiệu, Nhạ commented "I believe that was a very humane policy of our government [i.e. Socialist Vietnam]."

== After 1975 ==
In 1976, Vũ Ngọc Nhạ worked at the Military Intelligence Department at the military rank of lieutenant colonel. He was promoted to the rank of colonel in 1981. He was tasked to collect, analyze the data and reported back to the high-rank leaders of the Socialist Republic of Vietnam. His life and intelligent activities became well known after the publishing of the historical novel Ông cố vấn (Mr. Advisor) written by Hữu Mai. Nhạ was promoted to major general in 1988 and was awarded the Title of "Hero of the People's Armed Forces" together with all the A.22 Group.

Vũ Ngọc Nhạ died on August 7, 2002, in Ho Chi Minh City at the age of 75. He was buried at Lạc Cảnh Cemetery at the section reserved for high-rank military officers. The graves of other well-known Vietnamese intelligence agents such as Phạm Xuân Ẩn, Đặng Trần Đức and Phạm Ngọc Thảo are also there.

== Assessment ==
Nhạ and his spouse, Phạm Thị Nhiệm, were well known for their integrity and incorruptibility. He never accepted any bribe and refused all the financial assistance proposed by Diệm, Thiệu or the CIA. Nhạ's wife have to sell vegetables to assist the family financial status. Nhạ's incorruptibility sometimes caused suspicion from anti-communist figures in South Vietnam because "only the Communists have no desire for neither money nor women." Ms. Phạm Thị Nhiệm explained: "If we accept their money, we have to work for them. If we work for them, that means we betray our Motherland. My husband once said: for a Communist, treachery is a taboo."

Nhạ's ability to impersonate a pro-Saigon, anti-communist figure sometimes surprised his own comrades. Mai Chí Thọ commented: "His behavior, voice, personality was the same as a reactionary priest. [...] A comrade of us who was able to impersonate our enemy to the level that even we could not detect, that was such a miracle of intelligence ability, that even I myself had never imagined before." His impersonation also caused him and his family to be wrongly condemned as a "traitors of the nation". Such misunderstandings were only solved after the war when Nhạ's real role became well known.

Nhạ was praised for the ability to use "moral" methods for his espionage tasks. Hữu Mai, author of the historical novel of Vũ Ngọc Nhạ's activities, commented that while many intelligence agents usually resort to fraud, coercion and tricks to get the information, Nhạ did things in a "human" way. He behaved like a moral priest, converted other people, including enemies, by morality and generosity. His deep knowledge and understanding in many aspects gained the admiration and respect of his enemies and many of these enemies came to him for advice.

== See more ==
- Ông cố vấn, historical novel about Vũ Ngọc Nhạ's espionage activities
- Ông cố vấn, film adaptation of the novel
