= Kim Son =

Kim Son may refer to:

- Kim Sơn district, Ninh Bình Province, Vietnam
- Kim Sơn, Bắc Giang, a village in northeastern Vietnam
- Kim Sơn (restaurant), a restaurant chain in Texas, United States
- Kim Sŏn, a minor lord of Korea's Goryeo Dynasty

== See also ==
- Kim Sơn (disambiguation)
