= Diocese of Phát Diệm =

Roman Catholic diocese in Vietnam

Diocese of Phát Diệm Dioecesis de Phat Diem Giáo phận Phát Diệm

catholic
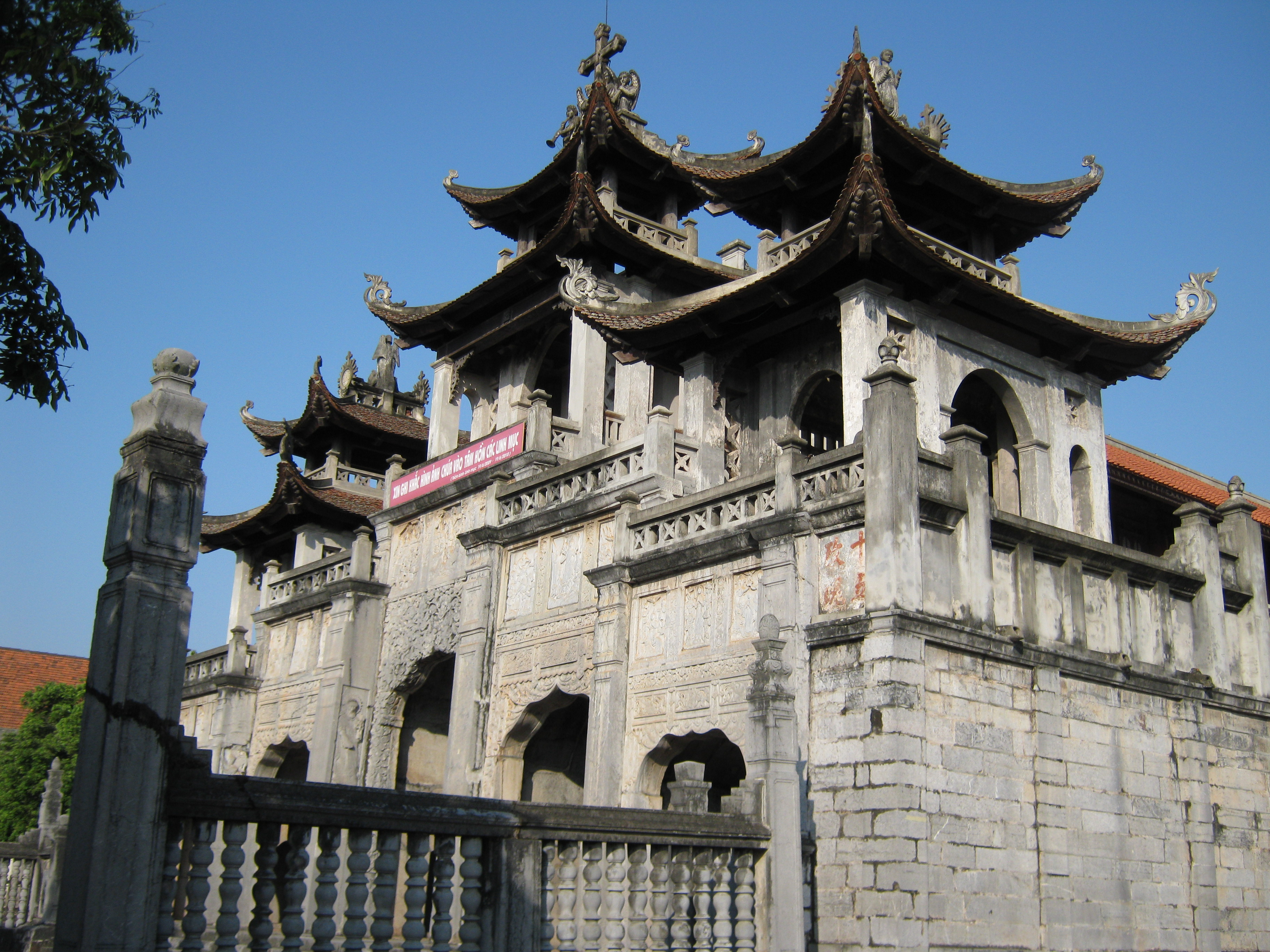
- Phát Diệm Cathedral

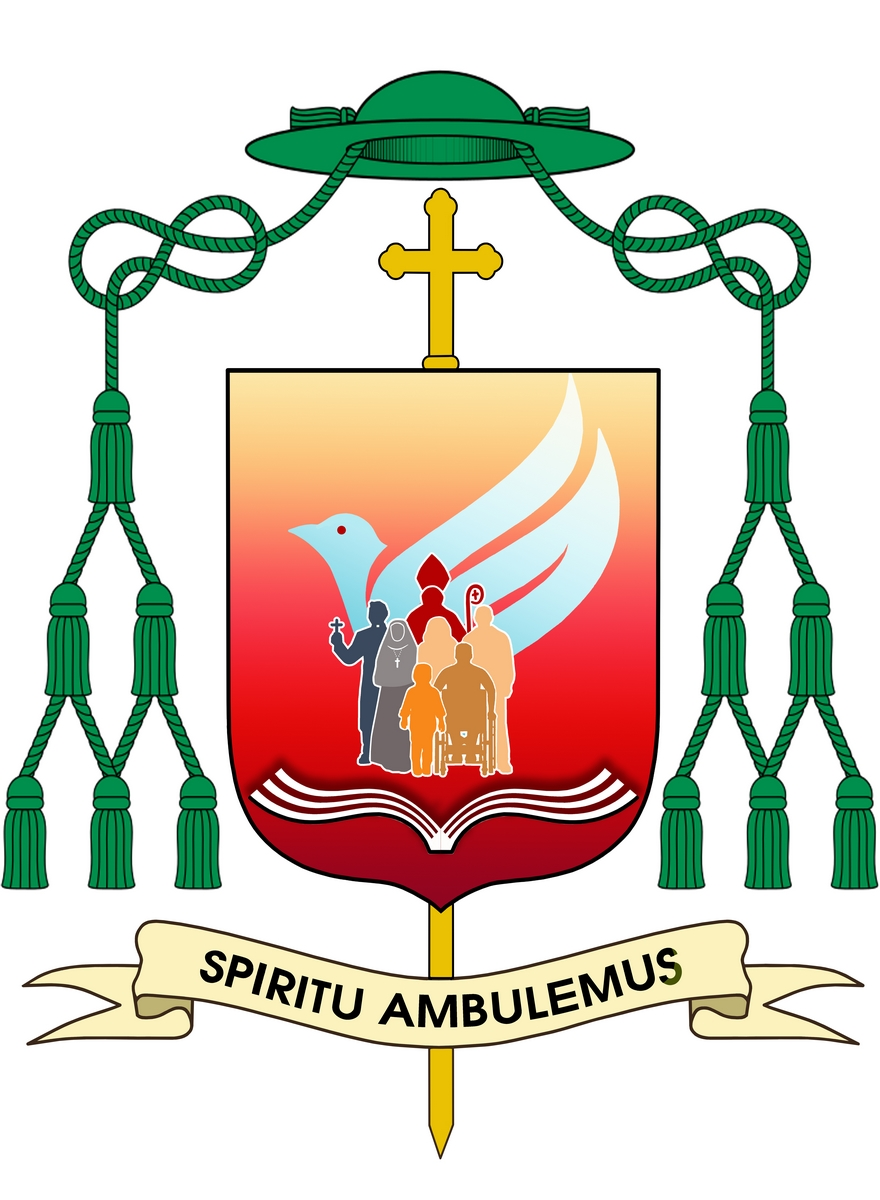
- Coat of arms of Bishop Tùng

Location
- Country: Vietnam
- Ecclesiastical province: Hà Nội
- Coordinates: 20°05′40″N 106°04′44″E

Statistics
- Area: 1,786 km^{2} (690 sq mi)
- Population: Total; Catholics: (as of 2022); 1,060,210; 161,550 (15.2%)
- Parishes: 79

Information
- Denomination: Roman Catholic
- Sui iuris church: Latin Church
- Rite: Roman Rite
- Established: 15 April 1901 (as Apostolic Vicariate of Central Tonking); 3 December 1924 (renamed as Apostolic Vicariate of Phát Diêm); 7 May 1932 (lost territory to establish Apostolic Vicariate of Thanh Hoá); 24 November 1960 (promoted as Diocese)
- Cathedral: Cathedral of the Queen of the Most Holy Rosary
- Patron saint: Saints Peter and Paul
- Secular priests: 136
- Language: Vietnamese

Current leadership
- Pope: Leo XIV
- Bishop: Peter Kiều Công Tùng
- Metropolitan Archbishop: Joseph Vũ Văn Thiên
- Bishops emeritus: Joseph Nguyễn Văn Yến

Website
- phatdiem.org

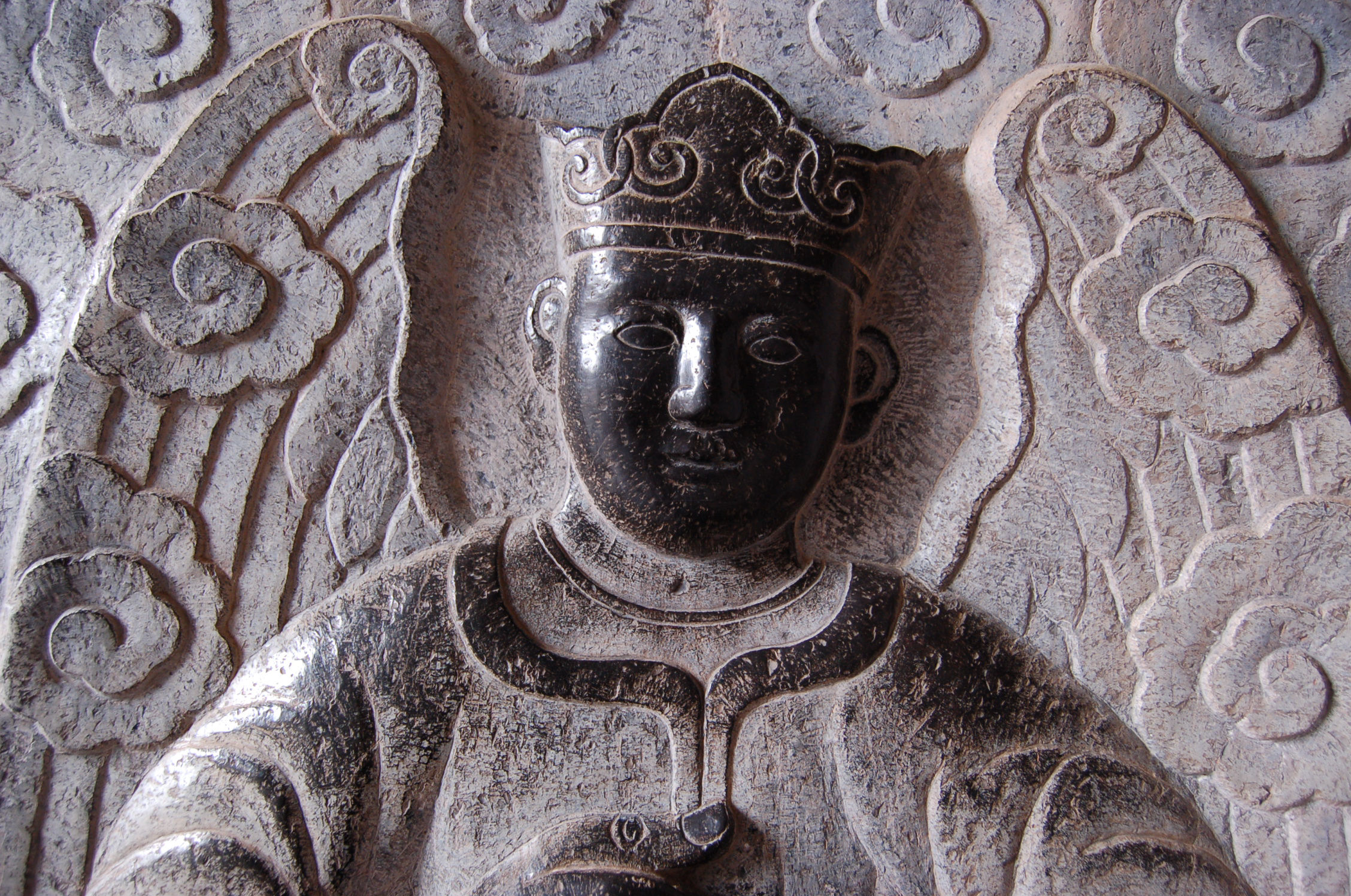
19th century stone angel in Phát Diêm Cathedral

The Diocese of Phát Diệm (Latin: Dioecesis de Phat Diem) is a Roman Catholic diocese of Vietnam.

The creation of the diocese in present form was declared November 24, 1960.

The diocese covers an area of 1,787 km², and is a suffragan diocese of the Archdiocese of Hanoi.

By 2004, the diocese of Phát Diêm had about 144,721 believers (15.9% of the population), 31 priests and 65 parishes.

Queen of the Rosary Cathedral in Kim Sơn District (Ninh Bình Province) has been assigned as the Cathedral of the diocese. This cathedral complex was built between 1875 and 1899 and comprises four churches and one basilica, as well as several parks, ponds and grottos.

== History ==
In the early 19th century, the entire Kim Sơn area was a swampy wasteland of mud and reeds created by river deposits. In 1828, Nguyễn Công Trứ was sent by the Huế court to the North to develop these new lands. He established the Tiền Hải district (Thái Bình province) and Kim Sơn district (Ninh Bình province). The name Phát Diệm first appeared in 1829, during the 10th year of Emperor Minh Mạng's reign, when the Kim Sơn district was founded.

It can be said that missionary work in Tonkin truly began when Father Alexandre de Rhodes and Father Marquez arrived in Cửa Bàng (now part of Ba Làng, Thanh Hóa) on the feast day of Saint Joseph, March 19, 1627. While waiting for permission to the capital, Thăng Long (now Hanoi), they preached at Vạn-nọ. Some believe this location was near the Thần Phù Gate, which today is known as the Hào Nho parish within the Phát Diệm diocese.

In 1659, the Holy See established two Apostolic Vicariates named Tonkin and Cochinchina. The first two apostolic Vicars were François Pallu and Lambert de la Motte, who were also founders of the Paris Foreign Missions Society. However, it was not until 1666 that the first priests of the Paris Foreign Missions Society actually arrived in Tonkin to begin the formal work of preaching the gospel.

In 1679, the Apostolic Vicariate of Tonkin was divided into East and West Tonkin. The territory of the modern-day Phát Diệm diocese fell under West Tonkin and was overseen by Bishop Jacques de Bourges. By 1712, the area that is now Phát Diệm already contained 34 churches and chapels serving a community of 4,540 faithful.

On March 27, 1846, the Apostolic Vicariate of Western Tonkin was again divided into Western and Southern Tonkin. Phát Diệm remained under Western Tonkin, overseen by Bishop Retord Liêu, with four parishes: Phúc Nhạc with 10,600 faithful, Yên Vân with 1,598, Bạch Bát with 3,482, and Đông Chùa with 4,000. In 1895, Western Tonkin was divided once more into Western Tonkin and Upper Tonkin. The land belonging to Phát Diệm remained part of the Western Diocese under the care of Bishop Gendreau Đông.

The Apostolic Vicariate of Phát Diệm was officially established on April 15, 1901, when Pope Leo XIII divided Western Tonkin into two parts: Western Tonkin (Hanoi) and a new Vicariate called Coastal Tonkin, comprising Ninh Bình and Thanh Hóa provinces. On December 3, 1924, it was renamed the Apostolic Vicariate of Phát Diệm. In 1932, the vicariate was divided to form the Apostolic Vicariate of Thanh Hóa.

On June 11, 1933, Pope Pius XI appointed Father Jean-Baptiste Nguyễn Bá Tòng to the position of Coadjutor Vicar Apostolic. Bishop Tòng then succeeded as Apostolic Vicar in 1935. His successor was Jean-Marie Phan Đình Phùng, followed by Thaddeus Lê Hữu Từ, who governed from 1945 until 1959. In 1957, Father Paul Bùi Chu Tạo assumed the role of Apostolic Administrator and was promoted to Apostolic Vicar in 1959.

On November 24, 1960, the Holy See elevated the vicariate to the status of a diocese. Bishop Paul Bùi Chu Tạo was the first diocesan bishop. He was succeeded by Joseph Nguyễn Văn Yến (1998–2007), Joseph Nguyễn Năng (2009–2019), and Peter Kiều Công Tùng (from 2023).

== Ordinaries ==
=== Vicar apostolic of Coastal Tonking (1901-1924) ===
| Vicar apostolic | | Period in office | Status | Reference |
|---|---|---|---|---|
| 1 | Bishop Jean-Pierre-Alexandre Marcou, M.E.P. | April 16, 1904 – December 03, 1924 | Remained as vicar apostolic of Phát Diệm. | |

=== Vicar apostolic of Phát Diệm (1924-1960) ===
| Vicar apostolic | | Period in office | Status | Reference |
|---|---|---|---|---|
| 1 | Bishop Jean-Pierre-Alexandre Marcou, M.E.P. | December 03, 1924 – September 03, 1935 | Resigned | |
| 2 | Bishop Jean-Baptiste Nguyễn Bá Tòng | September 03, 1935 – June 08, 1945 | Resigned | |
| 3 | Bishop Thaddeus Lê Hữu Từ, O. Cist. | June 14, 1945 – 1959 | Resigned | |
| 4 | Bishop Paul Bùi Chu Tạo | January 24, 1959 – November 24, 1960 | Remained as bishop of Phát Diệm. | |

=== Bishop of Phát Diêm (1960-present) ===
| Bishop | | Coat of Arms | Period in office | Status | Reference |
|---|---|---|---|---|---|
| 1 | Bishop Paul Bùi Chu Tạo | | November 24, 1960 – November 03, 1998 | Resigned | |
| 2 | Bishop Joseph Nguyễn Văn Yến | | November 03, 1998 – April 14, 2007 | Resigned | |
| 3 | Bishop Joseph Nguyễn Năng | | July 25, 2009 – October 19, 2019 | Transferred to Thành-Phô Hô Chí Minh. | |
| – | Archbishop Joseph Nguyễn Năng | | October 19, 2019 – March 25, 2023 | Apostolic Administrator | |
| 4 | Bishop Peter Kiều Công Tùng | | March 25, 2023 – present | Current bishop | |

Coadjutor Vicar Apostolic of Coastal Tonking (1917-1924)

| Coadjutor Vicar Apostolic | | Period in office | Reference |
|---|---|---|---|
| 1 | Bishop Louis-Christian-Marie de Cooman, M.E.P. | June 12, 1917 – December 03, 1924 | |

Coadjutor Vicar Apostolic of Phát Diêm (1924-1944)

| Coadjutor Vicar Apostolic | | Period in office | Reference |
|---|---|---|---|
| 1 | Bishop Jean-Baptiste Nguyễn Bá Tòng | January 10, 1933 – September 03, 1935 | |
| 2 | Bishop Jean-Marie Phan Ðình Phùng | May 28, 1940 – May 27, 1944 | |

Coadjutor Bishops of Phát Diêm (1963-1998)

| Coadjutor Bishop | | Coat of Arms | Period in office | Reference |
|---|---|---|---|---|
| 1 | Bishop Joseph Lê Qúy Thanh | | 1963 – May 07, 1974 | |
| 2 | Bishop Joseph Nguyễn thiện Khuyến | | December 09, 1976 – December 15, 1981 | |
| 3 | Bishop Joseph Nguyễn Văn Yến | | November 14, 1988 – November 03, 1998 | |
