= Thanh Hải =

Thanh Hải may refer to:

- Thanh Hải (poet)

Several places in Vietnam, including:

- Thanh Hải, Bình Thuận, a ward of Phan Thiết
- Thanh Hải, Bắc Giang, a commune of Lục Ngạn District
- Thanh Hải, Ninh Thuận, a commune of Ninh Hải District
- Thanh Hải, Hải Dương, a commune of Thanh Hà District
- Thanh Hải, Hà Nam, a commune of Thanh Liêm District
