= Phong Vân =

Phong Vân may refer to several places in Vietnam, including:

- Phong Vân, Hanoi, a rural commune of Ba Vì District
- Phong Vân, Bắc Giang, a rural commune of Lục Ngạn District
