= Phú Nhuận =

Phú Nhuận may refer to several places in Vietnam, including:

- Phú Nhuận, Ho Chi Minh City, ward in Ho Chi Minh City
- Phú Nhuận district, district in Ho Chi Minh City
- Phú Nhuận, Huế, a former ward of Thuận Hóa district. Now is Thuận Hóa ward of Municipality of Huế
- Phú Nhuận, Bến Tre, a former rural commune of Bến Tre. Now is An Hội ward of Vĩnh Long province
- Phú Nhuận, Bắc Giang, a former rural commune of Lạng Giang District. Now is Biển Động commune of Bắc Ninh
- Phú Nhuận, Lào Cai, a rural commune of Bảo Thắng District. Now is Tằng Loỏng commune of Lào Cai province
- Phú Nhuận, Thanh Hóa, a rural commune of Như Thanh District. Now is Mậu Lâm commune of Thanh Hóa province
- Phú Nhuận, Tiền Giang, a rural commune of Cai Lậy District. Now is Mỹ Thành commune of Đồng Tháp province
