= Podlužany =

Podlužany may refer to several places in Slovakia.

- Podlužany, Bánovce nad Bebravou District
- Podlužany, Levice District
