= Land reform in Rwanda =

The land reform in Rwanda have been characterised by a number of policy shifts from customary land tenure during the pre-colonial and post-colonial era characterised by unclear land rights and tenure insecurity. In 2009 there was a national program to make land reforms and redistribution programmes.

The 2019 National Land Policy is the current land policy, replacing the one of 2013. There has been a land tenure regularisation which saw 11.4 million land parcels registered in a process which took place since 2008 and operationalisation of the land administration information system.

== Institutional reforms ==
The institution in charge of land changed the appellation and its responsibilities over time, starting with the name change in late 2000 from NLC (National Land Centre) to RNRA (Rwanda Natural Resources Authority, then later to RLMUA (Rwanda Lands Management and Use Authority). In 2022, the National Land Authority (NLA) was established by the Presidential Order No. 030/01 of 6 May 2022. Its mandate is to manage and administer land in Rwanda, including implementing land policy, land use planning, land registration, land consolidation, and management of land conflicts. The agency is under the Ministry of Environment. In land use planning the major change in land policy was to shift from districts boundary based planning to sectoral and land suitability based planning and it defined how to secure land for strategic investment.

== Land disputes resolution ==
The NLA has been given the power to resolve land disputes relating to land boundaries and systematic land registration conducted between 2008 and 2013. The resolution of land disputes is regulated by Law No. 27/2021 of 10 June 2021 governing land, especially in Article 73 and in its last paragraph it provides the Ministerial Order No. 004/MOE/22 of 15 February 2022 determining modalities and procedures for resolution of disputes related to land boundaries and systematic land registration that was gazetted in the Official Gazette of Rwanda to implement the new land law, aiming to reduce the increase in land litigation in courts where Rwandan courts have been burdened by a great number of disputes concerning land.

== National land use and development master plans ==
The land uses are mainly directed with a comprehensive National Land use and development master plan 2020–2050, which characterised the hierarchy of cities and towns from the capital city, the satellite cities, the secondary cities, the district towns and a number of trading centres.

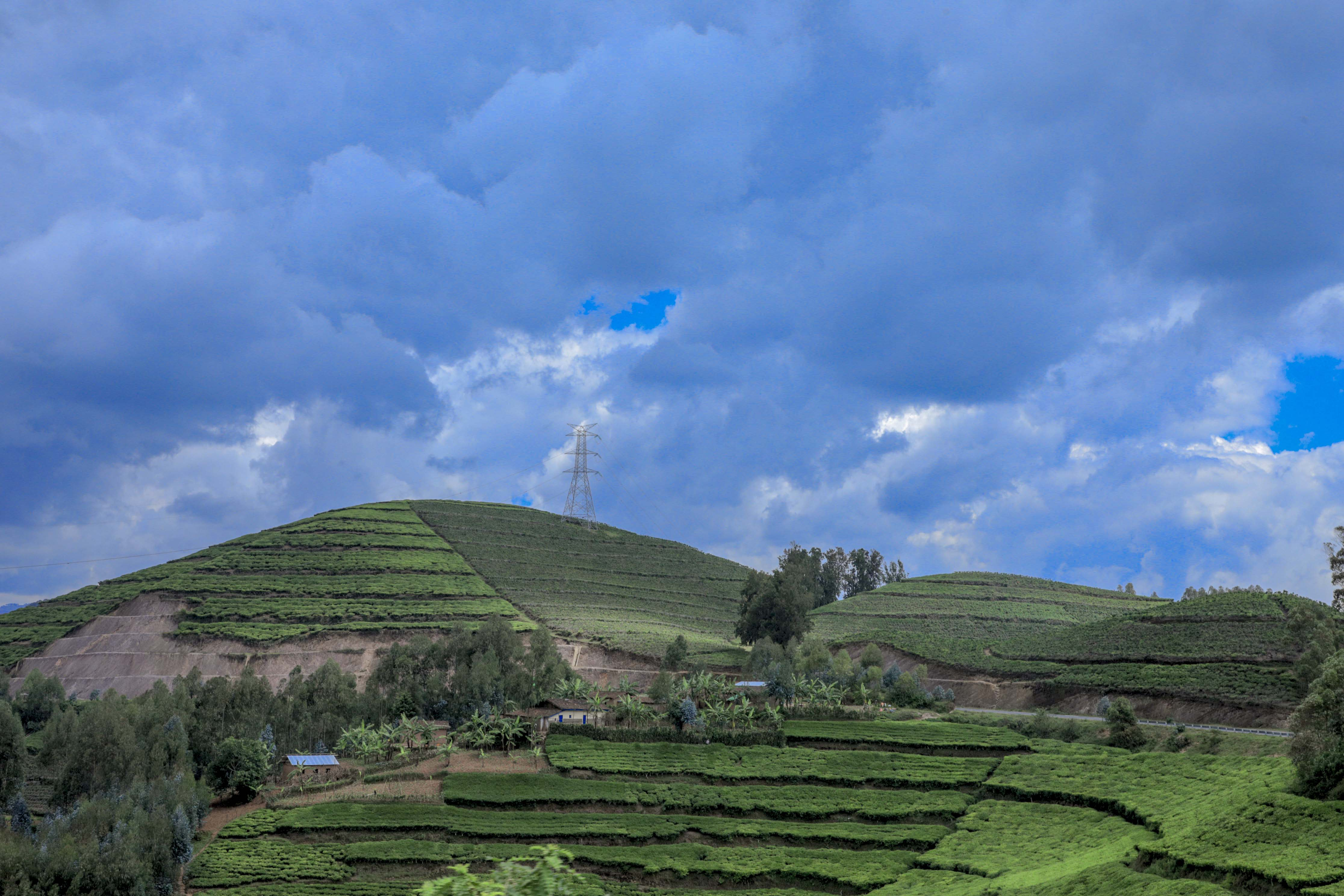
Agricultural land at Gatsibo

== Land tax reforms ==
In 2023 and 2024 there have been various land tax reforms on property tax and rates on land tax. The new rate applied on land tax is set to be 0 to 80 Rwandan francs per square metre from the initial rate of 300 francs.
