= Podlužany, Levice District =

Podlužany Berekalja
- Municipality
- Flag

- Location of Podlužany, Levice District in the Nitra Region Location of Podlužany, Levice District in Slovakia
- Coordinates: 48.25°N 18.01°E
- Country: Slovakia
- Region: Nitra Region
- District: Levice District
- First mentioned: 1275

Area
  - Total: 8.74 km^{2} (3.37 sq mi)
- Elevation: 174 m (571 ft)

Population (2025)
  - Total: 755
- Time zone: UTC+1 (CET)
  - Summer (DST): UTC+2 (CEST)
- Postal code: 935 27
- Area code: +421 36
- Vehicle registration plate (until 2022): LV
- Website: www.obec-podluzany.sk

Podlužany (Hungarian: Berekalja) is a village and municipality in the Levice District in the Nitra Region of Slovakia.

== Etymology ==
Slovak podlužane - people living near the riparian forest (luh). Podlusan 1275, Podlussany 1773, Podlužany 1808, Podlužany 1920.

== Web page ==
http://www.obec-podluzany.sk/

== History ==
The village was first mentioned in 1275 under the name Podlusan, when it belonged to the servants of the Tekov Castle. Some sources indicate that a chapel already stood on the site of the present church in 1255.

From 1388, Podlužany formed part of the estate of Levice Castle. By 1601, the village had an organized local self-government with its own administrative office.

From the 18th century, the settlement of Rýchňava was administratively part of Podlužany. Before the land consolidation of 1864, it belonged to Prince Esterházy, later to the landowners Schöller and the Dorr family. The settlement ceased to exist in the 1970s.

Historically, the inhabitants engaged mainly in agriculture, with linen weaving as a supplementary activity. A collective farm was established in 1949 and was later succeeded by the present agricultural cooperative. In the 1960s, greenhouses and a vegetable storage facility were built, and today the village hosts a major fruit and vegetable warehouse.

The local school was founded in 1807. In the 20th century, several public buildings were added, including the funeral house in the 1980s and the cultural centre, which also houses the municipal office and the library. The village was connected to the water supply and gas network in the 1990s, and work on a modern sewage system is currently being prepared.

== Geography ==
The municipality lies at an altitude of 174 metres (571 ft) and covers an area of 8.74 km^{2} (3.37 sq mi) (2025).

== Population ==
Population statistic (10 years)
Year	1995	2005	2015	2025
Count	784	748	772	755
Difference		−4.59%	+3.20%	−2.20%

Population statistic
Year	2024	2025
Count	759	755
Difference		−0.52%

It has a population of 755 people (31 December 2025).

=== Ethnicity ===
Census 2021 (1+ %)
Ethnicity	Number	Fraction
Slovak	748	97.9%
Not found out	13	1.7%
Total	764	

In year 2021 was 764 people by ethnicity 748 as Slovak, 13 as Not found out, 6 as Other, 4 as Hungarian, 3 as Czech, 2 as German and 1 as Russian.

Note on population: The difference values of population numbers in the table "Population statistic" and in the sections "Ethnicity" & "Religion" is caused by the use of various statistical methods.

Slovak is the predominant language used in everyday life, local administration, and education.

=== Religion ===
Census 2021 (1+ %)
Religion	Number	Fraction
Roman Catholic Church	572	74.87%
None	142	18.59%
Evangelical Church	21	2.75%
Not found out	13	1.7%
Total	764	

In year 2021 was 764 people by religion 572 from Roman Catholic Church, 142 from None, 21 from Evangelical Church, 13 from Not found out, 5 from Greek Catholic Church, 3 from Other, 3 from Ad hoc movements, 2 from Calvinist Church, 1 from Old Catholic Church, 1 from Other and not ascertained christian church and 1 from Buddhism.

== Facilities ==
The village has a public library and football pitch. In addition, Podlužany has a cultural centre that hosts community events and houses the municipal office.
