= Phát Diệm Cathedral =

Phát Diệm Cathedral Nhà thờ chính tòa Phát Diệm
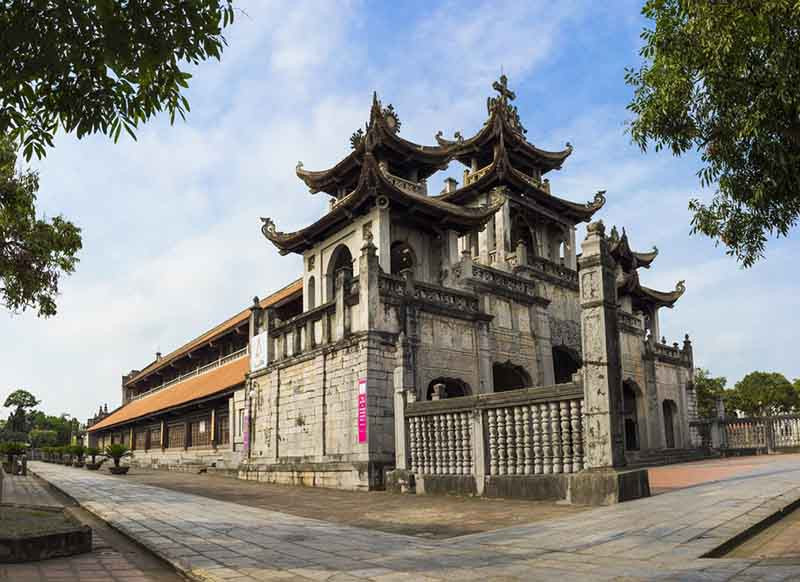
- Phát Diệm Cathedral
- Phát Diệm Cathedral; Nhà thờ chính tòa Phát Diệm
- 20°05′34″N 106°04′46″E
- Location: Kim Sơn District, Ninh Bình Province
- Country: Vietnam
- Denomination: Roman Catholic
- Website: https://www.nhathoda.net/

History
- Status: Cathedral
- Consecrated: 1891

Architecture
- Functional status: Active
- Style: Vietnamese-Gothic eclecticism
- Groundbreaking: 1875
- Completed: 1891

Administration
- Diocese: Phát Diệm

The Phát Diệm Cathedral (Vietnamese: Nhà thờ chính tòa Phát Diệm) is the seat of the Roman Catholic Diocese of Phát Diệm, located in Kim Sơn District of Ninh Bình Province in Vietnam. The architecture of the church – built in stone and wood in 1891 – is an eclectic blend of Vietnamese and European architectural styles. It was mainly built in traditional Vietnamese architecture, similar to historical palaces and temples. It was bombed in 1972 and subsequently restored. Complementing the cathedral, the Phat Diem complex includes five chapels, three grottoes, a memorial house, and a recently constructed pastoral center for the diocese.

== Location ==
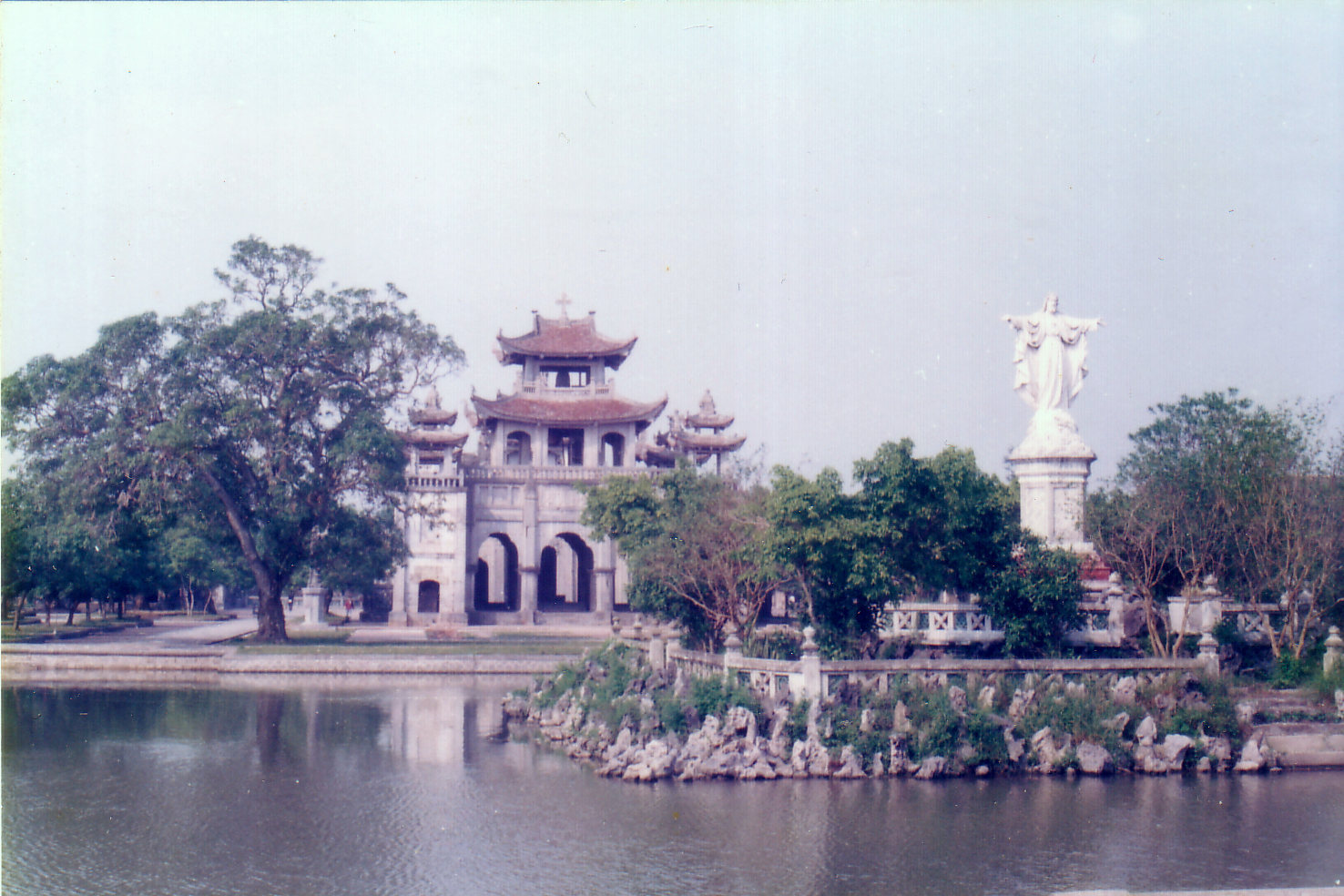
Complete view of the cathedral's bell tower

The cathedral is located in Phát Diệm township of Kim Sơn District in Ninh Bình Province. It is about 29 km southeast of Ninh Binh and 121 kilometres (75 mi) from Hanoi.

== History ==
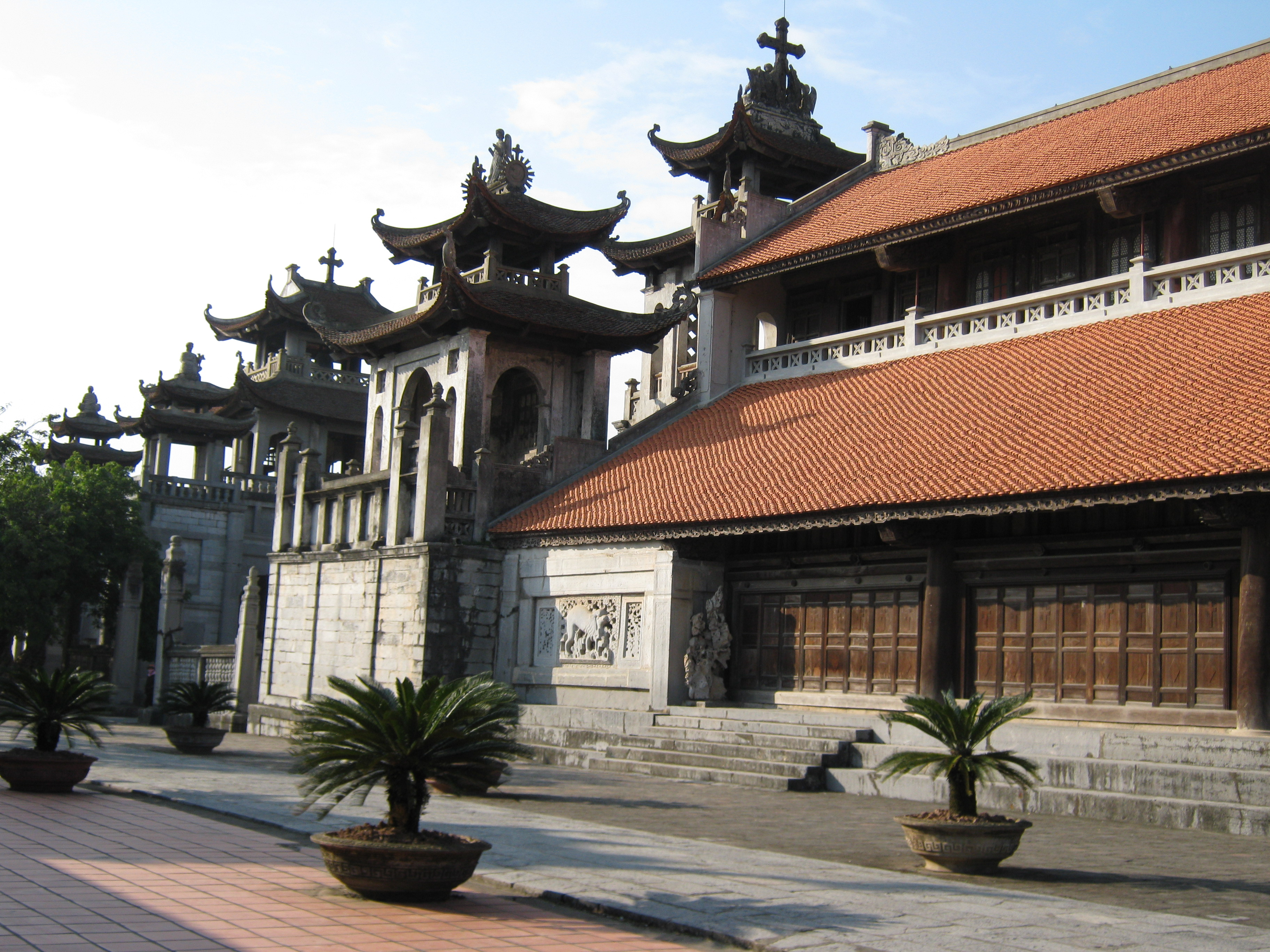
Side view of the cathedral

Phát Diệm Cathedral was built by the priest Father Trần Lục (Père Six in French, or cụ Sáu in Vietnamese). Père Six's tomb is in the frontyard of the cathedral. The wooden statues in the cathedral were all carved by Pho Gia, a Vietnamese artisan. The novelist Graham Greene described the cathedral as "more Buddhist than Christian" in his novel the Quiet American.

After the 1954 Geneva Conference, many of its parishioners and clergy moved to safer places in South Vietnam. The cathedral is still functioning as a place of worship, and there are many more churches in the district.

On 15 August 1972, the cathedral was bombed, resulting in the collapse of its entire west wall, the convents and two of the schools. But now, after restoration, there are not even tell-tale marks of this destruction.

== Features ==
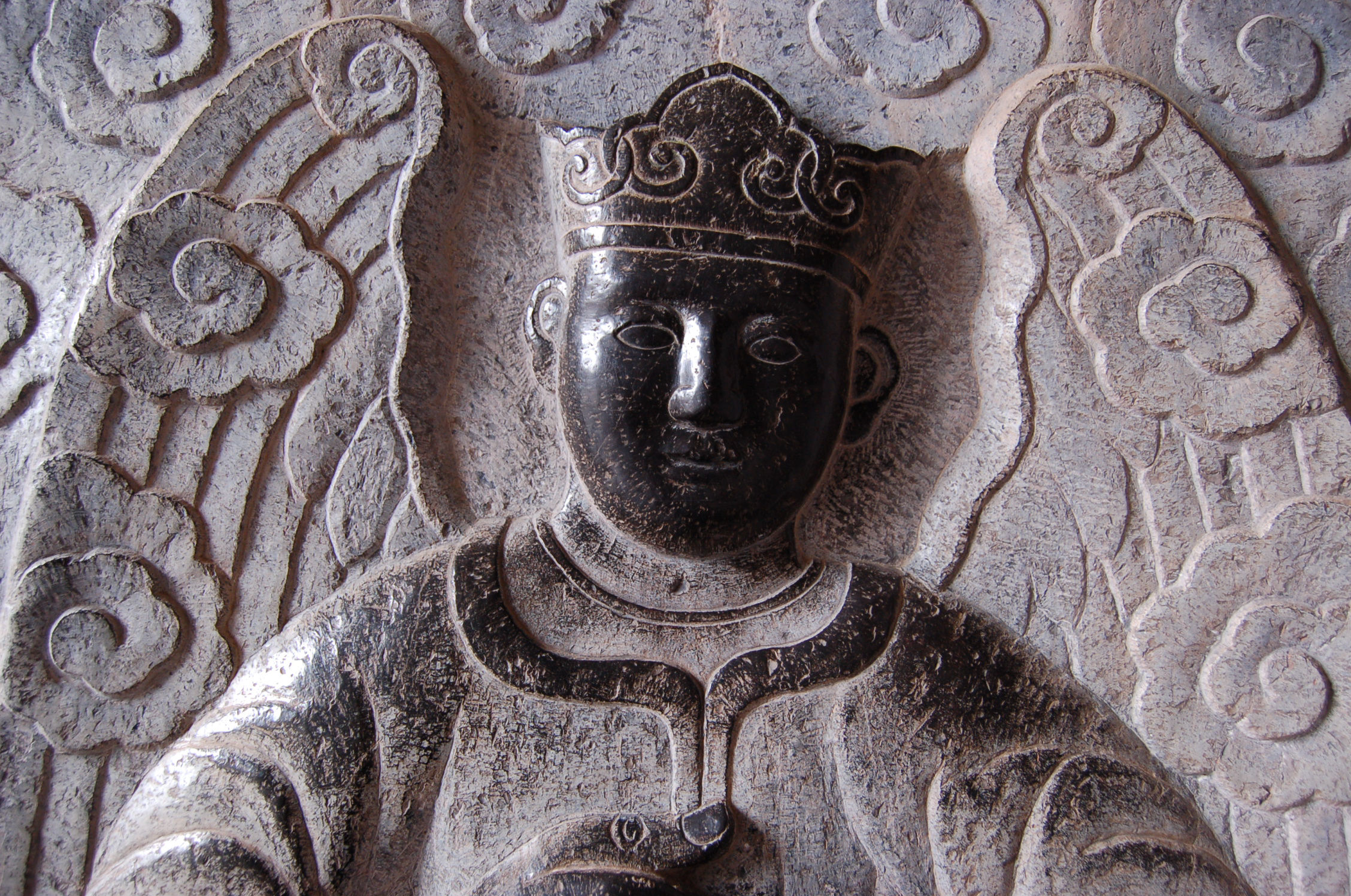
An angel carved in stone

The cathedral, a towering stone edifice, was built in 1891 in the Vietnamese style, blended with stone walls built in European neo-Gothic style. To test the foundation condition of the cathedral site in a boggy area, Father Six had created a mound of limestone boulders and found the conditions not to be suitable to build it. It is decorated with box-type cupolas (domes) with "upturned tiled roofs", which are like pagodas. Père Six, who built it, was particular to haul the sand stones to build the cathedral from quarry a distance of more than 200 kilometres (120 mi) away. The eclectic design of the cathedral appears as if the pagodas "had been dropped into the towers of a Gothic church."

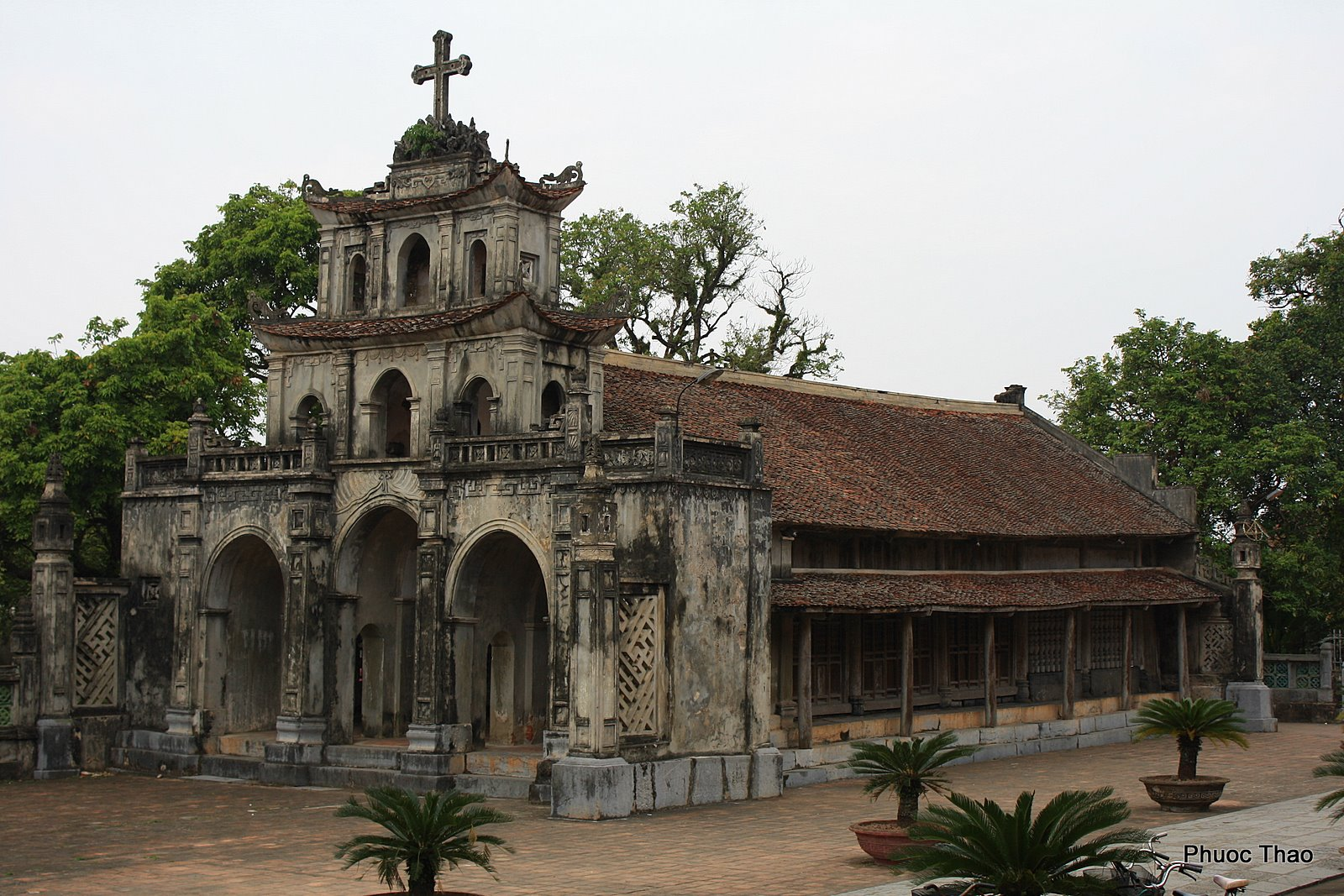
St. Peter's Chapel

The overall size of the cathedral is 210 feet (64 m) in length, with a width of 60 feet (18 m). The nave of the cathedral is built over 52 pillars, of which 16 are 11 metres (36 ft) tall, carved from large ironwood trees. In the front worship area, the altar is made of a single slab, ornamented in "orthodox-style" and is made of "lacquered and gilded woodwork". Above the altar, there are portrait paintings of about 30 missionaries, most of European origin. The vaulted ceiling has paintings of angels in Vietnamese style. The interior walls are decorated with Catholic iconography, but particularly have paintings of Eastern religious symbols like dragons, unicorns, tortoises and phoenixes.

== Other buildings in the complex ==
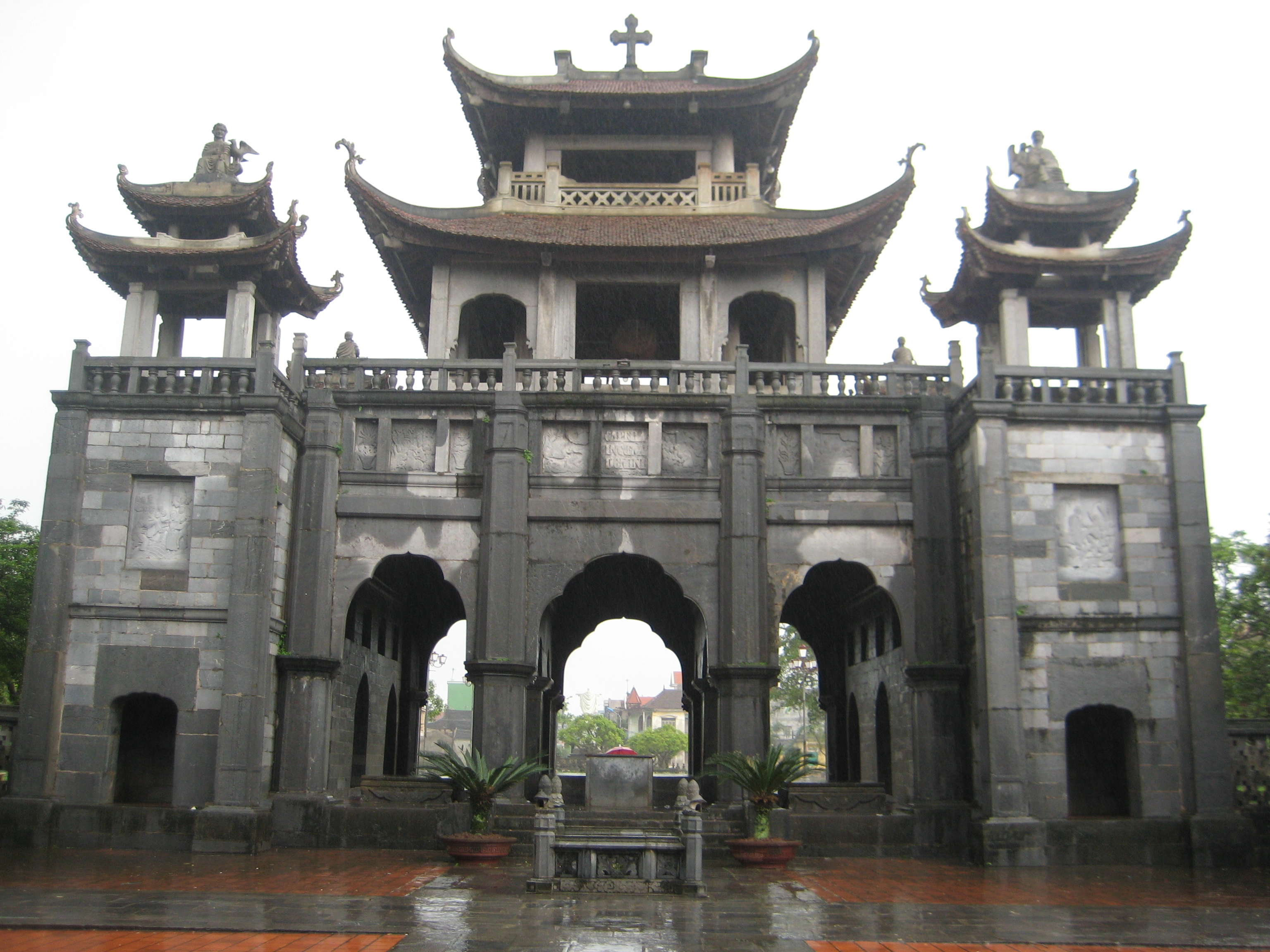
Square Hall, the bell tower

Apart from the cathedral church, the episcopal residential and pastoral center buildings, there are other structures in the complex, including a stone chapel which looks like a tomb and an elegant bell tower in front of the cathedral. This entire complex is spread over an area of 15 acres (6.1 ha). The two-tonne bronze bell in the bell tower was hauled up over a ramp made of earth. A climb to the top of the bell tower provides a complete scenic view of the town. There is a platform in front the bell tower made of two layers of very large stone slabs. The platform was used by mandarins to watch proceedings of the ritual Mass conducted in the cathedral. The earth from the ramp, which was used for hauling the bell and other metal objects, was spread around the cathedral, rising the height of the ground by 1 metre (3 ft 3 in). The small chapel is built with large carved stone blocks, and the interior is cool like a cave. A white statue of the Sacred Heart is installed in a small lake in front of the cathedral. Near the cathedral complex there is 19th-century covered bridge built with stones.

- The Square Hall (built in 1899), originally functioned as a place of Eucharistic adoration, also as the bell tower
- The Chapel of Immaculate Heart of Mary (1883), completely in stone
- The Chapel of Sacred Heart of Jesus (1889)
- The Chapel of Saint Roch (1895)
- The Chapel of Saint Joseph (1896)
- The Chapel of Saint Peter (1896)

== Bibliography ==
- Broyles, William (2013). Goodbye Vietnam. Open Road Media. ISBN 978-1-4804-0433-5.
- Greene, Graham (2010). The Quiet American. Random House. ISBN 978-1-4090-1740-0.
- Guides, Insight (2015). Insight Guides: Vietnam. APA. ISBN 978-1-78005-537-4.
- Keith, Charles (2012). Catholic Vietnam: A Church from Empire to Nation. University of California Press. ISBN 978-0-520-27247-7.
- Lưu, Minh trị (2000). Historical remains & beautiful places of Hanoi and the surrounding areas. Nhà xuá̂t bản Hà Nội.
- Ray, Nick; Yanagihara, Wendy (2005). Vietnam. Lonely Planet. ISBN 978-1-74059-677-0.
- Sasges, Gerard, ed. (2013). It's a Living: Work and Life in Vietnam Today. NUS Press. ISBN 978-9971-69-698-6.
- Welch, Larry (2015). School Days in Vietnam Stories from the Heart. Trafford Publishing. ISBN 978-1-4907-6066-7.
