= Hữu Mai =

Vietnamese writer

Hữu Mai (7 May 1926 – 2007) was a Vietnamese writer. He was born in Thanh Hóa and wrote the memoirs of Võ Nguyên Giáp.
