= Land consolidation =

Rearrangement of fragmented land parcels and their ownership to form larger land holdings

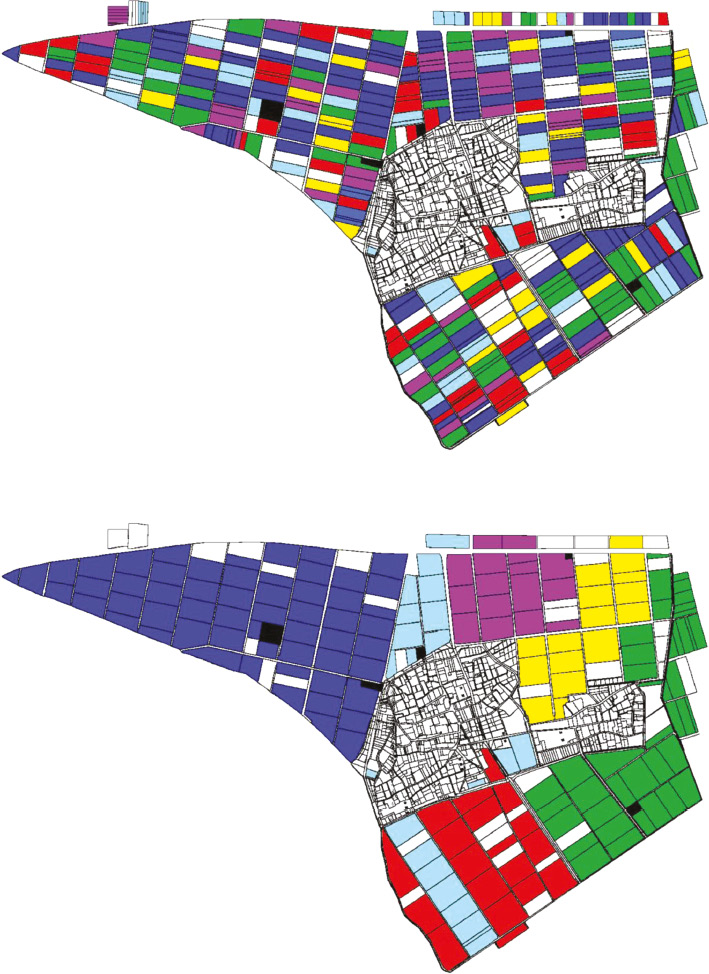
Map of a land consolidation process, with each color representing the holdings of different cultivators before (above image) and after (below image) the process

Land consolidation is a planned readjustment and rearrangement of fragmented land parcels and their ownership. It is usually applied to form larger and more rational land holdings. Land consolidation can be used to improve rural infrastructure and to implement developmental and environmental policies (improving environmental sustainability and agriculture).

== History ==
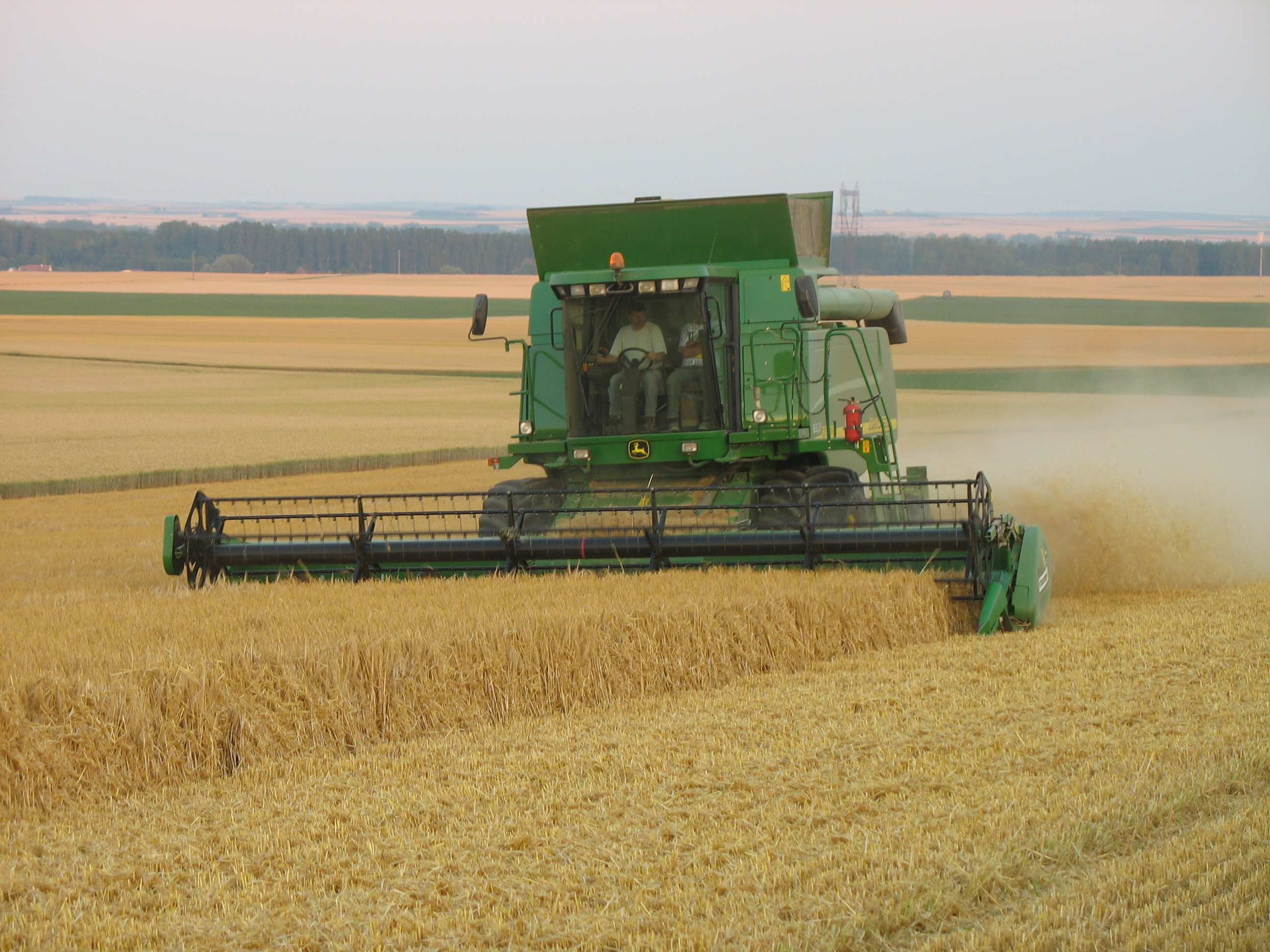
Land consolidation permits the more efficient use of mechanization, such as combine harvesters.

Land consolidation has existed in Europe for many centuries. In France, the first modern land consolidation took place in Rouvres-en-Plaine in 1707. The practice of private land consolidation began to be visible in the Paris Basin during the nineteenth century. Subsequently, it was usually done with the support of the public authorities. A law of 16 June 1824 authorized the exchange of land between individuals in order to fight against the fragmentation of agricultural parcels and to improve productivity. The concept spread more widely in Europe and the USA in the early 20th century. In the Netherlands the first land consolidation was in 1916 when 3659 plots were reduced to 500. In 1919, however, a further attempt to reduce fragmentation broke down against the opposition of one of the owners. This led to the Land Consolidation Act in 1924 which permitted land consolidation to continue without the cooperation of a small number of the owners. In Spain legal provision on land consolidation was not promulgated until December 20, 1952, but it was enthusiastically received by farmers. Similarly, in Germany legislation was passed in the 1950s as part of an overhaul of German agriculture. Land consolidation, known as Flurbereinigung, made possible landscapes being reshaped, for example with respect to construction of access roads. The process particularly benefitted the wine industry.

Following the collapse of communism in the former Soviet Union and Eastern bloc countries of Europe in 1991, state farms were frequently divided into fragmented parcels. Land was often returned to former owners who, by this time, were elderly, or given in joint ownership to heirs of an original owner. This resulted in a large number of absentee landowners residing in urban areas. In other cases, decollectivization resulted in households receiving several fragmented parcels of different qualities of arable land. Thus the need for consolidation was quickly recognised.

== Different approaches ==
More recently there have been attempts to promote land consolidation in developing countries. Approaches used include increasing the average size of farms into viable commercial units through sale or lease; consolidation to reduce fragmentation of smallholder plots; and cooperative farming, where farmers retain ownership of their land but farm it jointly. China has been particularly active in promoting consolidation, which involves issuance of land certificates that confirm a person’s entitlement to land, thus permitting sale and lease of land rights. To facilitate the process, land transfer service centers have been set up by local governments to collect information on who is looking to lease out; provide potential clients with information on location, area, major land characteristics, and suggested price of land to be leased out; prepare a formal land contract; and be responsible for contract dispute mediation.

In many countries individual smallholders’ land is distributed among many small fragments. This increases production costs by requiring time for farmers to move between fragments and makes use of machinery almost impossible. A response to this is to restructure land holdings while ensuring that farmers retain the same amount of land. In Uttar Pradesh in India a government program led to field boundaries being straightened and land areas as much as possible being reshaped in rectangular form. This improved ease of cultivation, particularly plowing, and lessened disputes due to unclear border demarcations and encroachments. In the Dinh Hoa commune of Vietnam, land consolidation has also been carried out in order to reduce the number of plots owned by individual farm households, thereby increasing the average size of a plot without changing the total farmland area of each household. This is done with the involvement of the local government and the smallholders. The move has resulted in reduced labour costs and increased mechanization, and has also permitted some restructuring of irrigation systems.

== Difficulties ==
Successful consolidation has to overcome competing interests of the farmers. There may be objections regarding the initial inventory of ownership, the boundaries between land, and the value attached to different parcels. Consolidation cannot simply involve re-allocating land while ensuring that everyone gets the same amount, as the quality of the land re-allocated has to be taken into account and an owner should not be worse off after consolidation than before. Consolidation programs should aim at ensuring that an owner’s holding after consolidation is equal in value to the original holding; if the value of the holding is less it may sometimes be necessary to pay financial compensation. However, soil quality is not the only factor in valuation as the value of a parcel can be affected by its position relative to roads, water supply, farm buildings and farmers' homes, as well as the value of trees or vines already planted on the land. Mediation arrangements to resolve these problems are essential. It is important to include respected farmers in the land valuation teams together with valuation experts.

== See also ==
- Enclosure
- Flurbereinigung (Germany)
- Land reform
- Sustainable agriculture
- Sustainable living
- Chak Bandi (Punjabi)
