= Thaddeus Lê Hữu Từ =

Catholic prelate (1896–1967)

The Most Reverend Thaddeus Anselmus Lê Hữu Từ O.Cist.
- Vicar Apostolic of Phát Diệm
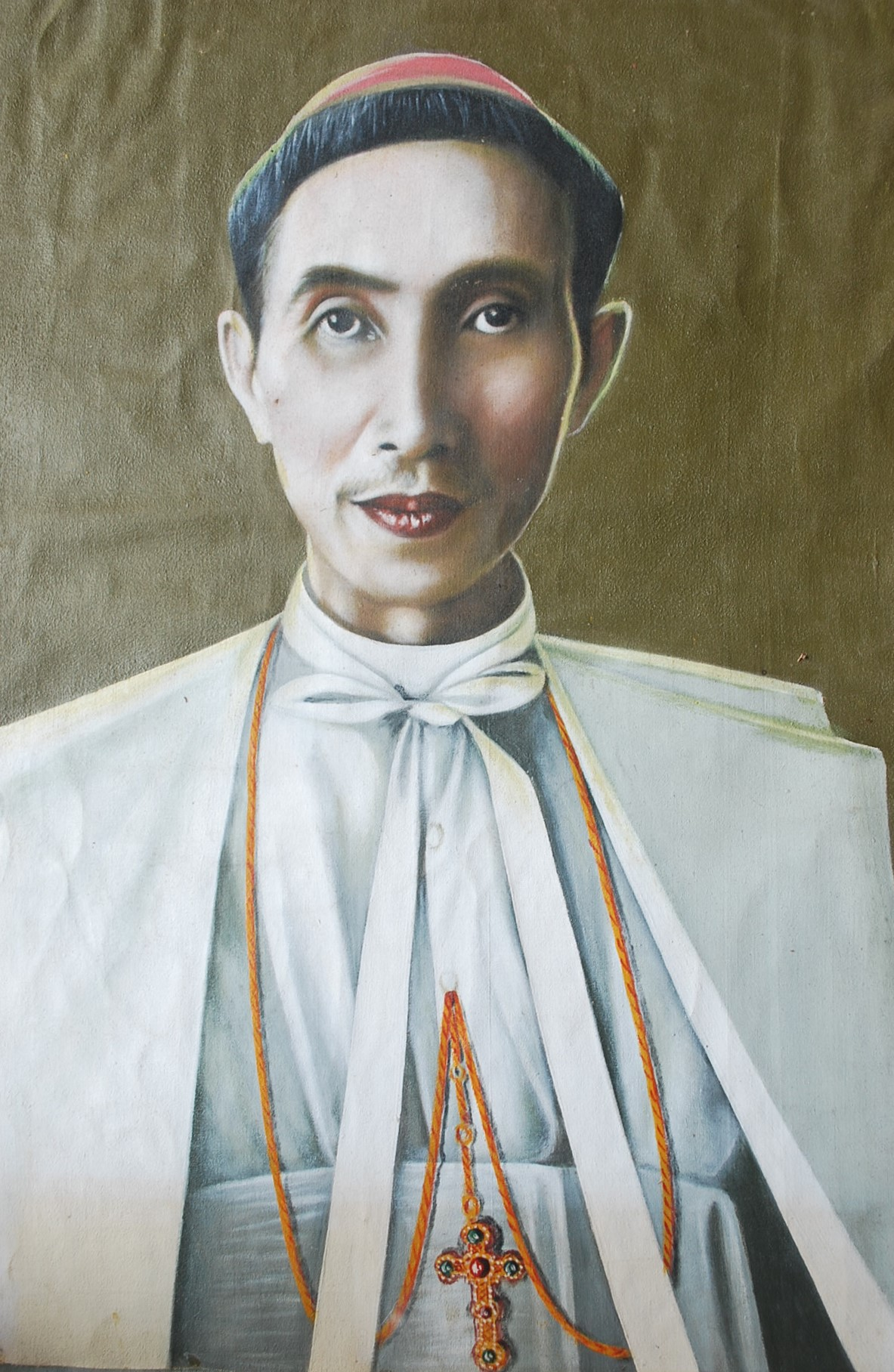
- Native name: Lê Hữu Từ
- Diocese: Phát Diệm
- See: Daphnusia
- Appointed: 11 July 1945
- Installed: 1 November 1945
- Term ended: 1959
- Predecessor: Jean Maria Phan Đình Phùng
- Successor: Paul Bùi Chu Tạo
- Other posts: Titular Bishop of Daphnusia (1945–1967); Apostolic Administrator of Bùi Chu (1948–1950); Supreme Advisor to the Government of the Democratic Republic of Vietnam (c. 20 January-c. 19 December 1946)
- Previous post: Prior of Châu Sơn (1936–1945)

Orders
- Ordination: 22 December 1928
- Consecration: 29 October 1945

Personal details
- Born: 28 October 1896 Di Loan, Vĩnh Linh, Quảng Trị, Annam, French Indochina
- Died: 24 April 1967 (aged 70) Gò Vấp, Saigon, South Vietnam
- Motto: Vox clamantis in deserto (A voice of one crying in the desert)

Styles of Thaddeus Anselm Lê Hữu Từ
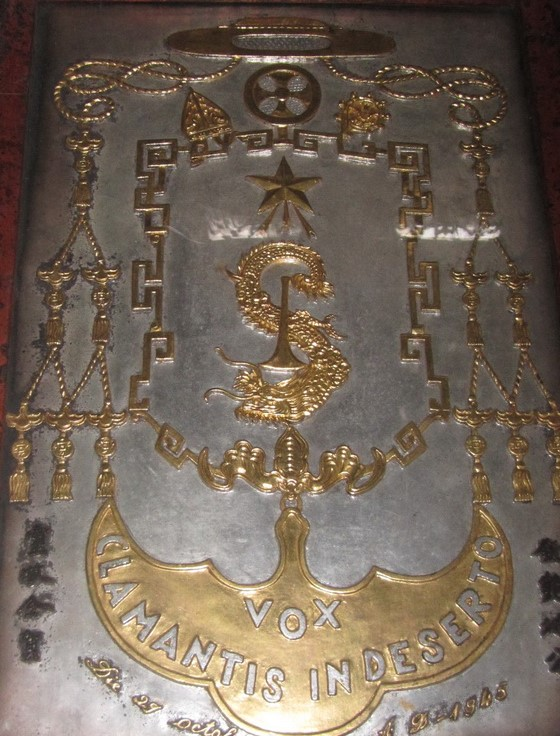
- Spoken style: Your Excellency
- Religious style: Bishop

Ordination history of Thaddeus Lê Hữu Từ
History
Episcopal consecration
- Principal consecrator: Jean-Baptiste Nguyễn Bá Tòng
- Co-consecrators: Dominique Hồ Ngọc Cẩn

Thaddeus Anselmus Lê Hữu Từ (28 October 1896 – 24 April 1967) was a Vietnamese Catholic prelate who served as the Apostolic Vicar of Phát Diệm from 1945 to 1959.

Từ was a supreme advisor to the early government of the Democratic Republic of Vietnam. As a leading Vietnamese Catholic nationalist figure during the First Indochina War, he was an ardent opponent of both French colonialism and Vietnamese communism. As a leader of the Northern Catholic faction, one of the 'Big Five' groups that accommodated themselves to the State of Vietnam, Từ urged Bảo Đại to grant Vietnam a constitution during the 1953 crisis, a period that demanded greater national autonomy from France.
