= Thanh Hải (poet) =

Vietnamese poet

- Born: Phạm Bá Ngoãn; 4 November 1930; Phong Điền District, Thừa Thiên Huế, Vietnam
- Died: December 15, 1980 (aged 50); Huế
- Occupation: Poet
- Writing career
- Pen name: Thanh Hải
- Notable awards: State Award of Arts and Literature (2nd time, year 2000, bestowed posthumously); Nguyễn Đình Chiểu Literature Award

Phạm Bá Ngoãn, pen name Thanh Hải (1930–1980) was a modern Vietnamese poet. His pen name "Thanh Hải" literally means "Blue Sea" in classical Sino-Vietnamese.

== Biography ==
Ngoãn was born on 4 November 1930 in Phong Bình Commune, Phong Điền District, Thừa Thiên–Huế Province. He was descended from a poor intelligentsia family. His father was a teacher, and his mother was a farmer. Thanh Hải attended local schools through his childhood. When Thanh Hải was 17, he took part in revolutionary movements at Hương Thủy District, and became the commissar of a cultural and artistic troupe. During the 1954-1964 period, Thanh Hải took part in revolutionary movements in his native province, became a provincial propaganda and instruction cadre.

During the 1964-1967 period, he was in charge of the Cờ Giải phóng (Flag of Liberation) newspaper of Huế city. Then he became a member of the Committee of Association of Vietnamese Writers, vice-president of Bình Trị Thiên Liberation Letters and Arts Branch.

After 1975, Thanh Hải became Secretary-general of Association of Bình-Trị-Thiên's Writers, member of the standing committee of Union of Vietnamese Arts and Literature.

Thanh Hải died because of cirrhosis on 15 December 1980 at Huế city.

== Works ==
- Những đồng chí trung kiên ("Faithful Comrades" 1962)
- Huế mùa xuân (vol.1 - 1970, vol.2 - 1975)
- Dấu võng Trường Sơn (1977)
- Mùa xuân nho nhỏ (11/1980)
- Mưa xuân đất này (1982)
- Thanh Hải thơ tuyển (1982)

== Comments on Thanh Hải ==
The literature researcher Trần Hữu Tá wrote:

Cuộc đấu tranh bền bỉ, anh dũng của nhân dân miền Nam, của nhân dân Thừa Thiên, là nguồn cảm hứng chủ yếu của thơ Thanh Hải. Sau năm 1975, thơ ông càng chín hơn. Bài "Mùa xuân nho nhỏ" (1980, làm trên giường bệnh trước khi mất không lâu) là thành công tiêu biểu hơn cả. Nói chung, thơ ông chân chất, bình dị, đôn hậu và chân thành. Tuy nhiên, ông ít đổi mới trong phong cách, nhiều khi có hiện tượng tự lập lại mình. Đối với nền thơ chống Mỹ của miền Nam, Thanh Hải là một trong những cây bút có nhiều đóng góp...

— Trần Hữu Tá

Translation:

The enduring and heroic struggle of the people of the South, of the people of Thừa Thiên, is the source of inspiration of Thanh Hải. After 1975, his poems became more matured. The poem "Mùa xuân nho nhỏ" (1980, made on his sickbed shortly before his death) is his most notable success.
In general, his poems are heartfelt, unstudied, honest and sincere. However, he rarely innovated his style, sometimes he repeated his past self. Toward the anti-US poetry of South Vietnam, Thanh Hải is one of the writer who have many contributions...

== Awards ==
- Nguyễn Đình Chiểu Literature Prize (1965)
- State Prize of Arts and Literature (đợt 2, year 2000, bestowed posthumously)
- 1st Prize of Poetry Competition of Thống nhất newsweekly (1959).
- 2nd Prize of Poetry Competition of Thống nhất newsweekly (1962).
