= Định Hóa, Thái Nguyên =

Định Hóa
- Location within Vietnam
- Coordinates: 21°54′25″N 105°38′32″E
- Country: Vietnam
- Region: Northeast
- Province: Thái Nguyên
- Time zone: UTC+7 (UTC + 7)

Định Hóa is the commune of Thái Nguyên Province, Vietnam.

In June 2025, Định Hóa Commune was established through the merger of the entire natural area and population of Chợ Chu Township (natural area: 13.99 km²; population: 11,953), Phúc Chu Commune (natural area: 12.90 km²; population: 2,731), Bảo Linh Commune (natural area: 27.88 km²; population: 2,637), and Đồng Thịnh Commune (natural area: 12.53 km²; population: 5,012) of Định Hóa District.
