= Định Hóa district =

Định Hóa District Huyện Định Hóa
- District
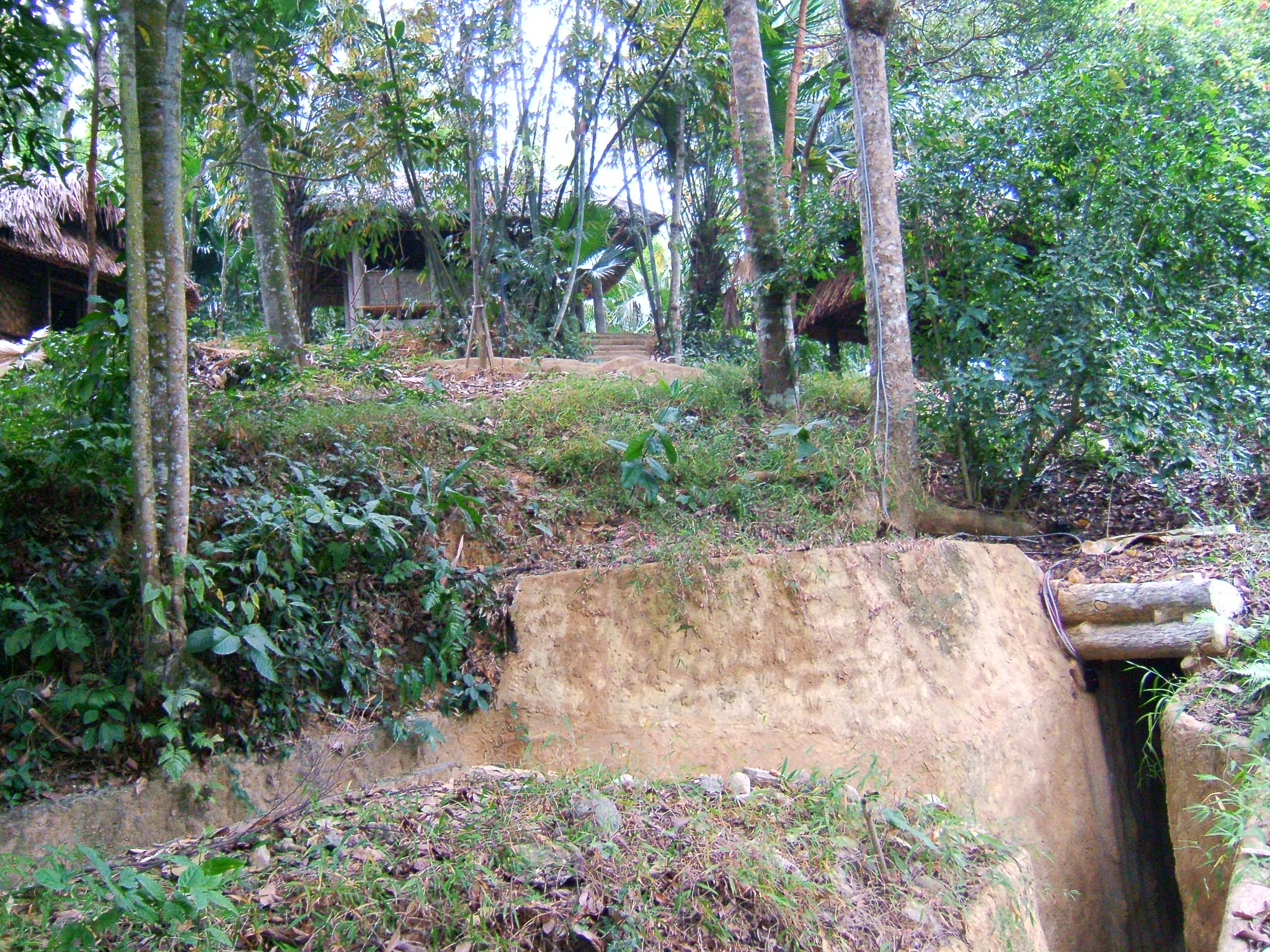

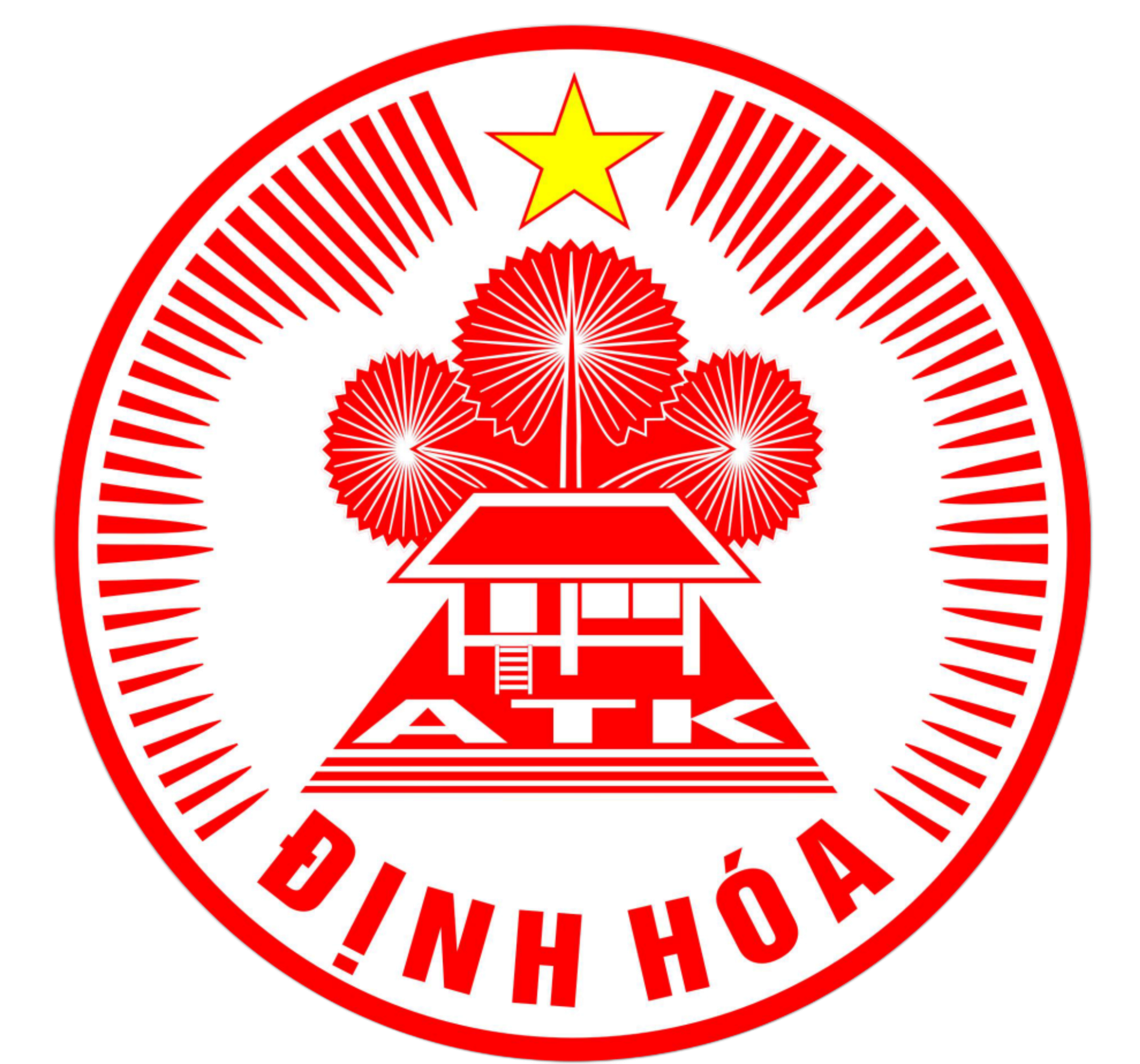
- Seal

- Location within Vietnam
- Coordinates: 21°53′50″N 105°38′01″E
- Country: Vietnam
- Region: Northeast
- Province: Thái Nguyên
- Capital: Chợ Chu

Government
  - Chairman of the People's Council: Lương Văn Lành
  - Chairman of the People's Committee: Ma Đình Đối

Area
  - District: 201 sq mi (521 km^{2})

Population (2003)
  - District: 90,086
  - Urban: 6,526 people (7.3%)
- Time zone: UTC+7 (UTC + 7)
- Website: dinhhoa.thainguyen.gov.vn

Định Hóa is a former rural district of Thái Nguyên province in the Northeast region of Vietnam. As of 2003 the district had a population of 90,086. The district covers an area of 521 km^{2}. The district capital lies at Chợ Chu.

== Administrative divisions ==
Chợ Chu, Bảo Cường, Bảo Linh, Bình Thành, Bình Yên, Bộc Nhiêu, Điềm Mặc, Định Biên, Đồng Thịnh, Kim Phượng, Kim Sơn, Lam Vỹ, Linh Thông, Phú Đình, Phú Tiến, Phúc Chu, Phượng Tiến, Quy Kỳ, Sơn Phú, Tân Dương, Tân Thịnh, Thanh Định, Trung Hội, Trung Lương.

== Climate ==
Climate data for Định Hóa, elevation 220 m (720 ft)
Month	Jan	Feb	Mar	Apr	May	Jun	Jul	Aug	Sep	Oct	Nov	Dec	Year
Record high °C (°F)	31.4 (88.5)	36.8 (98.2)	36.8 (98.2)	39.9 (103.8)	41.6 (106.9)	40.1 (104.2)	39.0 (102.2)	38.9 (102.0)	38.2 (100.8)	35.0 (95.0)	34.1 (93.4)	32.5 (90.5)	41.6 (106.9)
Mean daily maximum °C (°F)	19.4 (66.9)	20.5 (68.9)	23.3 (73.9)	27.4 (81.3)	31.5 (88.7)	32.7 (90.9)	32.7 (90.9)	32.6 (90.7)	31.7 (89.1)	29.1 (84.4)	25.5 (77.9)	21.8 (71.2)	27.3 (81.1)
Daily mean °C (°F)	15.4 (59.7)	17.0 (62.6)	19.8 (67.6)	23.6 (74.5)	26.8 (80.2)	28.1 (82.6)	28.2 (82.8)	27.7 (81.9)	26.5 (79.7)	23.9 (75.0)	20.1 (68.2)	16.6 (61.9)	22.8 (73.0)
Mean daily minimum °C (°F)	12.9 (55.2)	14.8 (58.6)	17.7 (63.9)	21.1 (70.0)	23.7 (74.7)	25.1 (77.2)	25.3 (77.5)	24.9 (76.8)	23.5 (74.3)	20.7 (69.3)	16.8 (62.2)	13.4 (56.1)	20.0 (68.0)
Record low °C (°F)	0.5 (32.9)	3.2 (37.8)	6.5 (43.7)	11.4 (52.5)	12.5 (54.5)	18.1 (64.6)	20.2 (68.4)	20.5 (68.9)	13.6 (56.5)	8.1 (46.6)	3.9 (39.0)	−0.4 (31.3)	−0.4 (31.3)
Average precipitation mm (inches)	24.3 (0.96)	28.9 (1.14)	55.9 (2.20)	101.5 (4.00)	208.4 (8.20)	263.3 (10.37)	325.3 (12.81)	306.2 (12.06)	174.5 (6.87)	97.6 (3.84)	43.2 (1.70)	19.5 (0.77)	1,650.5 (64.98)
Average rainy days	9.3	11.3	17.0	16.7	15.4	16.6	18.8	18.7	13.1	9.7	6.7	6.0	159.5
Average relative humidity (%)	82.1	82.8	84.2	84.6	82.0	83.1	84.3	85.3	84.5	83.5	82.0	81.0	83.3
Mean monthly sunshine hours	53.2	44.9	40.6	80.9	144.8	146.9	153.6	168.1	161.9	138.4	115.6	87.2	1,328.8
Source: Vietnam Institute for Building Science and Technology
