= Lục Ngạn district =

Lục Ngạn District Huyện Lục Ngạn
- District
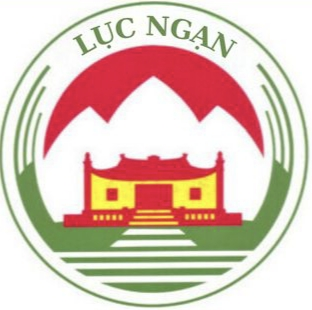
- Seal
- Interactive map of Lục Ngạn District
- Country: Vietnam
- Province: Bắc Giang
- Capital: Phì Điền

Government
  - Party Secretary: Thân Văn Khánh
  - People's Council Chairman: Nguyễn Thanh Bình
  - People's Committee Chairman: Thân Văn Khánh

Area
  - Total: 391 sq mi (1,012 km^{2})

Population
  - Total: 226,540
- Time zone: UTC+7 (Indochina Time)

Lục Ngạn is a former rural district of Bắc Giang province in the Northeast region of Vietnam. This district is famous for its Kim Sơn Thiều lychee. As of 2019 the district had a population of 226,540. The district covers an area of 1,012 km^{2}. The district capital lies at Chũ.

== Administrative divisions ==
The district is divided administratively into 2 townships: Phì Điền (the capital), Biển Động, and 17 communes: Cấm Sơn, Tân Sơn, Phong Vân, Sa Lý, Phong Minh, Sơn Hải, Hộ Đáp, Kim Sơn, Biên Sơn, Giáp Sơn, Tân Hoa, Tân Quang, Tân Mộc, Đèo Gia, Đồng Cốc, Phú Nhuận, Nghĩa Hò, Tân Quang and Tân Lập.

== Climate ==
Climate data for Lục Ngạn
Month	Jan	Feb	Mar	Apr	May	Jun	Jul	Aug	Sep	Oct	Nov	Dec	Year
Record high °C (°F)	32.4 (90.3)	34.7 (94.5)	36.8 (98.2)	38.2 (100.8)	40.0 (104.0)	40.8 (105.4)	39.2 (102.6)	39.2 (102.6)	37.8 (100.0)	35.5 (95.9)	34.5 (94.1)	31.3 (88.3)	40.8 (105.4)
Mean daily maximum °C (°F)	20.1 (68.2)	21.1 (70.0)	23.9 (75.0)	28.4 (83.1)	32.3 (90.1)	33.3 (91.9)	33.4 (92.1)	32.8 (91.0)	32.0 (89.6)	29.6 (85.3)	26.2 (79.2)	22.5 (72.5)	28.0 (82.4)
Daily mean °C (°F)	15.7 (60.3)	17.2 (63.0)	20.2 (68.4)	24.2 (75.6)	27.5 (81.5)	28.8 (83.8)	28.8 (83.8)	28.2 (82.8)	27.1 (80.8)	24.5 (76.1)	20.8 (69.4)	17.2 (63.0)	23.3 (73.9)
Mean daily minimum °C (°F)	12.7 (54.9)	14.5 (58.1)	17.96 (64.33)	21.2 (70.2)	24.0 (75.2)	25.5 (77.9)	25.7 (78.3)	25.2 (77.4)	23.9 (75.0)	21.0 (69.8)	17.1 (62.8)	13.5 (56.3)	20.2 (68.4)
Record low °C (°F)	−1.0 (30.2)	2.6 (36.7)	5.9 (42.6)	11.5 (52.7)	15.8 (60.4)	18.4 (65.1)	21.2 (70.2)	19.1 (66.4)	15.4 (59.7)	8.3 (46.9)	4.3 (39.7)	0.8 (33.4)	−1.0 (30.2)
Average precipitation mm (inches)	25.2 (0.99)	24.0 (0.94)	41.8 (1.65)	102.5 (4.04)	164.4 (6.47)	213.3 (8.40)	251.3 (9.89)	246.7 (9.71)	168.7 (6.64)	88.9 (3.50)	36.9 (1.45)	19.1 (0.75)	1,382.8 (54.44)
Average rainy days	7.6	8.7	11.5	10.9	13.4	15.1	16.3	17.7	13.3	9.1	6.4	4.5	134.4
Average relative humidity (%)	78.4	80.0	82.1	81.7	79.6	81.3	82.6	85.2	83.2	80.8	78.7	77.1	80.8
Mean monthly sunshine hours	78.6	56.3	57.0	100.9	187.5	173.6	191.6	174.9	182.3	171.2	145.1	122.7	1,649.6
Source: Vietnam Institute for Building Science and Technology, Nchmf.gov.vn (August record high)
