= Kim Sơn district =

Coordinates: 20.083°N 106.083°E

Kim Sơn district Huyện Kim Sơn
- District
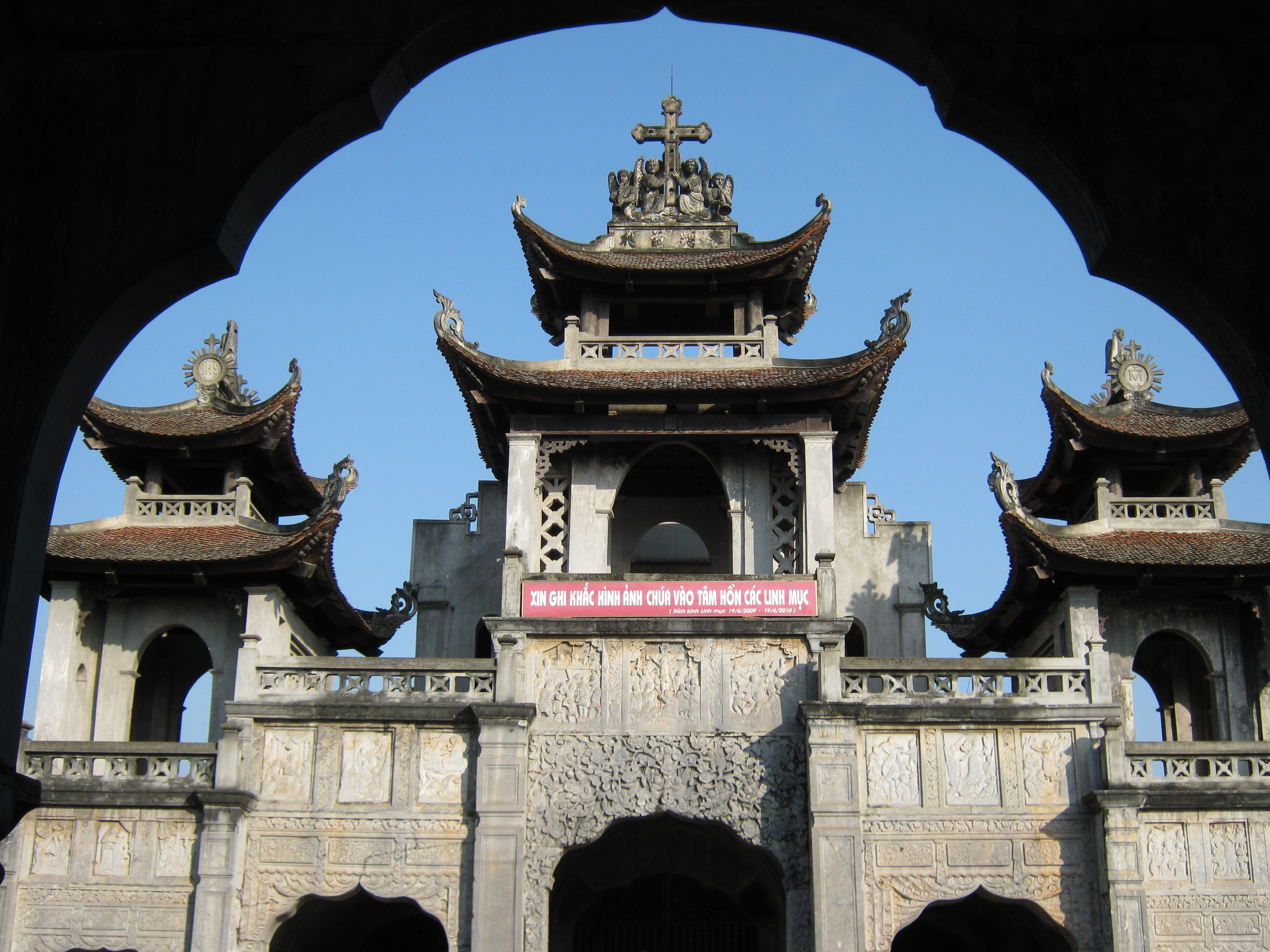
- The front of the Phat Diem Cathedral
- Interactive map of Kim Sơn district
- Country: Vietnam
- Region: Red River Delta
- Province: Ninh Bình
- Capital: Phát Diệm

Area
  - Total: 64 sq mi (165 km^{2})

Population (2003)
  - Total: 171,660
- Time zone: UTC+7 (Indochina Time)
- Website: kimson.ninhbinh.gov.vn

Kim Sơn is a rural district of Ninh Bình province in the Red River Delta region of Vietnam. As of 2003 the district had a population of 171,660. The district covers an area of 165 km^{2}. The district capital lies at Phát Diệm. Before 1828, this area was a wild costal area. In 1928, the Nguyen Dynasty's mandarin Nguyen Cong Tru led a large-scale land reclamation and clearance project in the area and founded the district in 1929. The name of Kim Sơn means golden mountain.

== Gallery ==
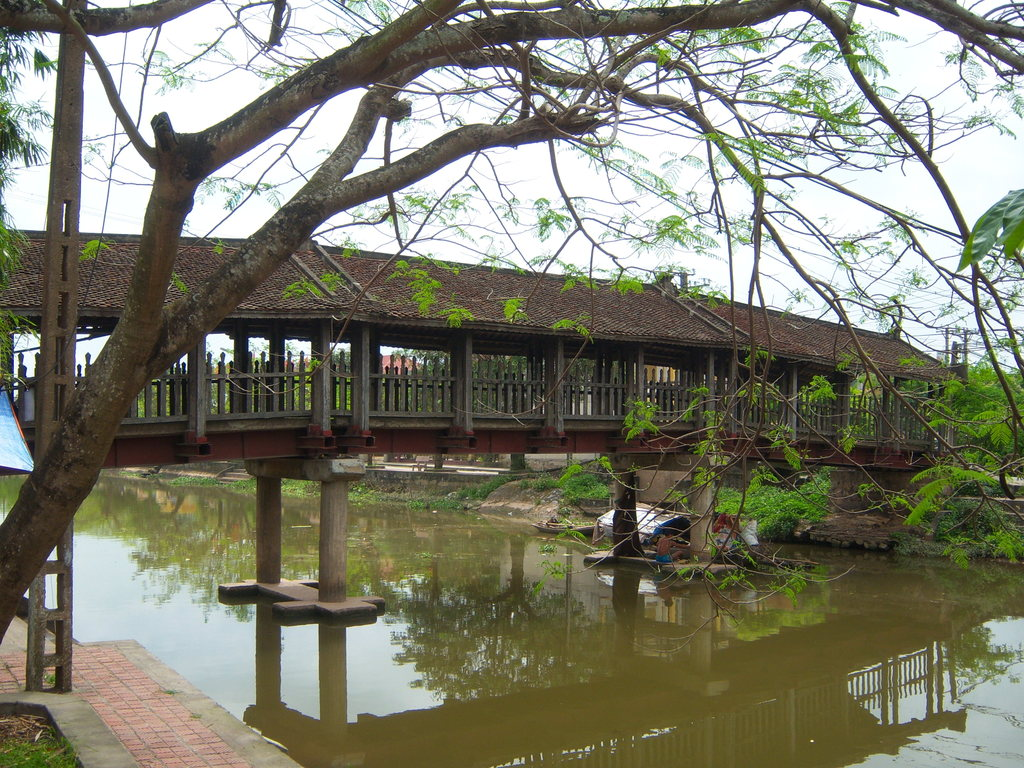
Tile-roofed bridge

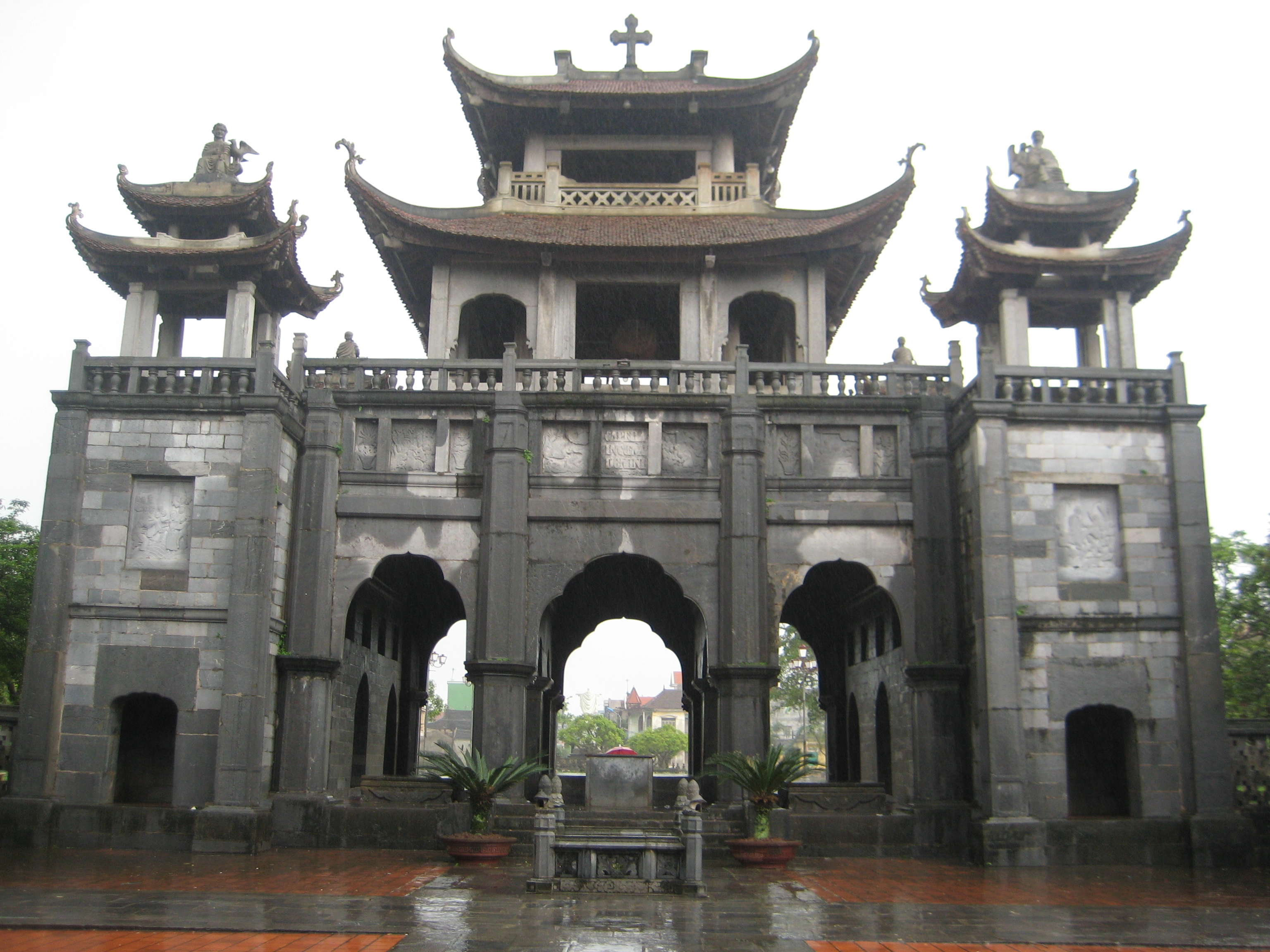
Bell hall of the Phát Diệm Cathedral

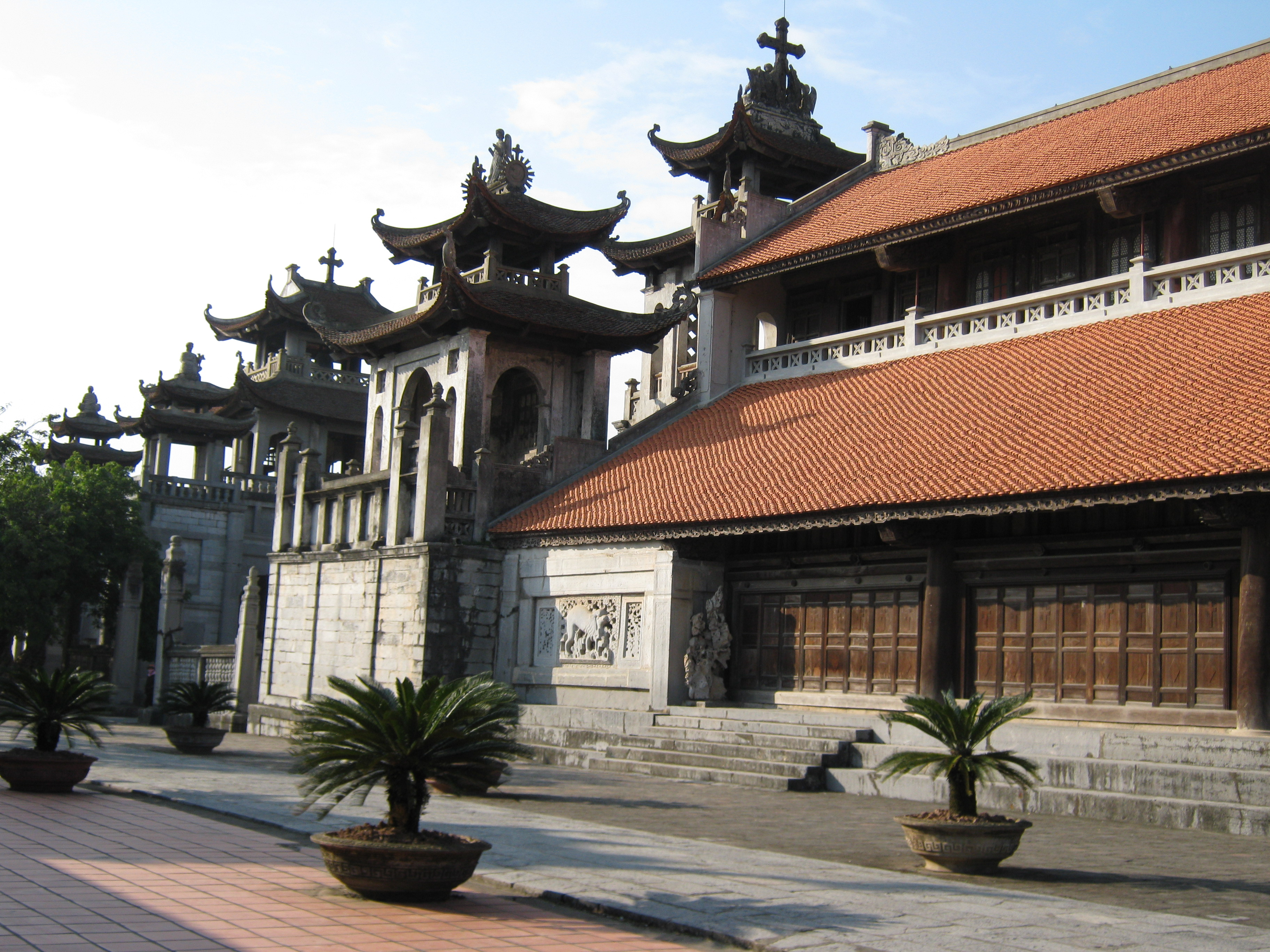
The Cathedral

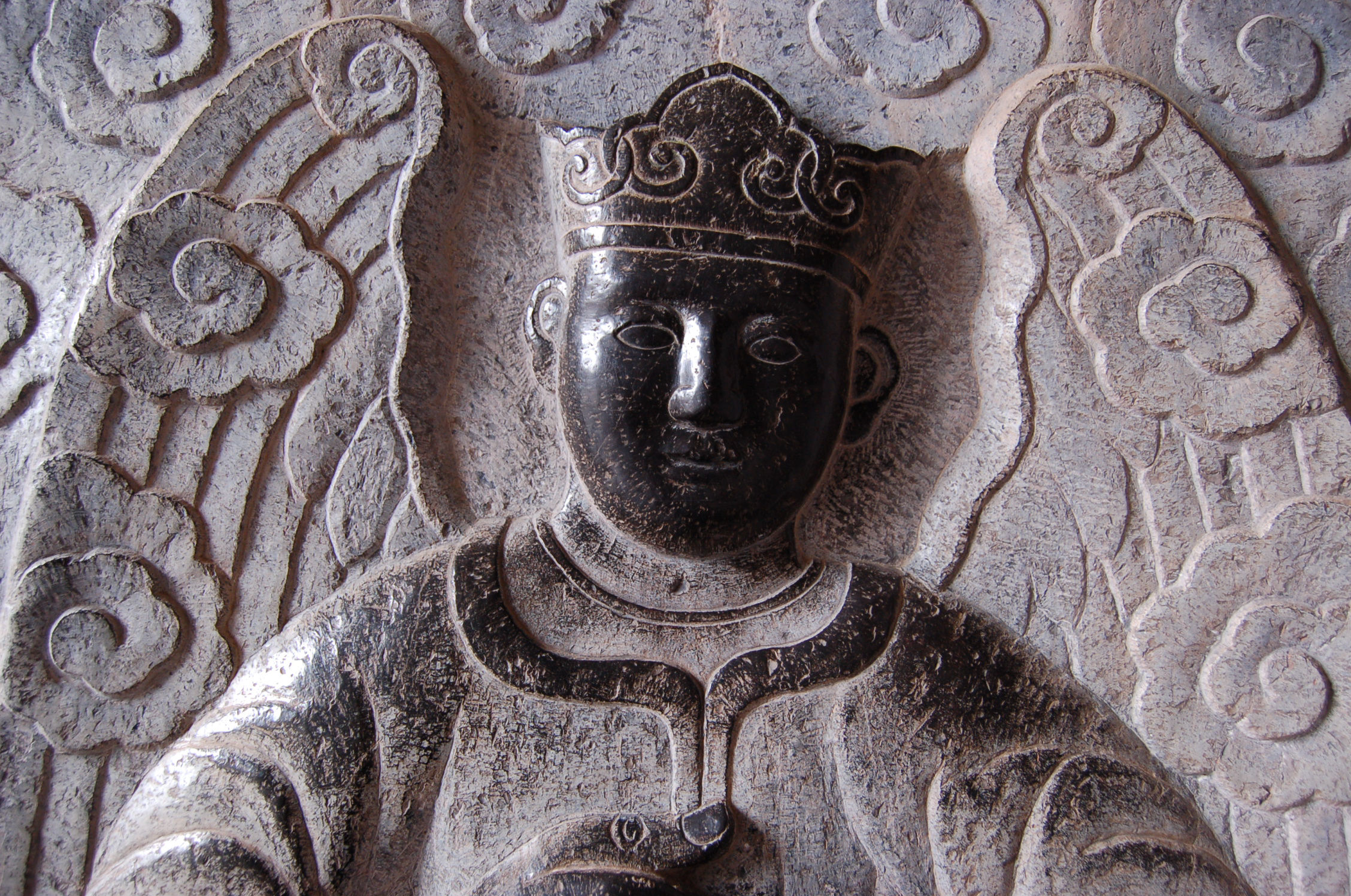
An angel carving
