= Biển Động =

Coordinates: 21°24′N 106°45′E

- Commune and village
- Interactive map of Biển Động
- Country: Vietnam
- City: Bắc Ninh
- Time zone: UTC+07:00

Biển Động is a commune (xã) and village in Bắc Ninh, in northeastern Vietnam.
