= Phát Diệm =

Phát Diệm Xã Phát Diệm
- Commune
- Phát Diệm commune
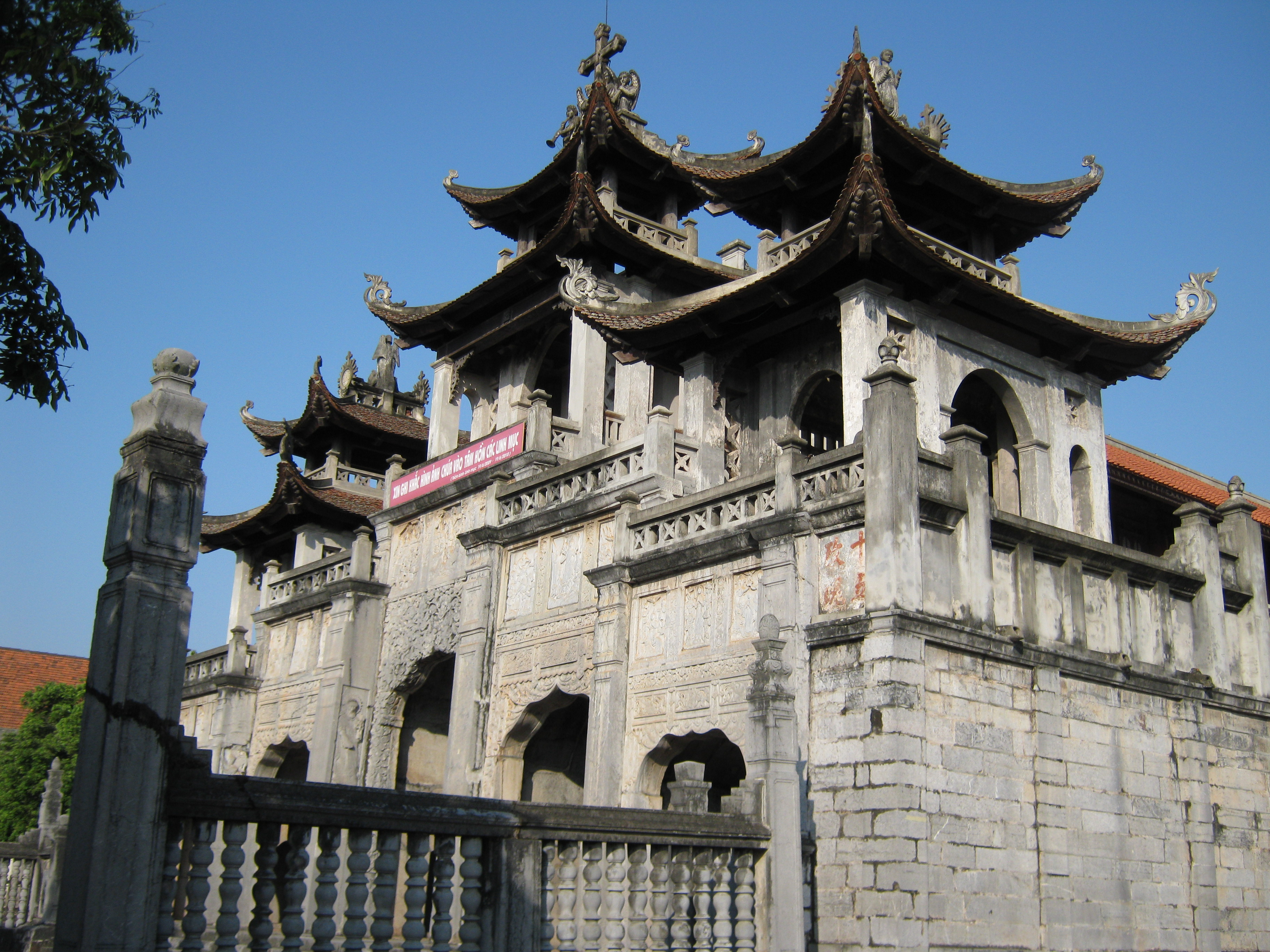
- Phát Diệm Cathedral

- Location within Vietnam
- Coordinates: 20°05′23″N 106°04′57″E
- Country: Vietnam
- Region: Red River Delta
- Province: Ninh Bình
- Time zone: UTC+7 (UTC + 7)

Phát Diệm is a commune (xã) of Ninh Bình Province, Vietnam. A major landmark of the township is Phát Diệm Cathedral, a 19th-century Roman Catholic church built in an eclectic blend of Vietnamese and European architectural styles.
