= 1978 Pacific typhoon season =

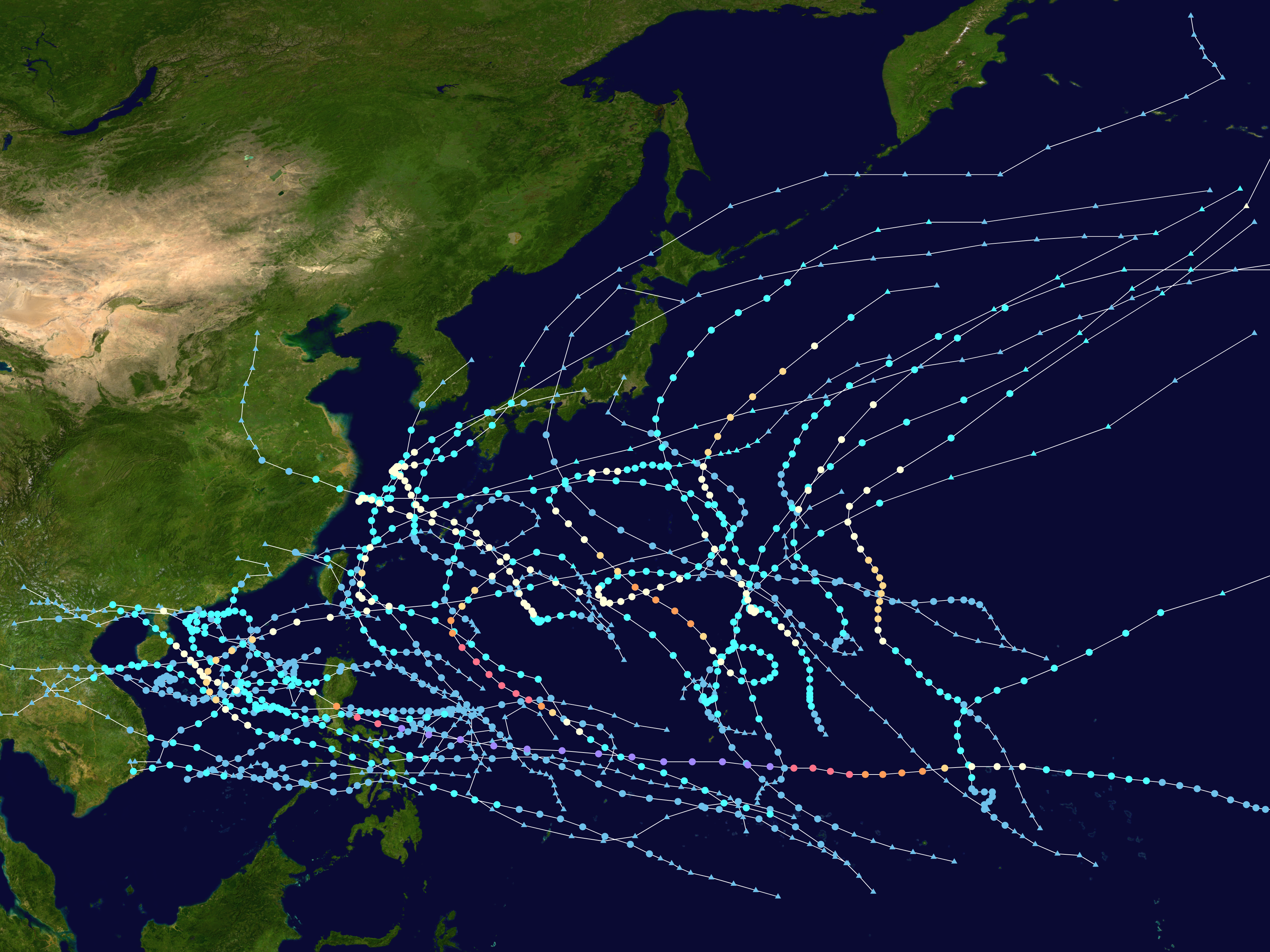
- Season summary map

Seasonal boundaries
- First system formed: January 6, 1978
- Last system dissipated: December 19, 1978

Strongest storm
- Name: Rita
  - Maximum winds: 220 km/h (140 mph) (10-minute sustained)
  - Lowest pressure: 880 hPa (mbar)

Seasonal statistics
- Total depressions: 63
- Total storms: 30
- Typhoons: 16
- Very strong typhoons: 3
- Violent typhoons: 2
- Total fatalities: >404
- Total damage: > $100 million (1978 USD)

Related articles
- 1978 Atlantic hurricane season; 1978 Pacific hurricane season; 1978 North Indian Ocean cyclone season

The 1978 Pacific typhoon season was a very active season that produced 31 tropical storms, 16 typhoons and one intense typhoon. It ran year-round in 1978, but most tropical cyclones tend to form in the northwestern Pacific Ocean between June and December. These dates conventionally delimit the period of each year when most tropical cyclones form in the northwestern Pacific Ocean.

The scope of this article is limited to the Pacific Ocean, north of the equator and west of the International Date Line. Tropical storms that formed in the basin were assigned a name by the Joint Typhoon Warning Center while systems that were active in the Philippine area of responsibility were assigned a name by the Philippine Atmospheric, Geophysical and Astronomical Services Administration (PAGASA). This often results in the same storm having two names.

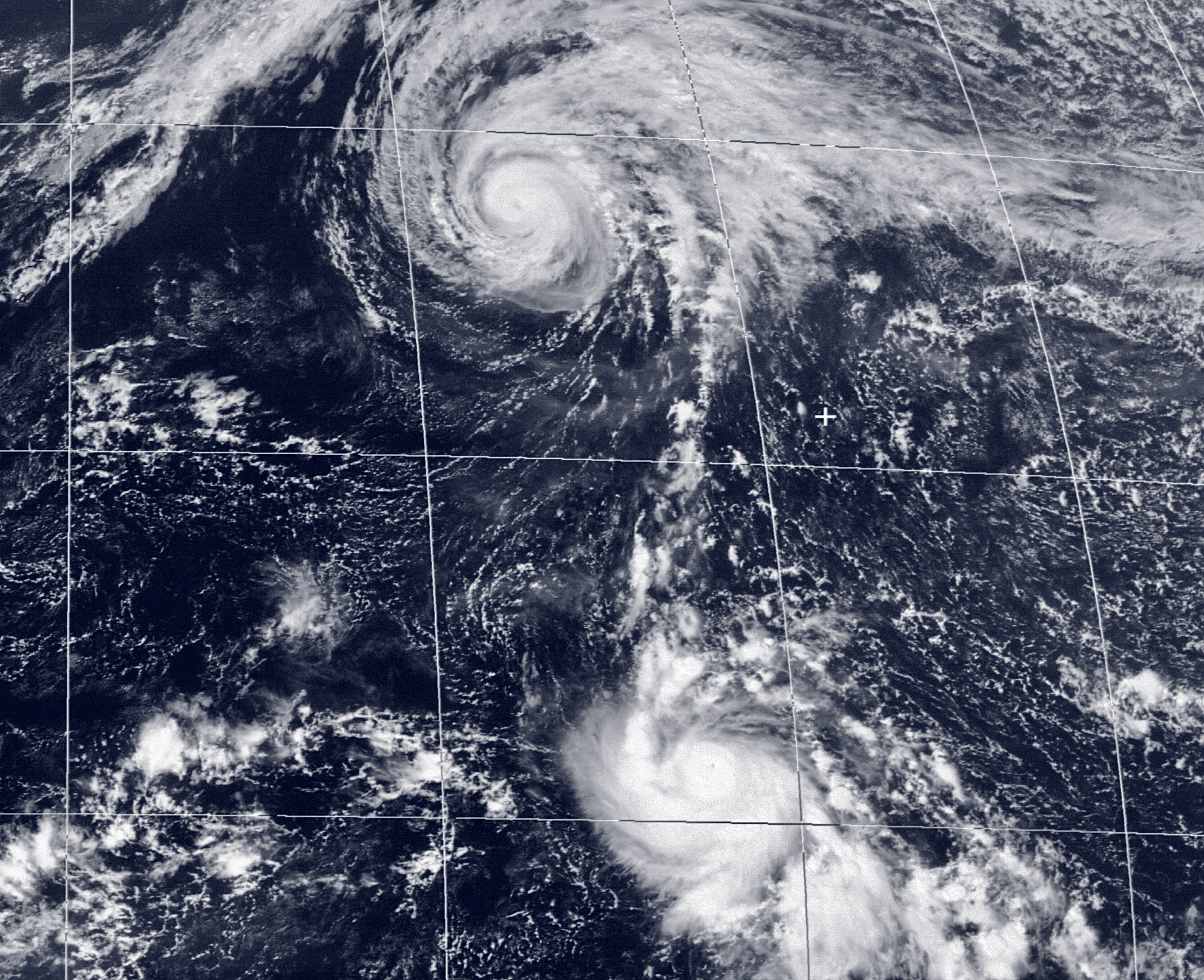
Typhoon Phyllis (top) and Typhoon Rita (bottom) both simultaneously active on October 21

== Seasonal summary ==
33 tropical depressions formed this year in the Western Pacific, of which 29 became tropical storms. 15 storms reached typhoon intensity, of which 1 reached super typhoon strength. Many of the storms either remained at sea or failed to do any damage.

== Systems ==
=== Severe Tropical Storm Nadine ===
- Severe tropical storm (JMA)
- Tropical storm (SSHWS)
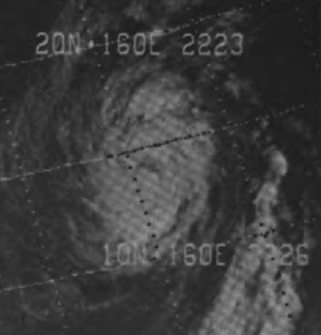
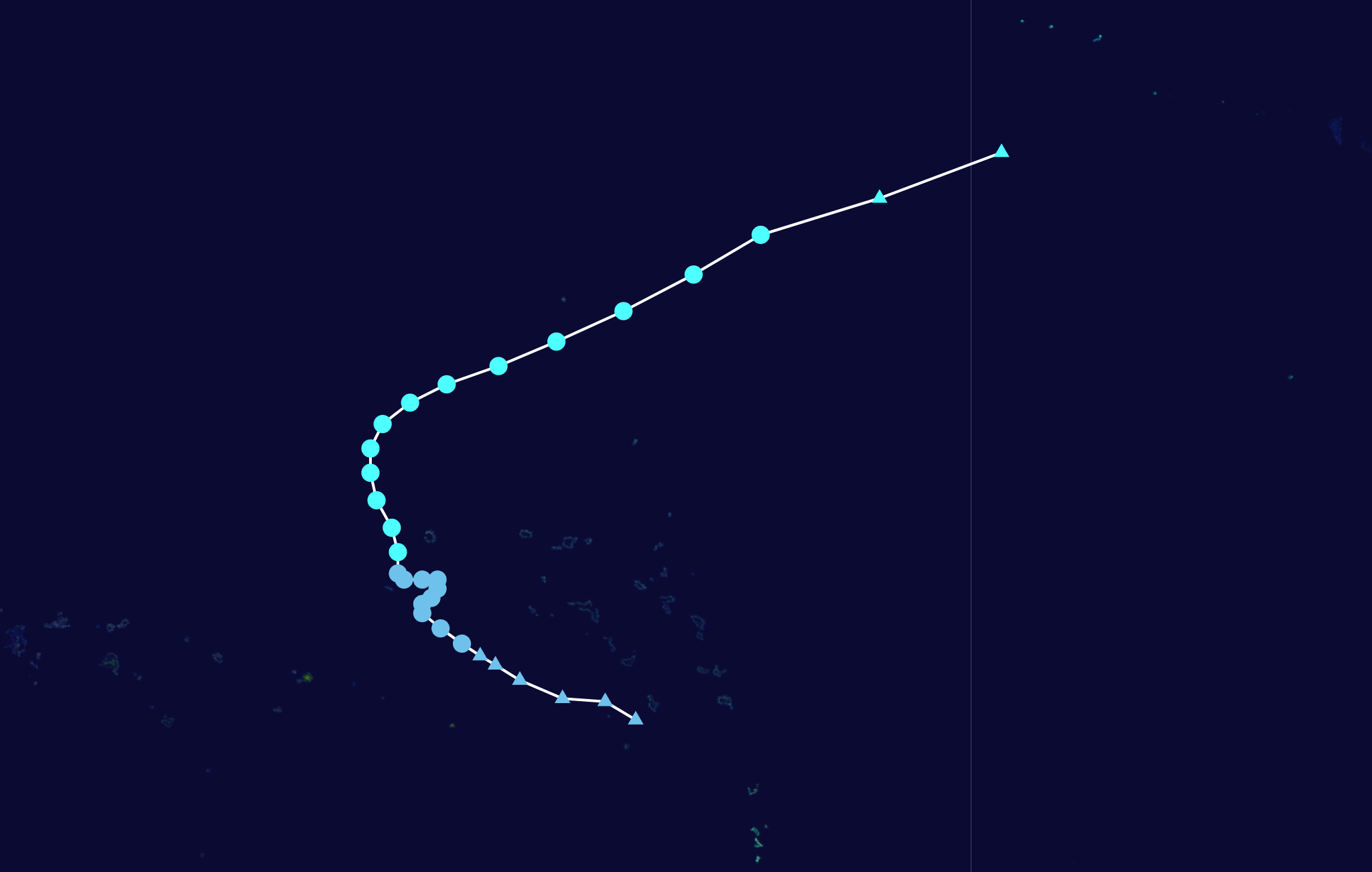
- Duration: January 6 – January 13
- Peak intensity: 100 km/h (65 mph) (10-min); 970 hPa (mbar)

Nadine stayed at sea and was the first severe tropical storm of the season. It lived at least 1 week.

=== Typhoon Olive (Atang) ===
- Typhoon (JMA)
- Category 2 typhoon (SSHWS)
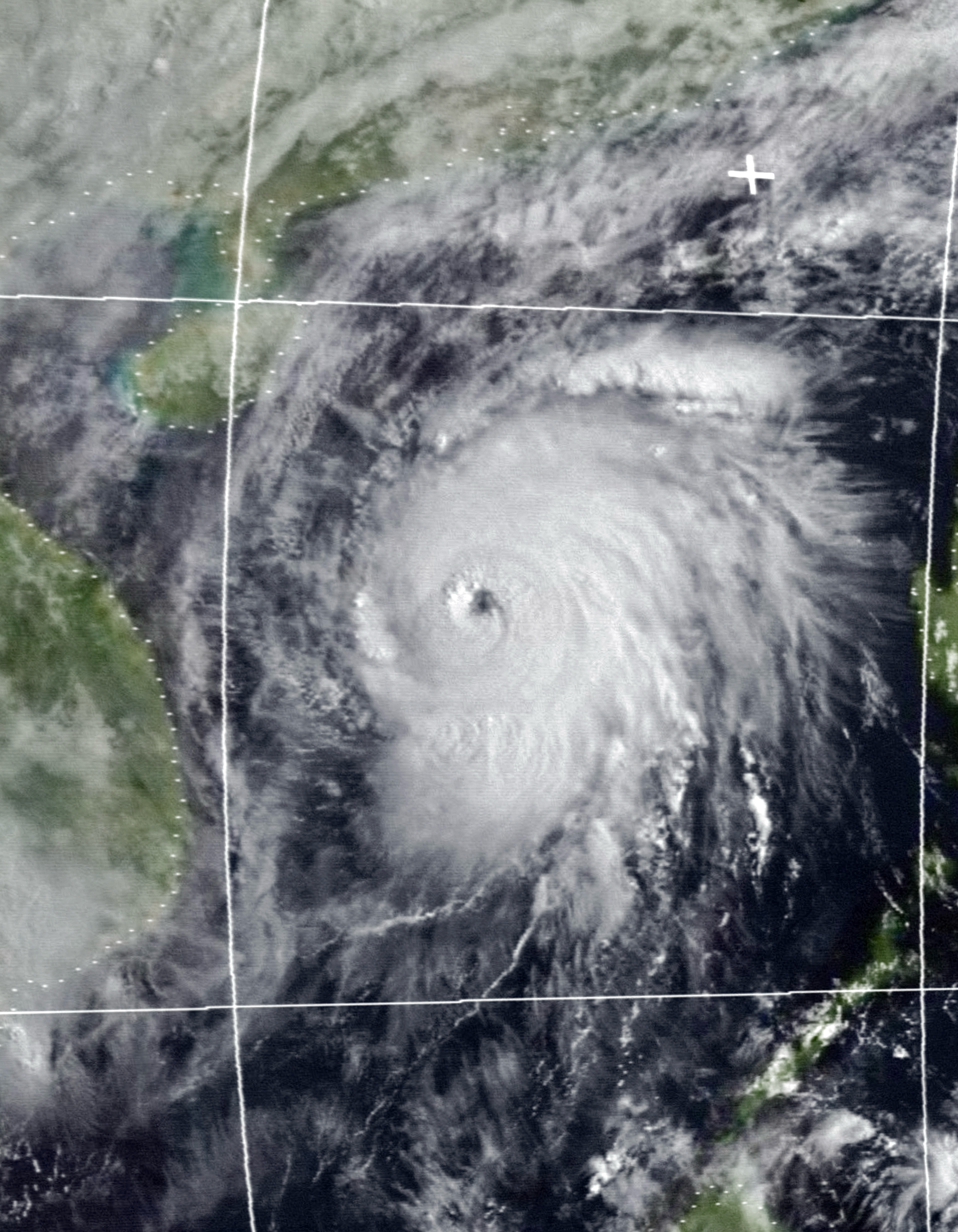
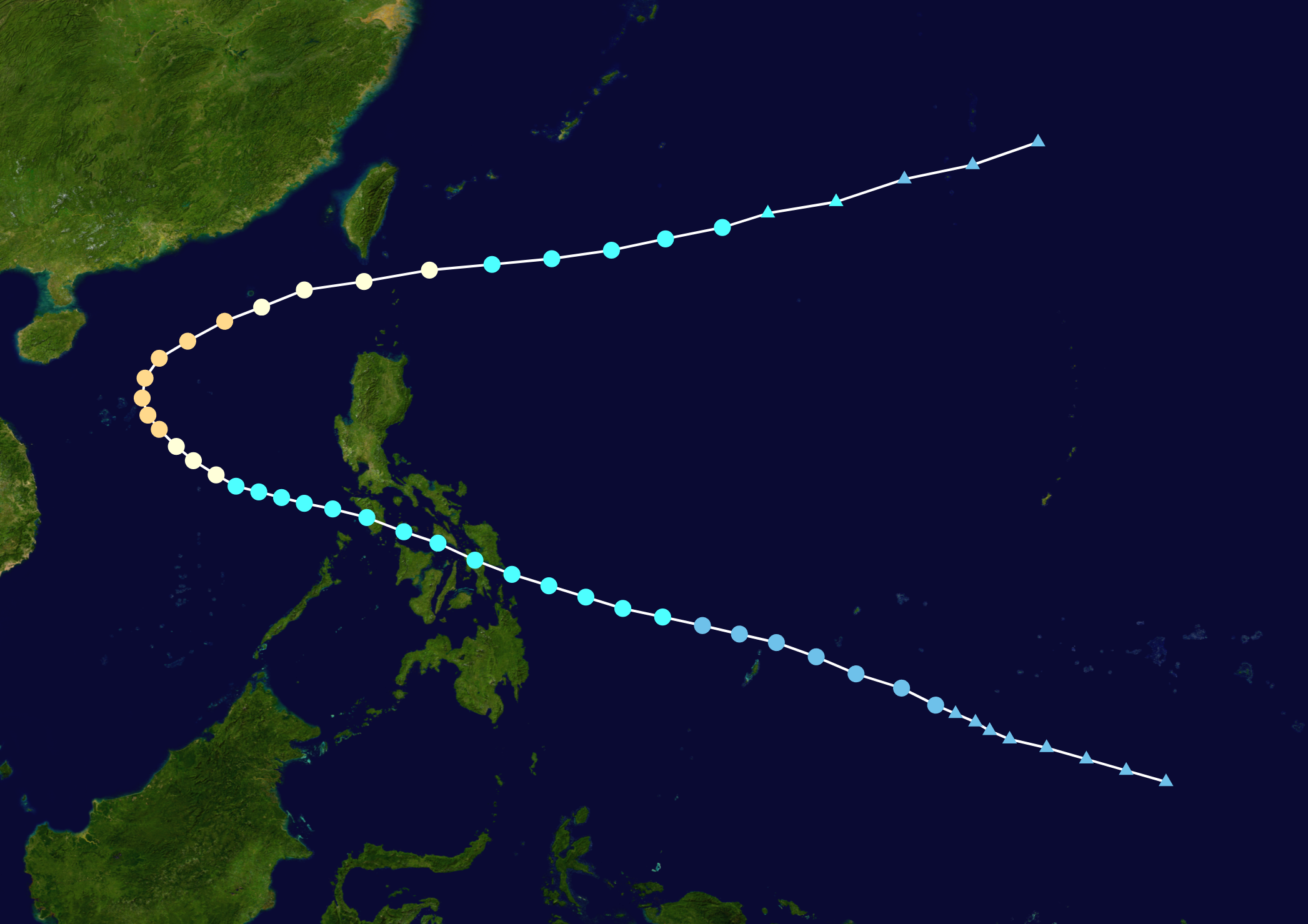
- Duration: April 15 – April 26
- Peak intensity: 150 km/h (90 mph) (10-min); 955 hPa (mbar)

On 12:00 UTC on April 11, the Joint Typhoon Warning Center (JTWC) began to monitor a surface circulation which had formed within the trough. Five days later, the JTWC issued their first warning on the system as it began coalescing. On April 18, the system entered the Philippine Area of Responsibility, resulting in PAGASA naming the system Atang. Later that day, the system intensified into a tropical storm, resulting in it being named Olive.

Olive would steadily intensify after it entered the South China Sea on April 20, being in an environment with good outflow aloft and warm Sea surface temperatures, resulting in it intensifying into a typhoon on April 22. Olive would recurve due to a break in the subtropical ridge, peaking with sustained winds of 100 mph (160 km/h) the next day. It accelerated to the east-northeast, steadily weakening due to intruding cool and dry air, resulting in the system becoming extratropical early on April 26.

As Olive passed the Philippines, it would affect nearly 370,000 people in the nation, leaving 3,500 homeless. The MV Leyte, a lengthened ship of the Compania Maritima was caught in it, being wrecked in the southwestern portion of Sibuyan Island as she was on a Manila-Cebu voyage. The Hong Kong Observatory would hoist its Stand-By Signal No. 1 for Hong Kong on April 24 as Olive was at its closest to the island.

=== Tropical Storm Polly (Bising) ===
- Tropical storm (JMA)
- Tropical storm (SSHWS)
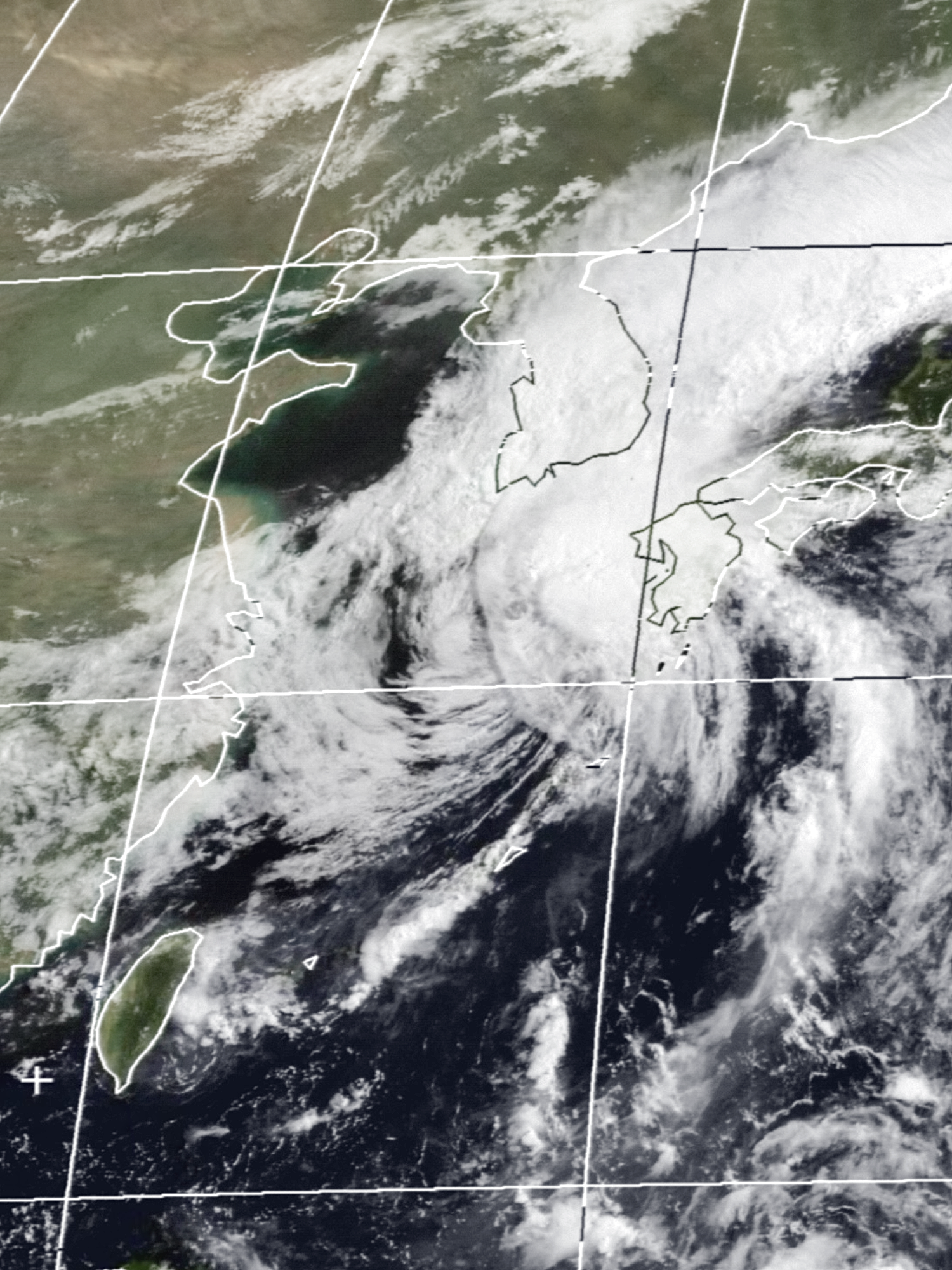
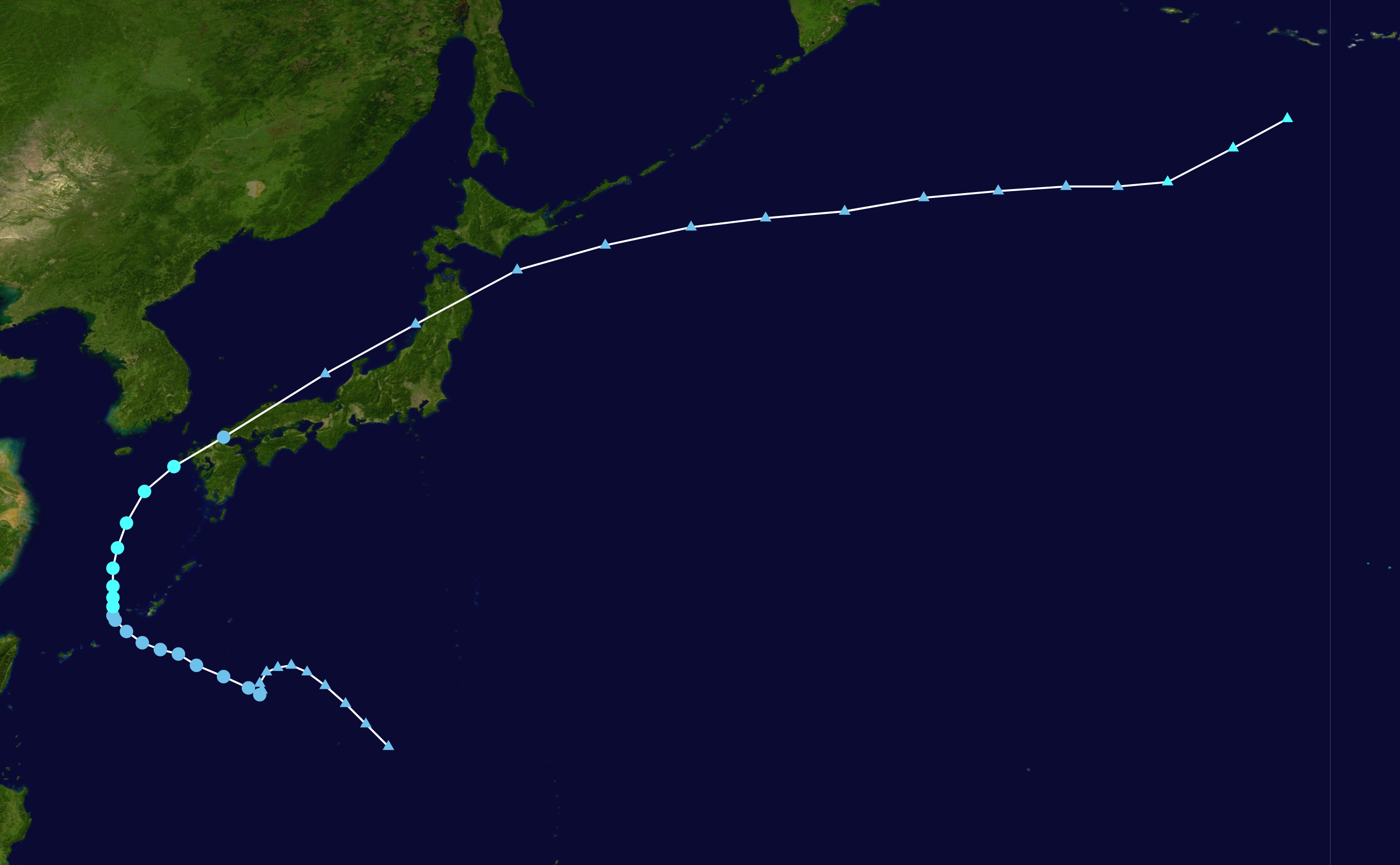
- Duration: June 13 – June 20
- Peak intensity: 85 km/h (50 mph) (10-min); 985 hPa (mbar)

Polly was the first of three weak June systems.

=== Tropical Storm Rose (Klaring) ===
- Tropical storm (JMA)
- Tropical storm (SSHWS)
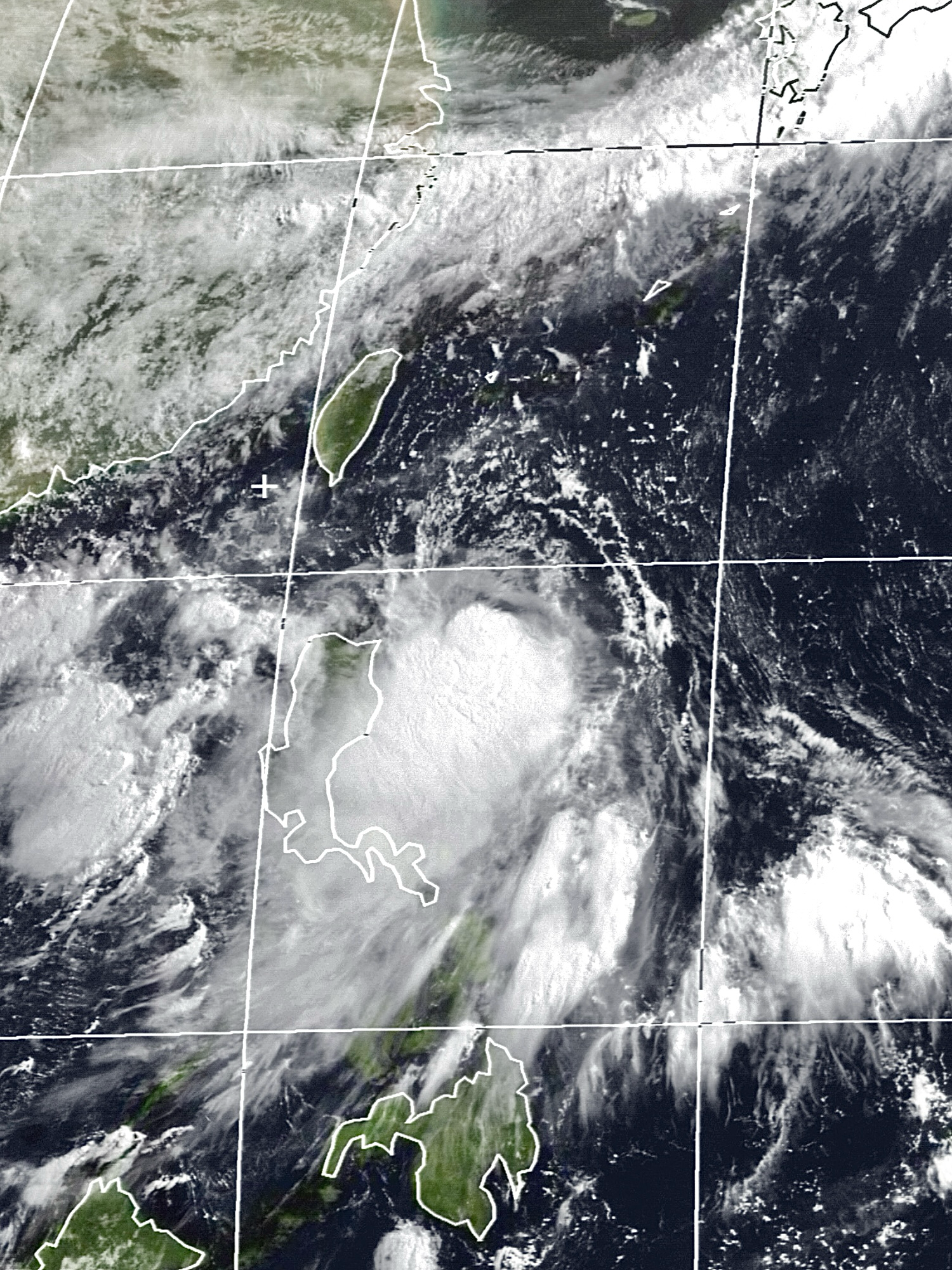
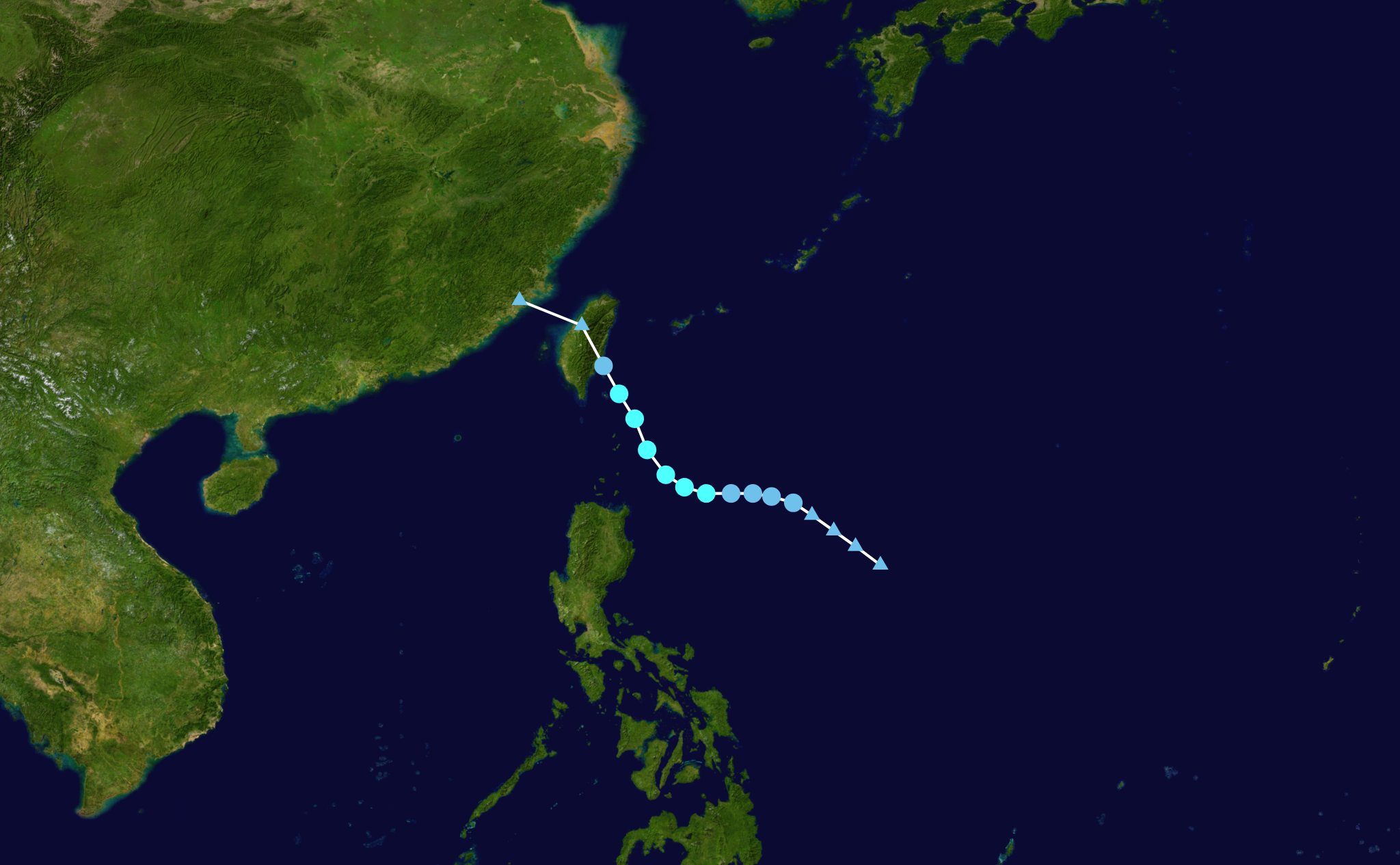
- Duration: June 21 – June 24
- Peak intensity: 85 km/h (50 mph) (10-min); 990 hPa (mbar)

Rose was the second of three weak June systems.

=== Tropical Storm Shirley (Deling) ===
- Tropical storm (JMA)
- Tropical storm (SSHWS)
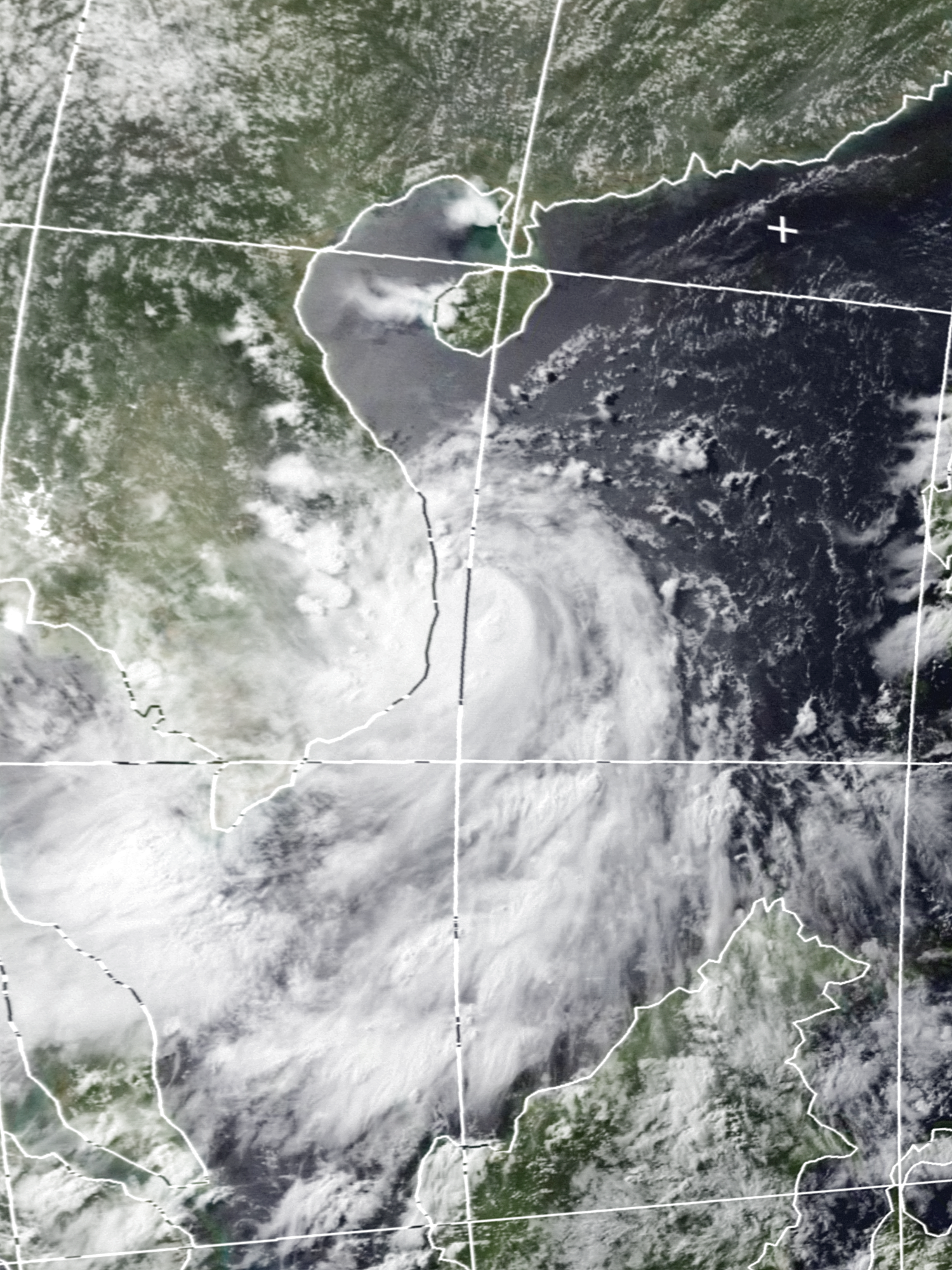
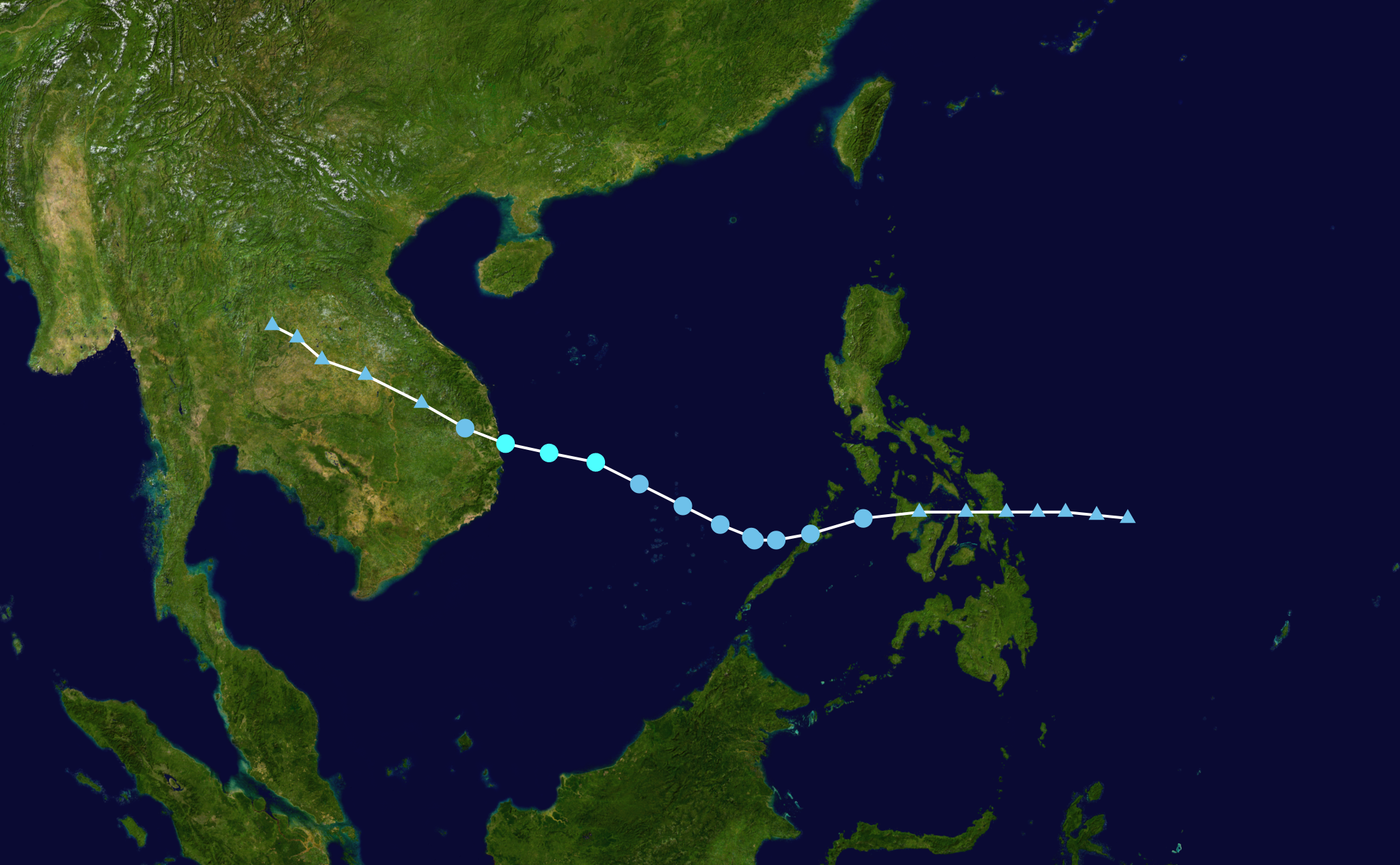
- Duration: June 26 – June 30
- Peak intensity: 85 km/h (50 mph) (10-min); 992 hPa (mbar)

Shirley hit Vietnam as a tropical storm.

=== Typhoon Trix ===
- Typhoon (JMA)
- Category 1 typhoon (SSHWS)
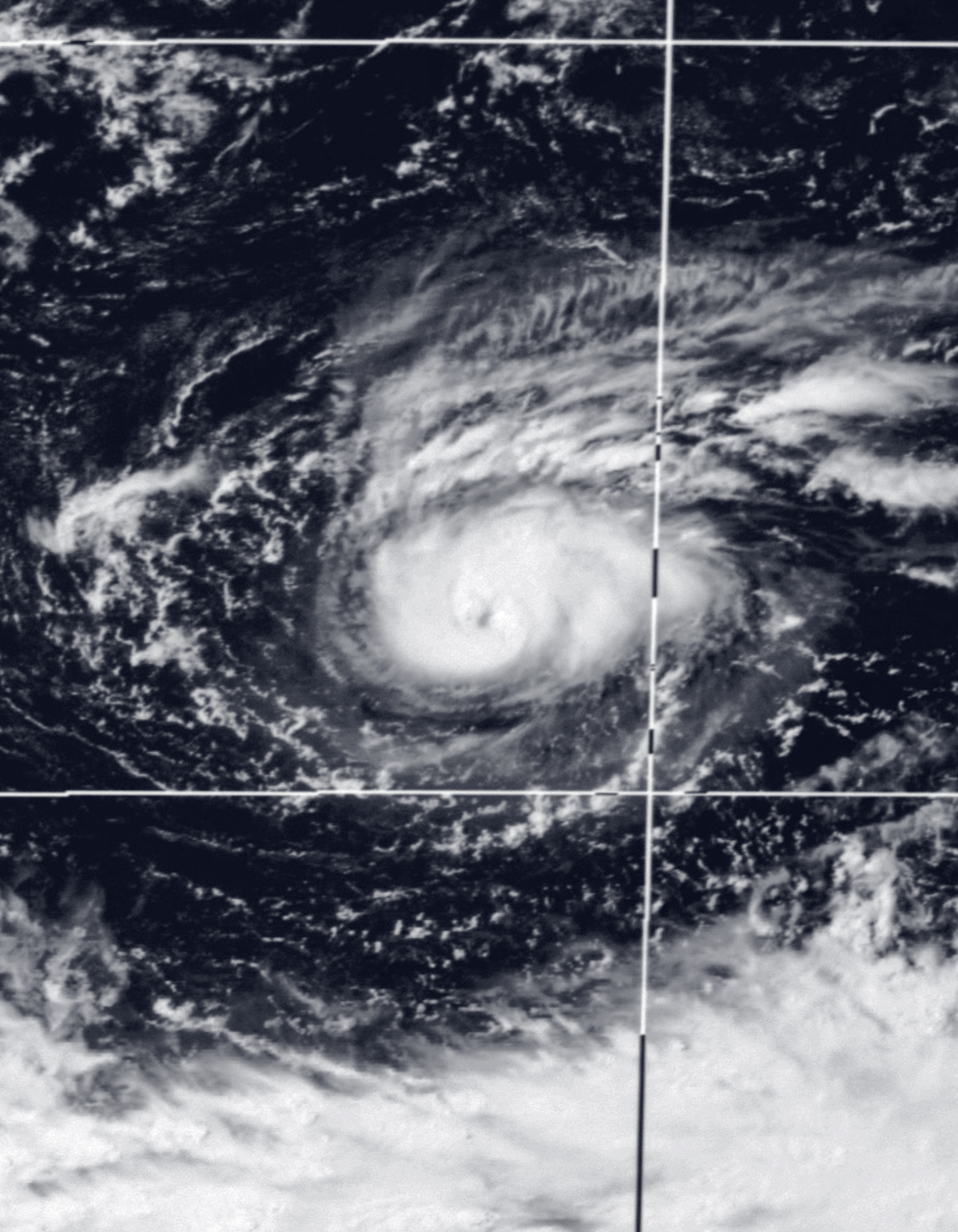
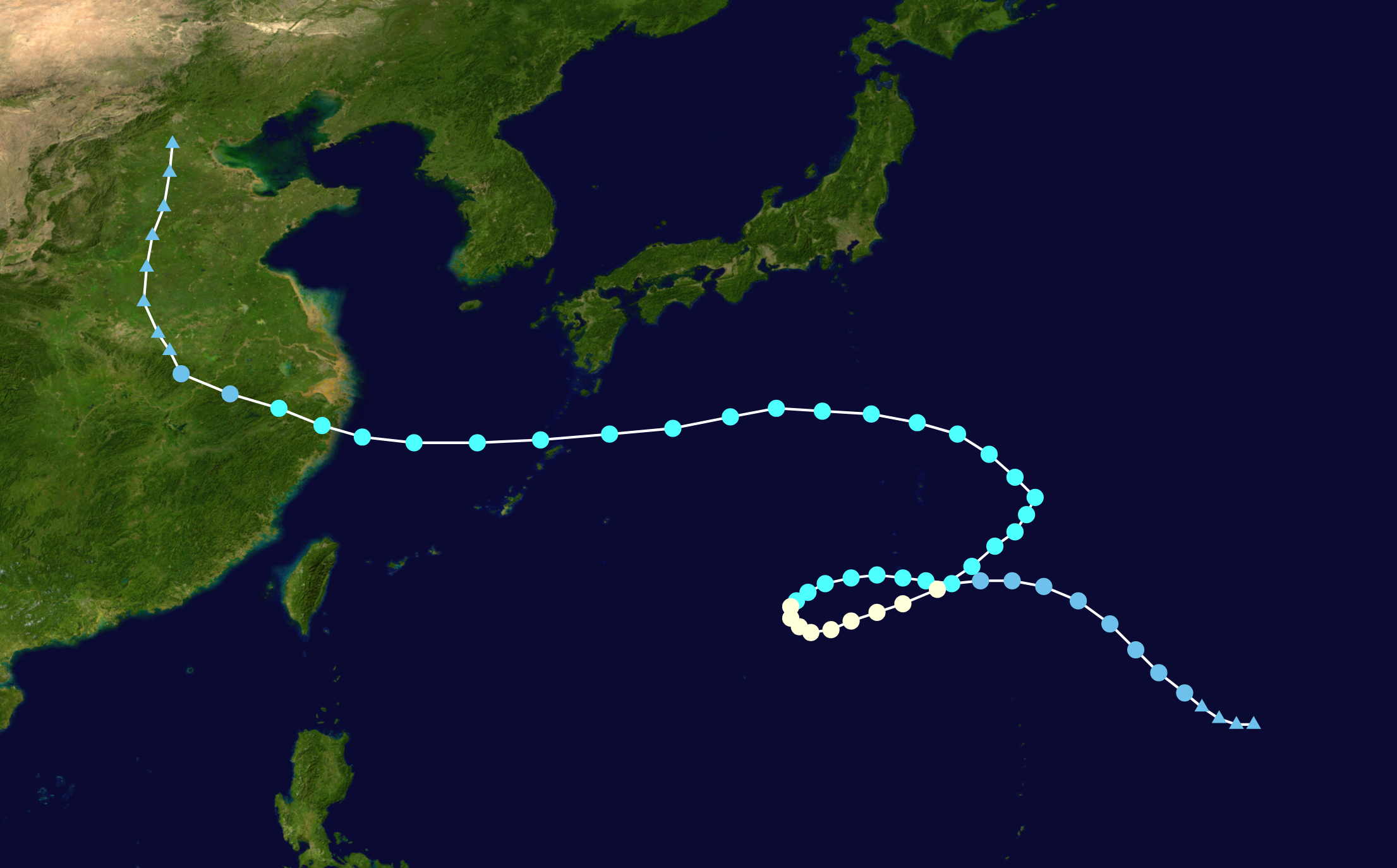
- Duration: July 11 – July 23
- Peak intensity: 130 km/h (80 mph) (10-min); 965 hPa (mbar)

Trix did a loop.

=== Typhoon Virginia ===
- Typhoon (JMA)
- Category 1 typhoon (SSHWS)
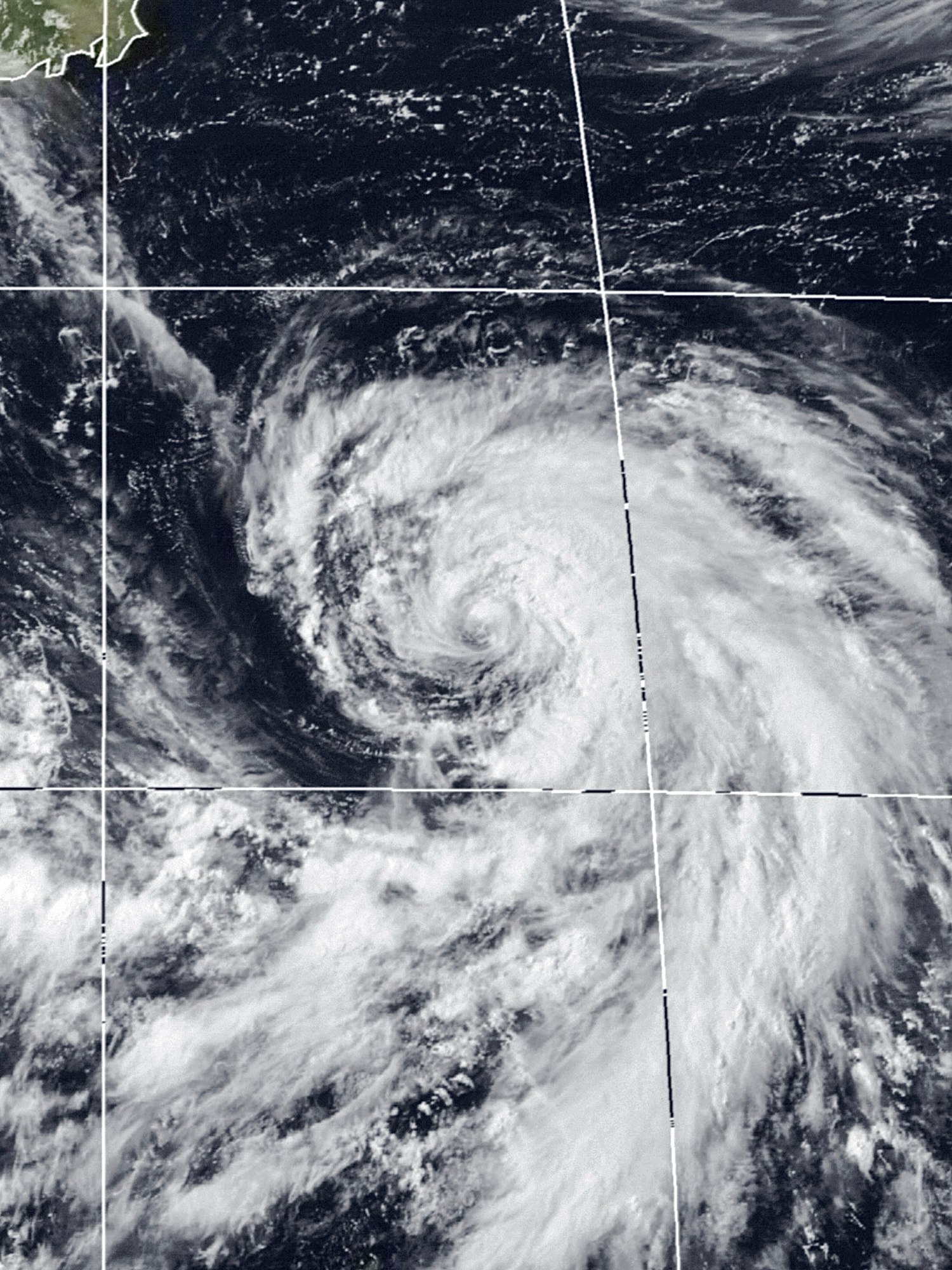
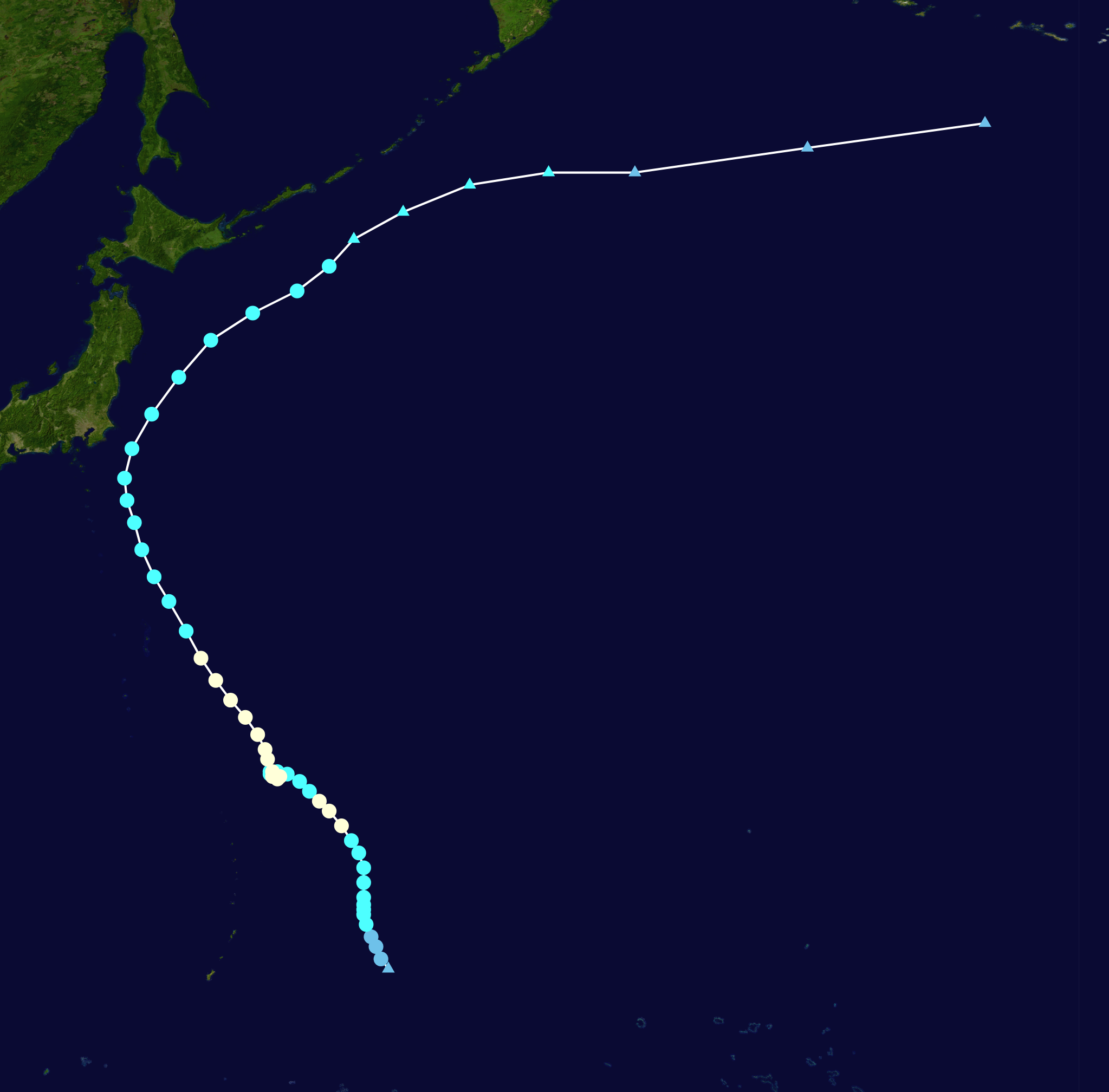
- Duration: July 22 – August 2
- Peak intensity: 130 km/h (80 mph) (10-min); 975 hPa (mbar)

Virginia stayed largely at sea.

=== Typhoon Wendy (Emang) ===
- Typhoon (JMA)
- Category 1 typhoon (SSHWS)
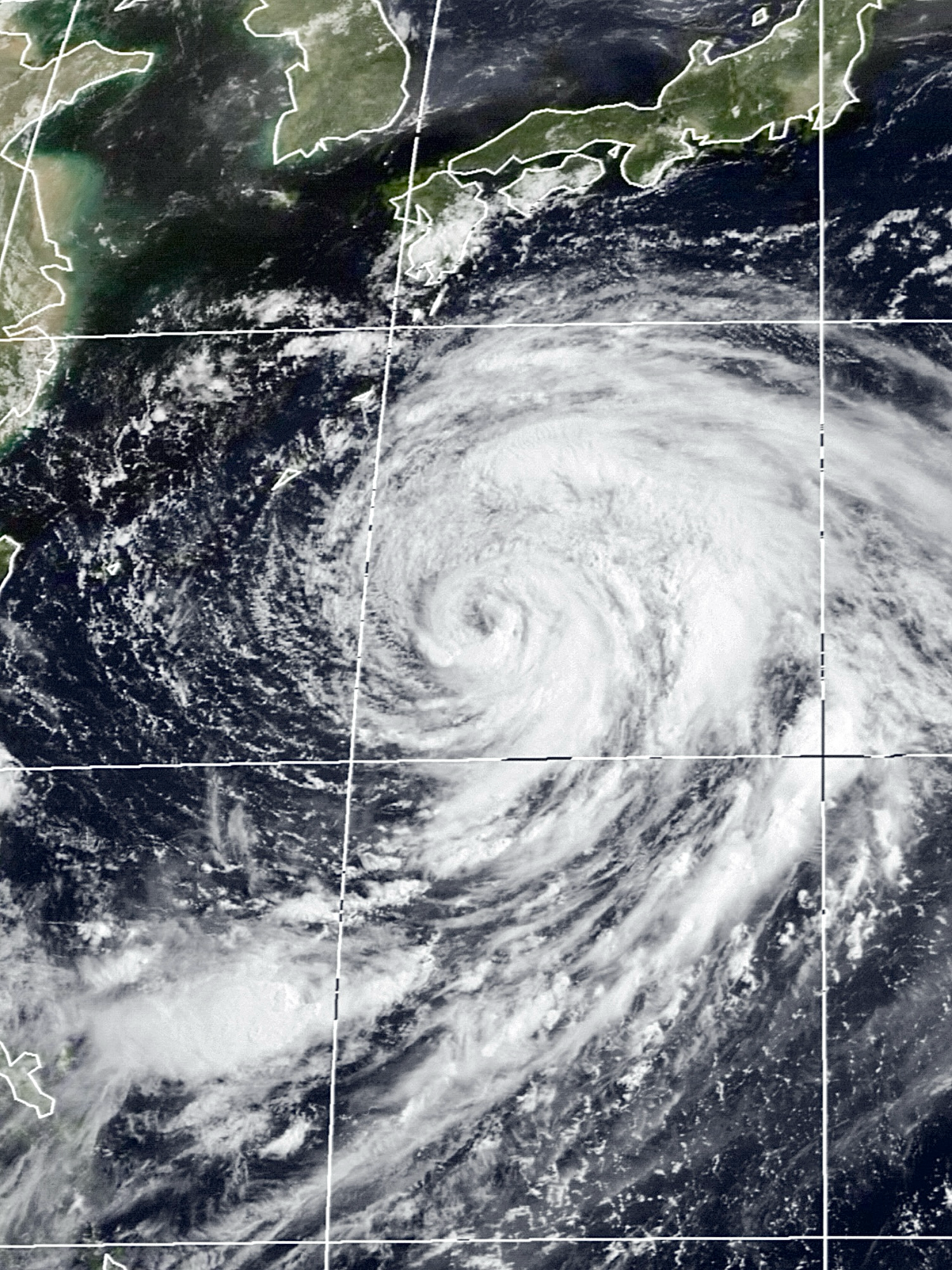
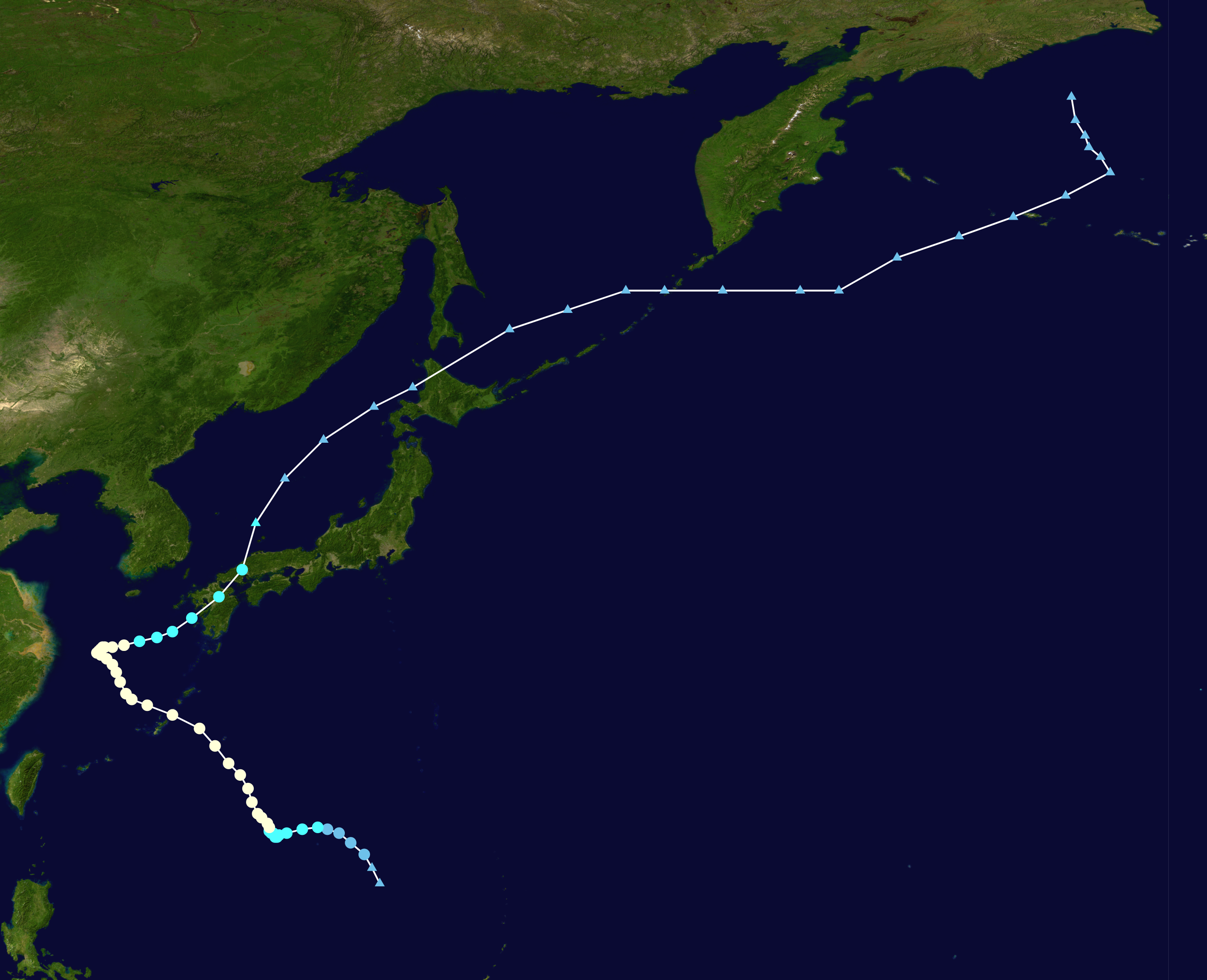
- Duration: July 22 – August 3
- Peak intensity: 130 km/h (80 mph) (10-min); 960 hPa (mbar)

Wendy ultimately hit Japan.

=== Severe Tropical Storm Agnes ===
- Severe tropical storm (JMA)
- Tropical storm (SSHWS)
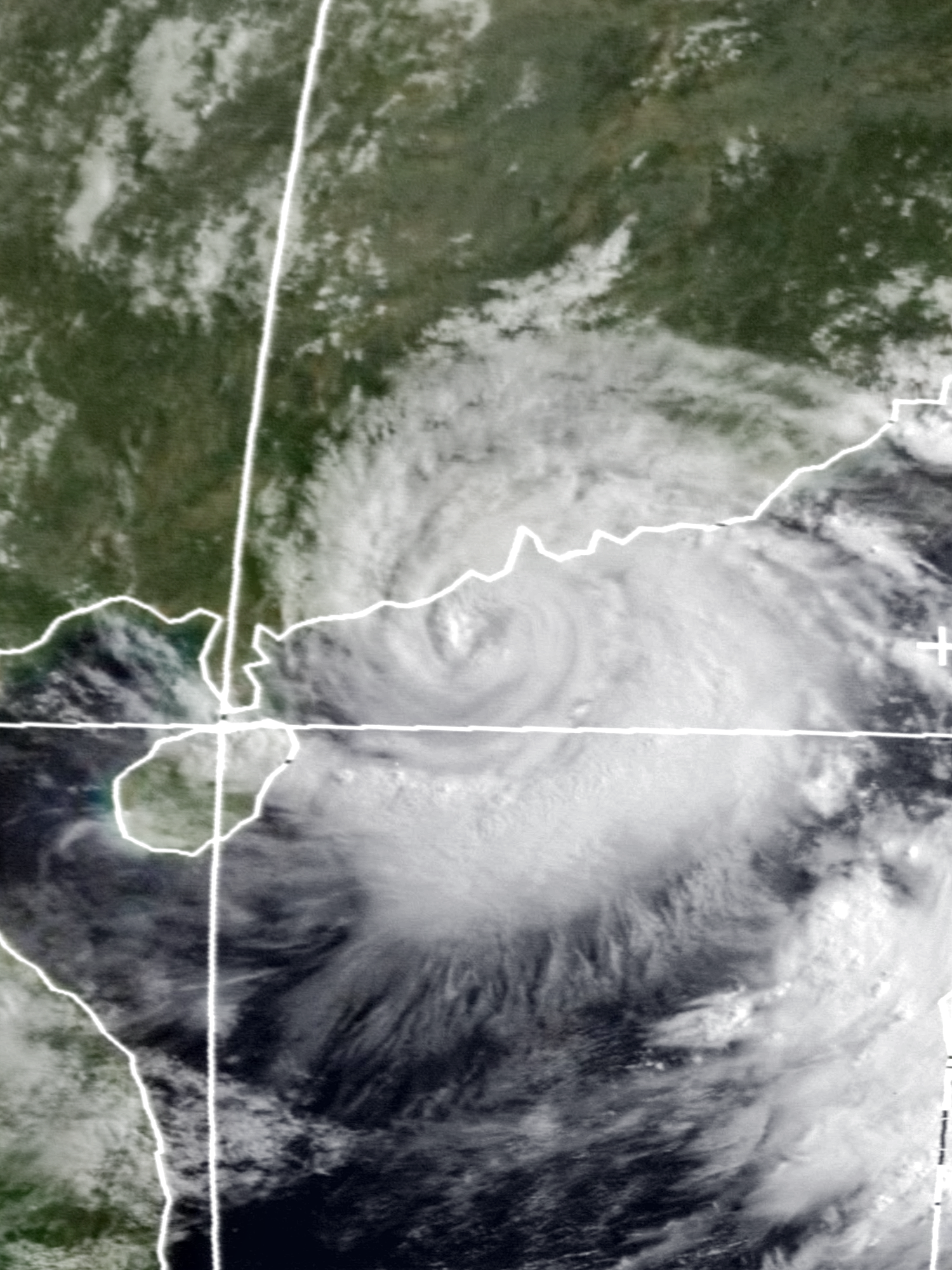
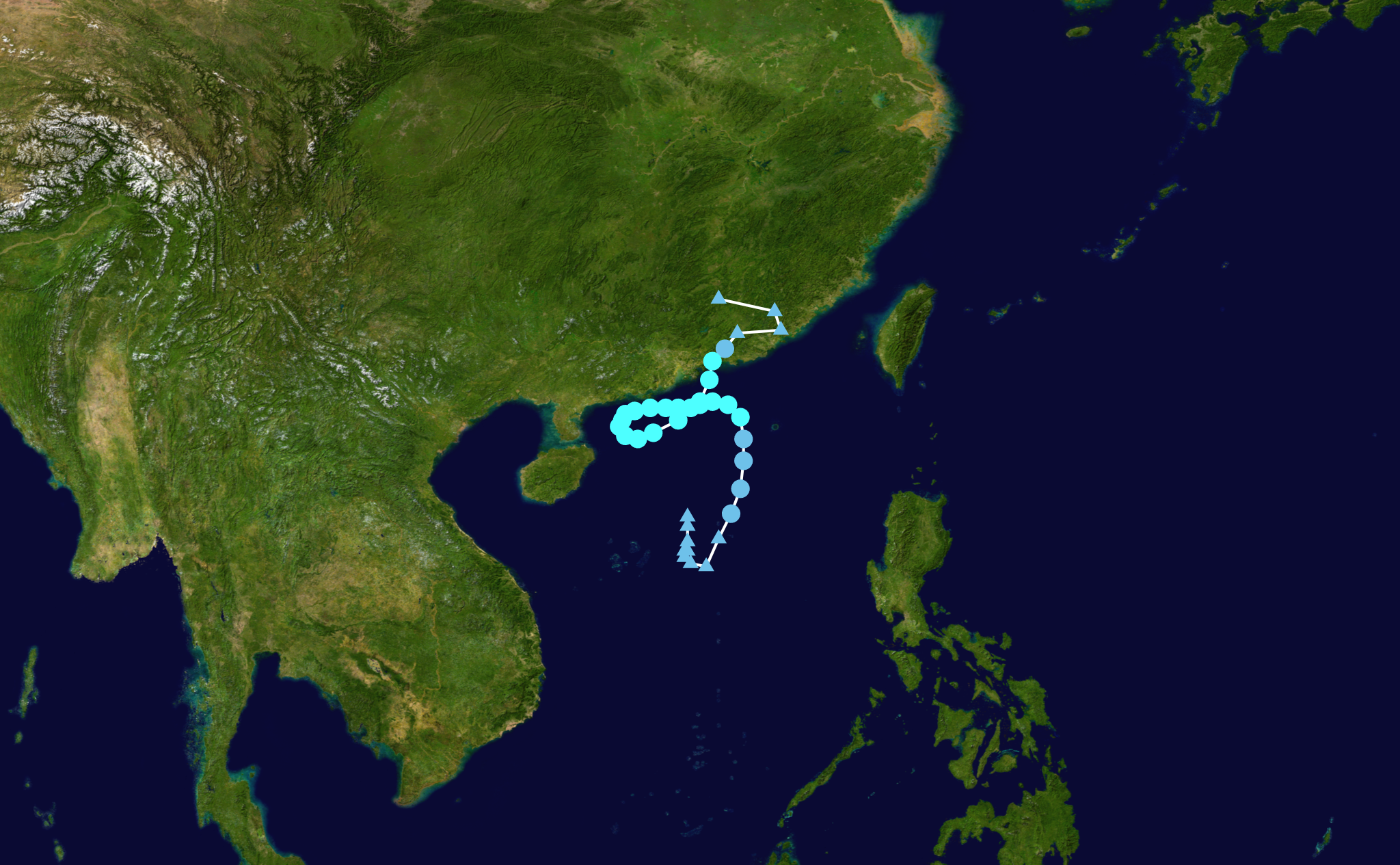
- Duration: July 24 – July 30
- Peak intensity: 100 km/h (65 mph) (10-min); 980 hPa (mbar)

Agnes formed on July 24, made a complete loop, and struck China on July 29 with winds of 55 mph after peaking at 65 mph. It dissipated the 30th. In Hong Kong Tropical Storm Agnes killed 3 people.

=== Tropical Storm Bonnie ===
- Tropical storm (JMA)
- Tropical storm (SSHWS)
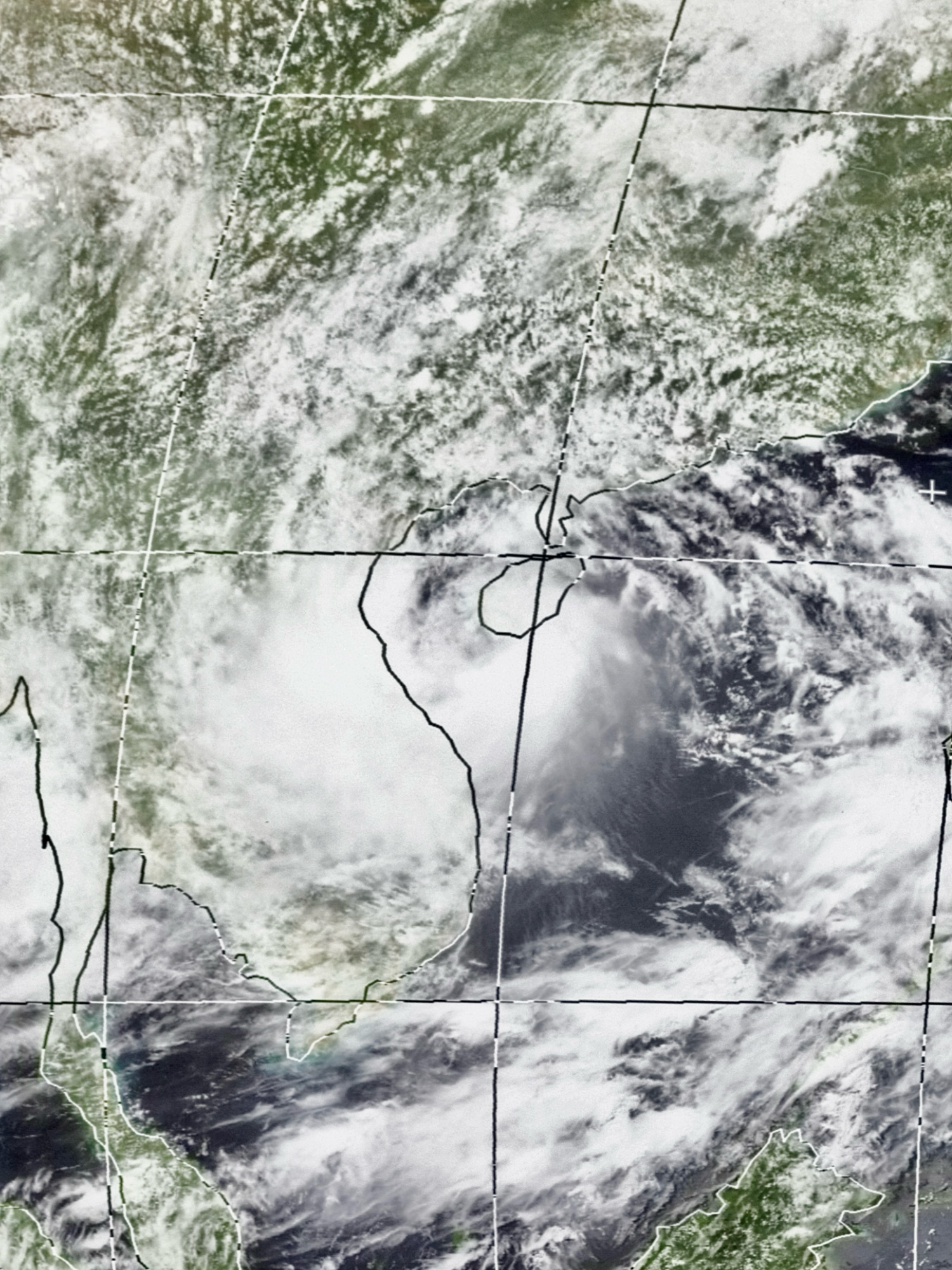
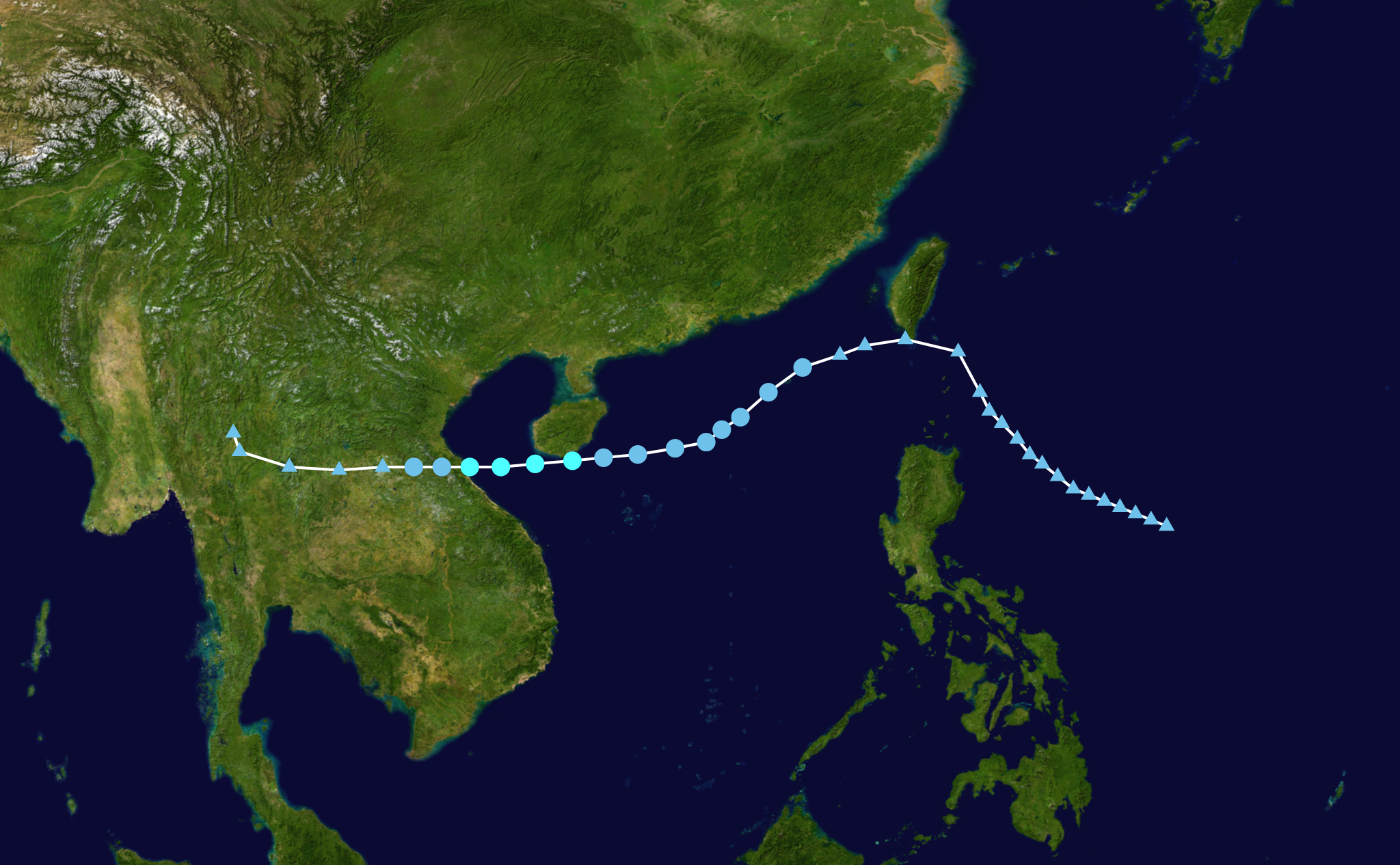
- Duration: August 8 – August 12
- Peak intensity: 75 km/h (45 mph) (10-min); 985 hPa (mbar)

Bonnie hit Vietnam.

=== Typhoon Carmen (Iliang) ===
- Typhoon (JMA)
- Category 1 typhoon (SSHWS)
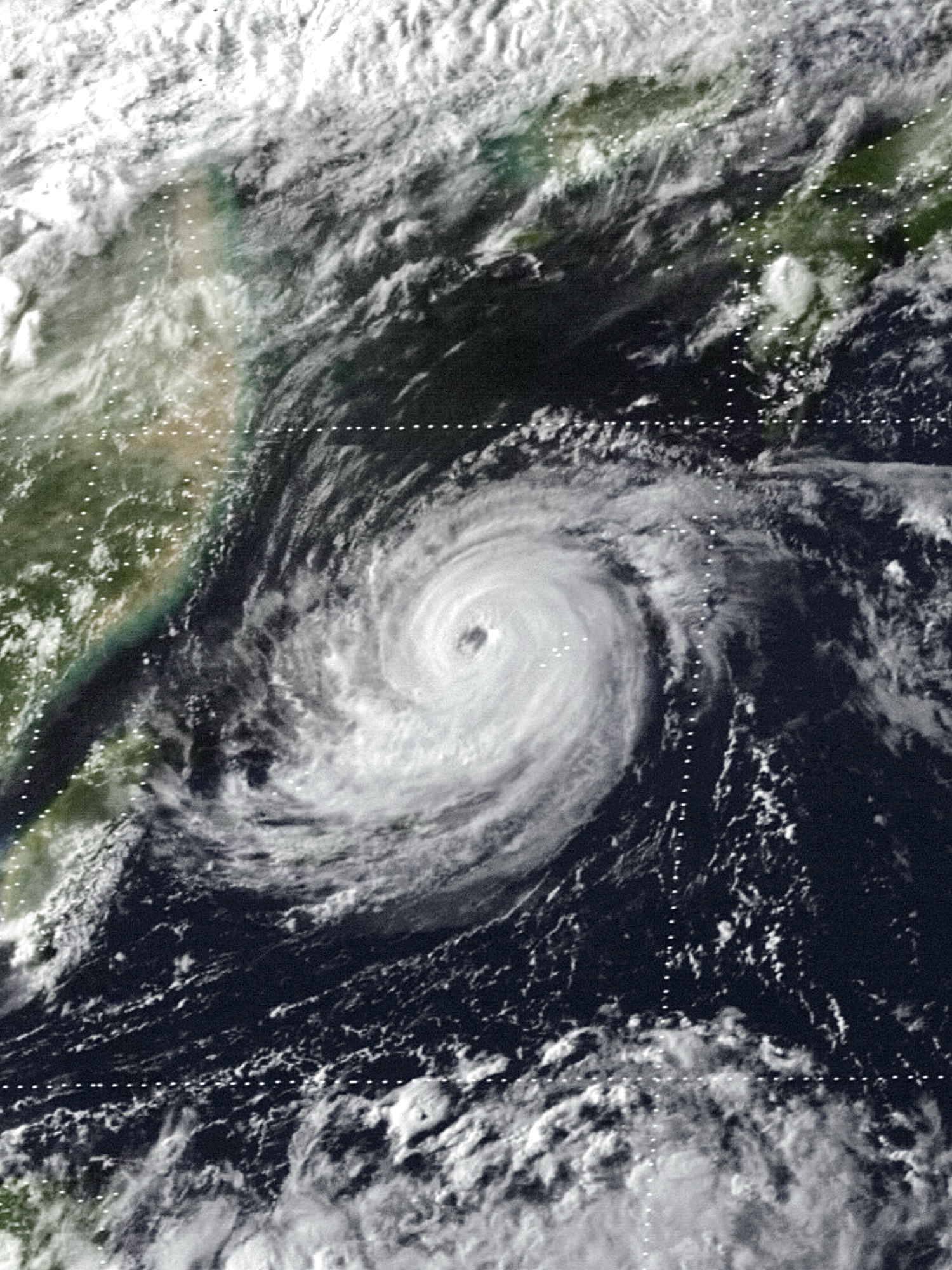
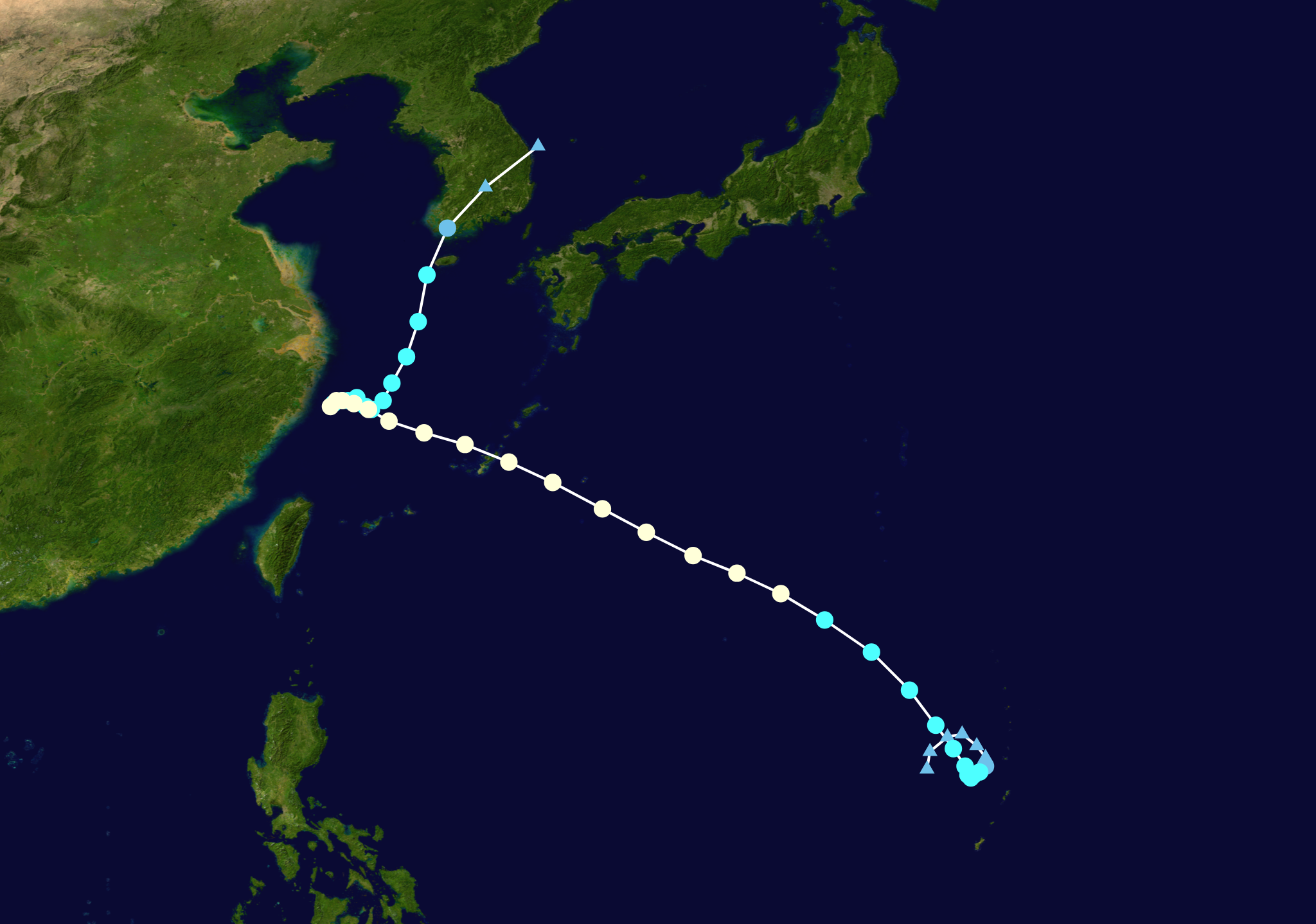
- Duration: August 10 – August 20
- Peak intensity: 140 km/h (85 mph) (10-min); 970 hPa (mbar)

On August 7, a deepening tropical upper tropospheric trough began interacting with a low-level monsoon trough, leading to an increase in convective activity from divergence aloft within the disturbance embedded. The low slowly consolidated over the next few days. On August 11, a reconnaissance aircraft reported a minimum central pressure of 992 mb, subsequently upgrading the disturbance to Tropical Storm Carmen. The storm initially took an erratic path before upper-level steering from southwesterlies east of the TUTT led to Carmen moving towards the north-northwest. Carmen continued to accelerate along this trajectory, reaching typhoon status on August 13 and eventually peaking as an 80 kt (90 mph) typhoon a few days later as Carmen’s structure became more symmetrical whilst having a small wind radii. By August 16, Carmen was caught in a col region of weak steering flow, causing it to once again move erratically just offshore mainland China. A shortwave trough developed over the Asian mainland which led to Carmen’s recurvature north-northeastwards. On August 20, Carmen made landfall in Jeonnam, South Korea as a weakening tropical storm, being downgraded to a remnant low shortly after.

Carmen was responsible for causing considerable damage over South Korea as it made landfall, such as widespread flooding that killed 21 people, and causing $3 million (1978 USD) in property damage. During Carmen’s formative stage, Saipan also reported property damage and flooding. However, little damage was reported when Carmen passed near Okinawa.

=== Tropical Storm Della (Heling) ===
- Tropical storm (JMA)
- Tropical storm (SSHWS)
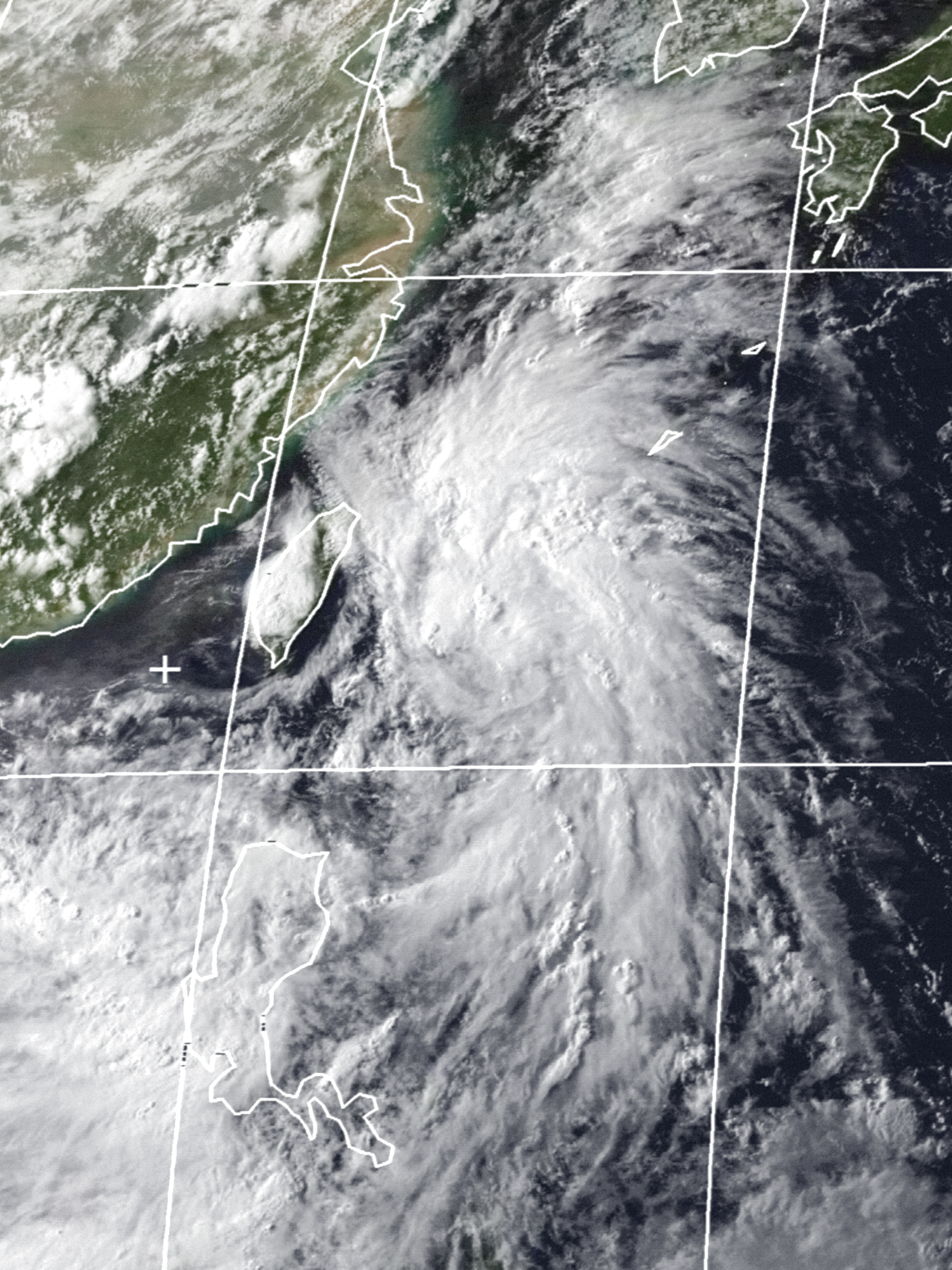
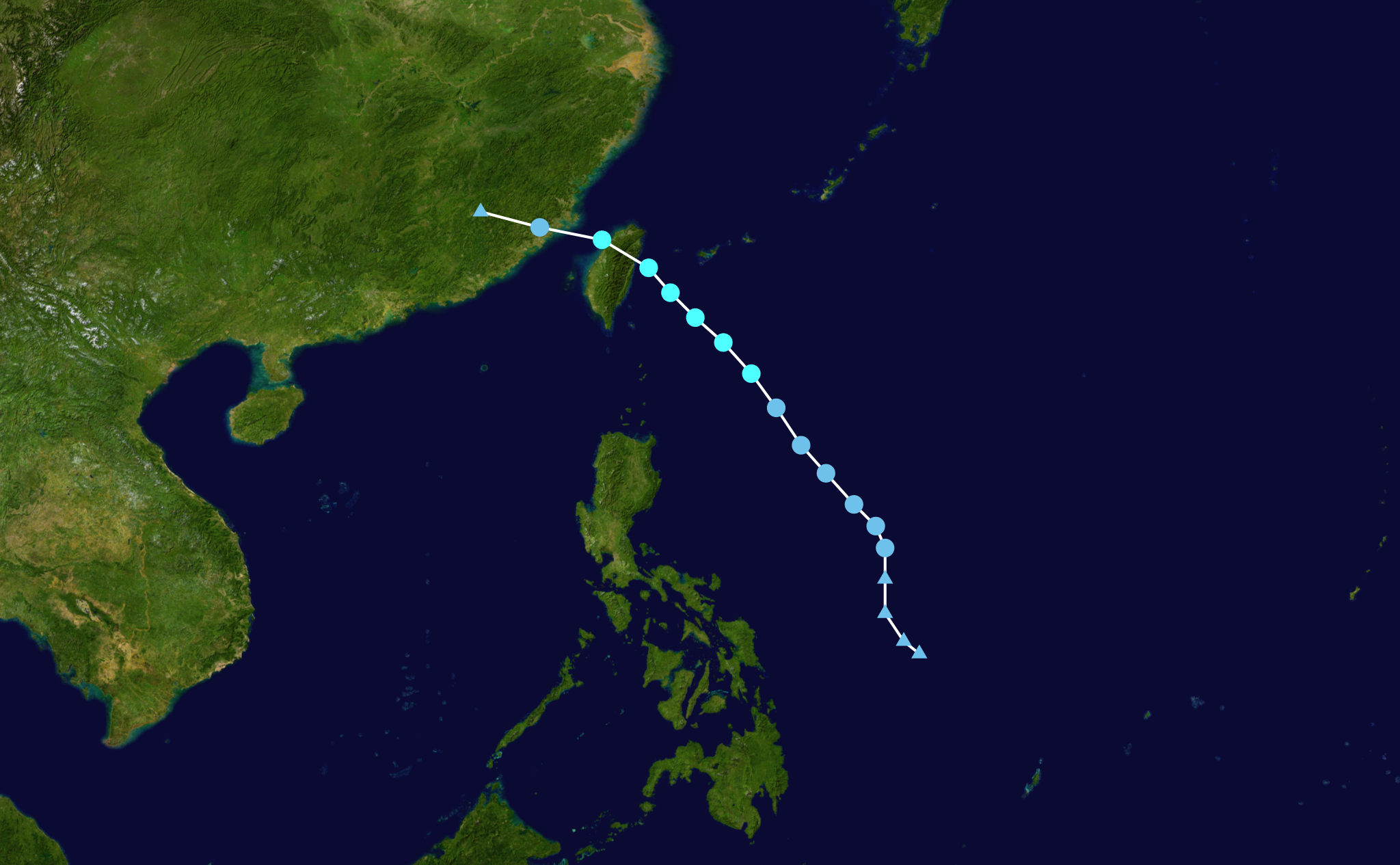
- Duration: August 10 – August 13
- Peak intensity: 85 km/h (50 mph) (10-min); 985 hPa (mbar)

Della made landfall in Taiwan and China.

=== Tropical Storm 13W ===
- Tropical storm (JMA)
- Tropical depression (SSHWS)
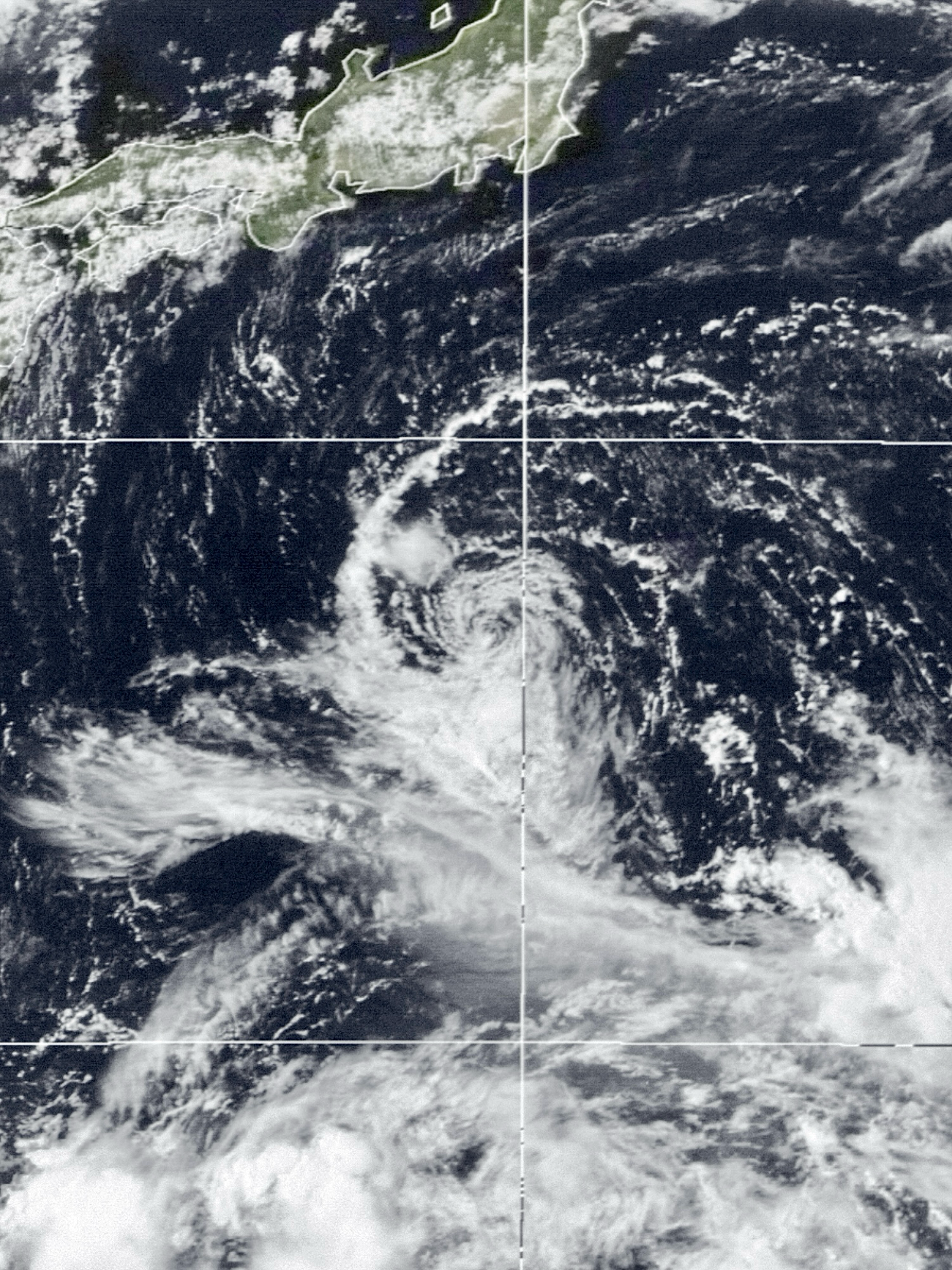
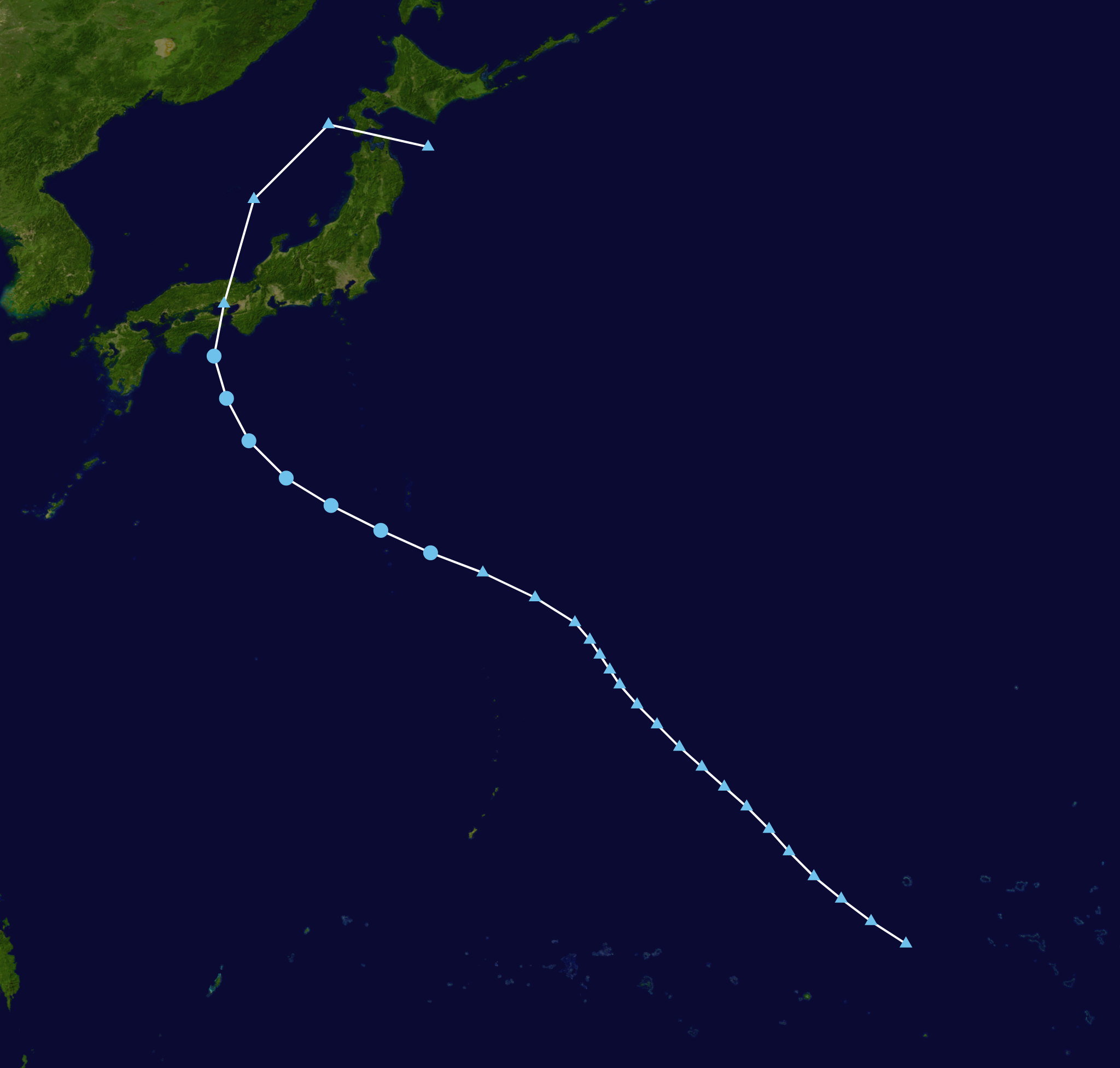
- Duration: August 14 – August 20
- Peak intensity: 75 km/h (45 mph) (10-min); 999 hPa (mbar)

13W was weak but hit Japan.

=== Typhoon Elaine (Miding) ===
- Typhoon (JMA)
- Category 1 typhoon (SSHWS)
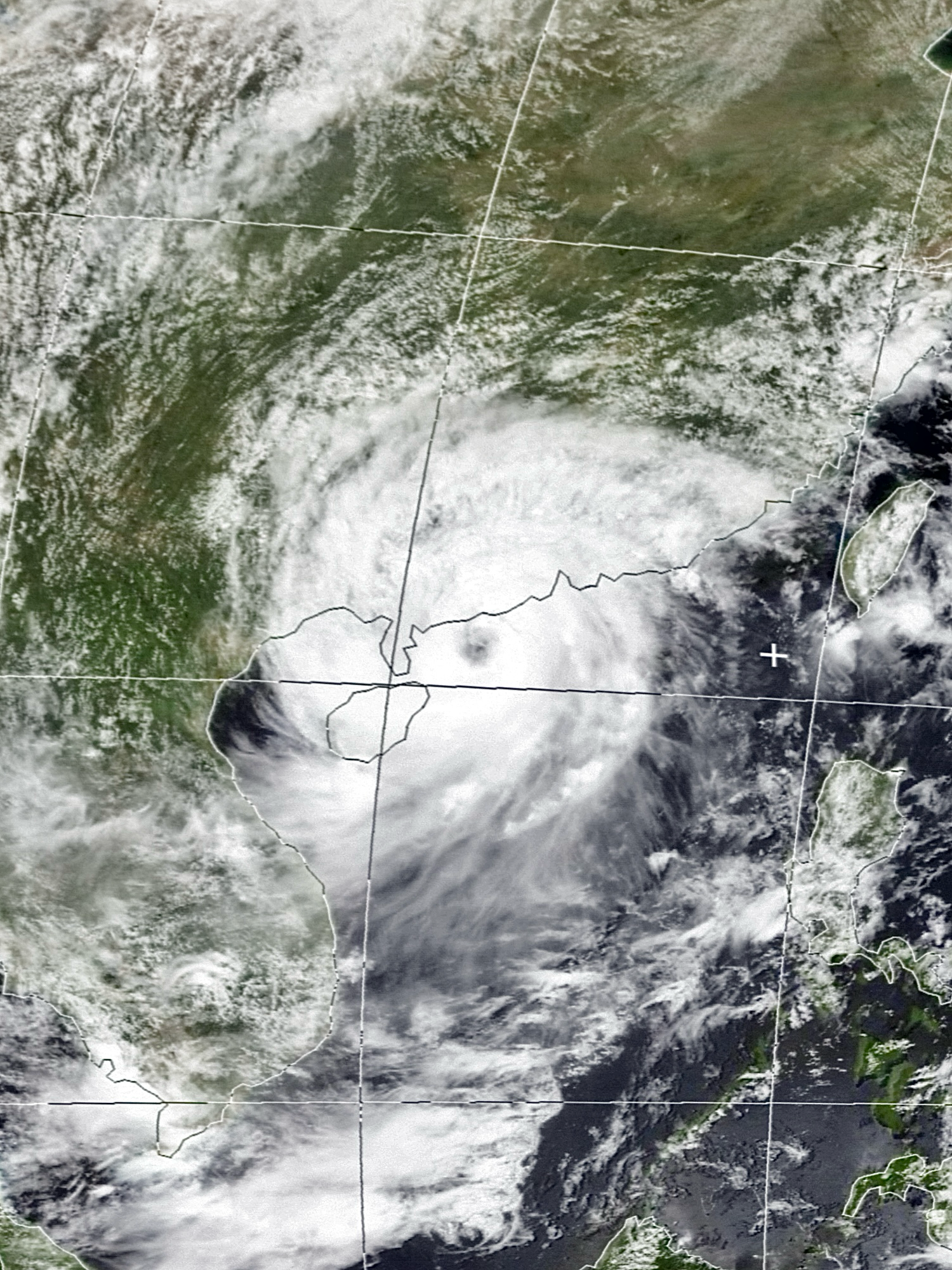
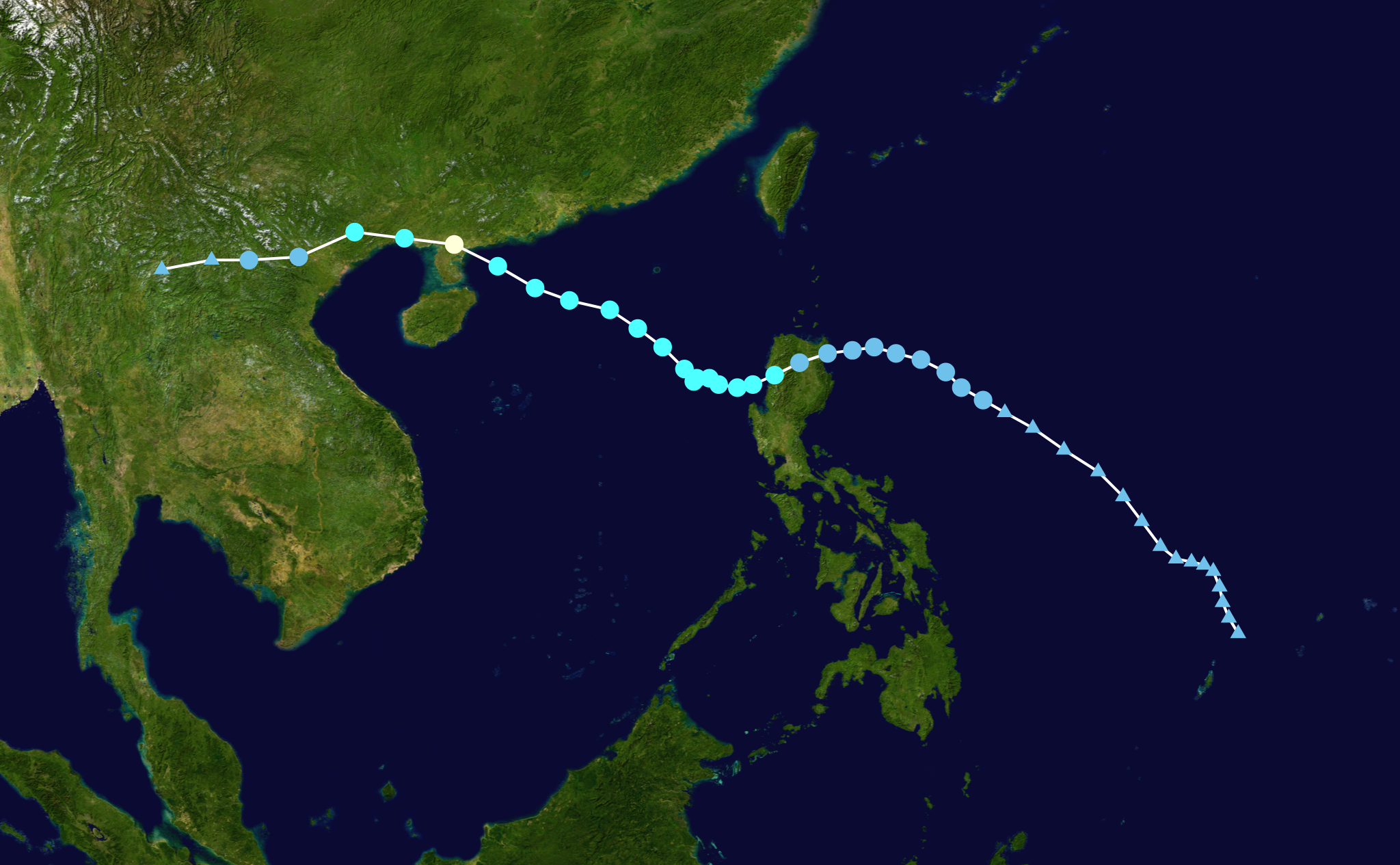
- Duration: August 18 – August 28
- Peak intensity: 120 km/h (75 mph) (10-min); 965 hPa (mbar)

A tropical disturbance within the monsoon trough was first noted on August 18 as it was gradually organizing to the northeast of Palau. However, strong upper-level wind shear inhibited development of the disturbance for the next few days. On August 21, though still rather disorganized, the disturbance strengthened into Tropical Depression 14, it later began moving towards the southeast from a mid-tropospheric ridge providing an east-northeasterly steering flow, where the depression made landfall over Luzon on August 23. Inland Luzon, depression continued to intensify, being upgraded to Tropical Storm Elaine shortly before entering the South China Sea. Between August 24–25, Elaine was caught between a region of strong southwesterly monsoon flow and strong northeasterly flow, causing the system to loop twice consecutively. As the same mid-tropospheric ridge began to migrate northwards, Elaine jogged to the northwest and was approaching the southern coast of China. On August 27, a ship reported surface winds of 65 kt, upgrading Elaine to typhoon status as it made landfall near the Leizhou Peninsula. After making landfall, Elaine rapidly degenerated into a remnant low, with final warnings being issued on August 28.

Elaine caused heavy damage in portions of northern Luzon after making landfall as a tropical depression. In Hong Kong, Signal 8SE warnings were issued as the storm inched closer towards China; despite making landfall as a typhoon, little damage was reported in Hong Kong although Elaine left one person dead and 51 others injured.

=== Typhoon Faye ===
- Very strong typhoon (JMA)
- Category 3 typhoon (SSHWS)
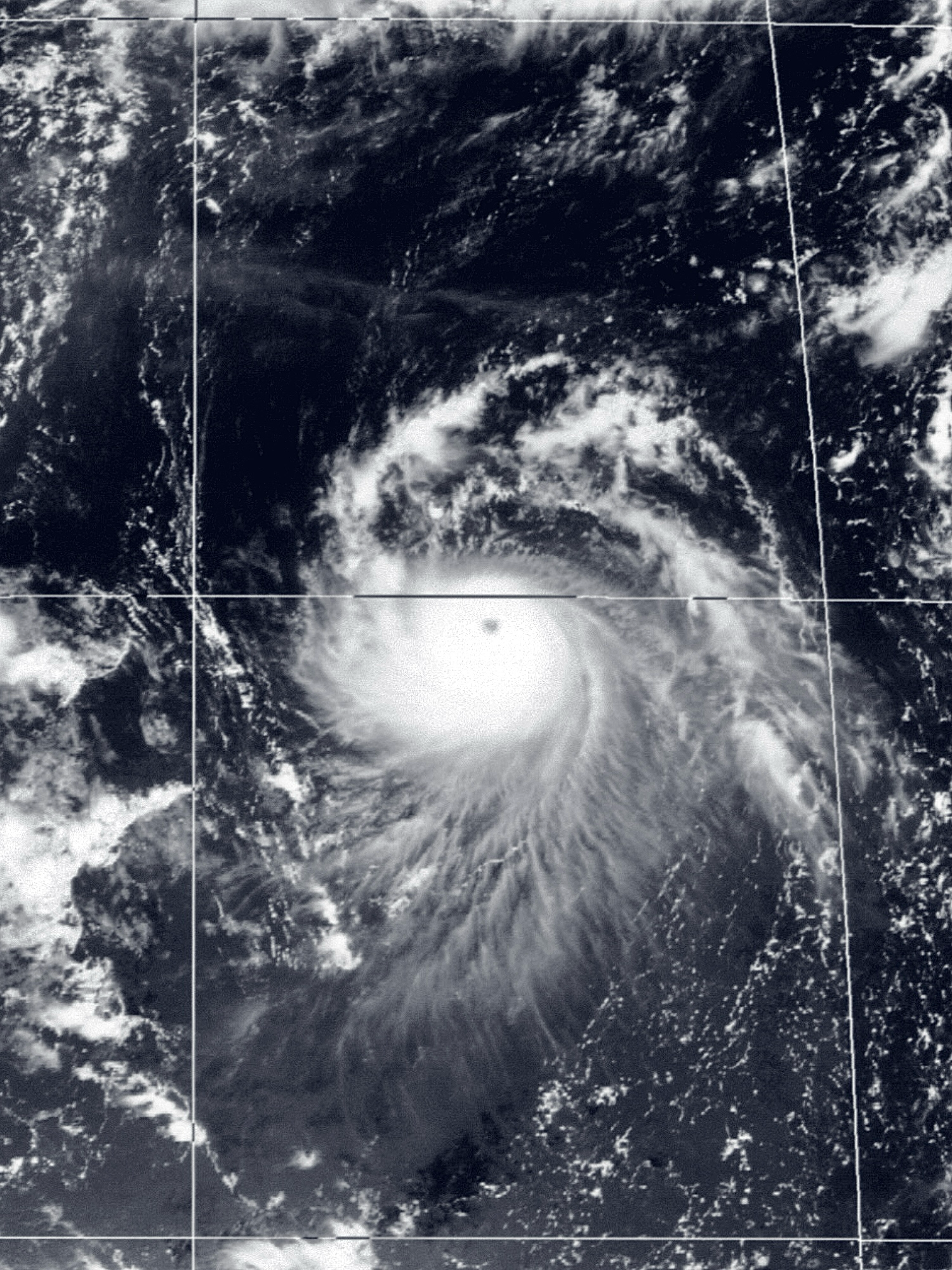
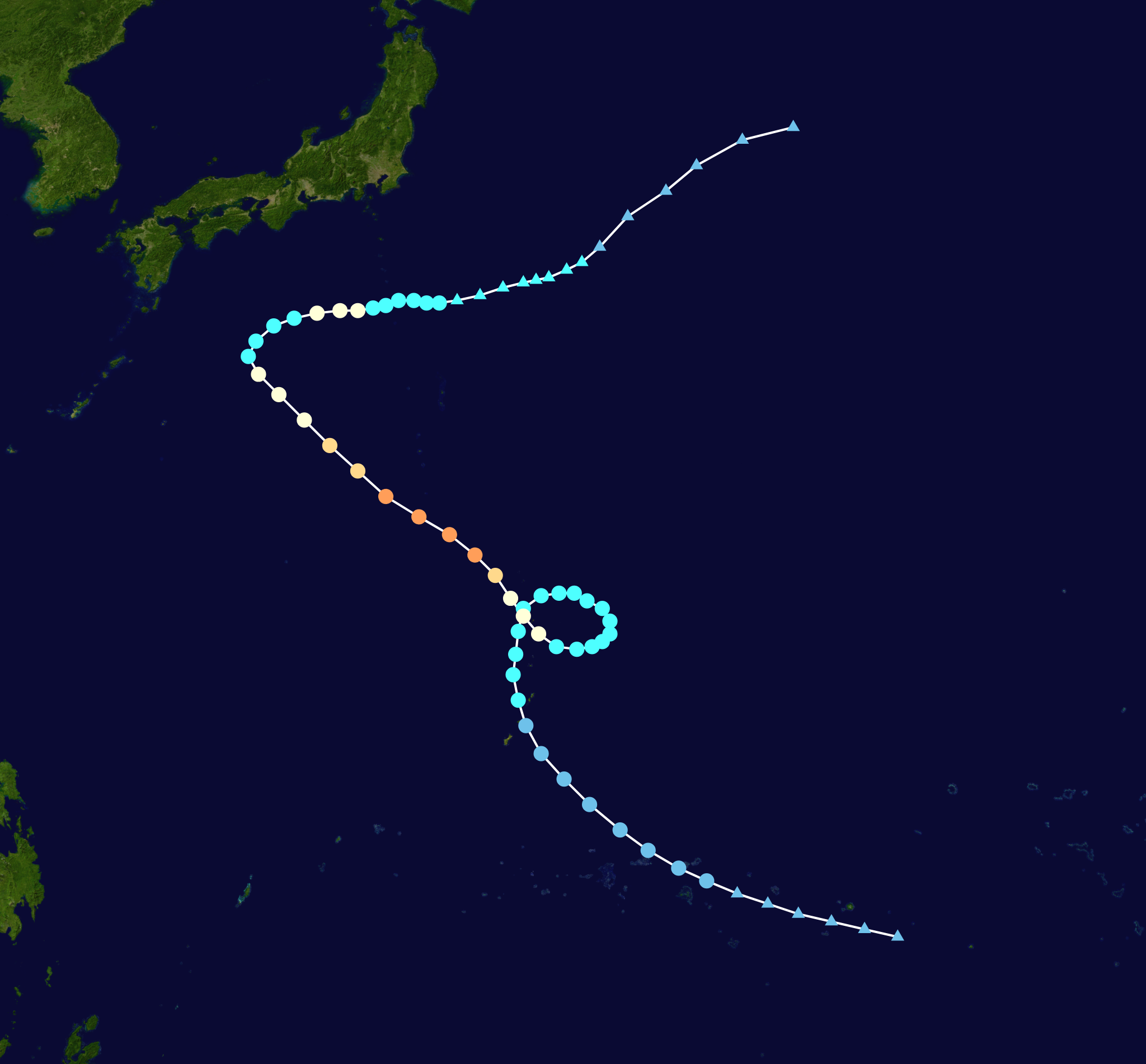
- Duration: August 25 – September 7
- Peak intensity: 165 km/h (105 mph) (10-min); 935 hPa (mbar)

A tropical disturbance was first noted by a reconnaissance aircraft southeast of Ponape on August 24, gradually moving west-northwestwards as a tropical upper tropospheric trough (TUTT) with an embedded low northwest of the disturbance provided a diffluent upper-level outflow pattern. On August 28, reconnaissance confirmed a closed surface circulation with a minimum central pressure of 1000 mb, prompting its upgrade to Tropical Depression 16, strengthening into Tropical Storm Faye a few hours later. Faye proceeded to gradually strengthen as nearby Tropical Storms Gloria and Hester began to elongate the monsoon trough, causing Faye to complete a rare anticyclonic loop while wedged in a col region between two anticyclones near Marcus Island and south of Guam. On September 1, Faye underwent quick intensification and was upgraded to typhoon status after observations reported a poorly defined eye and a central pressure of 984 mb. The storm turned northwestward the next day as a longwave trough dominated the western Pacific, eventually peaking as a strong Category 3-equivalent typhoon. Faye then gradually weakened and was downgraded to tropical storm status on September 4. However, reconnaissance reported a pressure drop to 975 mb and improved cloud structure, prompting a brief re-upgrade to typhoon status on September 5 due to weak mid- to upper-level winds. Increasing vertical wind shear though subsequently caused weakening, and Faye completed extratropical transition late on September 7.

Though Faye stayed relatively out at sea, it caused damage over the Northern Mariana Islands. During its anticyclonic loop, the islands of Agrihan, Alamagan and Pagan were affected twice, the latter island experiencing the most damage with sixty-five homes being destroyed and one merchant vessel being grounded.

=== Tropical Storm Gloria (Norming) ===
- Tropical storm (JMA)
- Tropical storm (SSHWS)
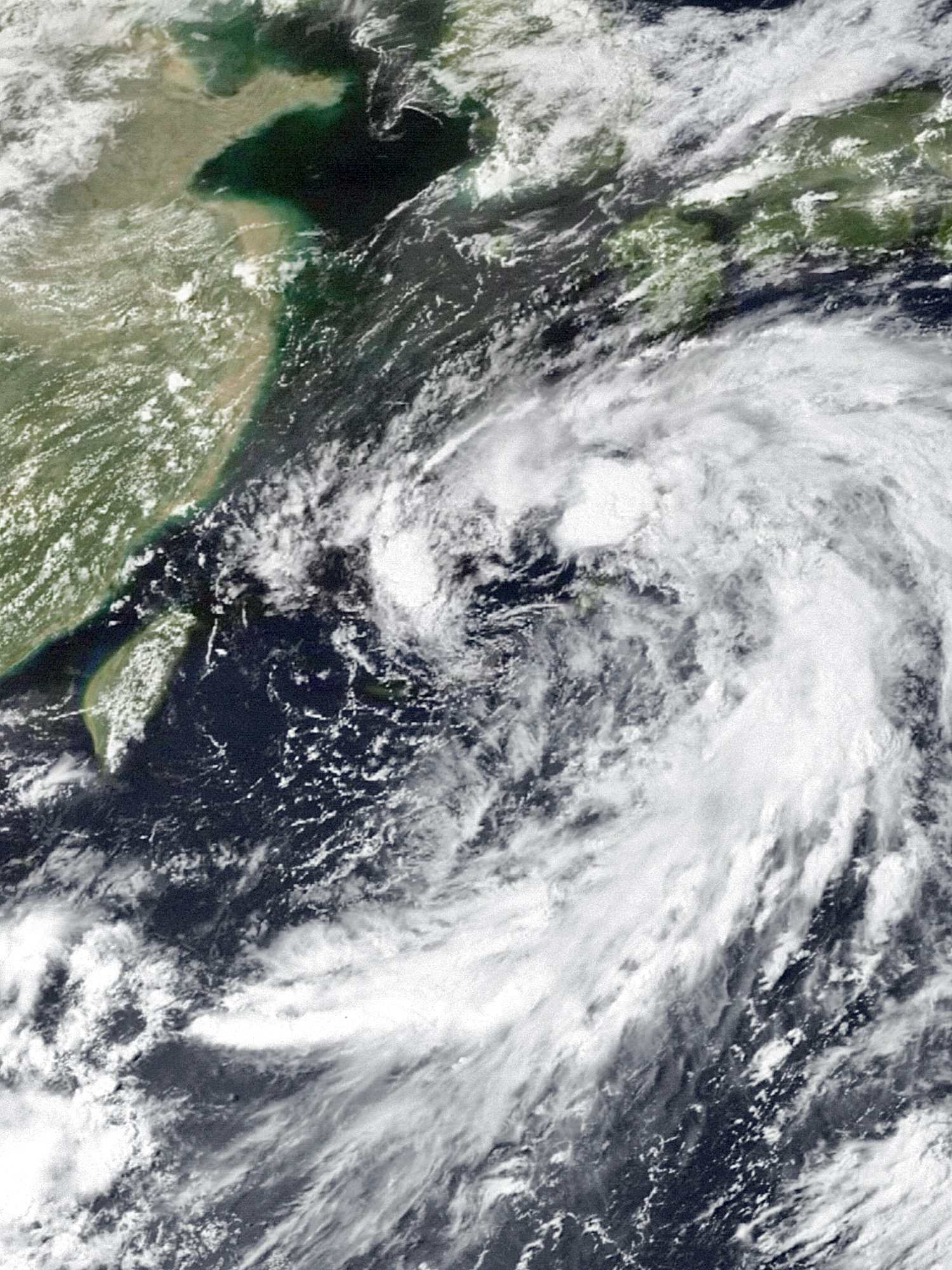
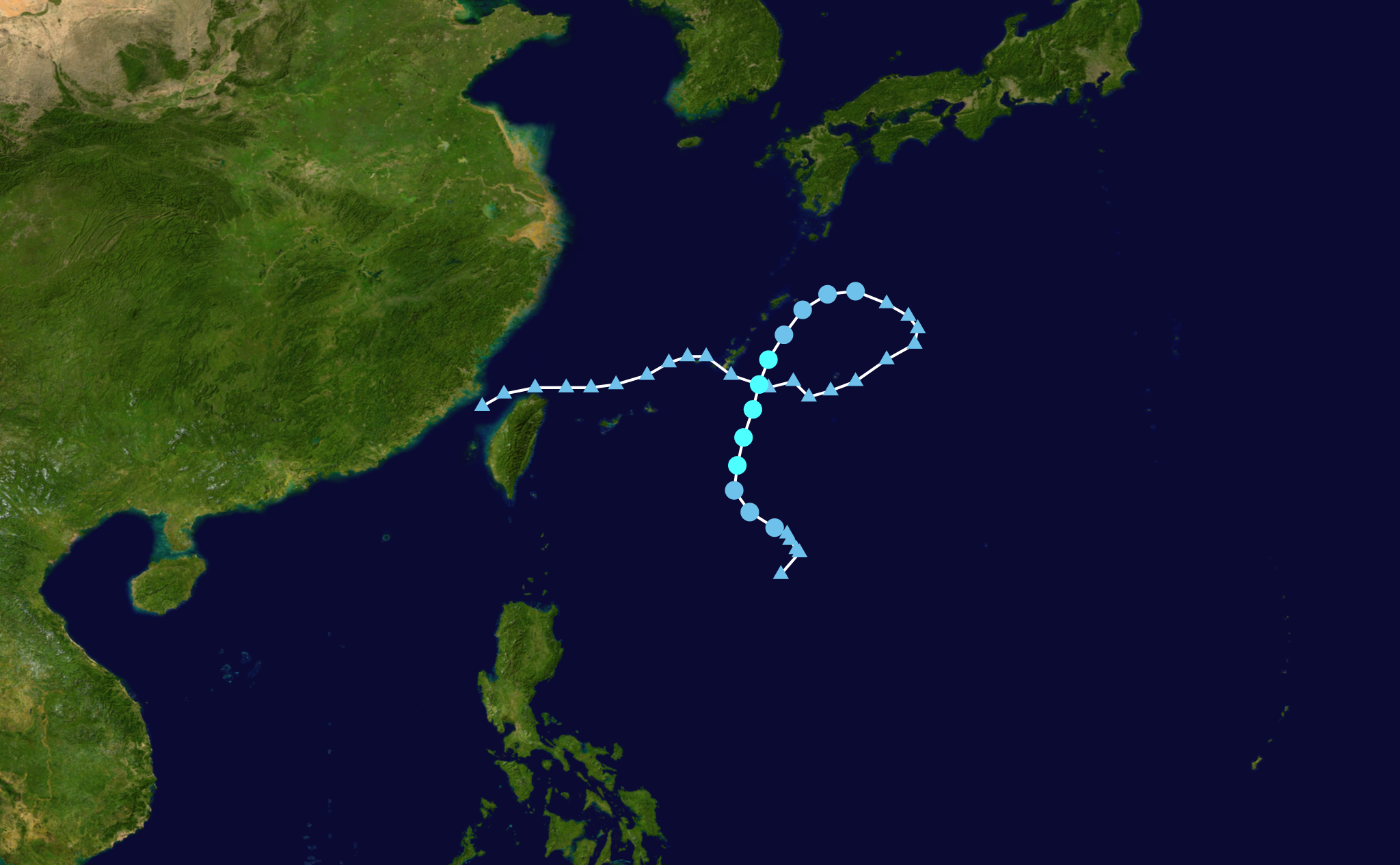
- Duration: August 28 – August 31
- Peak intensity: 75 km/h (45 mph) (10-min); 992 hPa (mbar)

Gloria stayed at sea.

=== Tropical Storm Hester ===
- Tropical storm (JMA)
- Tropical storm (SSHWS)
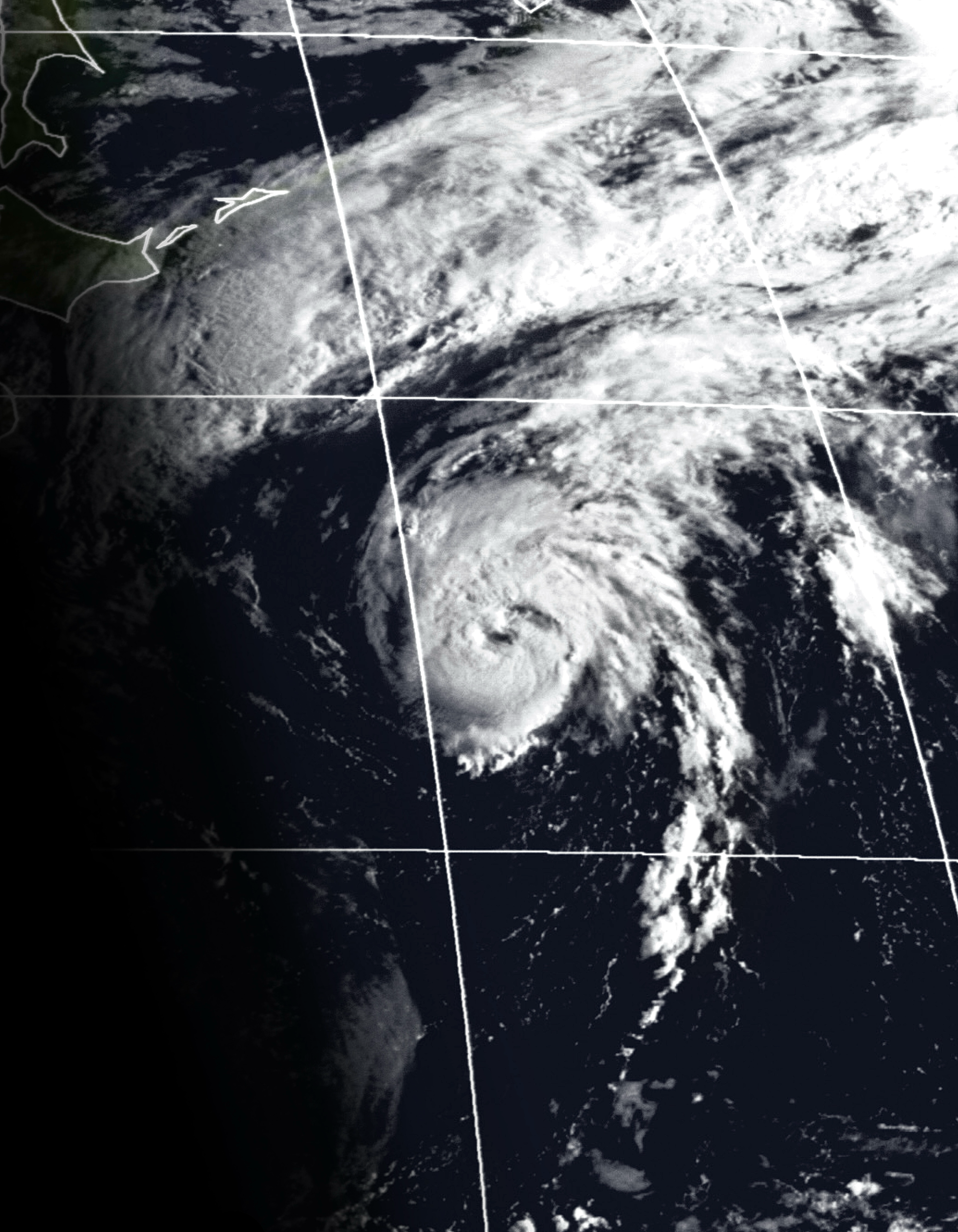
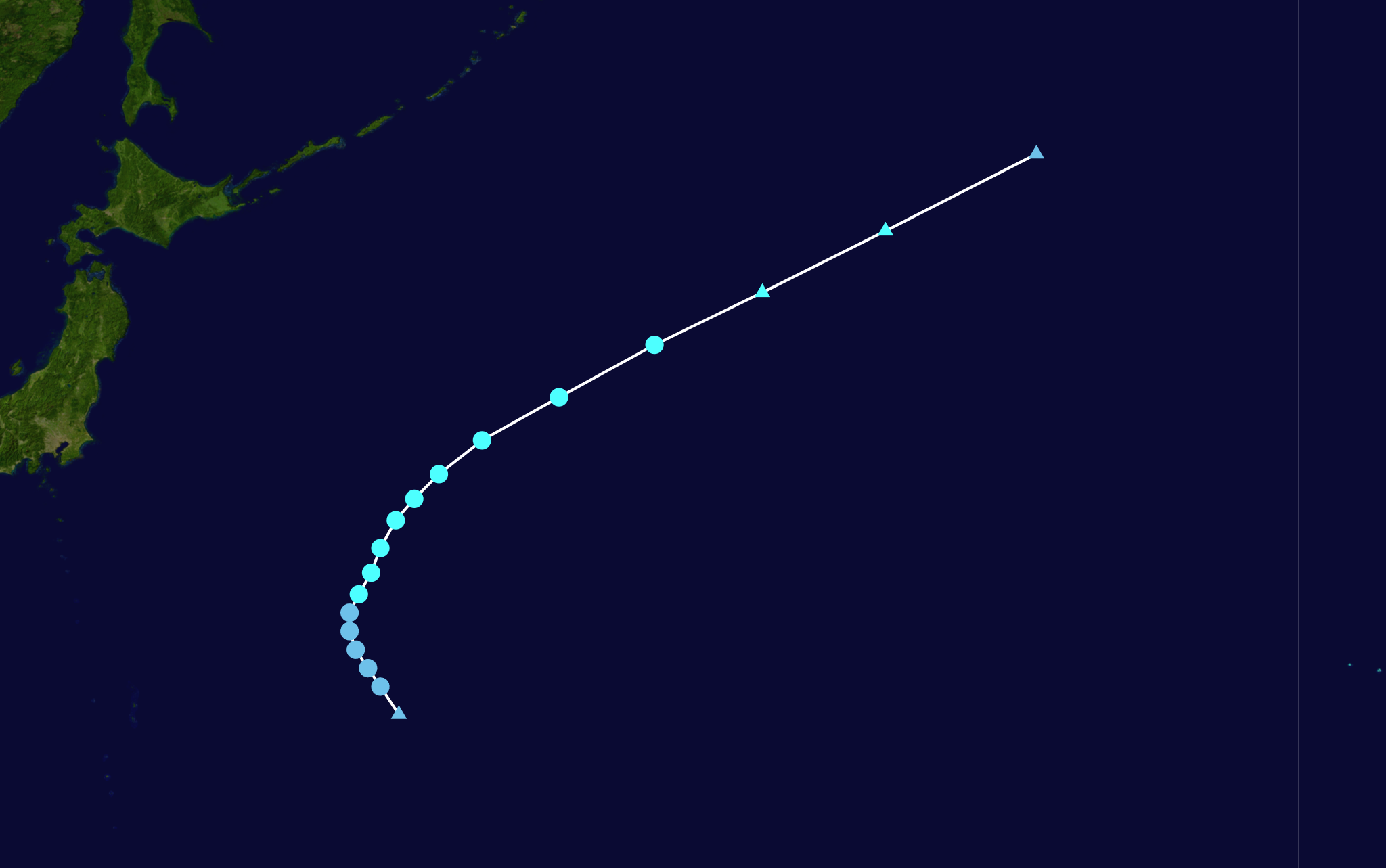
- Duration: August 28 – September 1
- Peak intensity: 85 km/h (50 mph) (10-min); 990 hPa (mbar)

Hester stayed away from land.

=== Typhoon Irma (Ruping) ===
- Typhoon (JMA)
- Category 1 typhoon (SSHWS)
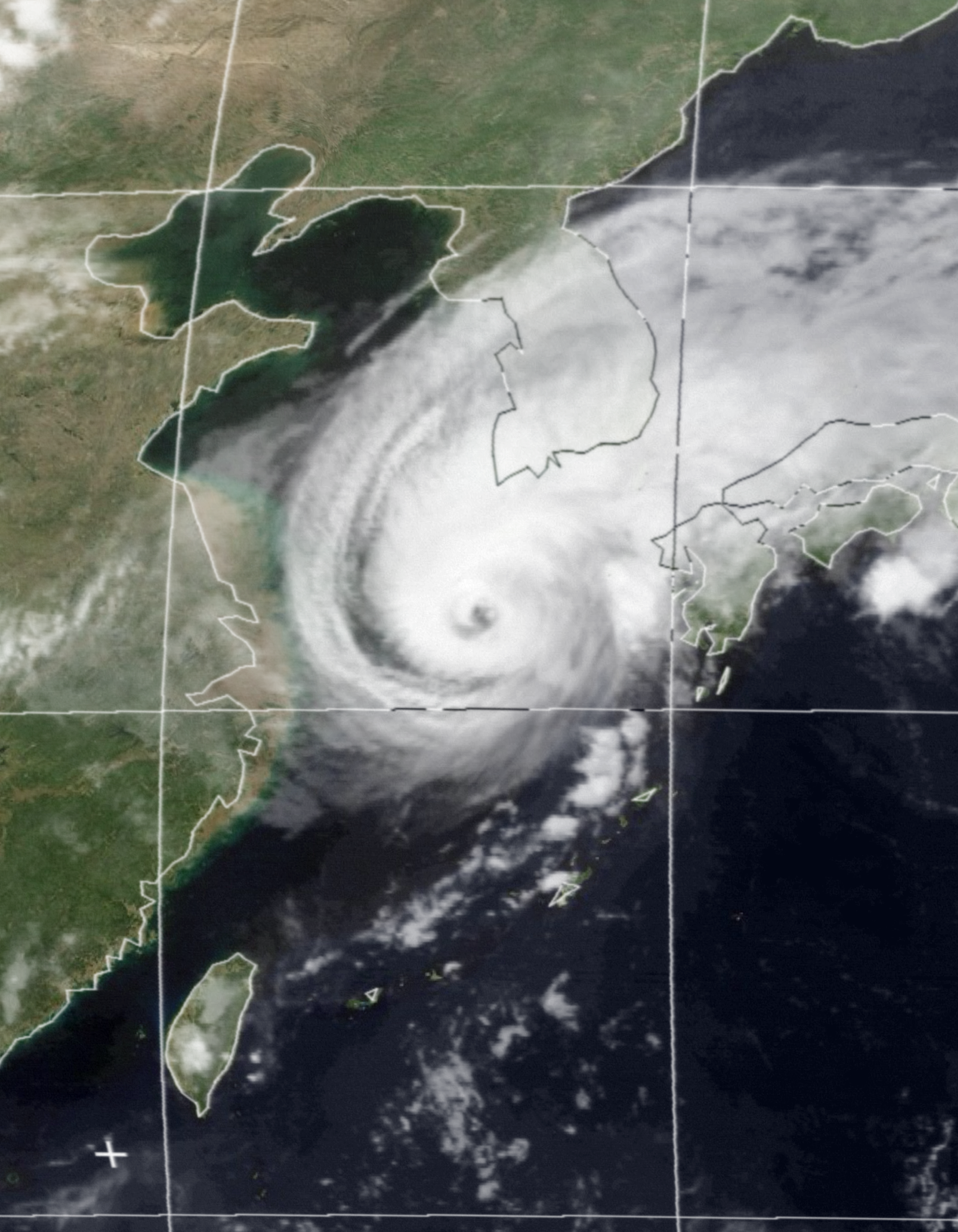
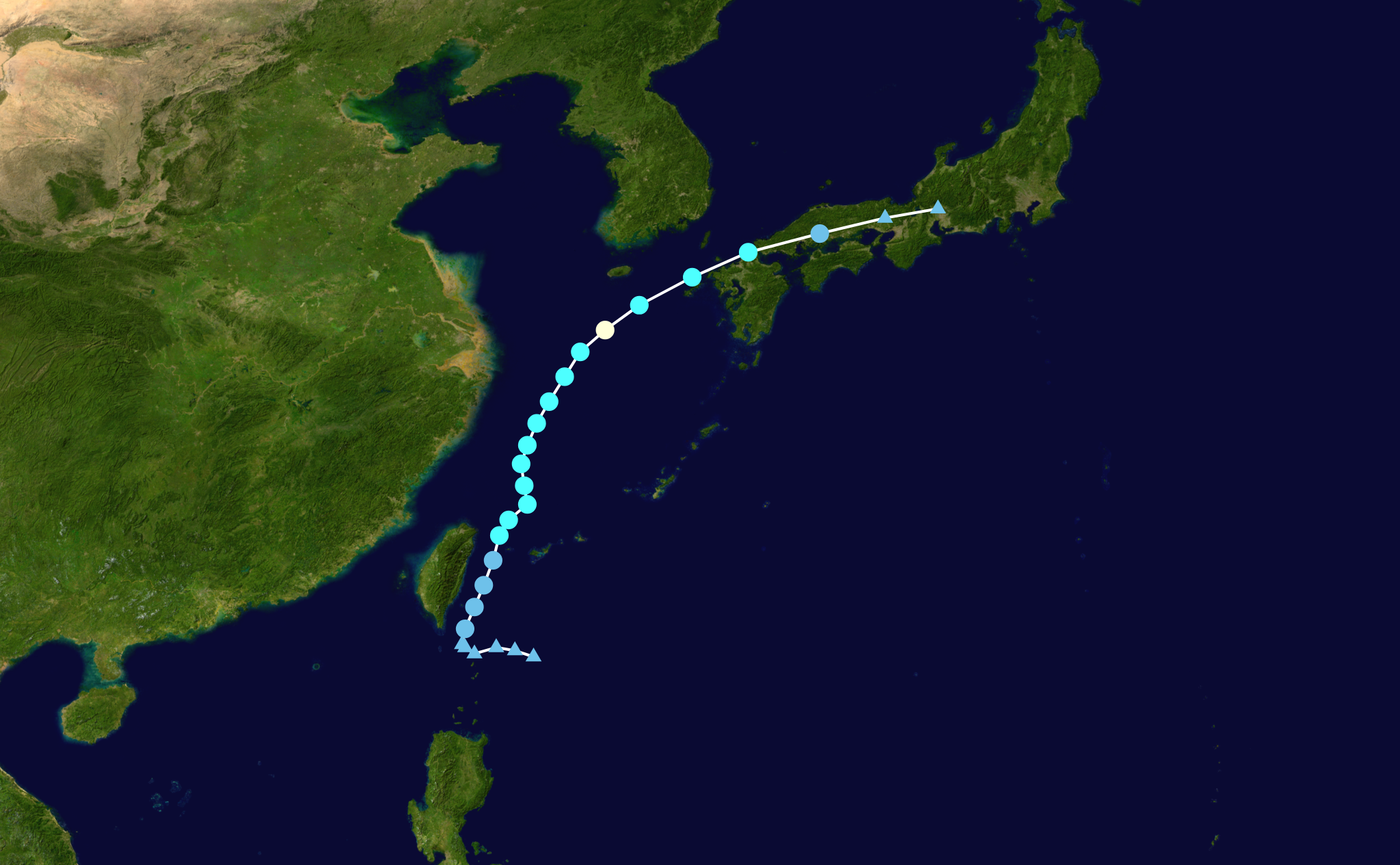
- Duration: September 9 – September 15
- Peak intensity: 120 km/h (75 mph) (10-min); 970 hPa (mbar)

Irma, the eighth typhoon of the 1978 season, developed in the monsoon trough southeast of Taiwan. It made landfall in Honshu, Japan. With winds of up to 120 km/h, Typhoon Irma killed at least 6 people and made about 3,000 homeless. Four people were missing and about 100 were injured by floods and landslides in southwestern Japan. It destroyed or damaged 1,597 homes and left 6,266 homes flooded. Irma smashed windows, overturned cars, and capsized several fishing boats. Several athletes at the Japan-China Friendship Track and Field Meet in Kitakyushu were injured when a freak gust blew them ten feet in the air. A Liberian-registered tanker was swept from its moorings off the port of Kure and drifted for nearly 5 kilometers before running aground off a small island in the Inland Sea. Irma remained a typhoon for only 12 hours becoming the shortest-lived typhoon of the season.

=== Typhoon Judy ===
- Typhoon (JMA)
- Category 2 typhoon (SSHWS)
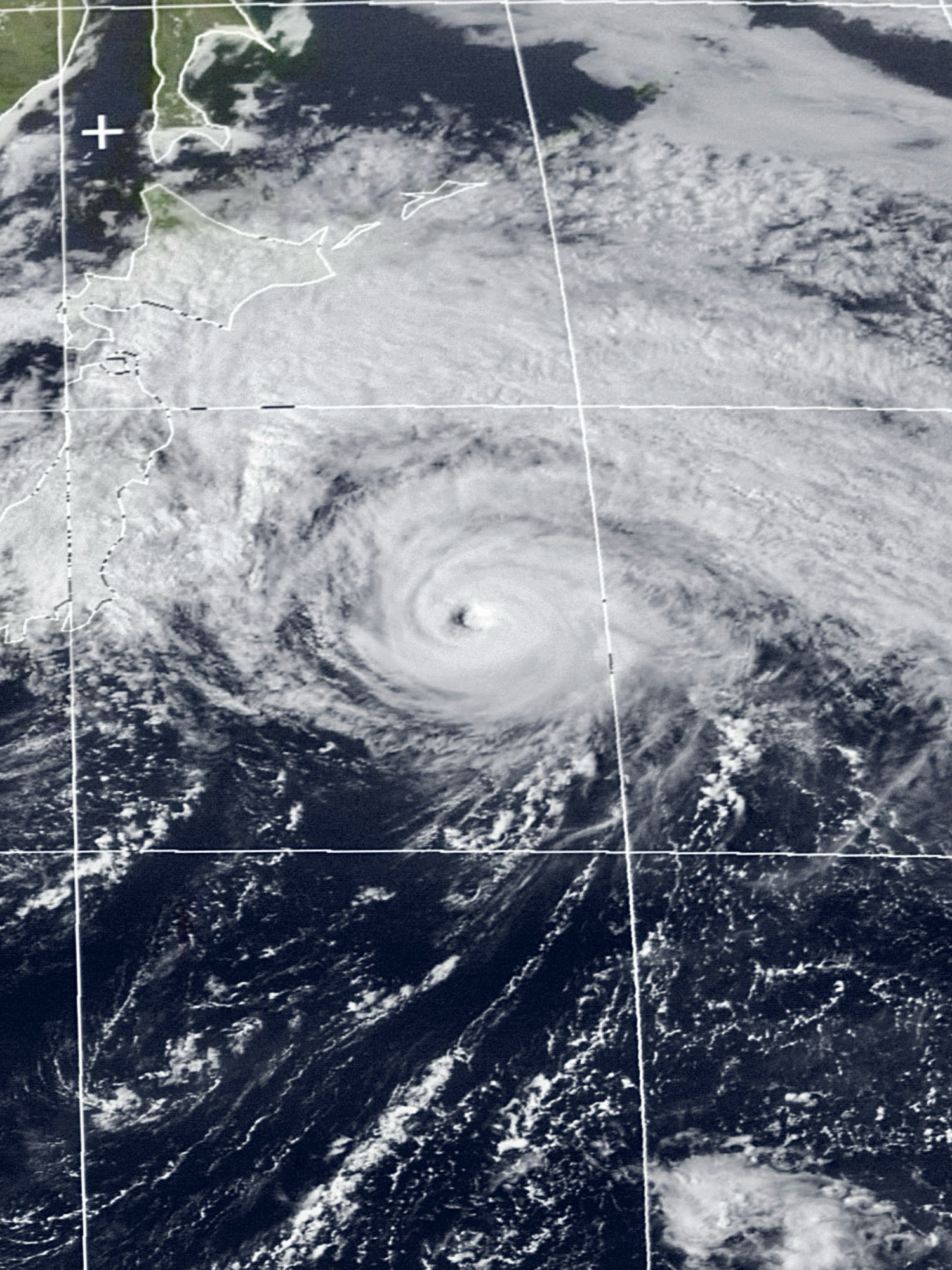
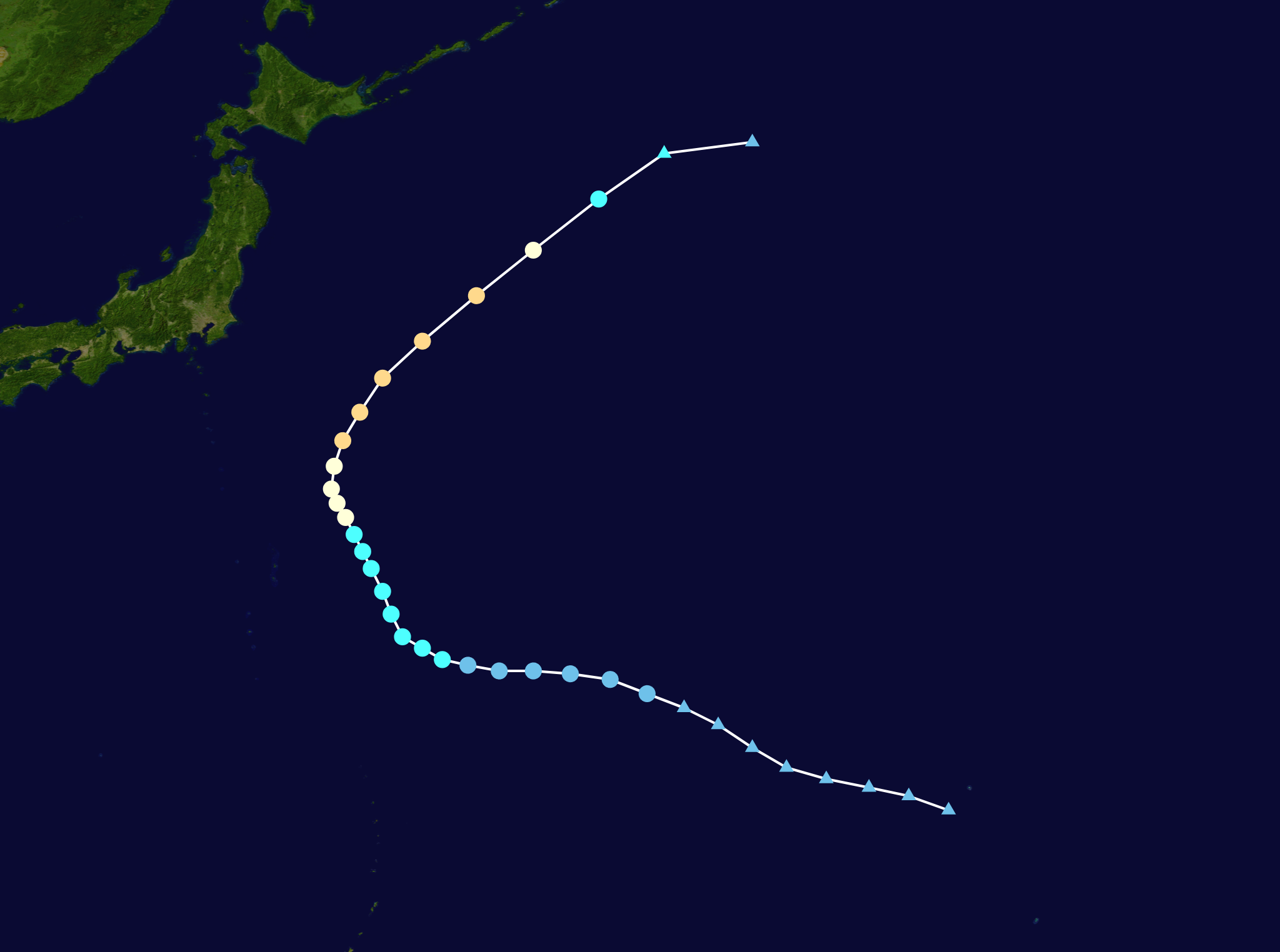
- Duration: September 9 – September 17
- Peak intensity: 150 km/h (90 mph) (10-min); 950 hPa (mbar)

Judy did not impact land.

=== Severe Tropical Storm Kit (Uding) ===
- Severe tropical storm (JMA)
- Tropical storm (SSHWS)
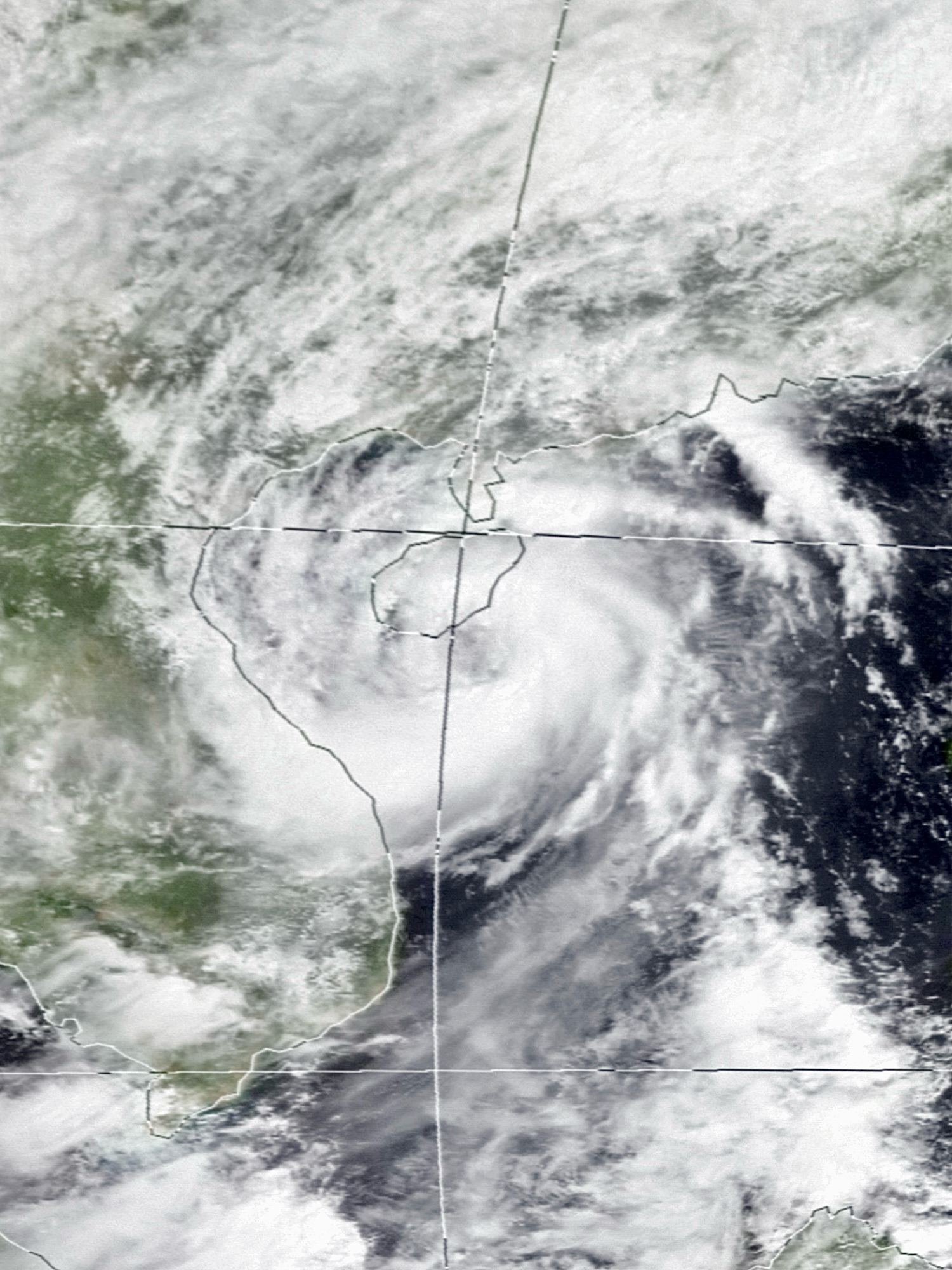
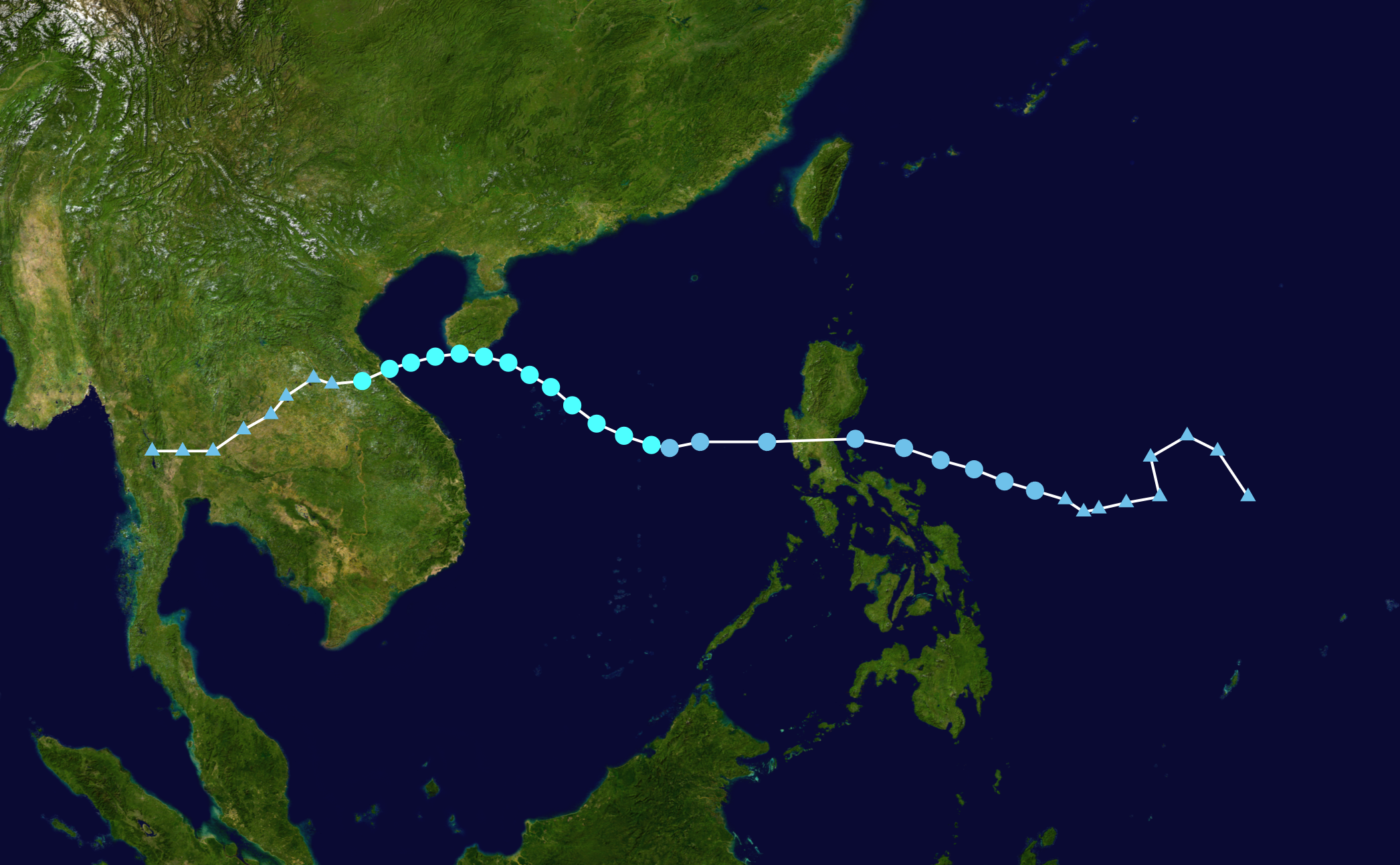
- Duration: September 20 – September 26
- Peak intensity: 95 km/h (60 mph) (10-min); 990 hPa (mbar)

Kit hit Vietnam and The Philippines.

=== Typhoon Lola (Weling) ===
- Typhoon (JMA)
- Category 1 typhoon (SSHWS)
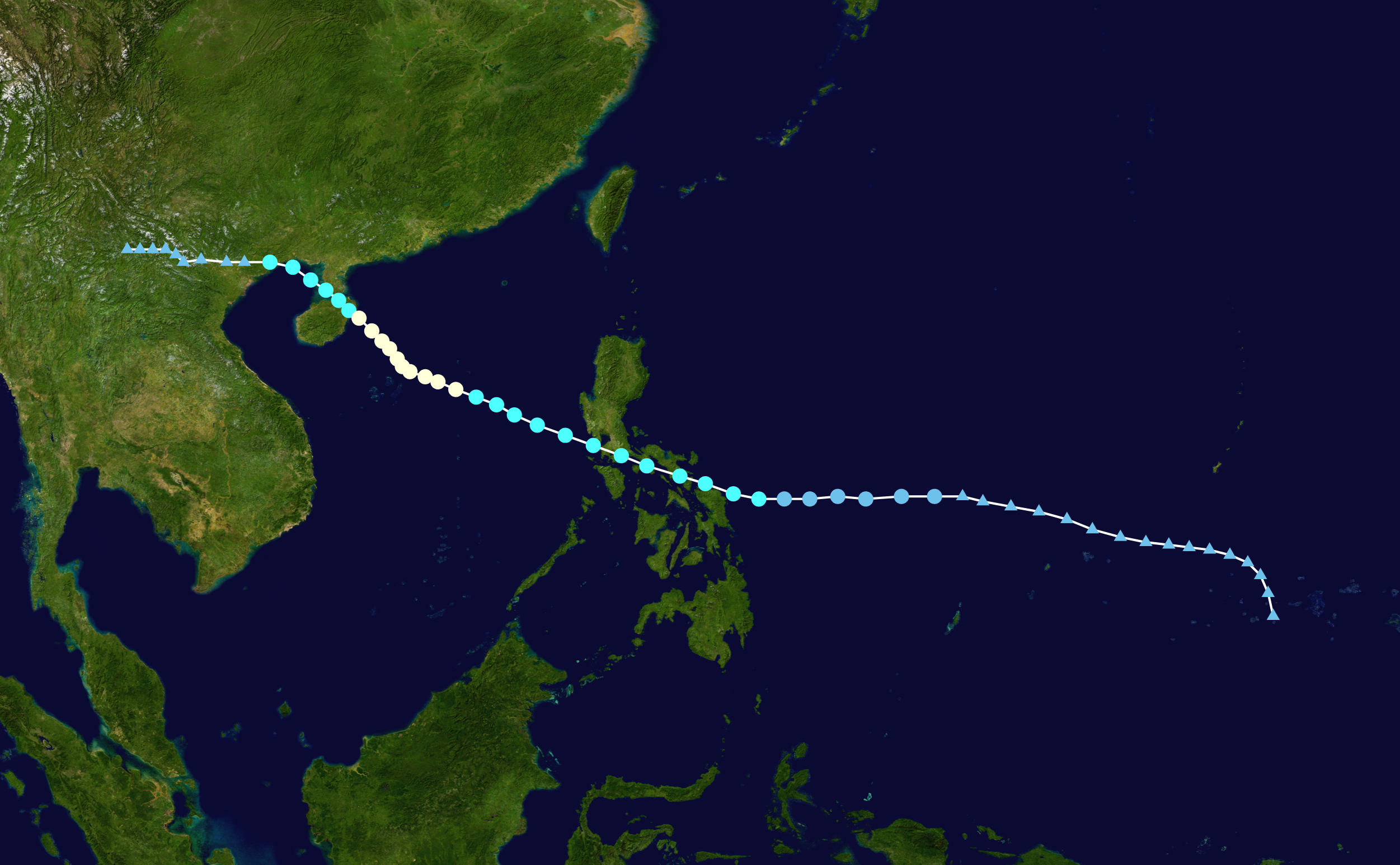
- Duration: September 20 – October 2
- Peak intensity: 130 km/h (80 mph) (10-min); 965 hPa (mbar)

Lola hit China and the Philippines.

=== Typhoon Mamie ===
- Typhoon (JMA)
- Category 1 typhoon (SSHWS)
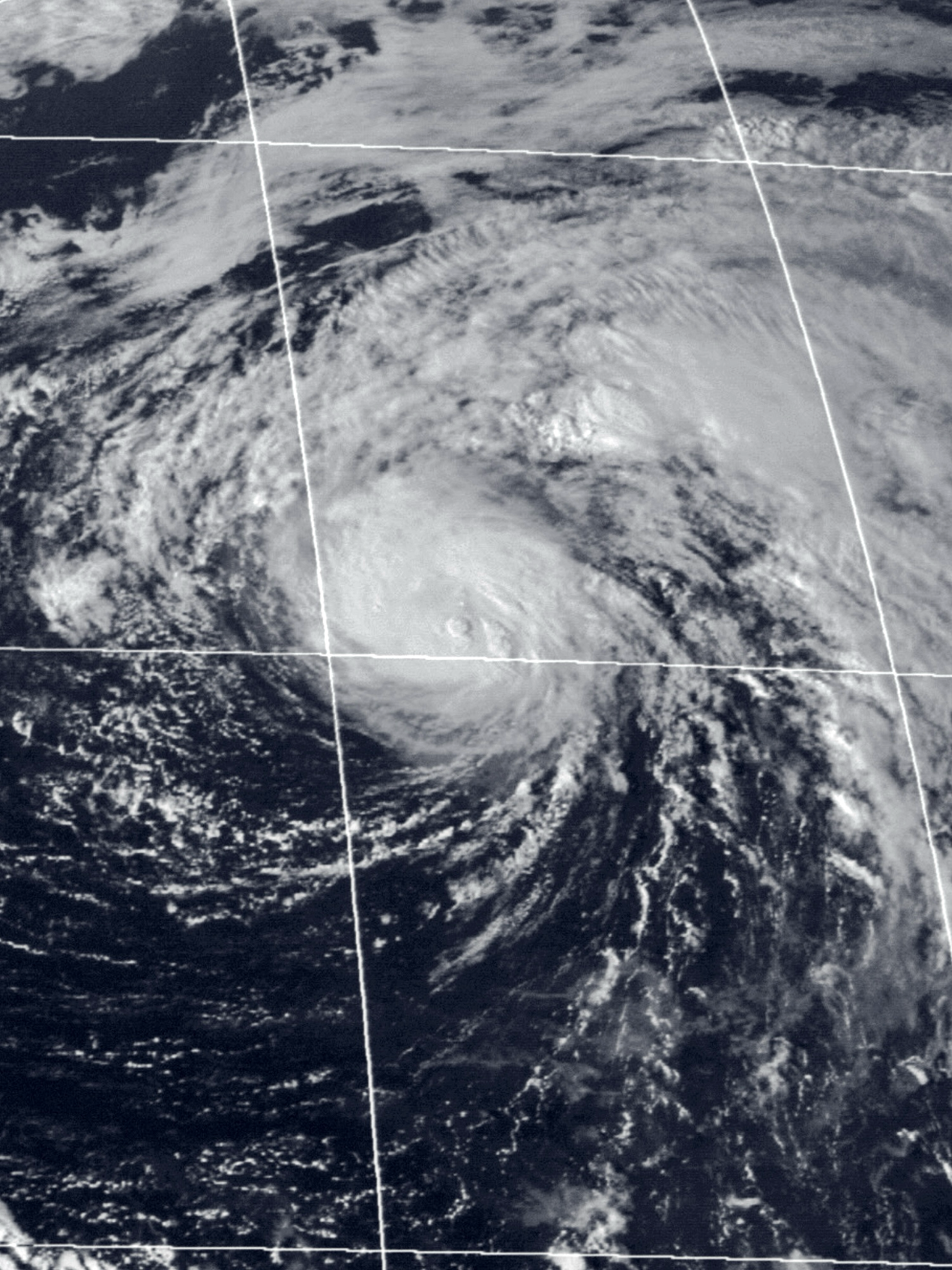
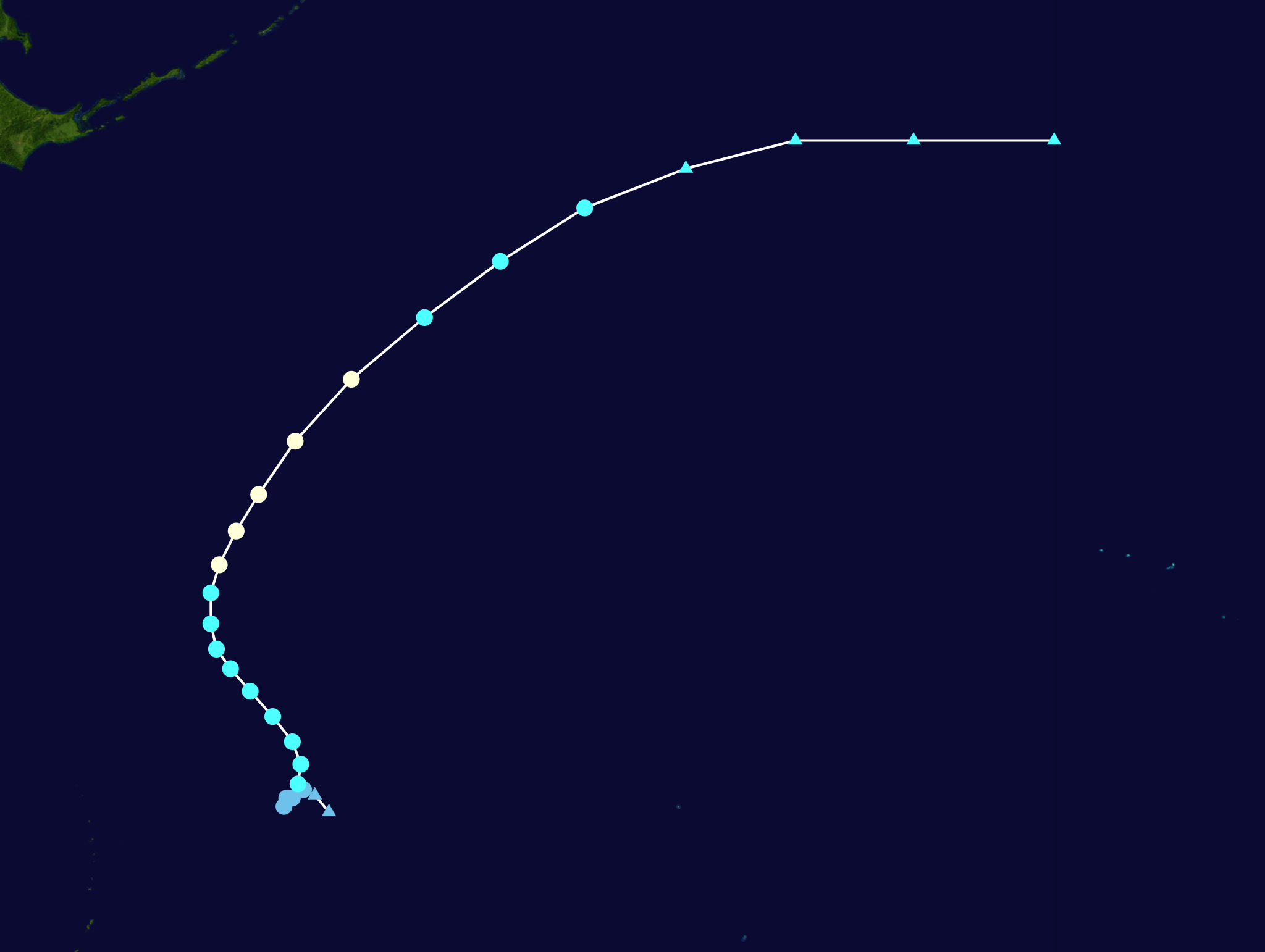
- Duration: September 29 – October 4
- Peak intensity: 130 km/h (80 mph) (10-min); 960 hPa (mbar)

Mamie recurved out to sea.

=== Severe Tropical Storm Nina (Yaning) ===
- Severe tropical storm (JMA)
- Tropical storm (SSHWS)
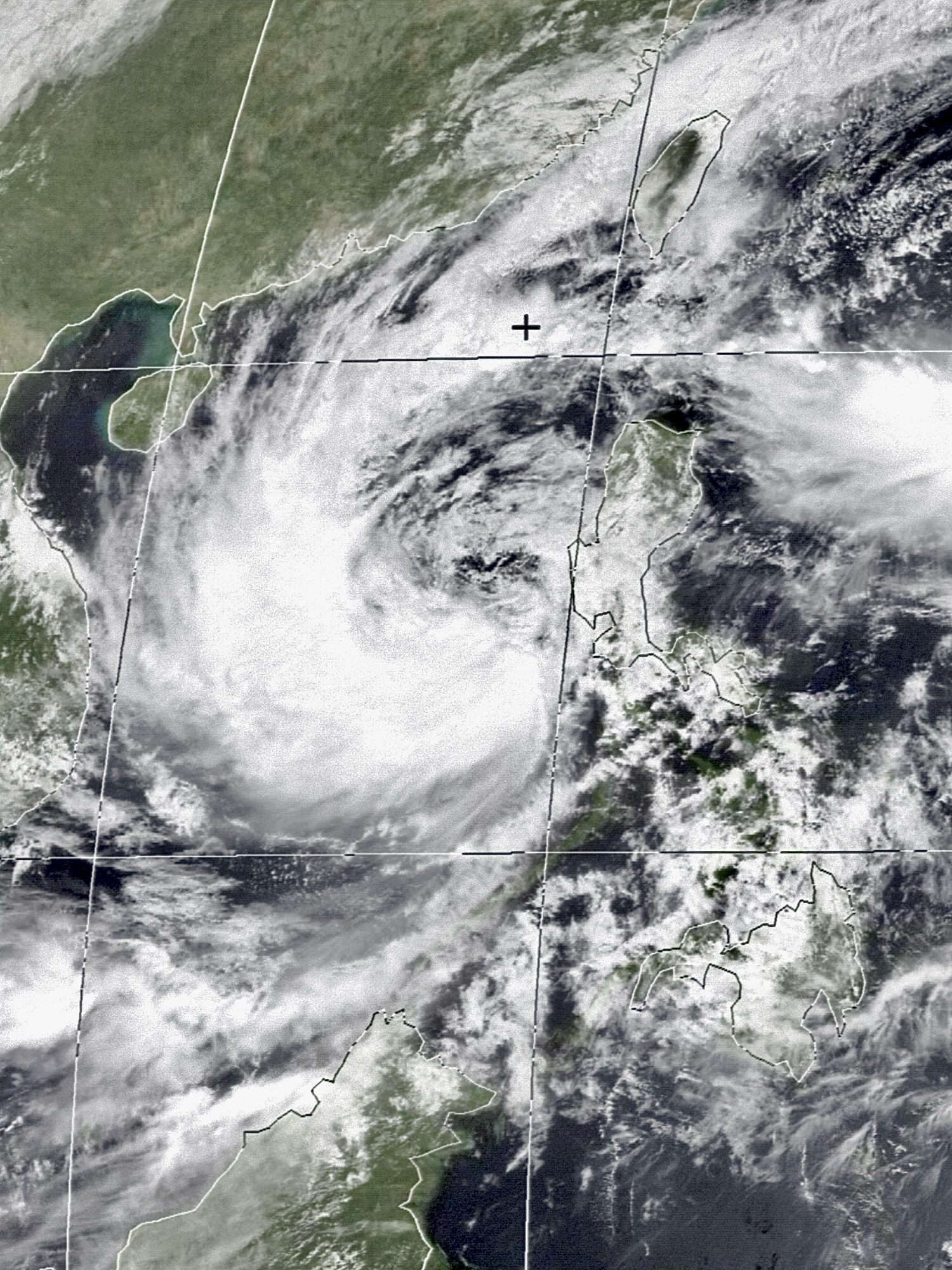
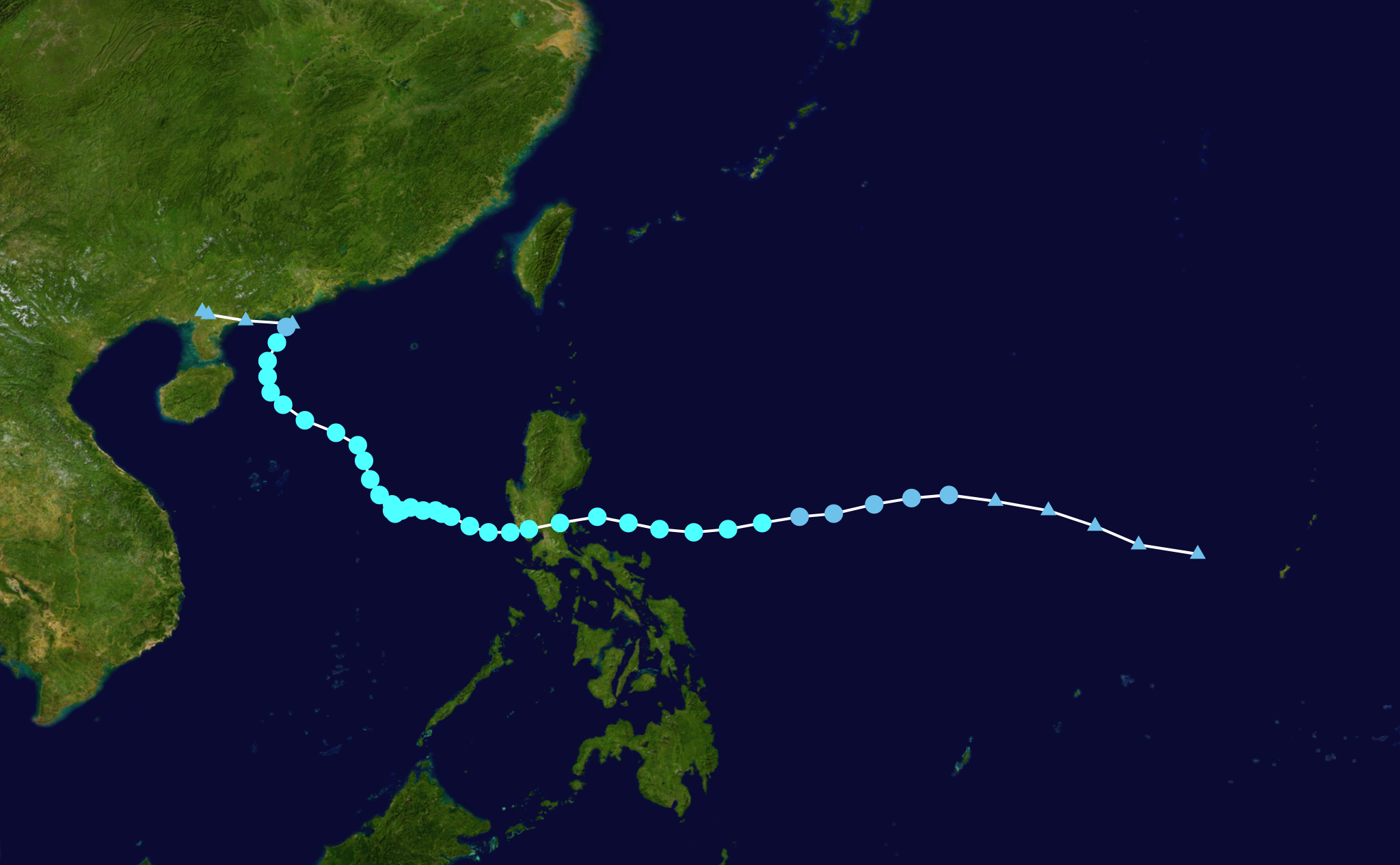
- Duration: October 6 – October 16
- Peak intensity: 110 km/h (70 mph) (10-min); 975 hPa (mbar)

According to the official reports, 59 people died and more than 500,000 were in evacuation centers in the Philippines.

=== Typhoon Ora (Aning) ===
- Typhoon (JMA)
- Category 2 typhoon (SSHWS)
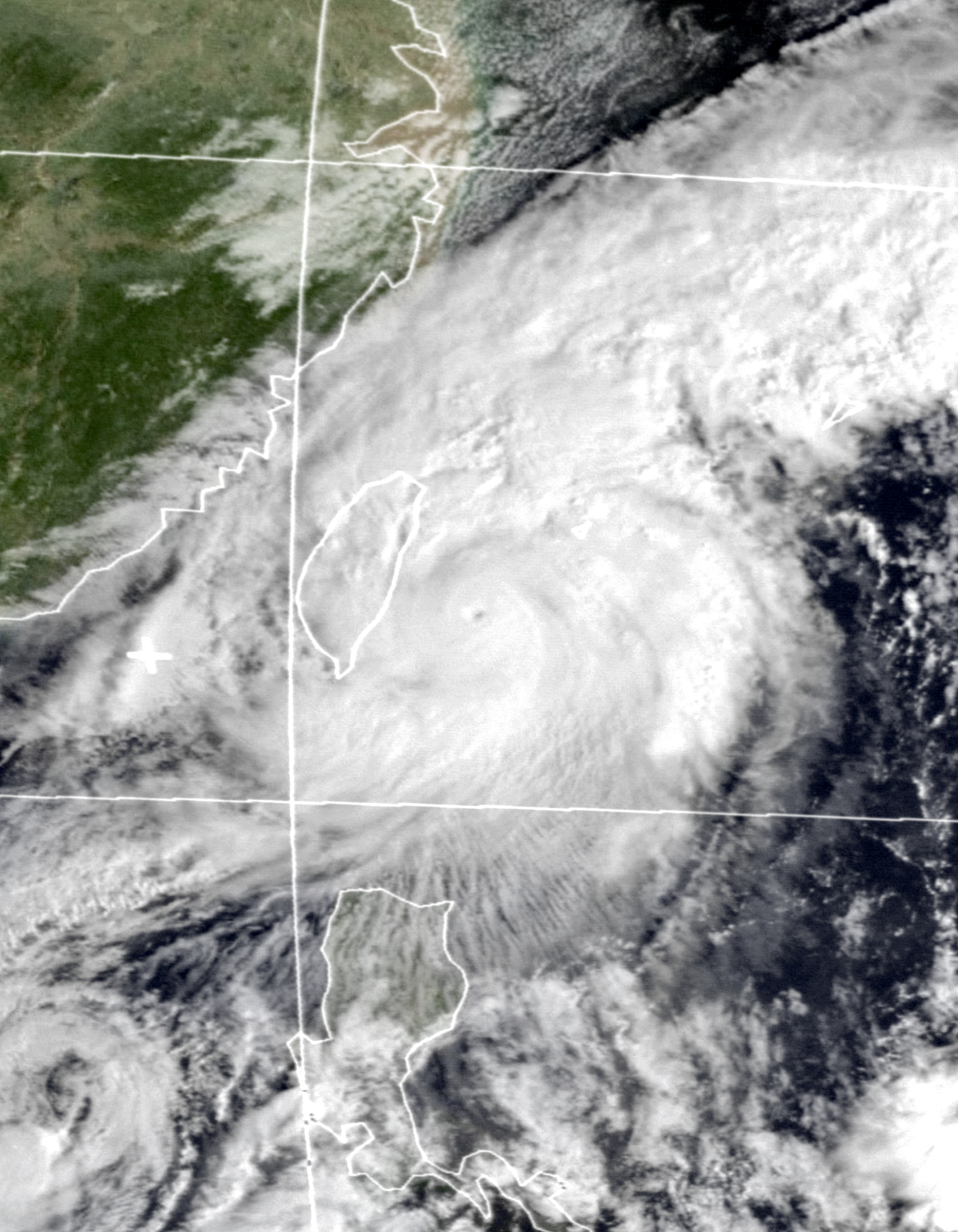
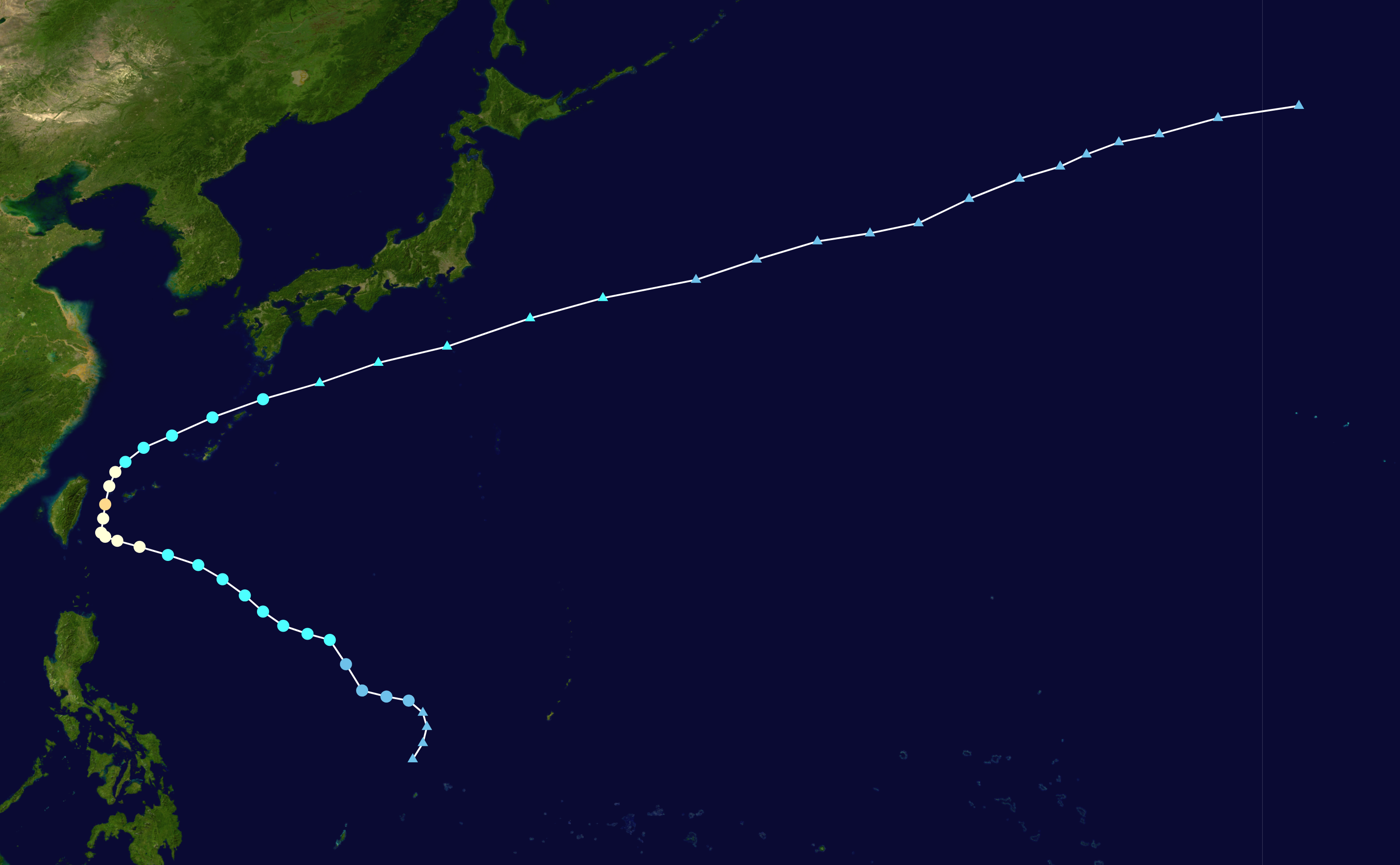
- Duration: October 8 – October 15
- Peak intensity: 150 km/h (90 mph) (10-min); 940 hPa (mbar)

Ora brushed Taiwan.

=== Tropical Depression 25W ===
- Tropical depression (PAGASA)
- Tropical depression (SSHWS)
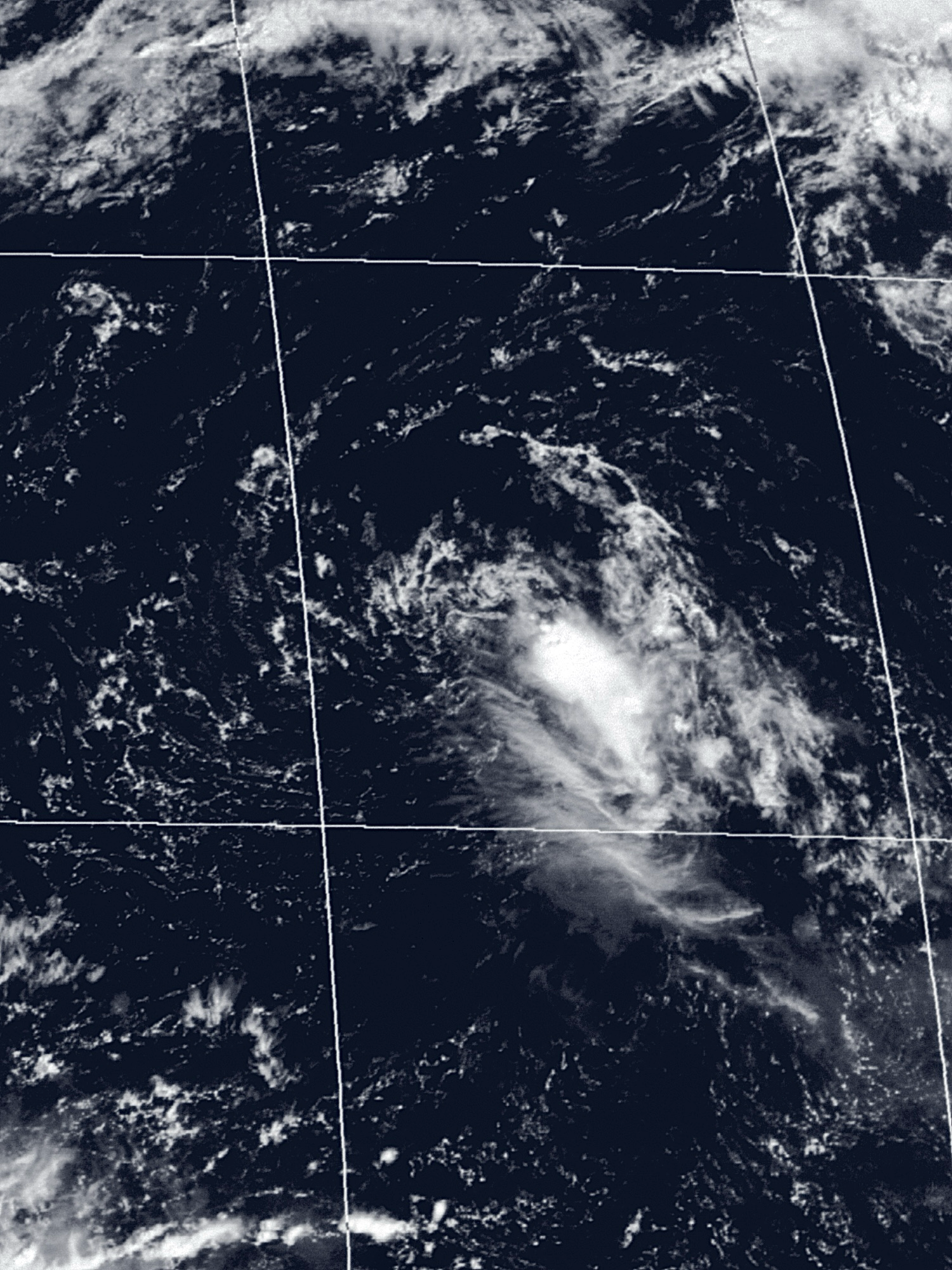
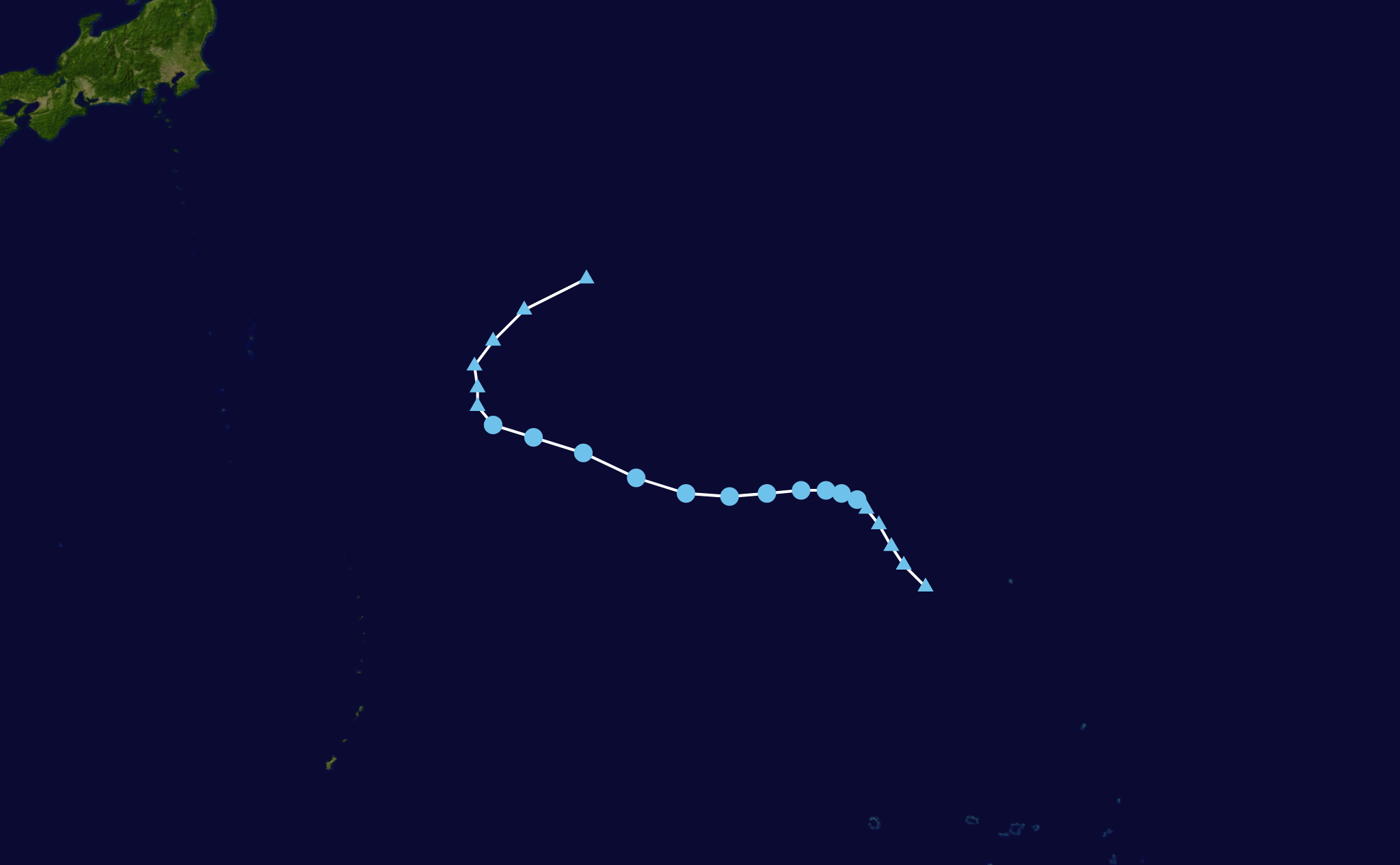
- Duration: October 8 – October 12
- Peak intensity: 55 km/h (35 mph) (10-min); 999 hPa (mbar)

25W did not affect land.

=== Tropical Depression 26W (Bidang) ===
- Tropical depression (PAGASA)
- Tropical depression (SSHWS)
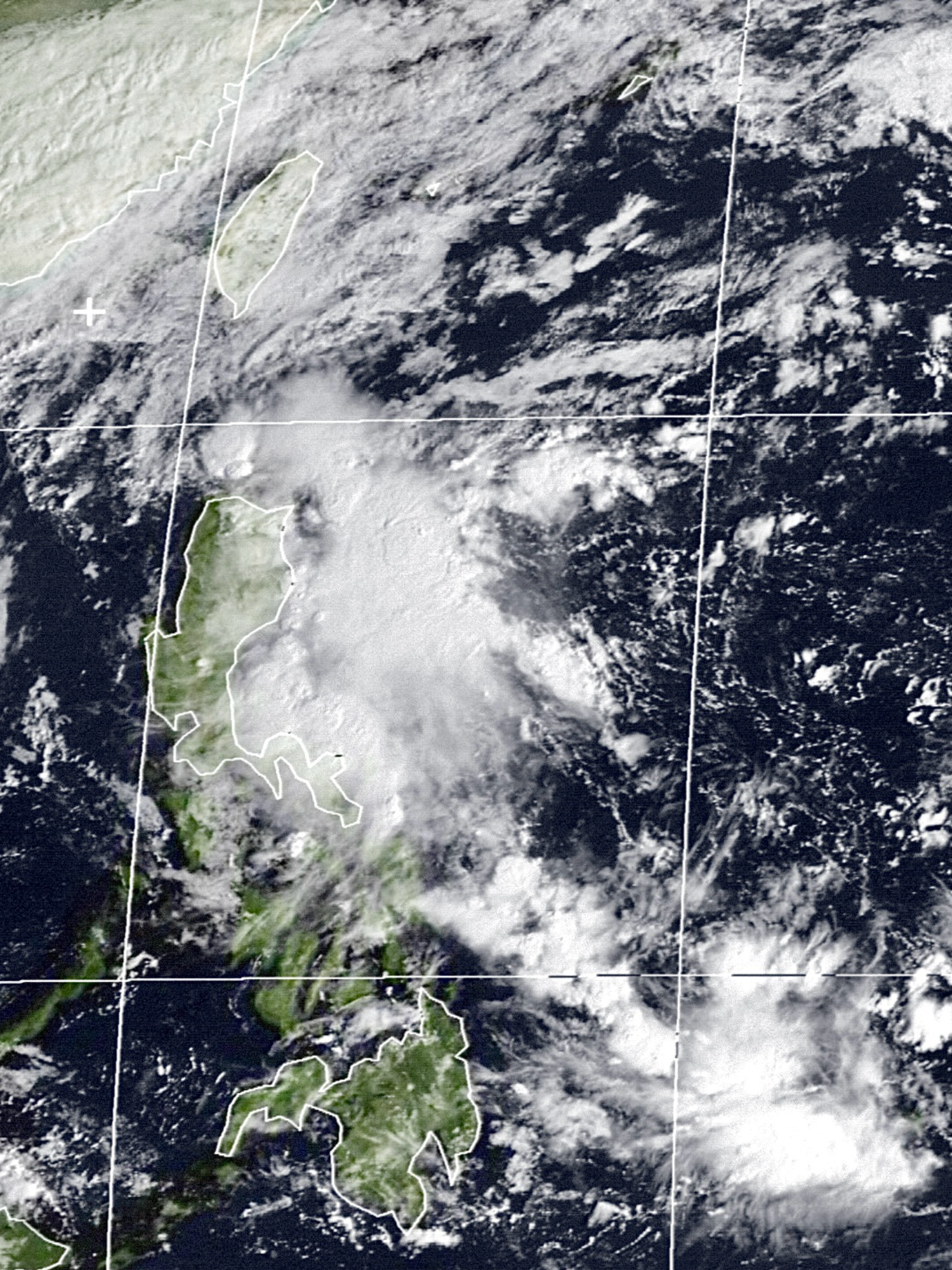
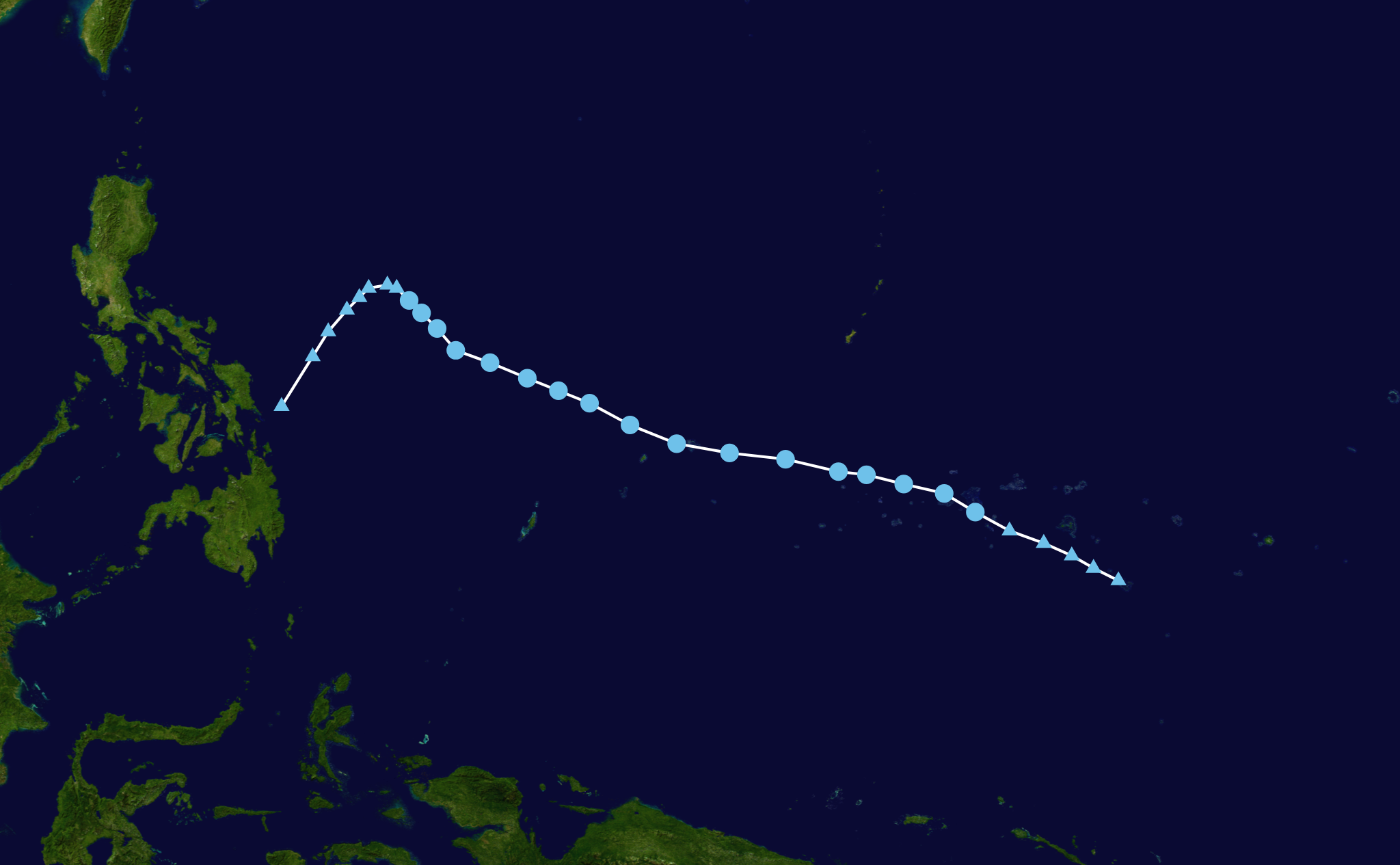
- Duration: October 10 – October 17
- Peak intensity: 55 km/h (35 mph) (10-min); 1002 hPa (mbar)

On October 10, a tropical depression formed nearby Yap Island, gaining the designation number 26 by the JTWC, the depression slowly meandered to the northwest through the following days. 26W was given the name “Bidang” by PAGASA as it crossed into their area of responsibility. Following a northward jog, the depression dissipated on October 17.

=== Typhoon Phyllis ===
- Typhoon (JMA)
- Category 2 typhoon (SSHWS)
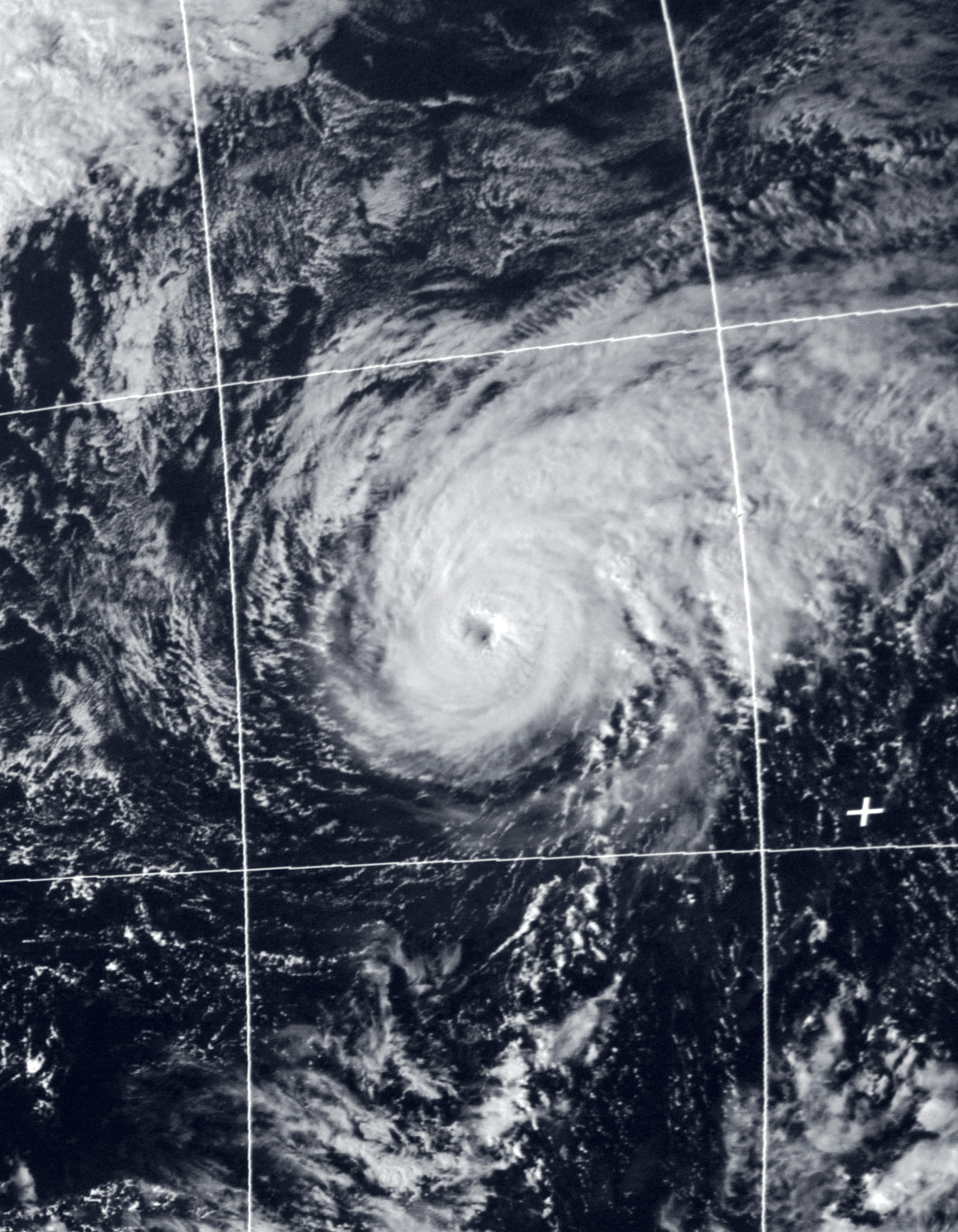
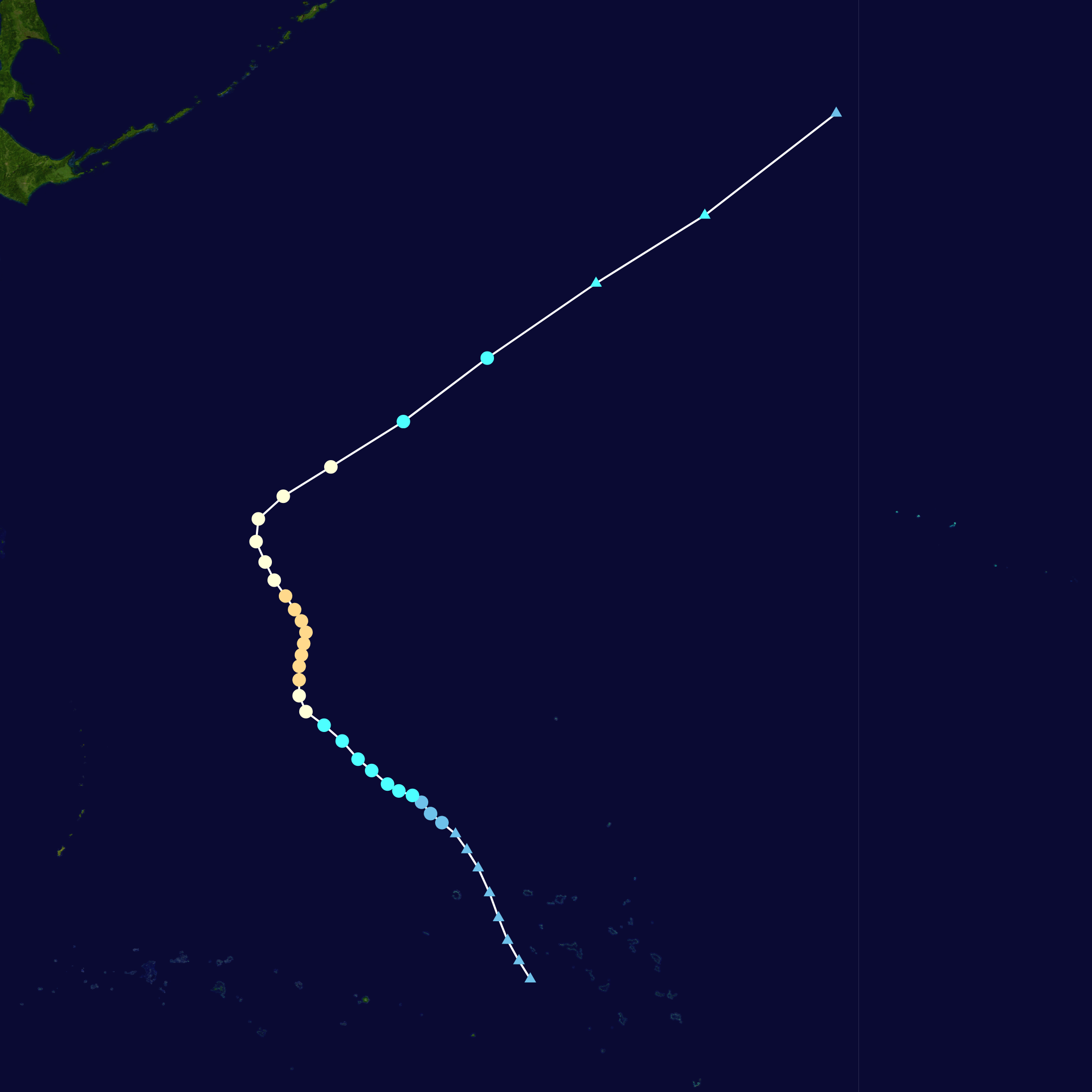
- Duration: October 13 – October 22
- Peak intensity: 150 km/h (90 mph) (10-min); 955 hPa (mbar)

On October 13, a tropical depression formed from a near-equatorial trough over the southern Mariana Islands where it was eventually numbered Tropical Depression 27 by the JTWC. The depression was upgraded to Tropical Storm Phyllis on October 15 as per observations from a reconnaissance aircraft, indicating that Phyllis was a small, compact storm. As it slowly strengthened, a dominant high pressure area northeast of Wake Island had begun to take shape, causing Phyllis to take a northwest trajectory, simultaneously, a nearby tropical upper tropospheric trough (TUTT) had begun to move north as well allowing an increase in outflow aloft where Phyllis was upgraded to typhoon status on October 17. As the dominant high pressure area began to weaken, Phyllis decelerated where it achieved peak intensity as a high-end Category 2-equivalent typhoon with 1-minute sustained winds of 95 kt (110 mph). Cooler sea surface temperatures and reduced upper-level outflow aloft eventually caused Phyllis to gradually weaken as it began to rapidly reaccelerate northwards from the initial dominant high pressure area restrengthening to the west of Phyllis. Increased vertical wind shear continued to weaken the storm, leading to its downgrade to tropical storm intensity on October 22, a strong pressure gradient from a nearby surface low moving eastward off eastern Japan and the strong surface ridge to the east of Phyllis allowed it to maintain gale-force winds as extratropical transition commenced and later completed the next day.

Because Phyllis remained over open water, no major damage was reported.

=== Typhoon Rita (Kading) ===
- Violent typhoon (JMA)
- Category 5 super typhoon (SSHWS)
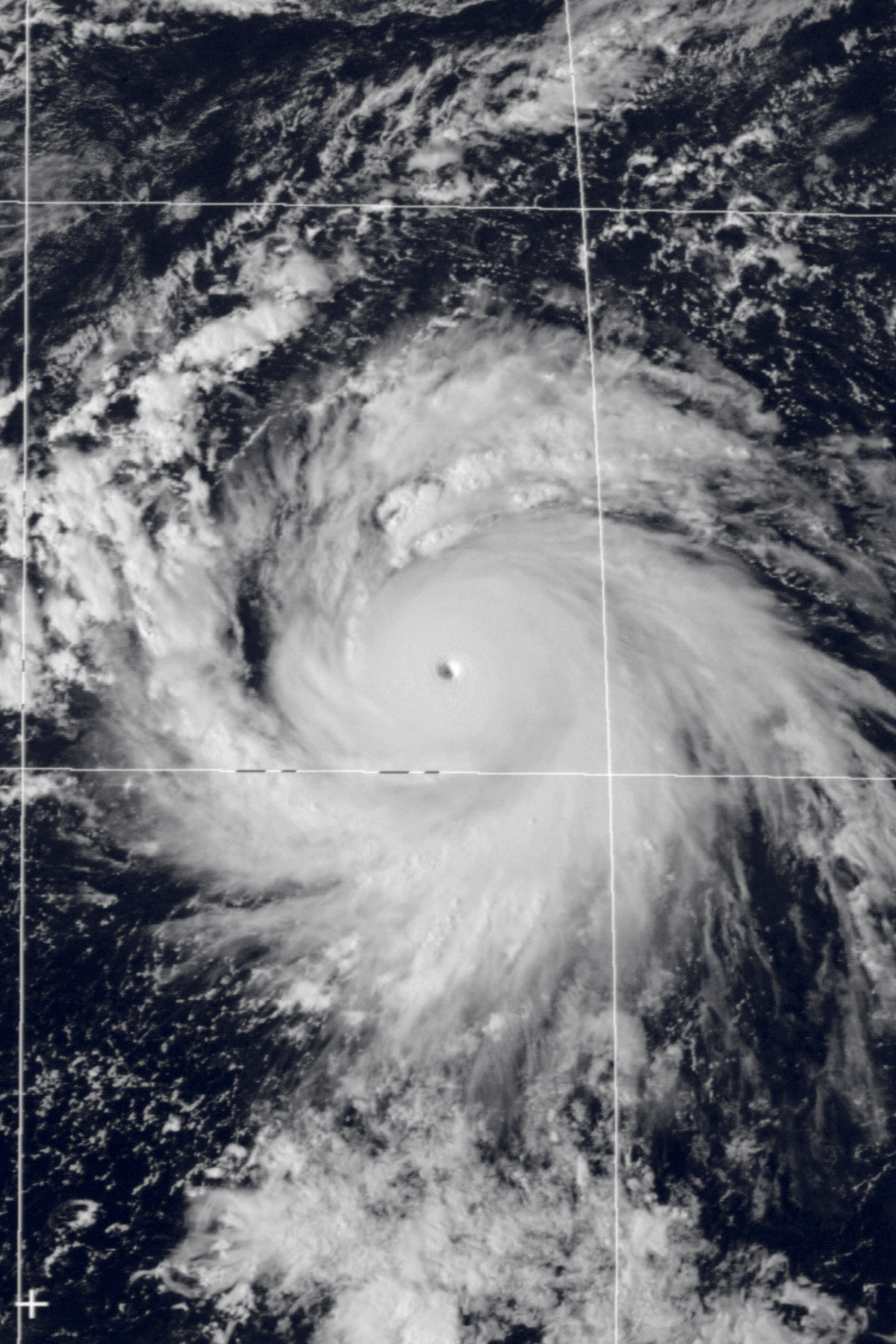
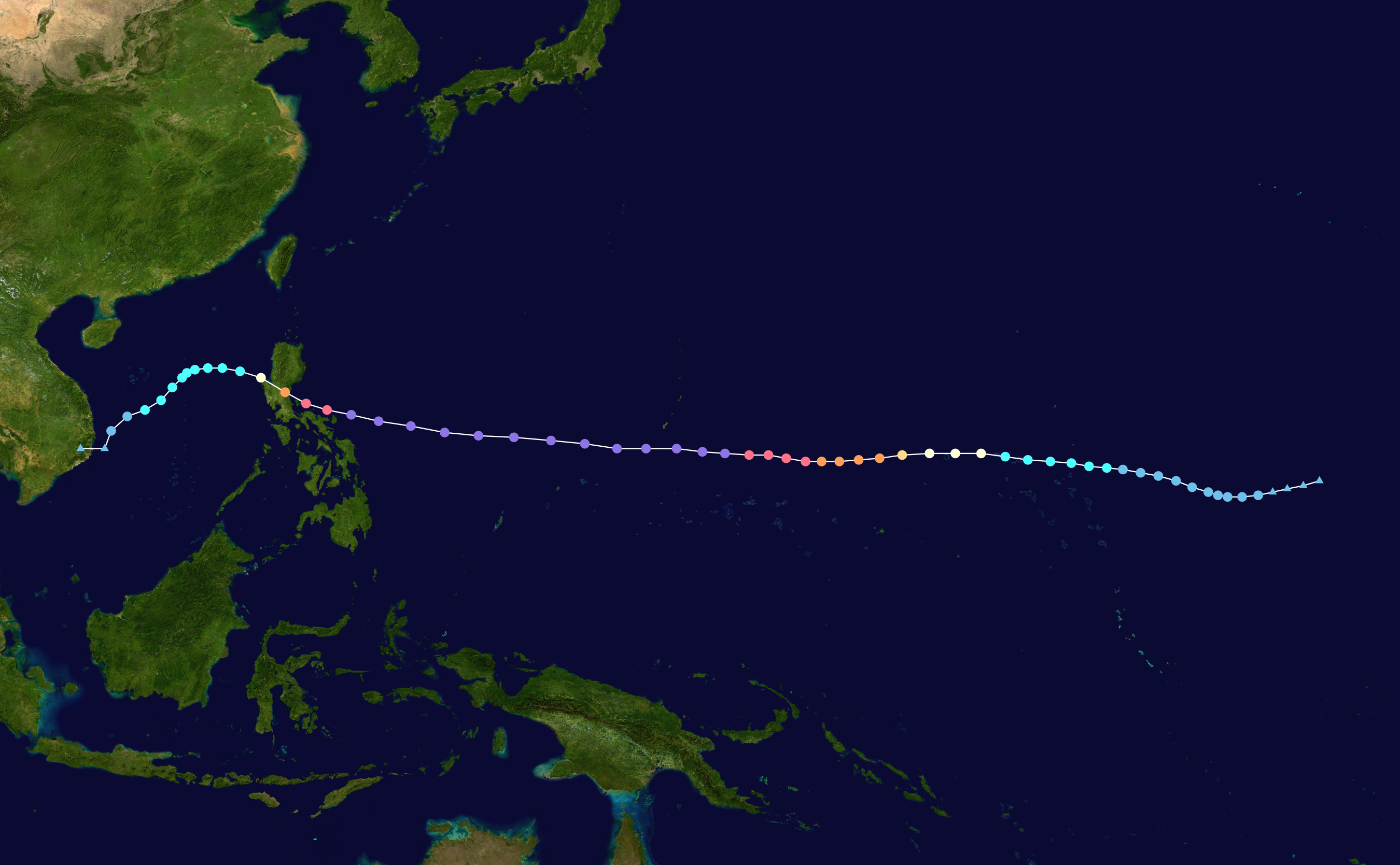
- Duration: October 15 – October 29
- Peak intensity: 220 km/h (140 mph) (10-min); 880 hPa (mbar)

On October 15, a tropical depression formed in the far-eastern portions of the basin, gaining the designation number 28 by the JTWC. Three and a half days later, it strengthened into Tropical Storm Rita, becoming a typhoon late on October 19. Rita reached Category 5 status on October 23, reaching a minimum central pressure of 878 millibars on October 25, only 8 milibars higher than Typhoon Tip's record set in 1979. After spending over three consecutive days at that intensity, Rita weakened to a Category 4 and smashed ashore on Luzon. Rita stayed a typhoon during its entire passage over the Philippines and emerged into the South China Sea as a minimal typhoon. Rita then decayed slowly and dissipated as a depression near the coast of Vietnam. The typhoon caused considerable damage and loss of life in the Philippines, though exact numbers are unknown.

=== Unnamed tropical storm ===
- Tropical storm (JMA)
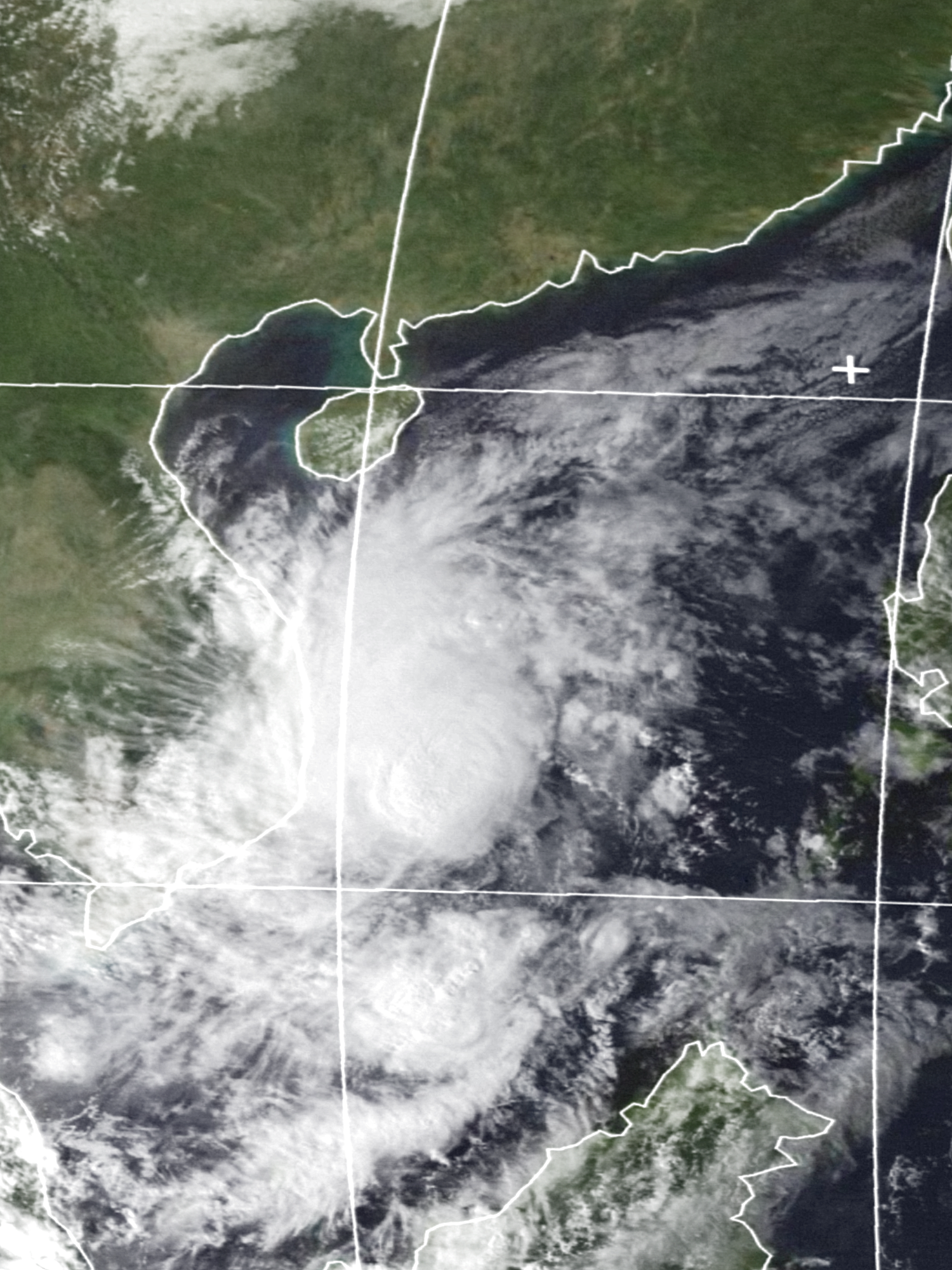
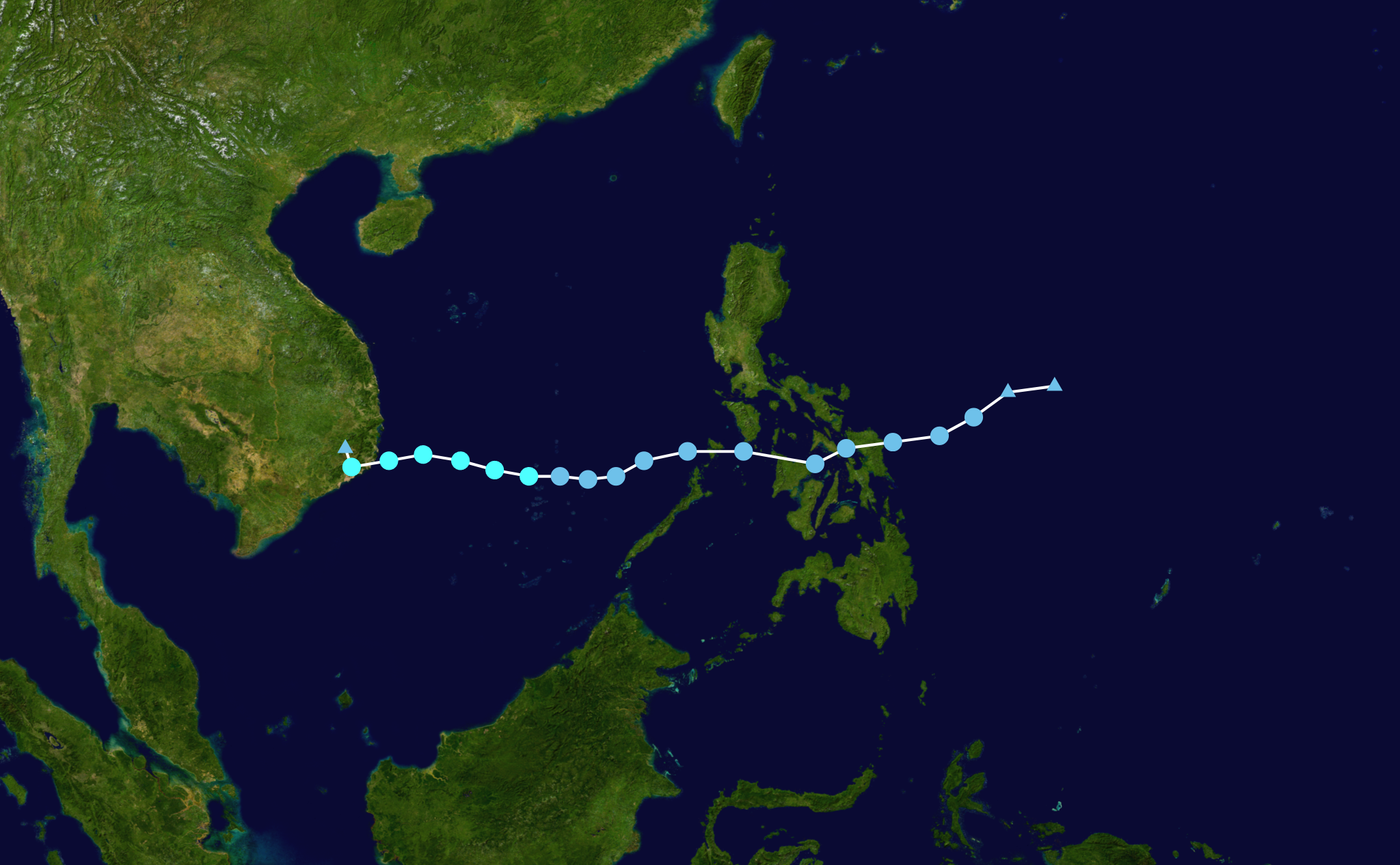
- Duration: October 30 – November 3
- Peak intensity: 85 km/h (50 mph) (10-min); 992 hPa (mbar)

A tropical depression formed on October 29 to the northeast of the Philippines. After tracking across the country, it strengthened and was classified as a tropical storm by the JMA on November 2. The storm made landfall in southern Vietnam the following day, quickly dissipating overland. It was not recognized as a tropical cyclone by the JTWC.

=== Severe Tropical Storm Tess ===
- Severe tropical storm (JMA)
- Tropical storm (SSHWS)
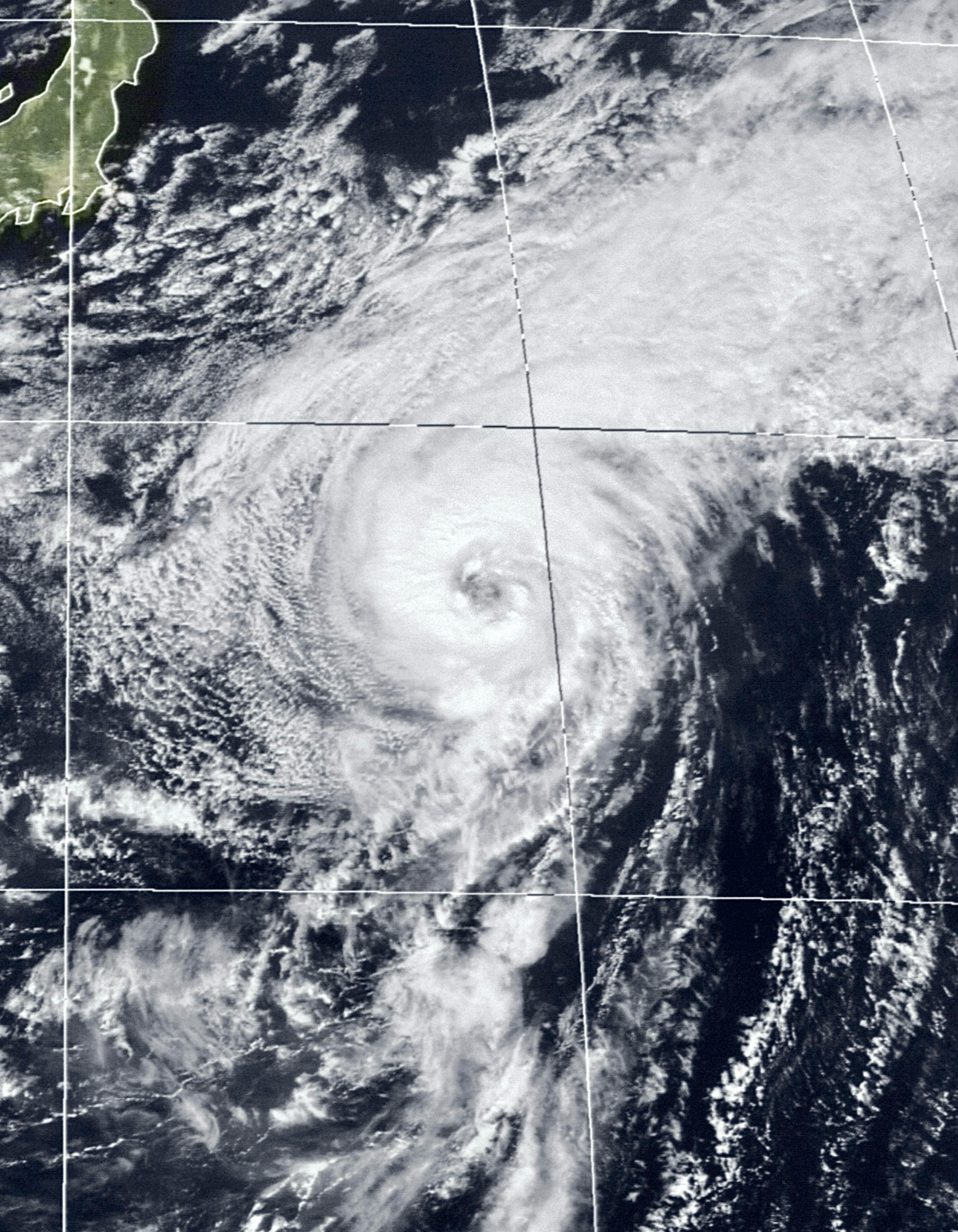
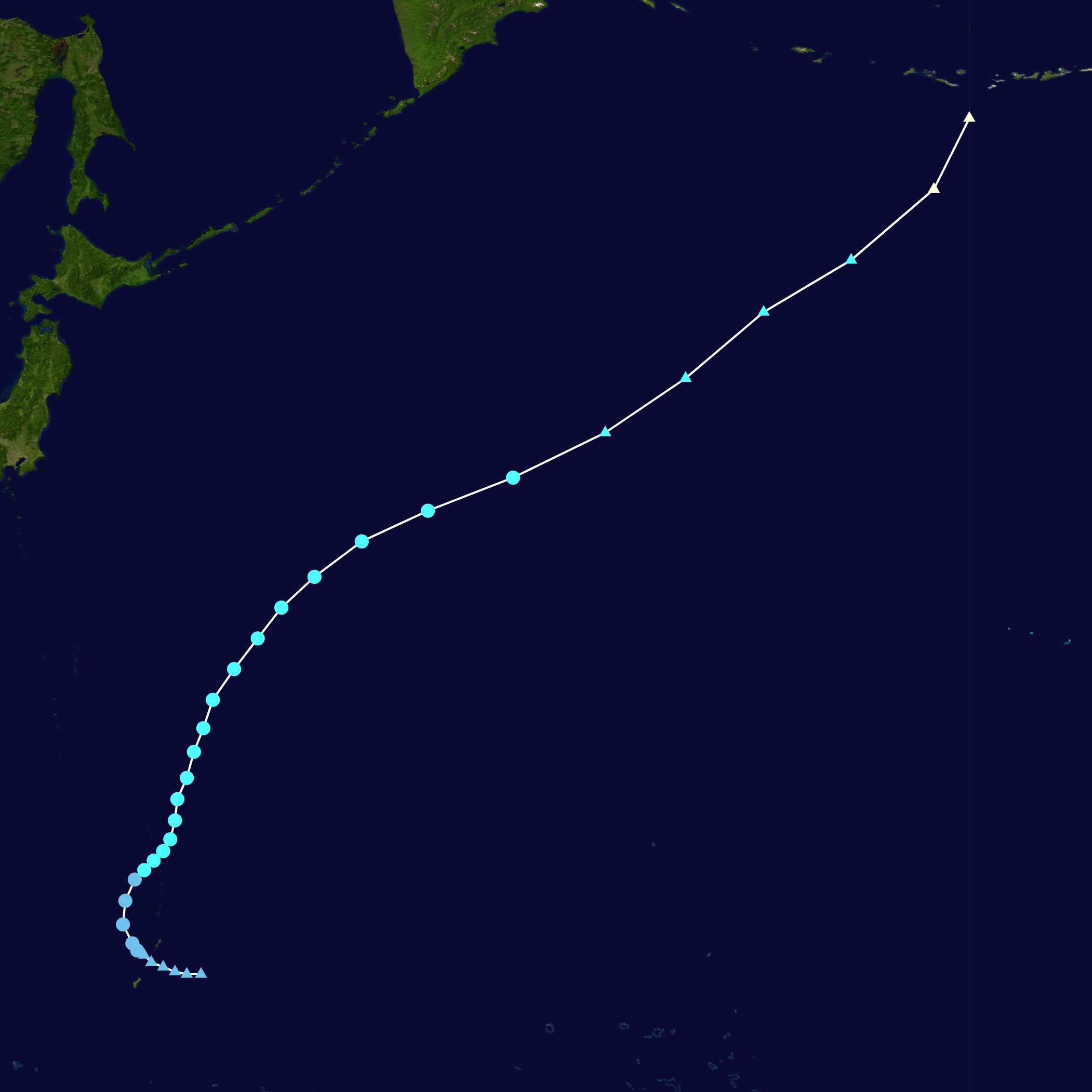
- Duration: October 31 – November 6
- Peak intensity: 110 km/h (70 mph) (10-min); 975 hPa (mbar)

A tropical depression developed on October 31. The depression was upgraded to a tropical storm on November 2. Tess continued to intensify and reached its peak intensity as a 70 mph (110 km/h) storm; just short of typhoon status. The storm became extratropical on November 7.

=== Tropical Depression 30W (Delang) ===
- Tropical depression (PAGASA)
- Tropical depression (SSHWS)
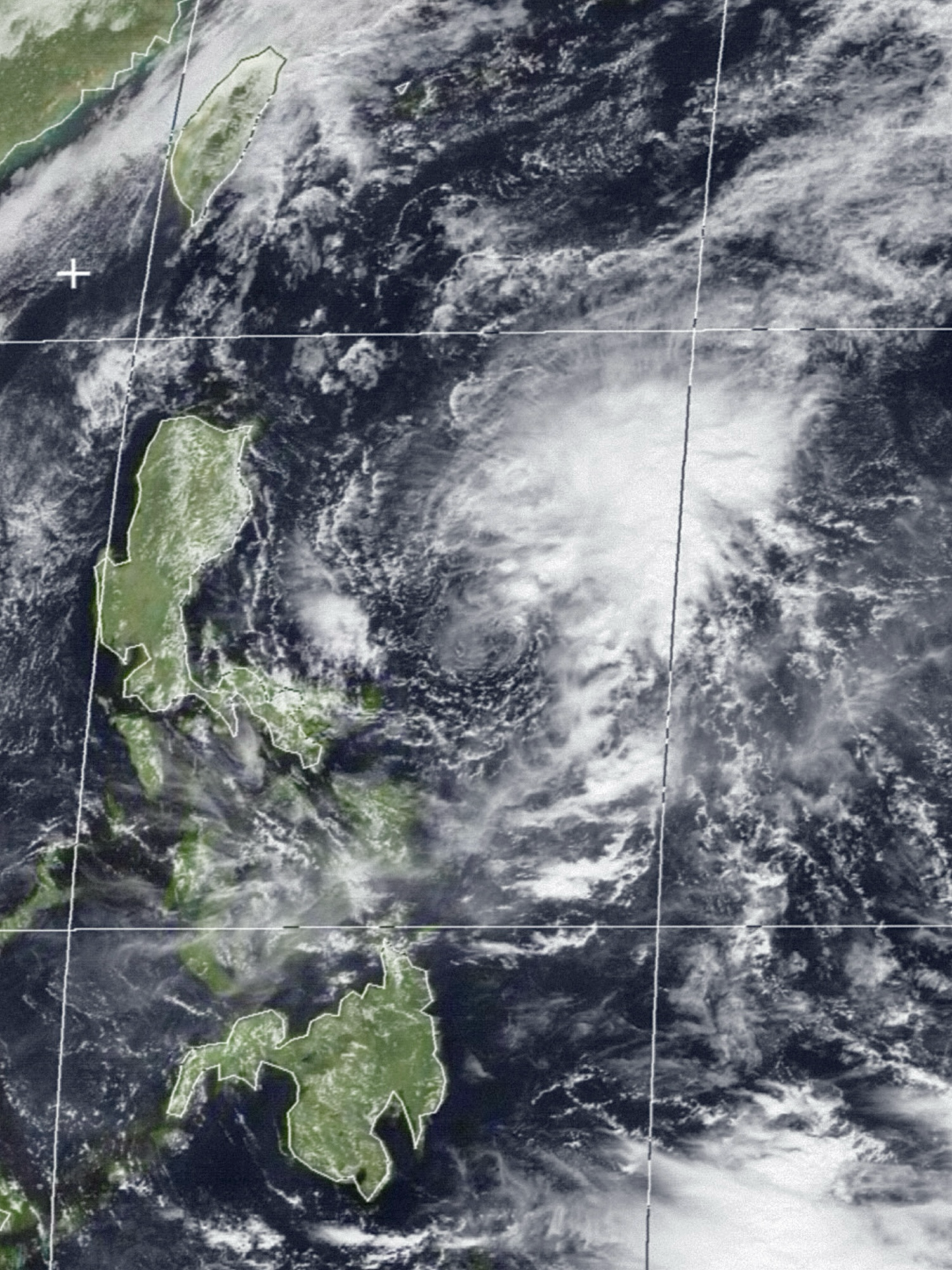
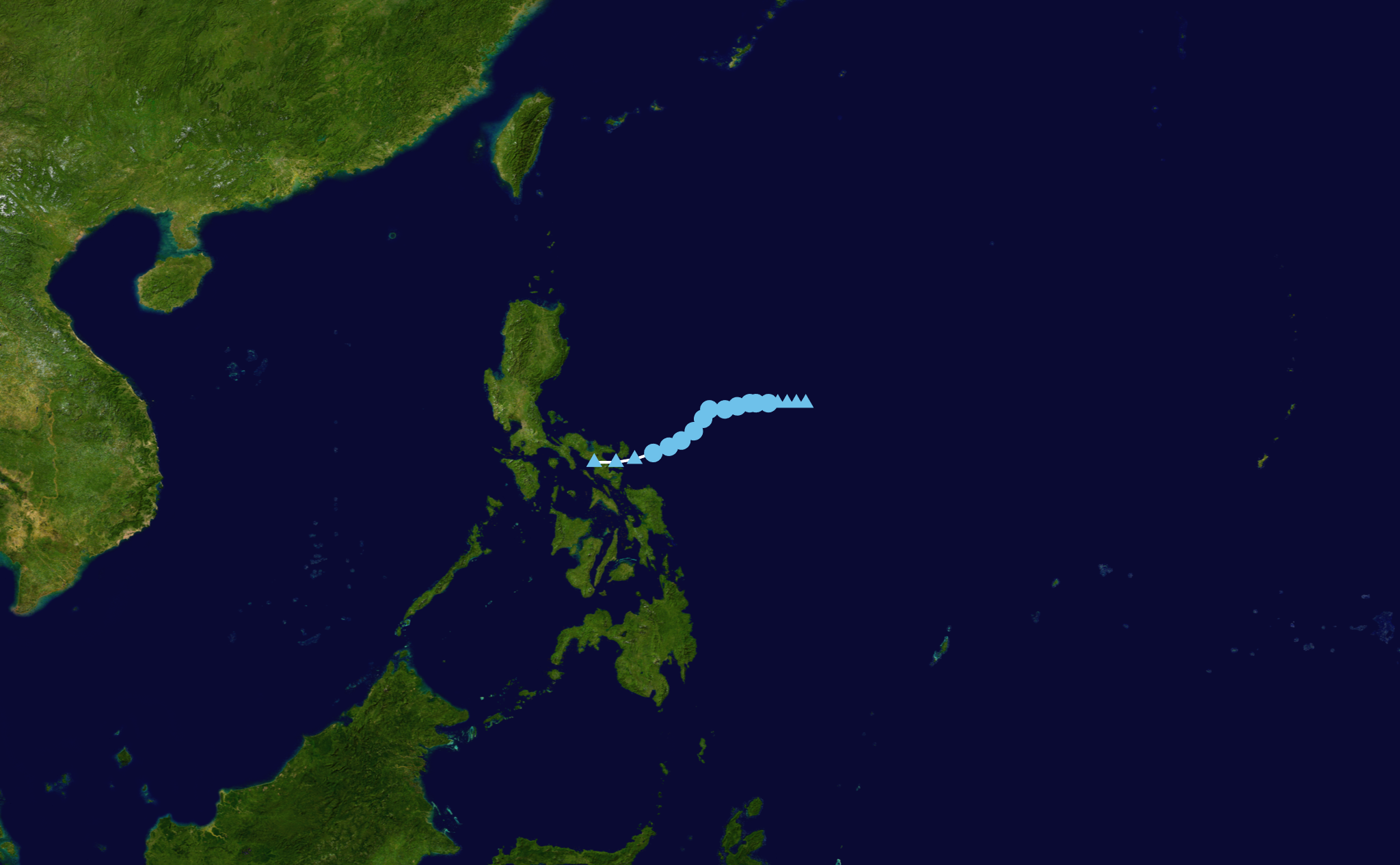
- Duration: November 15 – November 20
- Peak intensity: 55 km/h (35 mph) (10-min); 1002 hPa (mbar)

30W came close to land.

=== Typhoon Viola (Esang) ===
- Violent typhoon (JMA)
- Category 4 typhoon (SSHWS)
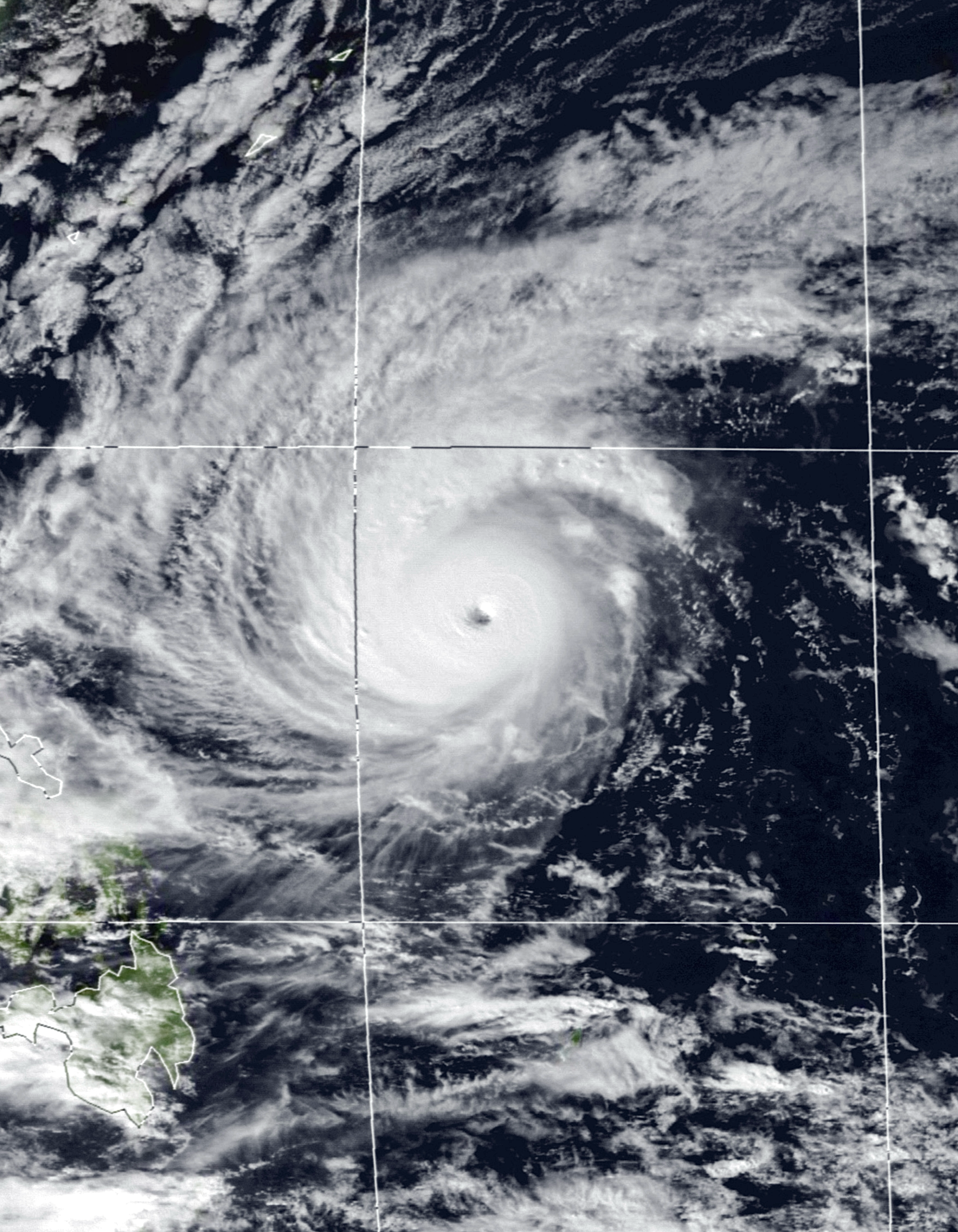
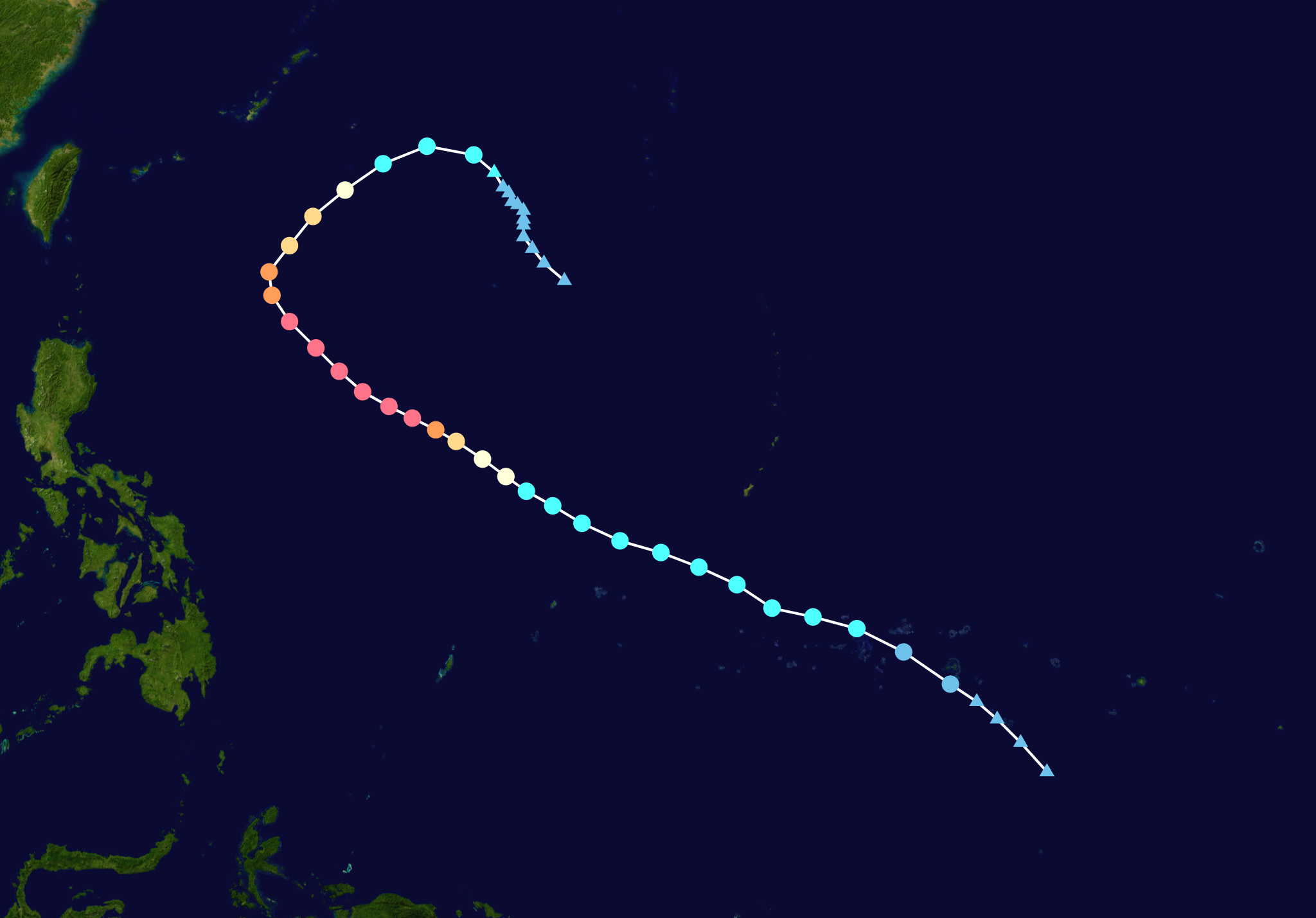
- Duration: November 16 – November 24
- Peak intensity: 195 km/h (120 mph) (10-min); 910 hPa (mbar)

Increased convective activity in the monsoon trough was first noticed on satellite data on November 14 about 690 mi (1,110 km) southeast of Truk. On November 16, the disturbance was upgraded to Tropical Depression 33. Based on an improved satellite signature, TD 33 was upgraded to Tropical Storm Viola at 1200 UTC November 17. Viola continued to intensify as the storm moved on a northwestward track. Late on November 19 reconnaissance aircraft confirmed that Viola's surface pressure had fallen to 977 mb; and, that an eye was beginning to form. Early on November 20, Viola was upgraded to a typhoon. Viola then started to rapidly intensify and reached peak intensity on November 21 with winds of 145 mph (233 km/h). Viola recurved away from Luzon on November 22. By the next day, the storm had already weakened to a category 1 and further weakened to a tropical storm. Viola dissipated on November 24.

=== Severe Tropical Storm Winnie ===
- Severe tropical storm (JMA)
- Tropical storm (SSHWS)
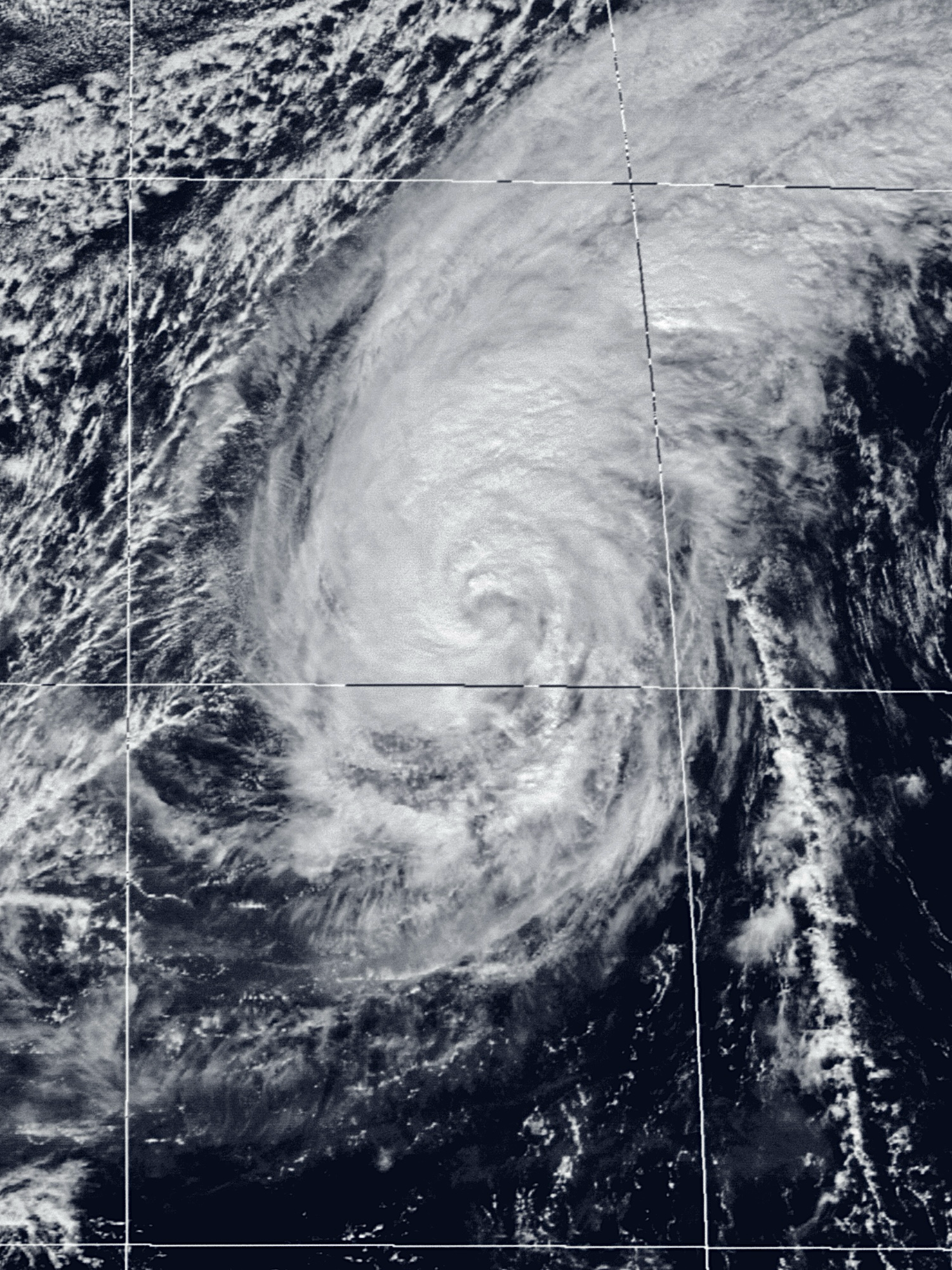
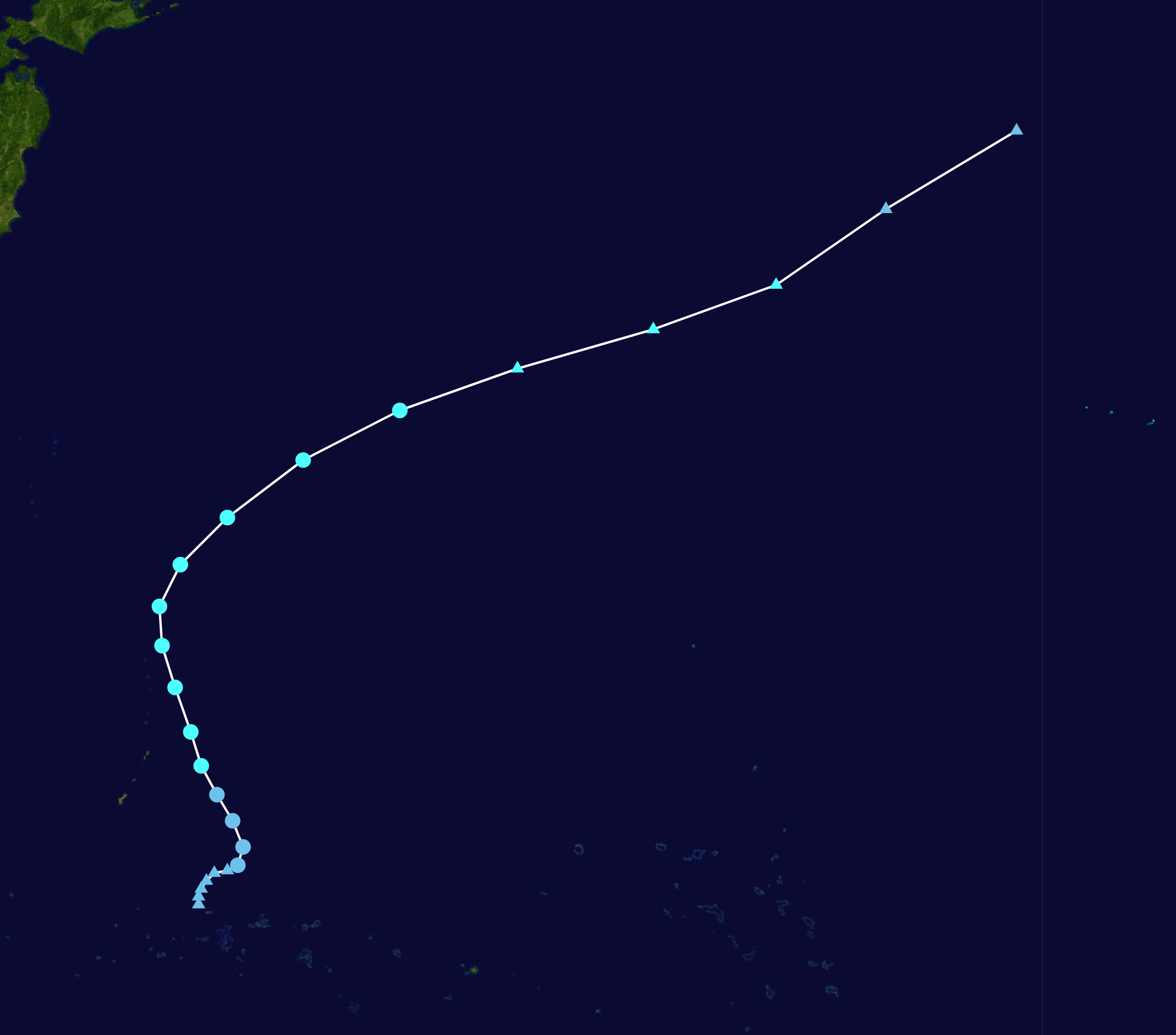
- Duration: November 25 – November 30
- Peak intensity: 100 km/h (65 mph) (10-min); 980 hPa (mbar)

A tropical depression developed on November 25. It started to intensify while moving on a north-northwestward track. By November 28, it was upgraded to a tropical storm and was named Winnie. On the 29th, Winnie reached its peak intensity as severe tropical storm with (10-min) winds of 65 mph (105 km/h). Winnie became extratropical early on November 30.

=== Tropical Depression Garding ===
- Tropical depression (JMA)
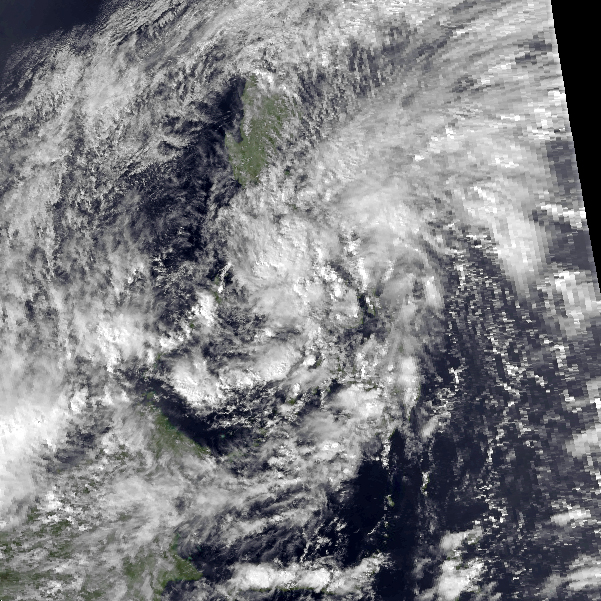
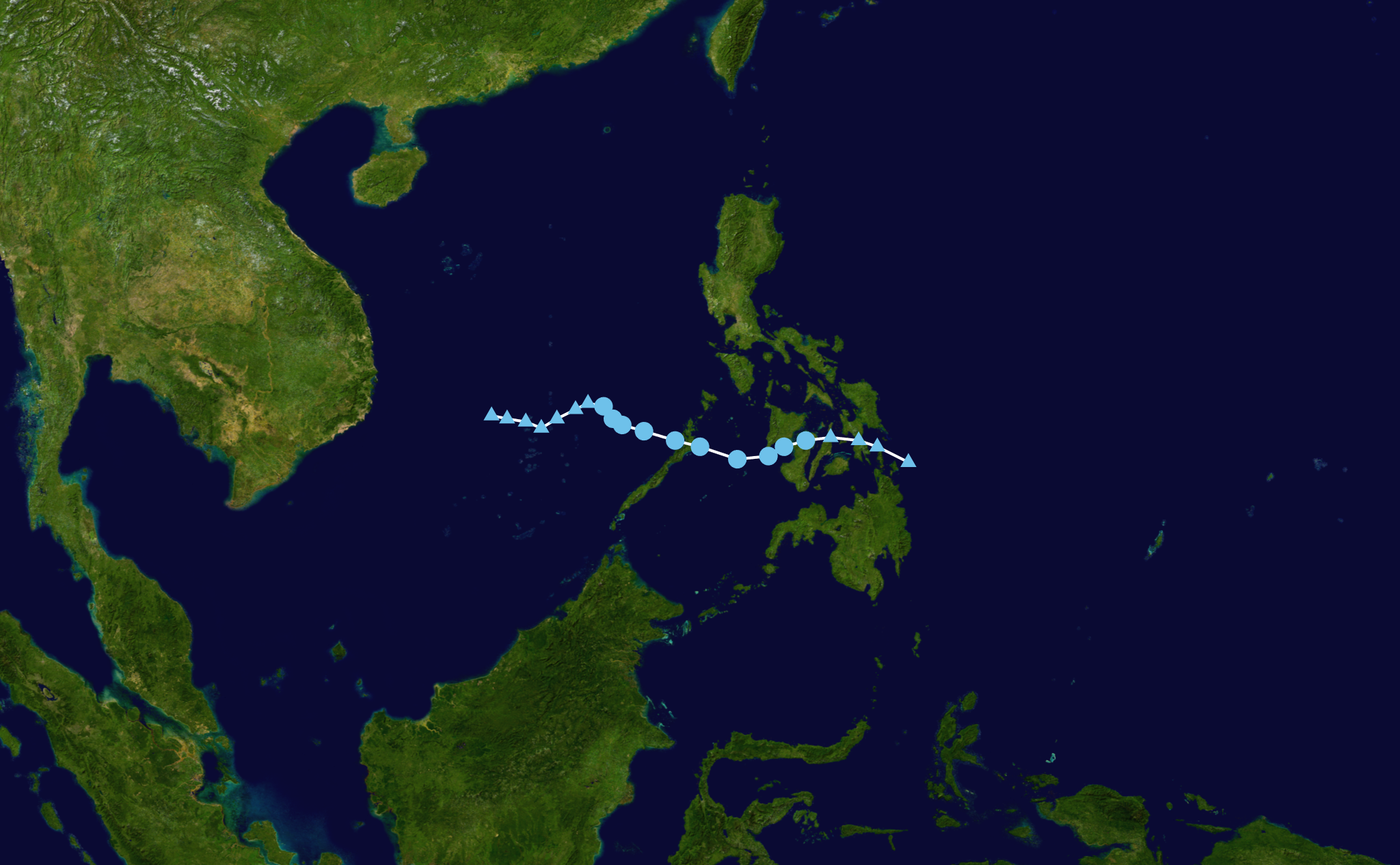
- Duration: December 13 – December 19
- Peak intensity: 55 km/h (35 mph) (10-min); 1004 hPa (mbar)

The last system of the season, Tropical Depression Garding was named by PAGASA.

== Storm names ==
During the season 28 named tropical cyclones developed in the Western Pacific and were named by the Joint Typhoon Warning Center, when it was determined that they had become tropical storms. These names were contributed to a revised list from late 1950. However the JTWC changed their naming scheme by the next year, now including both female and male names.

Nadine	Olive	Polly	Rose	Shirley	Trix	Virginia	Wendy	Agnes	Bonnie	Carmen	Della	Elaine	Faye
Gloria	Hester	Irma	Judy	Kit	Lola	Mamie	Nina	Ora	Phyllis	Rita	Tess	Viola	Winnie

One name, Susan, developed over the Central Pacific and was named from this list. The storm never became a part of the West Pacific basin.

=== Philippines ===
Atang	Bising	Klaring	Deling	Emang
Gading	Heling	Iliang	Loleng	Miding
Norming	Oyang	Pasing	Ruping	Susang
Tering	Uding	Weling	Yaning	
Auxiliary list
Aning	Bidang	Kading	Delang	Esang
Garding				

The Philippine Atmospheric, Geophysical and Astronomical Services Administration uses its own naming scheme for tropical cyclones in their area of responsibility. PAGASA assigns names to tropical depressions that form within their area of responsibility and any tropical cyclone that might move into their area of responsibility. Should the list of names for a given year prove to be insufficient, names are taken from an auxiliary list, the first 6 of which are published each year before the season starts. Names not retired from this list will be used again in the 1982 season. This is the same list used for the 1974 season. PAGASA uses its own naming scheme that starts in the Filipino alphabet, with names of Filipino female names ending with "ng" (A, B, K, D, etc.). Names that were not assigned/going to use are marked in gray.

=== Retirement ===
Due to extreme damages and death toll caused by Typhoons Olive (Atang) and Rita (Kading), PAGASA retired the names Atang from its main list and Kading from its auxiliary list. They were replaced by Akang and Katring from the 1982 season.

== Season effects ==
This table will list all the storms that developed in the northwestern Pacific Ocean west of the International Date Line and north of the equator during 1978. It will include their intensity, duration, name, areas affected, deaths, missing persons (in parentheses), and damage totals. Classification and intensity values will be based on estimations conducted by the JMA. All damage figures will be in 1978 USD. Damages and deaths from a storm will include when the storm was a precursor wave or an extratropical low.

Name	Dates	Peak intensity			Areas affected	Damage (USD)	Deaths	Ref(s).
Name	Dates	Category	Wind speed	Pressure	Areas affected	Damage (USD)	Deaths	Ref(s).
Nadine	January 6 – 13	Severe tropical storm	100 km/h (62 mph)	975 hPa (28.79 inHg)	Marshall Islands	None	None	
Olive (Atang)	April 15 – May 1	Typhoon	150 km/h (93 mph)	950 hPa (28.05 inHg)	Palau, Philippines, Taiwan	Unknown	3	
TD	June 7	Tropical depression	Not specified	1004 hPa (29.65 inHg)	Philippines	None	None	
TD	June 10	Tropical depression	Not specified	1008 hPa (29.77 inHg)	Philippines	None	None	
TD	June 12 – 13	Tropical depression	Not specified	1004 hPa (29.65 inHg)	Philippines	None	None	
Polly (Bising)	June 14 – 20	Tropical storm	85 km/h (53 mph)	985 hPa (29.09 inHg)	Ryukyu Islands, Japan	None	None	
Rose (Klaring)	June 21 – 25	Tropical storm	85 km/h (53 mph)	990 hPa (29.23 inHg)	Philippines, Taiwan	None	None	
Shirley (Deling)	June 28 – July 2	Tropical storm	85 km/h (53 mph)	992 hPa (29.29 inHg)	Philippines, Vietnam, Cambodia	Unknown	None	
TD	July 7 – 11	Tropical depression	Not specified	1004 hPa (29.65 inHg)	Japan	None	None	
Trix	July 11 – 24	Typhoon	130 km/h (81 mph)	965 hPa (28.50 inHg)	Ryukyu Islands, China	Unknown	Unknown	
TD	July 16	Tropical depression	Not specified	1000 hPa (29.53 inHg)	None	None	None	
Wendy (Emang)	July 22 – August 3	Typhoon	130 km/h (81 mph)	960 hPa (28.35 inHg)	Ryukyu Islands, Japan	None	None	
Virginia	July 22 – August 3	Typhoon	150 km/h (93 mph)	975 hPa (28.79 inHg)	Japan	None	None	
Agnes	July 22 – 31	Severe tropical storm	100 km/h (62 mph)	980 hPa (29.09 inHg)	South China	None	3	
TD	July 31	Tropical depression	Not specified	1004 hPa (29.65 inHg)	None	None	None	
TD	August 4 – 5	Tropical depression	Not specified	1002 hPa (29.65 inHg)	Taiwan	None	None	
Gading	August 4 – 8	Tropical depression	55 km/h (34 mph)	1000 hPa (29.53 inHg)	Taiwan	None	None	
Bonnie	August 9 – 13	Tropical storm	75 km/h (47 mph)	985 hPa (29.09 inHg)	South China, Vietnam	None	None	
Carmen (Iliang)	August 9 – 20	Typhoon	165 km/h (103 mph)	965 hPa (28.50 inHg)	Ryukyu Islands, East China, Korea	$3 million	21	
Della (Heling)	August 9 – 13	Tropical storm	85 km/h (53 mph)	985 hPa (29.09 inHg)	Philippines, Taiwan, China	None	None	
Loleng	August 13 – 17	Tropical depression	55 km/h (34 mph)	1000 hPa (29.53 inHg)	Philippines, South China	None	None	
TD	August 14	Tropical depression	Not specified	1002 hPa (29.65 inHg)	Taiwan	None	None	
13W	August 18 – 20	Tropical storm	75 km/h (47 mph)	998 hPa (29.47 inHg)	Japan	None	None	
TD	August 18 – 19	Tropical depression	Not specified	1004 hPa (29.65 inHg)	Palau	None	None	
TD	August 20	Tropical depression	Not specified	1002 hPa (29.65 inHg)	Taiwan	None	None	
Elaine (Miding)	August 21 – 29	Typhoon	120 km/h (75 mph)	965 hPa (28.50 inHg)	Philippines, South China	Minor	1	
TD	August 22 – 24	Tropical depression	Not specified	1008 hPa (29.77 inHg)	Korean Peninsula	None	None	
TD	August 26	Tropical depression	Not specified	1008 hPa (29.77 inHg)	Ryukyu Islands	None	None	
Faye	August 27 – September 10	Typhoon	165 km/h (103 mph)	935 hPa (27.61 inHg)	Mariana Islands, Taiwan	None	None	
Gloria (Norming)	August 27 – 31	Tropical storm	75 km/h (47 mph)	992 hPa (29.29 inHg)	Ryukyu Islands	None	None	
Hester	August 28 – September 1	Tropical storm	85 km/h (53 mph)	990 hPa (29.23 inHg)	Japan	None	None	
Oyang	August 29 – 30	Tropical depression	45 km/h (28 mph)	Not specified	Philippines	None	None	
TD	August 31 – September 2	Tropical depression	Not specified	1002 hPa (29.59 inHg)	None	None	None	
TD	September 2 – 7	Tropical depression	Not specified	1002 hPa (29.59 inHg)	Ryukyu Islands, Taiwan	None	None	
Irma (Ruping)	September 9 – 15	Typhoon	120 km/h (75 mph)	935 hPa (27.61 inHg)	Taiwan, Ryukyu Islands, Japan	None	6	
Pasing	September 9 – 15	Tropical depression	55 km/h (34 mph)	1004 hPa (29.65 inHg)	Vietnam	None	None	
Judy	September 9 – 17	Typhoon	150 km/h (93 mph)	950 hPa (28.05 inHg)	None	None	None	
TD	September 10 – 11	Tropical depression	55 km/h (34 mph)	1006 hPa (29.71 inHg)	Taiwan	None	None	
Susang	September 13 – 19	Tropical depression	55 km/h (34 mph)	1000 hPa (29.53 inHg)	Palau, Philippines, Vietnam	None	None	
TD	September 17	Tropical depression	Not specified	1008 hPa (29.77 inHg)	Palau	None	None	
Kit (Uding)	September 20 – 28	Severe tropical storm	95 km/h (59 mph)	990 hPa (29.23 inHg)	Philippines, South China, Vietnam	Unknown	Unknown	
Tering	September 21 – 22	Tropical depression	55 km/h (34 mph)	998 hPa (29.47 inHg)	Philippines	None	None	
TD	September 21 − 22	Tropical depression	Not specified	1008 hPa (29.77 inHg)	Ryukyu Islands	None	None	
Lola (Weling)	September 24 – October 5	Typhoon	130 km/h (81 mph)	965 hPa (28.50 inHg)	Philippines, South China	Unknown	Unknown	
Mamie	September 30 – October 5	Typhoon	130 km/h (81 mph)	960 hPa (28.35 inHg)	None	None	None	
TD	October 5	Tropical depression	Not specified	1004 hPa (29.65 inHg)	None	None	None	
Nina (Yaning)	October 5 – 17	Severe tropical storm	110 km/h (68 mph)	975 hPa (28.79 inHg)	Philippines, South China, Vietnam	Unknown	59	
Ora (Aning)	October 8 – 15	Typhoon	150 km/h (93 mph)	940 hPa (27.76 inHg)	Taiwan, Ryukyu Islands	None	None	
25W	October 11 – 14	Tropical depression	55 km/h (34 mph)	1000 hPa (29.53 inHg)	None	None	None	
26W (Bidang)	October 11 – 17	Tropical depression	55 km/h (34 mph)	1004 hPa (29.65 inHg)	Caroline Islands, Philippines	None	None	
Phyllis	October 15 – 23	Typhoon	150 km/h (93 mph)	955 hPa (28.20 inHg)	None	None	None	
Rita (Kading)	October 17 – 30	Typhoon	220 km/h (140 mph)	880 hPa (25.98 inHg)	Caroline Islands, Mariana Islands, Philippines	$100 million	>300	
Twenty-seven	October 29 – November 3	Tropical storm	65 km/h (40 mph)	994 hPa (29.35 inHg)	Philippines, Vietnam	None	None	
Tess	October 31 – November 7	Severe tropical storm	110 km/h (68 mph)	975 hPa (28.79 inHg)	Philippines, South China, Vietnam	None	None	
TD	November 9 – 11	Tropical depression	Not specified	1008 hPa (29.77 inHg)	Vietnam	None	None	
TD	November 10 – 12	Tropical depression	Not specified	1004 hPa (29.65 inHg)	Philippines	None	None	
TD	November 15 – 16	Tropical depression	Not specified	1008 hPa (29.77 inHg)	Vietnam	None	None	
30W (Delang)	November 16 – 20	Tropical depression	55 km/h (34 mph)	1000 hPa (29.53 inHg)	Philippines	None	None	
Viola (Esang)	November 17 – 24	Typhoon	195 km/h (121 mph)	910 hPa (26.97 inHg)	Caroline Islands	None	None	
TD	November 25 – December 1	Tropical depression	Not specified	1004 hPa (29.65 inHg)	Malaysia	None	None	
Winnie	November 25 – 30	Severe tropical storm	100 km/h (62 mph)	980 hPa (28.94 inHg)	Mariana Islands	None	None	
TD	December 4	Tropical depression	Not specified	1008 hPa (29.77 inHg)	None	None	None	
Garding	December 13 – 19	Tropical depression	55 km/h (34 mph)	1004 hPa (29.65 inHg)	Philippines	Unknown	None	
Season aggregates
63 systems	January 6 – December 19, 1978		220 km/h (140 mph)	880 hPa (25.98 inHg)		>$100 million	>404	

== See also ==
- Pacific typhoon season
- Tropical cyclones in 1978
- 1978 Pacific hurricane season
- 1978 Atlantic hurricane season
- 1978 North Indian Ocean cyclone season
- Australian region cyclone seasons: 1977–78, 1978–79
- South Pacific cyclone seasons: 1977–78, 1978–79
- South-West Indian Ocean cyclone seasons: 1977–78, 1978–79
