= List of Vietnam tornadoes =

A drill bit tornado in Hòa Bình, Hải Phòng on June 23, 2011.

The country of Vietnam experiences multiple tornadoes annually. Between 1993 and 2000, there were a total of 317 tornado occurrences in the country. Most of these tornadoes bring F1 intensities in the Fujita scale (F scale) but a very few documented tornadoes are able to reach F3 intensities. They typically form during monsoon-driven severe thunderstorms or typhoons. To date, studies that involve the country's tornado climatology are limited.

== Climatology ==
A tornado, also known as vòi rồng or lốc xoáy in Vietnamese, is a violently rotating column of air that descends from the base of a thunderstorm onto the ground. They are usually accompanied by thunderstorms or brought by typhoons. Tornadoes are associated with strong atmospheric instability, a characteristic of the rainy season. Weather fronts often increase the formation of tornadoes, when warm, most air is pushed upwards and collide with the cold, dry air, which then cools and condenses into moisture that triggers the formation of thunderstorms.

The country has a tropical climate that is influenced by monsoons. It has two distinct seasons: the dry season and the rainy season. The transitional periods of these seasons are favorable for tornadoes as atmospheric circulation provides the necessary conditions for severe weather events to develop, with it being the months from April to May in the north and May to August in the south.

Tornadoes appear in almost every region in the country, with most tornadoes located in Southern Vietnam, followed by Northern Vietnam, and lastly Central Vietnam with the least amount of tornadoes reported. These tornadoes occur most frequently in May around the country. In the north and central regions, high concentrations of tornadic activity appear from March to May, with April being the most frequent. Meanwhile, tornadic activity in the southern regions span from June to August.

The country's meteorological agency, NCHMF, stated that it is difficult to forecast tornadoes with accuracy due to their small size and duration. Instead, they can only issue general warnings when conditions are favorable for tornado development. Unlike storms and typhoons which can be monitored through radar, tornadoes appear suddenly in small areas and can only be detected through direct observation.

== Events ==
=== Pre-2000s ===
Event	Date	Area	Tornado(s)	Casualties	Notes	Sources
Hồ Chí Minh tornado	1 May 1904	Chợ Lớn, Hồ Chí Minh City	1	1 fatality	The earliest known report of a tornado in Vietnam. The tornado overturned a train carriage, torn off the roof of a train depot, destroying a thatch house, and killing a person after getting picked up and thrown Associated with a typhoon.	
Gia Lương district tornado	10 June 1961	Gia Lương, Bắc Ninh province	1	–	Several buffalos were thrown tens of meters away. The tornado was at least 7 km (4.35 mi) long and 10–20 m (33–66 ft) wide. It also broke several large trees in the area.	
Diễn Hải tornado	3 April 1983	Hải Châu, Nghệ An province	1	60 fatalities, several injuries	This is the deadliest tornado event in recorded history of Vietnam. 60 fisherman were killed as this tornado moves over open seas, mostly from drowning after their fishing boat capsized. Survivors describe seeing people and boats "violently thrown up into the air before falling back". Many families were all killed, mostly men.	
Hải Phòng tornado	16 April 1984	An Dương, Hồng Bàng, Thủy Nguyên, Hải Phòng	1	43+ fatalities, 109 injuries, 9 missing	A devasting tornado struck areas west of the city of Hải Phòng in the early morning hours of April 16, 1984. The tornado first touchdown at 02:05 a.m local time over the urban district of An Dương, south-southwest of the downtown area, moving east to east-northeast. It move through western parts of the downtown before crossing the Cam River, now moving north-northeast, impacting two more district: Hồng Bàng and Thủy Nguyên. The tornado damaged or completely obliterated over 324 homes, mostly brick and masonry house, knocking down 34 low and high-voltages power poles, destroying 2 substations, while depositing debris far distances, totaling up to 150 million VND (1984), or 2.5 trillion VND (2026). After being on the ground for 10 minutes, it dissipated over Thủy Nguyên district, north of the city. It traveled for at least 8 km, with an average width of around 200-250m wide, albeit its maximum width was around 800m. It killed at least 43 people, injuring 109 other and left 9 missing, presumably dead. This is the second deadliest tornado in Vietnam, and the deadliest in Hải Phòng City.	
Nghệ An tornado	19 August 1985	–	1	–	A tornado lifted a train carriage off the tracks at a station, several concrete bridge supports collapsed.	
Hải Phòng tornado	1985	–	1	–	A crane in the port area of Hải Phòng was collapsed by a tornado.	
Typhoon Becky	29 August 1990	Nam Ninh, Ninh Bình province	1	–	Outer bands of Typhoon Bekcy spawn this damaging tornado that struck 7 villages in Ninh Bình province. Unknown deaths and injuries.	
1997 Central Vietnam tornado outbreak	23 September 1997	–	1	4 fatalities	At least one tornado was confirmed in Central Vietnam, killing four people.	

=== 2000s ===
Event	Date	Area	Tornado(s)	Casualties	Notes	Sources
An Biên tornado	10 April 2000	Thứ Ba, Kiên Giang province	1	4 injuries	At 03:00 pm local time, a brief tornado touchdown near the town of Thứ Ba, An Biên district, where it collapse nearly 100 houses, 31 of which were completely destroyed, damaged 5 classrooms and a hospital. It also injured four people, including a baby.	
Đồng Tháp province tornadoes	23 August 2000	–	2	1 fatality, 77 injuries	Two tornadoes hit the southern part of the province, killing a 5-year-old girl and injuring 77 others.	
Phú Thọ and Hanoi tornadoes	3 April 2002	Tây Sơn, Phú Thọ province; Thanh Miếu, Hanoi	2	52 total injuries	a 20-Minute tornado that was accompanied by hailstorm struck Lap Thach district, Vinh Phuc province, where it destroyed 90 houses, damaged the roofs of 8,400 houses, damaged dozens of schools and hospitals, destroyed 2,000 hectares of crops, and injured 50 people. Another tornado accompanied by hailstorm struck Viet Tri, Phu Tho where it damaged the roofs of 290 houses and other public facilities, cause two transformers to explode and toppled 58 power poles, and injured two people. Total damages of the two tornadoes were estimated at 9 Billion VND.	
Vị Thủy tornado	31 July 2005	Vị Thủy, Cần Thơ province	1	3 injuries	A brief tornado was reported at 11:00 local time. 8 homes collapsed, along 23 others damaged.	
Kỳ Anh tornado	2 October 2006	Sông Trì, Kỳ Tân, Hà Tĩnh province	1	2 injuries	A rare early morning tornado struck four communes around 7:00 Am local time and lasted for 10-15 Minutes. It destroyed 100 houses including 11 houses that was completely damaged, 2.2 Km of 0.4 KV power lines were damaged, and injured 2 people were seriously injured.	
Northeast and Red River Delta tornado outbreak	19-21 November 2006	Bãi Cháy, Hải Phòng; Hạ Long Bay, Quảng Ninh province; Lục Nam, Bắc Ninh province; Hoài Đức, Hà Nội; Chợ Đồn, Thái Nguyên province	4	At least 19 fatalities, 4 missing, 50+ injuries	A extremely rare, unusual severe weather and tornado outbreak occurred across much of northern Vietnam, starting on November 19, when brief tornado in Lục Nam, Bắc Ninh province killed a child after a wall collapsed onto him. The next day saw multiple hailstorms across Phú Thọ province, Hanoi and several more province nearby, with two more tornadoes in Thái Nguyên and Phú Thọ provinces, killing another person. The 21st saw the deadliest tornado of the outbreak in the country history, as a rain-wrapped tornadic waterspout capsized a commercial cruise, killing 14 on board with 3 additional missing in Hạ Long Bay, Quảng Ninh. It then move onshore before collapsing 2 large containers crane, sweeping 1 into the bay at the Cái Lân port, killing another person, a worker who was in the crane at the time of the tornado. Many support trusses of the cranes were severely bent or completely snapped. Two more would be killed inland Hạ Long City after their house collapsed. A woman in Lan Hạ Bay, Hải Phòng province was also found deceased after her body washed ashore with her husband missing after their fishing boat capsized. The tornado also capsized 17 additional boats and ships, collapsing 150 booths at the 2006 Ha Long Trade Fair event in Hạ Long City. Over 200 homes were affected, over 50 injuries, 19 deaths and 4 missing were reported from the event as a whole.	
Long Hưng tornado	5 June 2007	Long Hưng, Tiên La, Lê Quý Đôn, Hưng Yên province	1	1 fatality, 5 injuries	A long lived tornado collapsed 57 houses, damaging 19 textile factories, toppled 19 power lines, 2 km of power line, and damaging 8.2 hectares of crops.	
Thiệu Quang tornado	9 June 2007	Thiệu Quang, Thanh Hóa province	1	3 injuries	233 homes were damaged or destroyed, along several schools and businesses.	
Triệu Sơn tornado	13 June 2007	Triệu Sơn, An Nông, Thanh Hóa province	1	2 fatalities, 2 injuries	A tornado moved through five communes around 6:30 Pm Local time, where it damaged 436 houses, ripped off the roofs of 10 classrooms, knocked down 16 power poles and many trees, destroyed a 350 hectares of newly planted rice. injured 2 people and killed 2 people, and the initial damage was estimated to about 1 billion VND.	
Tăng Nhơn Phú tornado	20 October 2008	Thủ Đức, Hồ Chí Minh City	1	None	A brief tornado impacted the HCMC University of Technical Education Campus, affecting 25 dorm rooms, along many equipment.	
Phong Nha tornado	24 March 2009	Phong Nha, Quảng Trị province	1	None	A tornado damaged the roofs of 270 houses, a power system, and destroyed hundreds of hectares fruit trees. Estimated damage amounts to more than 1 billion VND	
Cái Mép Port tornado	10 July 2009	Tân Phước, Hồ Chí Minh City	1	None	A hybrid tornado moved through areas of the then constructing Cái Mép port. No damages nor injuries were reported.	

=== 2010s ===
Event	Date	Area	Tornado(s)	Casualties	Notes	Sources
Tràng Việt tornado	25 August 2010	Mê Linh, Hanoi	1	5 injuries	Over 100 homes and traditional factories were damaged or destroyed, many trees were also uprooted.	
Phong Điền tornado	15 October 2010	Phong Điền, Huế	1	1 fatality, at least 2 injuries	This strong tornado damages or destroyed 60 homes and a local school, uprooting 20 hectares of rubber trees. 1 man died after being crush by a wall.	
Hy Cương tornado	8 May 2011	Hy Cương, Phú Thọ province	1	None	Over 100 large and old trees were uprooted near the Hùng Temple.	
Phú Thọ (district) tornado	11 June 2011	Phú Thọ, Đồng Tháp province	1	None	A brief tornado was reported. Unknown damage toll, although many homes were affected.	
Tropical Storm Haima	23 June 2011	Hòa Bình, Hải Phòng	1	2 fatalities, 55 injuries	A strong drill-bit tornado touchdown at approximately 17:30 local time, damaging nearly a thousand homes, many of which suffered complete roof loss. 2 brick homes were completely swept away at peak intensity. Two people were killed and 55 others were injured, some seriously. The tornado was rated as an EF3 tornado by Blue Ayanami with 165 Mph wind speed.	
Trà Vinh tornado	26 April 2012	Trà Vinh, Vĩnh Long province	1	3 injuries	99 homes were damaged, along many trees uprooted.	
Hồ Chí Minh City and Vĩnh Long tornadoes	3-4 May 2012	Vĩnh Lộc, Hồ Chí Minh City; Bình Đại, Vĩnh Long province	2	28 injuries	A small outbreak event occurred across 2 days in 2 provinces. A brief tornado impacted 60 homes, most lost their roofs in Vĩnh Lộc, Hồ Chí Minh City. A much more destructive tornado happened the next day in Bình Đại, Vĩnh Long, where 268 homes were damaged, 23 others collapsed, injuring 28 people.	
Xuân Giang tornado	24 July 2012	Xuân Giang, Ninh Bình province	1	1 injuries	A strong drill-bit tornado damaged or destroyed 49 homes, along downing 240m of electrical transmission lines.	
Lĩnh Sơn tornado	18 April 2013	Lĩnh Sơn, Thanh Hóa province	1	None	13 homes collapsed, along 25 other damaged by this tornado.	
Lĩnh Nam tornado	20 May 2013	Lĩnh Nam, Hanoi	1	None	A brief tornado touchdown at 21:00 local time, damaging 11 homes and businesses. Trees were uprooted, along several farms, killing many ducks.	
Cần Thơ tornadoes	22-23 September 2013	Mỹ Qưới, Tân Long, Vĩnh Phước, Cần Thơ	2	9 injuries	Two nocturnal tornadoes were reported, injuring 9 and damaging a total of 149 homes.	
Typhoon Nari	15-16 October 2013	Ba Đồn, Lệ Thủy, Quảng Trị province; Hà Huy Tập, Thạch Hà, Hà Tĩnh province	4	3 fatalities, 26 injuries	An outbreak from Typhoon Nari occurred across 2 provinces in the North Central Coast of Vietnam. A brief damaging tornado touchdown in Mỹ Thủy district, Quảng Trị, with several homes damaged on the evening of the 15th. The next day, at 01:00 am local time, another, more destructive and deadly tornado impacted Quảng Sơn and Quảng Minh districts in Quảng Trị, killing 3 and injuring 26 others. At least 300 homes were damaged or completely destroyed, with many being submerged under rising flood waters. A third tornado would touchdown in Hà Huy Tập ward, Hà Tĩnh, and a fourth few minutes later in Thạch Thắng district, with both causing additional damages to more infastructures. Over 320 homes were affected as a result of the outbreak.	
Cờ Đỏ district tornado	30 July 2014	Cờ Đỏ, Cần Thơ	1	5 injuries	At approximately 07:00 local time, a sudden tornado struck the central area of Cờ Đỏ District. Official reports indicated that the tornado caused damage to 159 houses, of which 57 were completely destroyed and 102 sustained roof loss. Additionally, four government offices were damaged, 40 utility poles were knocked down, and five people were injured.	
Bình Đại tornado	25 May 2015	Bình Đại, Vĩnh Long province	1	2 injuries	A brief tornado damaged 42 homes, with 8 others collapsed.	
Hanoi derecho	13 June 2015	–	2	–	A destructive derecho event impacted much of the Hanoi metropolitan areas and spawned at least 2 tornadoes in the outskirts, with many structures damaged or destroyed. The derecho as a whole killed 2 and injured 5 others, though unknown casualties were directly related to the tornadoes.	
Tropical Storm Mirinae	28 July 2016	Yên Phong, Bắc Ninh province	1	None	Outer bands of Tropical Storm Mirinae spawn this multi-vortex tornado, impacting a local market, destroying many poorly built shops and booths. It then hit a warehouse in the Yên Phong Industrial Park, shreading parts of its roof off. The same area would be hit again by a different tornado in 2025.	
Nghĩa Lộc tornado	1 August 2016	Nghĩa Lộc, Nghệ An province	1	None	A brief tornado knocked down many trees and power pooles.	
Đồng Thuận tornado	21 September 2016	Đồng Thuận, Quảng Tri province	1	None	30 homes were damaged, along 10 tons of rice paddy spoiled after being exposed to the rain.	
Typhoon Damrey	4 November 2017	Núi Thành, Mộ Đức, Bình Sơn, Đà Nẵng	3	15 injuries	A localize tornado outbreak impacted several communities in Đà Nẵng as a part from Typhoon Damrey. The first tornado touchdown in Đức Phong commune, Mộ Đức district, unroofing 40 homes and knocking down many electric poles. 2 more tornadoes would also touchdown in Bình An commune, Bình Sơn district and Tam Hải island commune, Núi Thành district respectively, collapsing 2 house with 11 injuries, 4 serious. It also damaged 96 others. In total 136 houses were impacted with 3 injuries.	
Gia Lộc tornado	16 August 2018	Gia Lộc, Nguyễn Trãi, Hải Phòng	1	None	16 homes and outbuildings were damaged, along over 3,000 chickens killed by this brief tornado that lasted 2 minutes.	
Bảo Lộc tornado	11 March 2019	2 Bảo Lộc, Lâm Đồng	1	None	Several homes were affected. The local old Office of the People's Committee of Bao Loc City were badly damaged, causing many state documents to become water-damaged.	
Quế An tornado	30-31 March 2019	Quế Sơn, Nam Giang, Đà Nẵng	2	None	2 tornadoes were reported. The first on the 30th in Quế An district, Quế Sơn, damaging 20 homes and many rice fields. A second occurred the next day in Nam Giang, flattening large swaths of forest.	
Na Ngoi tornadoes	6 April 2019	Na Ngoi, Nghệ An province	1	None	2 tornadoes impacted the district within 12 days. Heavy damages occurred to many homes and farms.	
Na Ngoi tornadoes	18 April 2019	Na Ngoi, Nghệ An province	1	None	2 tornadoes impacted the district within 12 days. Heavy damages occurred to many homes and farms.	
Reunification Day outbreak	30 April 2019	Hương Sơn, Hương Khê, Nghi Xuân, Hà Tĩnh province	3	None	A small outbreak occurred in Hà Tĩnh province on the country's 44th Reunification Day Anniversary. All three tornadoes were very brief but extensive damages still occurred. Many homes completely lost their roofs, and many fruit farms were affected.	
Anh Sơn tornado	20 July 2019	Anh Sơn, Nghệ An province	1	None	Several homes were damaged, and many trees were uprooted.	

=== 2020s ===
Event	Date	Area	Tornado(s)	Casualties	Notes	Sources
Northern Vietnam cold spell	3-4 March 2020	–	1	1 fatality	A cold spell brought numerous thunderstorms that hit seven provinces in Northern Vietnam, resulting in multiple damages to structures and agricultural crops. A total of 5 people died from the event, with one of them killed from a tornado in northeast Vietnam. The cold spell also left at least 17 people injured.	
Dầu Giây tornado	25 April 2020	Dầu Giây, Đồng Nai province	1	None	Large areas of durian trees were snapped or uprooted. Several farms houses were also affected. Large hail was reported with this storm.	
Tri Lễ tornado	7 May 2020	Tri Lễ, Nghệ An province	1	None	1 house completely collapsed, along 41 others damaged. Crops damaged. Est. total damage at 200 million VND (2020).	
Bác Ái tornado	27 May 2020	Bác Ái, Khanh Hòa province	1	None	A significant tornado impacted areas of Bác Ái district, collapsing 35 homes while damaging 75 others. Crops were also damaged, along power lines being downed.	
Trung Mỹ tornado	10 June 2020	Bình Tuyền, Phú Thọ province	1	3 fatalities, 18 injuries	A strong yet short-lived tornado impacted a wood-processing in Trung Mỹ commune, Phú Thọ province, destroying much of the facility. Several large wood logs were thrown into a nearby ditch. 3 workers were killed along 18 others injured when the building collapsed.	
June 2020 Hà Tĩnh province outbreak	12-13 June 2020	Hương Sơn, Vũ Quang, Hương Khê, Hà Tĩnh province	3	None	Severe thunderstorms spawned 3 brief tornadoes on 2 different days in Hà Tĩnh province, damaging 27 homes and a school, downing power lines and large swaths of trees.	
Hậu Lộc Beach tornado	14 June 2020	Vạn Lộc, Thanh Hóa province	1	None	A large tornadic waterspout was spotted offshores.	
Hội An tornado	24 June 2020	Hội An, Kiên Giang province	1	5 injuries	At least 3 districts were affected, with 180 homes damaged or destroyed. Several high voltages power lines were also snapped.	
Thăng Trường tornado	11 October 2020	Thăng Trường, Thăng Điền, Đà Nẵng	1	None	40 homes lost their roofs, along several power poles collapsed.	
Tân Hương tornado	14 October 2020	Tân Hương, Đồng Tháp province	1	None	A large, strong tornado destroyed two large warehouse in an industrial park, with one completely collapsed to the ground. Many roof shingles were thrown onto several residential areas. No injuries were reported due to the factory having no working worker at the time.	
Đinh Trang Thượng tornado	22 March 2021	Đinh Trang Thượng, Lâm Đồng province	1	2 injuries	70 homes were damaged, injuring 2 people from flying debris, with 7 others collapsed. Large coffee farms were affected.	
Giồng Riềng tornado	22 July 2021	Giồng Riềng, Kiên Giang province	1	15 injuries	A rare early morning tornado damaged or destroyed at least 62 homes in at least 3 different wards and districts, resulting in 15 injuries, 2 serious.	
Tân Lộc Bắc tornado	25 July 2021	Hòa Thành, Cà Mau province	1	1 fatality, 3 injuries	This nocturnal tornado impacted 6 homes, 2 of which completely collapsed. In one of the collapsed house, a family was crushed when a brick wall and debris fell onto them, killing one and injuring 3 others.	
Phú Sơn Tây tornado	27 October 2021	Hòa Tiến, Đà Nẵng	1	None	A brief tornado damages around 18 homes, with 4 completely unroofed. No casualties were reported.	
Long Hồ tornado	29 June 2023	Long Hồ, Mang Thít, Tam Bình, Vĩnh Long province	1	None	A total of 46 homes were damaged in 3 district after damaging tornado touchdown. No casualties were reported.	
Liên Hòa tornado	13 May 2024	Liên Hòa, Quảng Ninh province	1	None	A total of 71 homes were damaged, trees and power poles were knocked down.	
Hòa Thuận tornado	9 October 2024	Hòa Thuận, Ngọc Chúc, Vĩnh Thạnh, Kiên Giang province	1	12 injuries	This damaging tornado damaged 67 homes, many completely collapsed, with 12 injuries reported. Large swaths of trees was also uprooted by this tornado.	
Đắk Lắk tornadoes	22-23 November 2024	Đông Hòa, Hòa Xuân, Đắk Lắk province	2	None	Two brief tornadoes were reported, the first in Hòa Xuân district, damaging three homes. A second tornado occurred the next day, damaging parts of the Hòa Hiệp Industrial Park.	
An Biên tornado	30 May 2025	An Biên, Kiên Giang province	1	None	At approximately 08:30 local time, a tornado hit Nam Yen Commune in An Biên district, damaging at least 6 homes.	
Typhoon Kajiki	25-26 August 2025	Kim Bàng, Lý Thường Kiệt, Ninh Bình province; Nông Cống, Thanh Hóa province; Yên Phong, Bắc Ninh province; Đông Ngạc, Hanoi	5	1 fatality, 14 injured	Two days of tornadic activity began late in the evening on August 25, when a powerful tornado struck Kim Bảng district in Ninh Bình province. The tornado, though lasting only a few minutes, caused extensive damage to more than 200 homes and businesses. An 88-year-old woman was killed after a wall collapsed onto her, and 14 others were hospitalized with injuries. The following day, four additional tornadoes were reported across northern Vietnam. The first was confirmed in Nông Cống District, Thanh Hóa through videos recorded by local residents. Two more tornadoes occurred in Hanoi, and another tornado touched down in Yên Phong district of Bắc Ninh province. In total, the two-day outbreak resulted in 1 fatality and 14 reported injuries.	
Vật Lại tornado	30 August 2025	Ba Vì, Hanoi	1	None	The remnants of Typhoon Kajiki produces a series of storms, one of which became tornadic and produce a large, multi-vortex tornado in Vật Lại commune, Ba Vì, Hanoi. The tornado damages or destroyed at least 25 homes and businesses in the community.	
Typhoon Bualoi	27-29 September 2025	Quảng Điền, Huế; Hải Thịnh, Hải Anh, Quỹ Nhất, Khánh Nhạc, Yên Khánh, Ninh Bình province; Thái Thụy, Hưng Yên province; Vĩnh Bảo, Hải Phòng; Đầm Hà, Vân Đồn, Quảng Ninh province; Thượng Cát, Hanoi	8	11 fatalities, 45 injuries	Typhoon Bualoi spawned a large and historical tornado outbreak across much of the Red River Delta. On September 27, a tornado hit Quảng Điền district, Huế, where it damaged 75 homes with no casualties were reported. The next, a brief tornado was reported on Quan Lạn Island, Quảng Ninh province, damaging several homes, downing more than 10 power and transmissions poles, causing the whole island to lose power. On September 29, multiple tornadoes struck the Red River Delta. At 05:00 am local time, a strong tornado torn through Hải Thịnh and Quỹ Nhất districts, Ninh Bình, killing 4 and injuring many more. Few minutes later another tornado impacted Hải Anh district, Ninh Bình, killing another person and collapsing 4 homes, with an additional 200 being unroofed. The most destructive tornado would touched down later in the day in Hải Thịnh district again, and moved across several southern districts, killing 4 more and injuring at least 25 others. In Khánh Nhạc district, it swept a two-story billiard hall from its foundation, scattering debris downwind, before dissipating after being at least an hour on the ground. Another tornado struck Thái Thụy district in Hưng Yên province, killing two people and injuring at least eight. Two more tornadoes struck Vĩnh Bảo district in Hải Phòng, and Đầm Hà district in Quảng Ninh province, resulting in 12 additional injuries. Another tornado was a short-lived in Thượng Cát Ward in Hanoi, though no casualties were reported. In total, there are 11 fatalities and 45 were injured, making it the largest tornado outbreak in Vietnam's history.	
Typhoon Matmo	7 October 2025	Chu Văn An, Hải Phòng	1	None	A tornado hit Chu Van An Ward in Hải Phòng at around 04:00 local time. resulting in damages to several homes and farms, though no casualties were reported.	
Thanh Tùng tornado	28 October 2025	Đầm Dơi, Cà Mau province	1	None	At approximately 21:00 local time, a tornado hit Thanh Tùng commune where it damaged at least 15 homes and several shrimp farms with total estimated damage of approximately 910 million VND.	
Typhoon Kalmaegi	6 November 2025	Sơn Tịnh, Quảng Ngãi province	1	None	A brief tornado touchdown in Long Phụng comunne, Quảng Ngãi province, damaging 45 homes. No casualties were reported.	
2025 Central Vietnam tornado outbreak	16-17 November 2025	Chiên Đàn, Đà Nẵng; Nguyễn Nghiêm, Quảng Ngãi province; Bình Định, Gia Lai province	3	4 injuries	A midnight outbreak of severe weather impacted across Central Vietnam, including 3 reported tornadoes. The first impacted Phú Ninh, Đà Nẵng, damaging 56 homes, injuring 4 people. 2 more tornadoes would touchdown on the morning of the 17th in Nguyễn Nghiêm, Quảng Ngãi province and Bình Định ward, Gia Lai province, damaging an additional 31 homes.	
Ba Vì tornado	3 March 2026	Ba Vì, Quảng Ngãi	1	None	At around 16:30 local time, a tornado damaged 116 houses and several crops in Ba Vì commune. Homes had their roofs blown off and trees were uprooted as the tornado hit the area for around 30 minutes before dissipating.	
Thượng Bằng La tornado	21-22 March 2026	Thượng Bằng La, Lào Cai province	1	2 injuries	A multi-day severe weather event unfold across much of northern Vietnam, including this tornado during midnight in Thượng Bằng La district, Lào Cai, damaging over 600 homes (included those affect by severe winds). Large hail was also reported with this storm complex.	
Lao Bảo tornado	15 April 2026	Lao Bảo, Quảng Trị province	1	None	A communal building were damaged, along 9 homes. Large swaths of tree were also toppled.	
Hồng Sơn tornado	2 June 2026	Hồng Sơn, Lâm Đồng province	1	None	A brief tornado damaged at least several homes in hamlet 4 in Hồng Sơn district, Lâm Đồng.	
Đạ Huoai 2 tornado	5 June 2026	Đạ Huoai 2, Lâm Đồng province	1	None	Multiple durian farms were affected, with many durian trees uprooted, with 50 ton of the fruit fell to the ground.	
Sơn Linh, Phú Nghĩa tornadoes	15-16 June 2026	Sơn Hà, Quảng Ngãi province; Phú Nghĩa, Đồng Nai	1	1 fatality	2 tornadoes were reported, with the first in Sơn Hà, Quảng Ngãi province, damaging several homes. A second one touchdown the next day in Đồng Nai, killing a man after a tree fell onto him.	
An Cư tornado	26 June 2026	Trà Giang, Quảng Ngãi province	1	None	Several homes lost their roofs. Hail was also reported with the storm.	
Bình Thanh tornado	8 July 2026	Kiến Xương, Hưng Yên province	1	None	A large, highly visible drill-bit tornado tracked over rural farm fields, though several home were impacted. No known casualties.	
Mekong Delta outbreak	12-13 July 2026	Khánh Bình, Trần Văn Thời, Trí Phải, Lương Thế Trân, Tân Hưng, Cà Mau province; Vĩnh Thạch, Cần Thơ province	3	4 injuries	A localize outbreak of at least three tornadoes were reported across two provinces in the Mekong Delta. On July 12, a brief but damaging tornado tracked across Vĩnh Thạch district, Cần Thơ province, with 22 homes and businesses damaged. The next day, a relatively long-lived tornado impacted at least 4 different commune and ward in Cà Mau province, the worst in Khánh Bình district, damaging 75 homes and a school, injuring 4 people. An 11-year-old boy was thrown several meters, luckily only suffering minor injuries. Another brief tornado was also reported later that night in Tân Hưng district, Cà Mau, damaging 4 homes.	
Thuận Bắc and Phan Rang tornadoes	23 July 2026	Phan Rang, Thuận Bắc, Khánh Hòa province	2	None	Two brief but damaging tornadoes were reported. Two schools suffered extensive damages, and many trees were uprooted.	
Đá Bạc tornado	28 July 2026	Đá Bạc, Cà Mau province	1	1 injury	A brief nocturnal tornado damaged 27 home, mostly poorly built farm houses. One women was injured by debris.	
Dak Nhau tornado	11 August 2026	Dak Nhau, Đồng Nai City	1	None	A large multivortex tornado was reported via video evidences. Nine homes were affect, with two completely collapsed.	
Trà Lĩnh tornado	12 August 2026	Trà Lĩnh, Quang Hán, Quảng Uyên, Đức Long, Cao Bằng province	1	None	A long-lived tornado impacted 4 different districts, damaging 47 homes and farms. Strong winds is also associated with this tornado.	
Hàm Thuận Nam tornado	18 August 2026	Hàm Thuận Nam, Lâm Đồng province	1	None	Nine homes had their roofs blown off, along many downed power poles.	
Đạ Huoai 2 and la Chia tornadoes	19-20 August 2026	Đạ Huoai 2, Lâm Đồng province; la Chia, Gia Lai province	2	None	2 tornadoes were reported. The first damaged 23 homes, knocking down power poles on the 19th in la Chia, Gia Lai province. The next, another tornado uprooted over 500 durian trees in a farm in at least 3 villages in Lâm Đồng.	
Đất Mũi tornado	25 August 2026	Đất Mũi, Cà Mau province	1	None	A short-lived tornado collapsed a home and downing many trees.	
Lạc Đạo tornado	10 September 2026	Lạc Đạo, Hưng Yên province	1	None	A short-lived anticyclonic tornado was reported, causing damages to at least 2 homes and a factory. It also downed power lines. This is the first confirmed anticyclonic tornado in Vietnam.	
September Vietnam Tropical Depression	13 September 2026	An Hải, Đà Nẵng City	1	1	This weak tornado toppled 3 electric poles, damaging a playground with some inflatable castle being thrown. It also showed multiple-vortices charateristic inside its parent circulations.	
Nguyễn Phích tornado	28 September 2026	Nguyễn Phích, Cà Mau province	1	None	This significant tornado damaged or destroyed 12 homes, toppling many trees.	
Xẻo Cui tornado	29 October 2026	Giồng Riềng, An Giang province	1	None	Brief tornado, damaging 5 homes, downing powerlines.	
Đăk Lôi tornado	4 November 2026	Ngọc Réo, Quảng Ngãi province	1	None	A weakly built communal house sustained damages, at least 1 home were damaged, 2 low-voltage utility pole were snapped. 20 residents lost power.	
Hậu Mỹ tornado	9 November 2026	Hậu Mỹ, Đồng Tháp province	1	None	28 homes and businesses were damaged, along 3 hectares of crops.	
Long Phụng tornado	10 November 2026	Long Phụng, Quảng Ngãi province	1	None	22 homes sustained varying degrees of damages, most loss their roofs	

== Deadliest tornadoes ==
Deadliest Vietnam tornadoes
Rank	Areas	Date	Fatalities
1	Diễn Hải, Nghệ An	April 3, 1983	60
2	Hải Phòng City	April 16, 1984	43
3	Cái Lân Port, Quảng Ninh	November 21, 2006	17
4	Central Vietnam	September 23, 1997	4
4	Hải Thịnh, Ninh Bình	September 29, 2025	4
4	Yên Khánh, Ninh Bình	September 29, 2025	4
5	Quảng Sơn, Quảng Trị	October 16, 2013	3
5	Bình Tuyền, Phú Thọ	June 10, 2020	3
6	Triệu Sơn, Thanh Hóa	June 13, 2007	2

== See also ==
- List of Asian tornadoes and tornado outbreaks
- List of tropical cyclones spawning tornadoes
- Tropical cyclones in Vietnam
