= List of disasters in Vietnam by death toll =

The list of disasters in Vietnam by death toll includes major disasters and accidents - excluding warfare and other intentional acts - that took place on Vietnamese soil and resulted in 10 or more fatalities:

== List ==
Disaster	Type	Location	Deaths	Date	References
COVID-19 pandemic	Pandemic	Nationwide	43,206+	2020 to 2026	
1904 typhoon	Typhoon	Nationwide (Note: Unknown exact location)	~4,000	7-12 September 1904	
Tropical Storm Linda	Typhoon	Southern Vietnam	3,111	November 1997	
Typhoon Haiphong	Typhoon	Haiphong	3,000	October 1881	
1904 Thua Thien Hue Tsunami	Tsunami	Thừa Thiên Huế	724	11 September 1904	
1999 Vietnamese floods	Flood	Central Vietnam	622	October–November 1999	
Đồng Nai train derailment	Train derailment	Đồng Nai province	200+	17 March 1982	
Typhoon Yagi and Northern Vietnam floods	Typhoon, flood	Northern Vietnam	325	7 September 2024	
Typhoon Damrey	Typhoon	Central Vietnam	106	November 18, 2017	
2020 Central Vietnam floods	Flood	Central Vietnam	249	October–November 2020	
Tropical Storm Ruth	Typhoon, flood	Northern Central Vietnam	164	September 1980	
Tropical Storm Kammuri	Typhoon, flood	Northern Vietnam	127	August 2008	
Ho Chi Minh City ITC fire	Fire	Ho Chi Minh City	60	29 October 2002	
Diễn Hải tornado	Tornado	Nghệ An province	60	3 April 1983	
2023 Hanoi building fire	Fire	Hanoi	56	13 September 2023	
Collapse of Cần Thơ Bridge	Construction collapse	Cần Thơ	55	26 September 2007	
Capsizing of the Wonder Sea	Boat sinking	Quảng Ninh province	39	19 July 2025	
2022 Binh Duong karaoke bar fire	Fire	Ho Chi Minh City	32	6 September 2022	
2018 Northern Vietnam floods	Flood	Northern Vietnam	23	23 June 2018	
Quảng Ngãi skin disease outbreak	Disease	Quảng Ngãi province	19	21 April 2012	
Cái Lân port tornado	Tornado	Quảng Ninh province	17	21 November 2006	
Tropical Storm Kaemi	Typhoon	Central Vietnam	17	22-24 August 2000	
MS Bulk Jupiter	Boat sinking	Coast of Vũng Tàu	16	1 January 2015	
Trung Kính street fire	Fire	Hanoi	15	24 May 2024	
Trần Thái Tông street fire	Fire	Hanoi	13	1 November 2016	
