= Tân Hưng =

Tân Hưng may refer to:

- Tân Hưng district, Long An province, Vietnam
- Tân Hưng, Ho Chi Minh City, Vietnam
- Tân Hưng, Cà Mau, Vietnam
- Tân Hưng, Bà Rịa; now is Long Hương, Ho Chi Minh City, Vietnam
- Tân Hưng, Bắc Giang; now is Lạng Giang, Bắc Ninh, Vietnam

== See also ==
- Tân Hưng Đông, Cái Nước district, Cà Mau province; now is Cái Nước, Cà Mau province
- Tân Hưng Tây, Cái Nước district, Cà Mau province; now is Nguyễn Việt Khái, Cà Mau province
