= Phú Hưng =

Phú Hưng may refer to several places in Vietnam, including:

- Phú Hưng, Bến Tre, a commune of Bến Tre city
- Phú Hưng, Cà Mau, a commune of Cái Nước District
- Phú Hưng, An Giang, a commune of Phú Tân District, An Giang
