= Phú Tân district, Cà Mau =

Coordinates: 8°56′28″N 104°51′25″E

Phú Tân district Huyện Phú Tân
- District
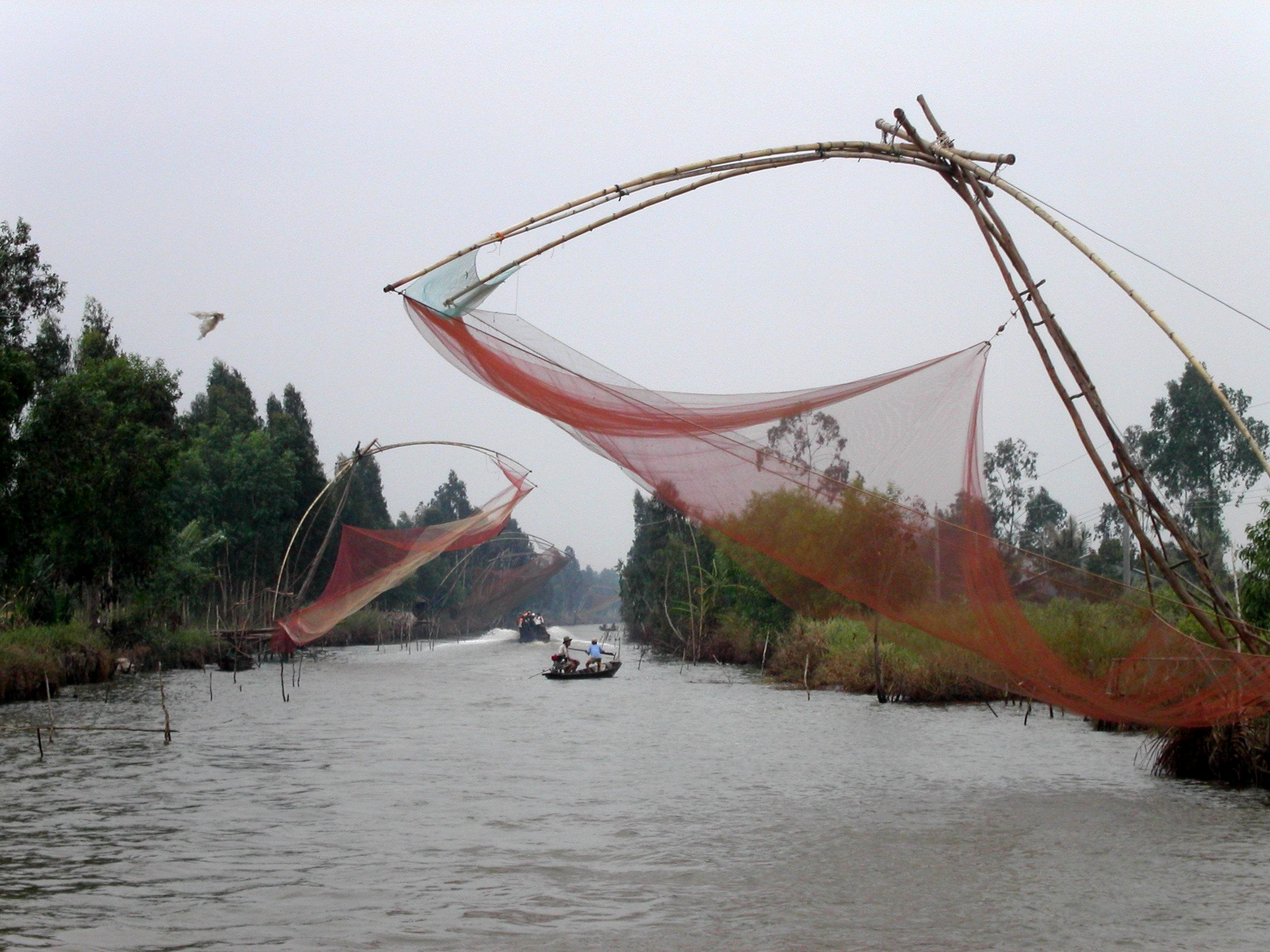
- Fishing in Phú Tân.

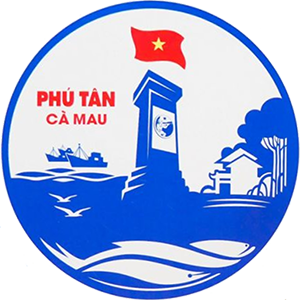
- Seal

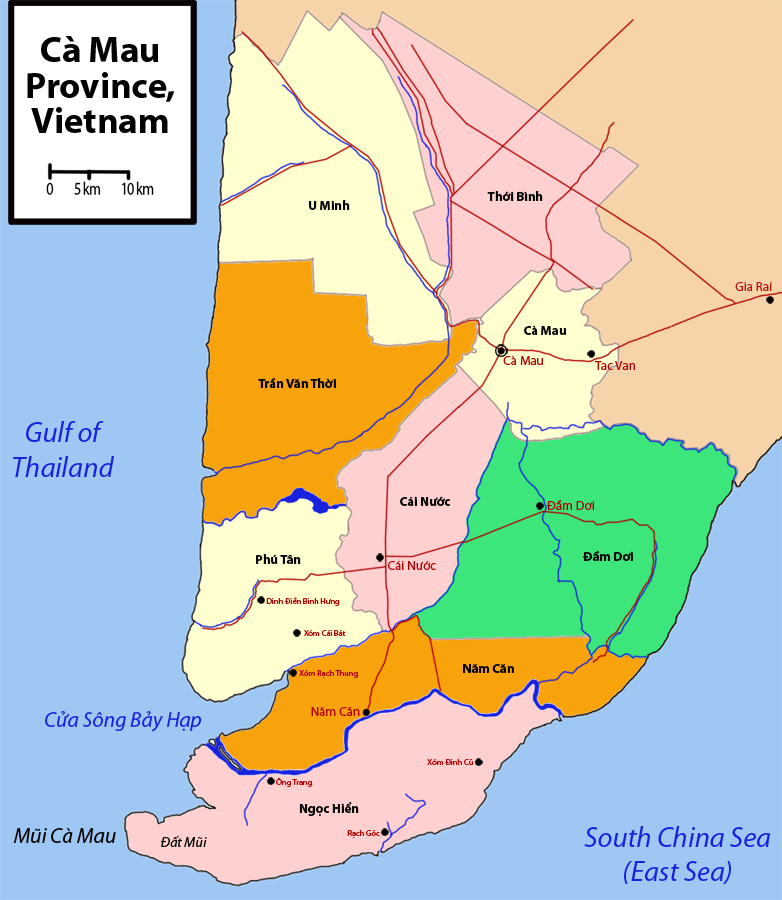
- Districts of Cà Mau province
- Country: Vietnam
- Province: Cà Mau
- Capital: Cái Đôi Vàm

Area
  - Total: 164 sq mi (426 km^{2})

Population (2018)
  - Total: 118,940
- Time zone: UTC+07:00 (Indochina Time)

Phú Tân is a former rural district of Cà Mau province in the Mekong Delta region of Vietnam.

== Geography ==
As of 2003 the district had a population of 111,791. The district covers an area of 426 km^{2}. The district capital lies at Cái Đôi Vàm.

Phú Tân was created via government decree no. 138/2003/NĐ-CP on November 17, 2003, after being split off from Cái Nước district. Phú Tân borders Cái Nước district to the east, ocean to the west, Năm Căn district to the south and Trần Văn Thời district to the north. At the time of its creation, it spanned 446 km^{2} and had a population of 109,642.

After the passing on 16 June 2025, Phú Tân was split into 4 communes.

== Divisions ==
Before 2025, the district is subdivided into 9 commune-level subdivisions, including the township of Cái Đôi Vàm and the rural communes of: Phú Mỹ, Phú Tân, Phú Thuận, Rạch Chèo, Tân Hải, Việt Thắng, Tân Hưng Tây and Nguyễn Việt Khái.

In 2025, the Area is rearranged into 4 communes: Phu Tan, Pha My, Cai Doi Vam, Nguyen Viet Khai.
