= Phú Thuận =

Phú Thuận may refer to several commune-level subdivisions in Vietnam, including

- Phú Thuận, Ho Chi Minh City, a ward of District 7, Ho Chi Minh City
- Phú Thuận, Huế, a ward of Huế
- Phú Thuận, Bến Tre, a commune of Bình Đại District
- Phú Thuận, Cà Mau, a commune of Phú Tân District, Cà Mau Province
- Phú Thuận, Phú Vang, a commune of Phú Vang District in Thừa Thiên-Huế Province
- Phú Thuận, An Giang, a commune of Thoại Sơn District

== See also ==
- The communes of Phú Thuận A and Phú Thuận B in Hồng Ngự District
