= Hưng Mỹ =

Hưng Mỹ may refer to several places in Vietnam, including:

- Hưng Mỹ, Cà Mau, a rural commune of Cái Nước District.
- Hưng Mỹ, Nghệ An, a rural commune of Hưng Nguyên District.
- Hưng Mỹ, Trà Vinh, a rural commune of Châu Thành District, Trà Vinh.
