= Thạnh Phú =

Thạnh Phú may refer to several places in Vietnam, including

- Thạnh Phú District, a rural district of Bến Tre Province
- Thạnh Phú (township), a township and capital of Thạnh Phú District
- Thạnh Phú, Cần Thơ, a commune of Cờ Đỏ District
- Thạnh Phú, Cà Mau, a commune of Cái Nước District
- Thạnh Phú, Trà Vinh, a commune of Cầu Kè District
- Thạnh Phú, Tiền Giang, a commune of Châu Thành District, Tiền Giang Province
- Thạnh Phú, Sóc Trăng, a commune of Mỹ Xuyên District
- Thạnh Phú, Long An, a commune of Thạnh Hóa District
- Thạnh Phú, Đồng Nai, a commune of Vĩnh Cửu District

== See also ==
- Thạnh Phú Đông, a commune of Giồng Trôm District in Bến Tre Province
