= Lý Văn Lâm, Cà Mau =

Ward of Cà Mau province

Lý Văn Lâm
- Ward
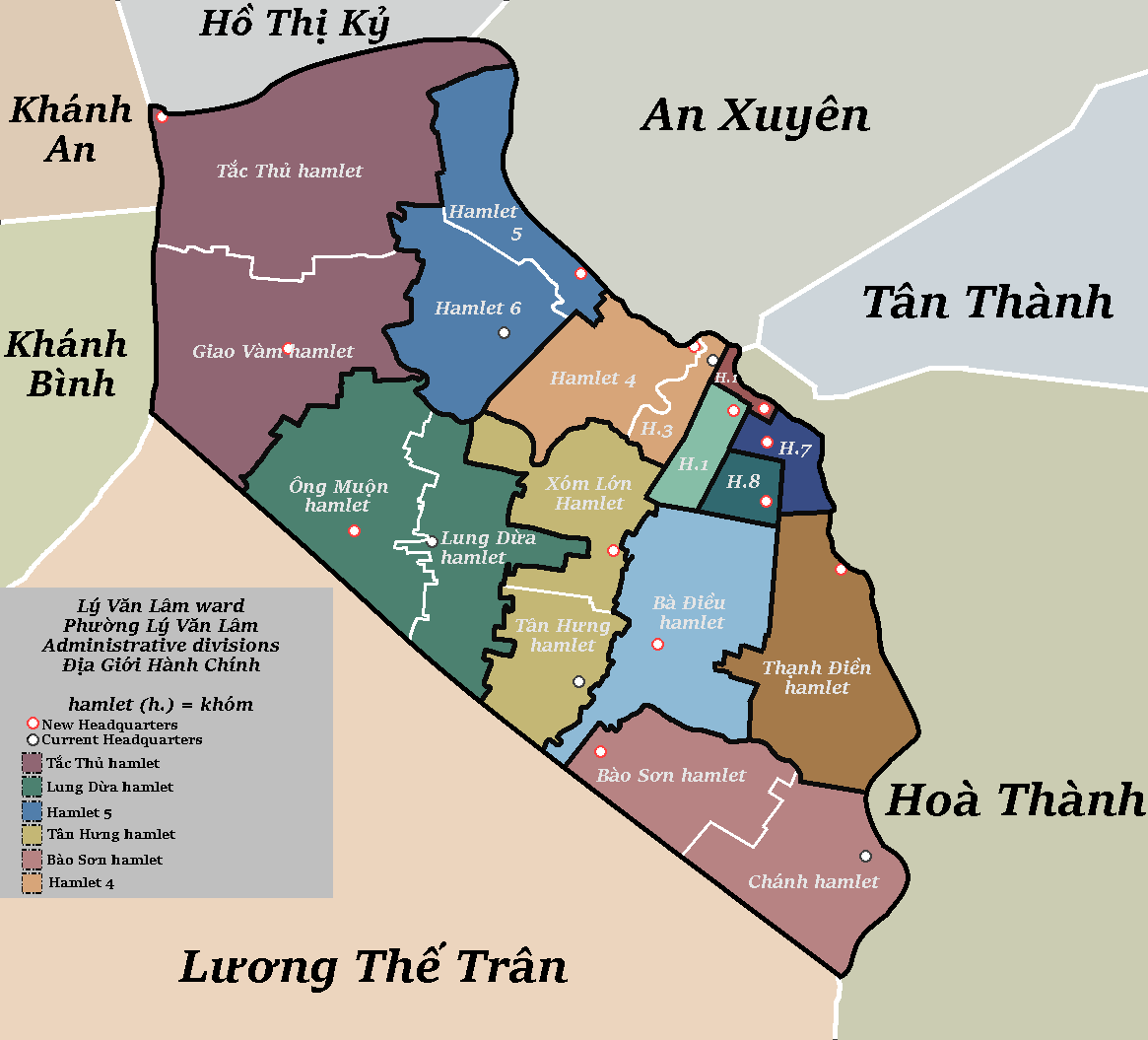

- Location within Vietnam
- Country: Vietnam
- Province: Cà Mau Province

Government
  - Secretary of CPV: Dương Minh Em
  - Chairman of People's Council: Đặng Văn Vẹn

Area
  - Total: 17.59 sq mi (45.56 km^{2})

Population
  - Total: 51.345
  - Density: 2.919/sq mi (1.127/km^{2})
- Time zone: UTC+7 (UTC+7)
- Area code: 32014
- Website: lyvanlam.camau.gov.vn

Lý Văn Lâm (Phường Lý Văn Lâm) is a ward (phường) of Cà Mau Province in the Mekong Delta region of Vietnam.

== History ==
On December 20th 1975, the Politburo of the Communist Party of Vietnam issued Resolution No. 19/NQ, adjusting the provincial merger in South Vietnam to better reflect the actual situation. Accordingly, Cà Mau and Bạc Liêu provinces were merged on January 1, 1976, initially under the name Cà Mau - Bạc Liêu province. At that time, Lý Văn Lâm commune belonged to Châu Thành district, Cà Mau - Bạc Liêu province.

On March 10th 1976, the Cpentral Party and Government Representative Office renamed Cà Mau - Bạc Liêu province to Minh Hải province. At that time, Lý Văn Lâm commune belonged to Châu Thành district, Minh Hải province.

On July 11th 1977, the Government Council issued Decision 181-CP on the dissolution of Châu Thành district and the merger of Lý Văn Lâm commune from Châu Thành district into Trần Thời district.

On December 29th 1978, the Government Council issued Decision 326-CP. Accordingly, Lý Văn Lâm commune, formerly belonging to Trần Thời district, was transferred to the newly established Cà Mau district.

On July 25th 1979, the Government Council issued Decision 275-CP defining the boundaries of Lý Văn Lâm commune as follows:

+ North: bordering Tắc Thủ River (Tân Lợi commune)

+ East: bordering Cà Mau town

+ West: bordering Trần Thời district

+ South: bordering Thạnh Phú commune.

On August 30th 1983, the Council of Ministers issued Decision 94-HĐBT on the dissolution of Cà Mau district as follows:

- Merging Lý Văn Lâm commune of Cà Mau district into Cà Mau town.

- Merging 1/3 of Sở Tại hamlet of Thạnh Phú commune (Cà Mau district) into Lý Văn Lâm commune.

- Merging 1/3 of ông Muộng hamlet of Lý Văn Lâm commune (Ca Mau town) into Thạch Phú commune of Cái Nước district.

On February 14th 1987, the Council of Ministers issued Decision No. 33B-HĐBT on separating 950 hectares of land with 2,500 inhabitants of Ward 8 to merge into Lý Văn Lâm commune.

On November 6th 1996, the National Assembly issued a Resolution on dividing Minh Hải province into two provinces: Bạc Liêu province and Cà Mau province. At that time, Lý Văn Lâm commune belonged to Cà Mau town, Cà Mau province.

On April 14th 1999, the Government issued Decree No. 21/1999/ND-CP on the establishment of Cà Mau city in Cà Mau province. Lý Văn Lâm commune was under the jurisdiction of Cà Mau city.

On June 16th 2025, the Standing Committee of the National Assembly issued Resolution No. 1655/2025/NQ-UBTVQH15 on the rearrangement of commune-level administrative units in Cà Mau province in 2025. Accordingly, Lý Văn Lâm Ward was established on the basis of merging Ward 8, Lý Văn Lâm commune (Cà Mau city) and Giao Vàm hamlet, Tắc Thủ hamlet, and part of Cỏ Xước hamlet of Lợi An commune, Trần Văn Thời district. Natural area: 45.42 km2; population: 50,684 people.

== Organizational structure ==
Government structure of Lý Văn Lâm ward
Name	Position
Dương Minh Em	Party Committee Secretary, Chairman of the People's Council
Phan Hoàng Giang	Deputy Secretary of the Party Committee
Đặng Văn Vẹn	Deputy Secretary, Chairman of the People's Committee
Lê Thị Kim Cương	Vice Chairman of the People's Council
Đặng Văn Nam	Vice Chairman of the People's Council
Lê Quốc Dương	Vice Chairman of the People's Council
Nguyễn Văn Chuôi	Deputy Head of the Culture and Social Affairs Committee
Lê Thanh Trầm	Deputy Head of the Economic and Budget Committee
Phan Bảo Dương	Chief of the Party Committee Office
Cao Việt Anh	Head of the Party Building Department
Phạm Ngọc Thì	Chairman of the Inspection Committee
Võ Bích Thủy	Chairman of the Vietnam Fatherland Front Committee
Ngô Thị Hồng Xuân	Chief of the Office of the People's Council and People's Committee
Nguyễn Phước Phúc	Head of the Department of Economy, Infrastructure and Urban Development
Lê Minh Hải	Head of Culture and Social Affairs Department
Trần Quốc Tộc	Deputy Director of the Center for Public Administrative Welfare
Phạm Đức Toàn	Chief of Police
Đỗ Hòa Nhã	Commander of the Ward Military Command
Nguyễn Phước Hữu	Head of the Health Station
