= Tân Thuận =

Tân Thuận may refer to several places in Vietnam, including:

- Tân Thuận, Cà Mau, a rural commune of Đầm Dơi District.
- Tân Thuận, Bình Thuận, a rural commune of Hàm Thuận Nam District.
- Tân Thuận, Kiên Giang, a rural commune of Vĩnh Thuận District.
