= Hà Tĩnh (city) =

- Provincial city (Class-2)
- Hà Tĩnh City; Thành phố Hà Tĩnh
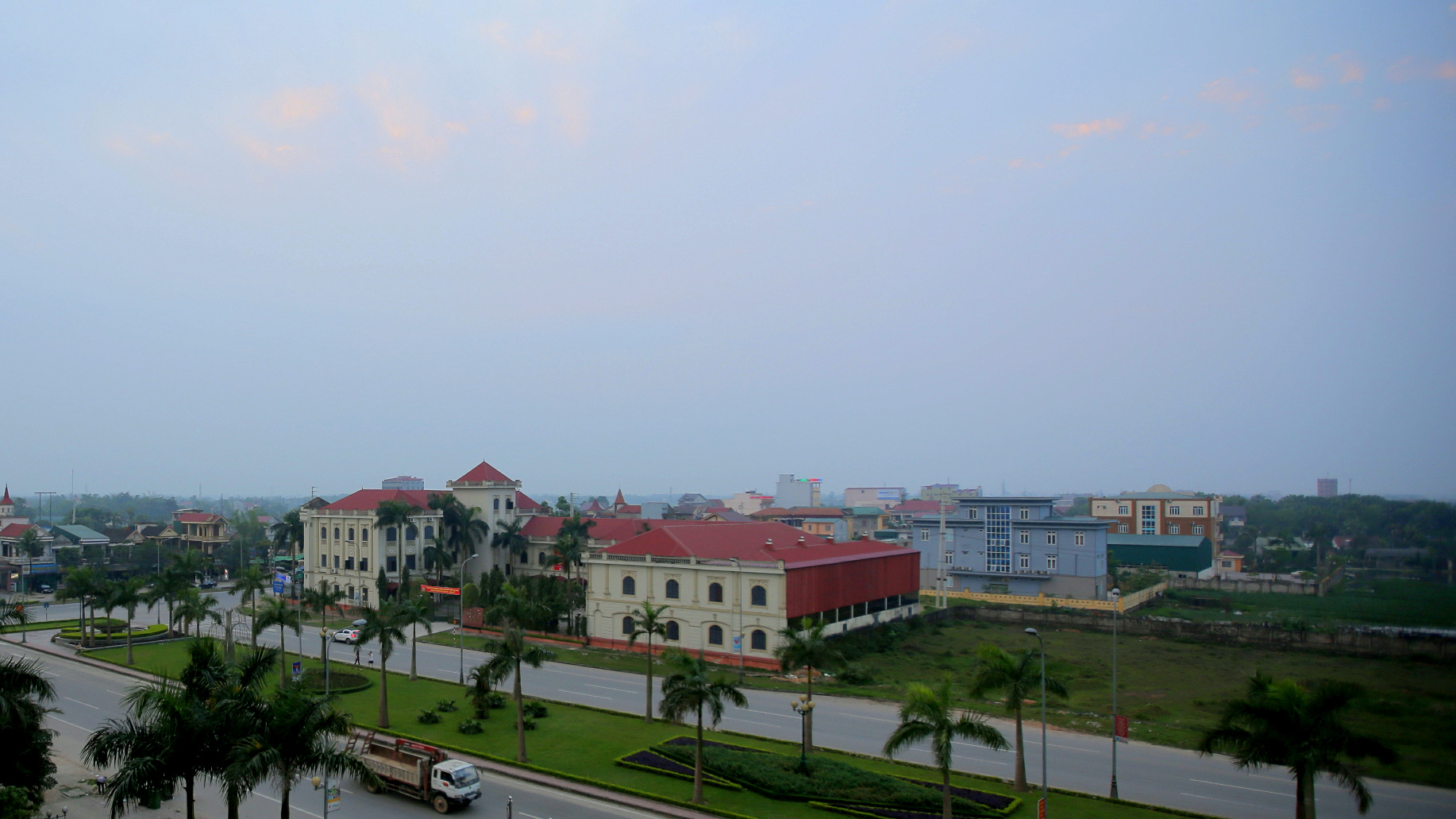
- View from the Sailing Tower building

- Seal
- Interactive map of Hà Tĩnh
- Location of Hà Tĩnh in Vietnam Hà Tĩnh (Southeast Asia) Hà Tĩnh (Asia)
- Coordinates: 18°20′N 105°54′E
- Country: Vietnam
- Province: Hà Tĩnh
- Upgraded to city: 28 May 2007

Government
  - People's Committee President: Nguyễn Văn Quý
  - People's Association President: Hà Văn Trọng
  - Secretary: Dương Tất Thắng

Area
  - Total: 230 km^{2} (89 sq mi)

Population
  - Total: 380,000
  - Density: 1,700/km^{2} (4,300/sq mi)
  - Ethnicities: 95% Kinh 5% other ethnicities
- Climate: Cfa/Am
- Website: hatinhcity.gov.vn

Hà Tĩnh (Vietnamese: [hâː tǐŋ̟ˀ]) is a city in Vietnam. It is the capital of Hà Tĩnh Province, and lies in the North Central Coast region. It is located on National Highway 1A. The Vietnamese capital Hanoi is located 340 km north of Hà Tĩnh, Vinh is located 50 km to the north, and Huế is located 314 km to the south. Hà Tĩnh is 12.5 km from the South China Sea.

== Geography ==
- North borders: Thạch Hà town (via Cày bridge), Cửa Sót river.
- West borders: Thạch Đài Commune, Cày river (Thạch Hà district).
- Southern borders: Cẩm Bình Commune, Cẩm Vịnh Commune (Cẩm Xuyên district).
- Eastern borders: Đồng Môn river (Thạch Hà district, Lộc Hà)

== Administrative divisions ==
Hà Tĩnh city consists of 16 administration units: 10 wards and 6 communes:

- Nam Hà ward
- Bắc Hà ward
- Tân Giang ward
- Trần Phú ward
- Nguyễn Du ward
- Hà Huy Tập ward
- Đại Nài ward
- Văn Yên ward
- Thạch Linh ward
- Thạch Quý ward
- Thạch Bình commune
- Thạch Trung commune
- Thạch Môn commune
- Thạch Hạ commune
- Thạch Hưng commune
- Thạch Đồng commune

== Education ==
There are many tertiary education institutions such as Hà Tĩnh University, Hà Tĩnh College of Medicine, Nguyễn Du Cultural, Sports and Tourism College, Hà Tĩnh Vocational College of Technology and Vietnam-Germany College of Vocation. Some high schools include Hà Tĩnh Senior High School, Phan Đình Phùng High School and Thành Sen (Lotus City) High School.

== Transport ==
The city doesn't have it own airport with air transport being served by the nearest airport, Vinh International Airport which is located approximately 63 km north of the nearby province of Nghệ An.

== Climate ==
Hà Tĩnh has a marginal and unusually wet tropical monsoon climate (Köppen Am) bordering on both an unusually wet humid subtropical climate (Cfa) and a trade-wind tropical rainforest climate (Af) – the last of these being a rare climate type in Vietnam. The heaviest rain is in the northeast monsoon season from September to November, when 1,616 millimetres or 63.6 inches can be expected, but rainfall exceeds 50 millimetres or 2 inches even in the driest months of the “spring” season. The weather during the “winter” season from December to February is warm, humid and somewhat rainy, whilst the “summer” from May to August is hot to sweltering although drier than most of Indochina due to the influence of the mountains to the southwest.

Climate data for Hà Tĩnh
Month	Jan	Feb	Mar	Apr	May	Jun	Jul	Aug	Sep	Oct	Nov	Dec	Year
Record high °C (°F)	34.5 (94.1)	36.2 (97.2)	39.4 (102.9)	43.2 (109.8)	41.5 (106.7)	40.3 (104.5)	40.7 (105.3)	39.7 (103.5)	38.5 (101.3)	35.2 (95.4)	35.3 (95.5)	30.4 (86.7)	43.2 (109.8)
Mean daily maximum °C (°F)	20.5 (68.9)	21.2 (70.2)	23.9 (75.0)	28.5 (83.3)	32.4 (90.3)	34.1 (93.4)	34.3 (93.7)	33.1 (91.6)	30.8 (87.4)	27.9 (82.2)	24.8 (76.6)	21.7 (71.1)	27.7 (81.9)
Daily mean °C (°F)	17.6 (63.7)	18.5 (65.3)	20.8 (69.4)	24.6 (76.3)	28.0 (82.4)	29.7 (85.5)	29.8 (85.6)	28.8 (83.8)	27.0 (80.6)	24.6 (76.3)	21.7 (71.1)	18.7 (65.7)	24.2 (75.6)
Mean daily minimum °C (°F)	15.7 (60.3)	16.8 (62.2)	18.9 (66.0)	22.9 (73.2)	24.9 (76.8)	26.5 (79.7)	26.4 (79.5)	25.8 (78.4)	24.5 (76.1)	22.3 (72.1)	19.7 (67.5)	16.7 (62.1)	21.7 (71.1)
Record low °C (°F)	5.6 (42.1)	8.0 (46.4)	8.2 (46.8)	13.3 (55.9)	17.3 (63.1)	19.5 (67.1)	22.0 (71.6)	22.3 (72.1)	17.0 (62.6)	15.1 (59.2)	11.3 (52.3)	6.8 (44.2)	5.6 (42.1)
Average rainfall mm (inches)	95.9 (3.78)	59.8 (2.35)	61.3 (2.41)	78.0 (3.07)	152.5 (6.00)	138.7 (5.46)	114.1 (4.49)	231.9 (9.13)	525.6 (20.69)	728.0 (28.66)	312.2 (12.29)	159.8 (6.29)	2,651.4 (104.39)
Average rainy days	15.0	14.9	15.0	11.2	11.0	8.5	7.8	11.6	14.8	18.0	15.6	13.9	157.5
Average relative humidity (%)	89.9	91.3	90.4	87.0	80.5	74.8	73.4	79.3	85.1	87.3	87.4	87.3	84.4
Mean monthly sunshine hours	70.7	53.0	73.1	135.8	219.3	210.8	226.5	191.8	156.5	129.5	94.4	73.5	1,629.6
Source: Vietnam Institute for Building Science and Technology

== Gallery ==
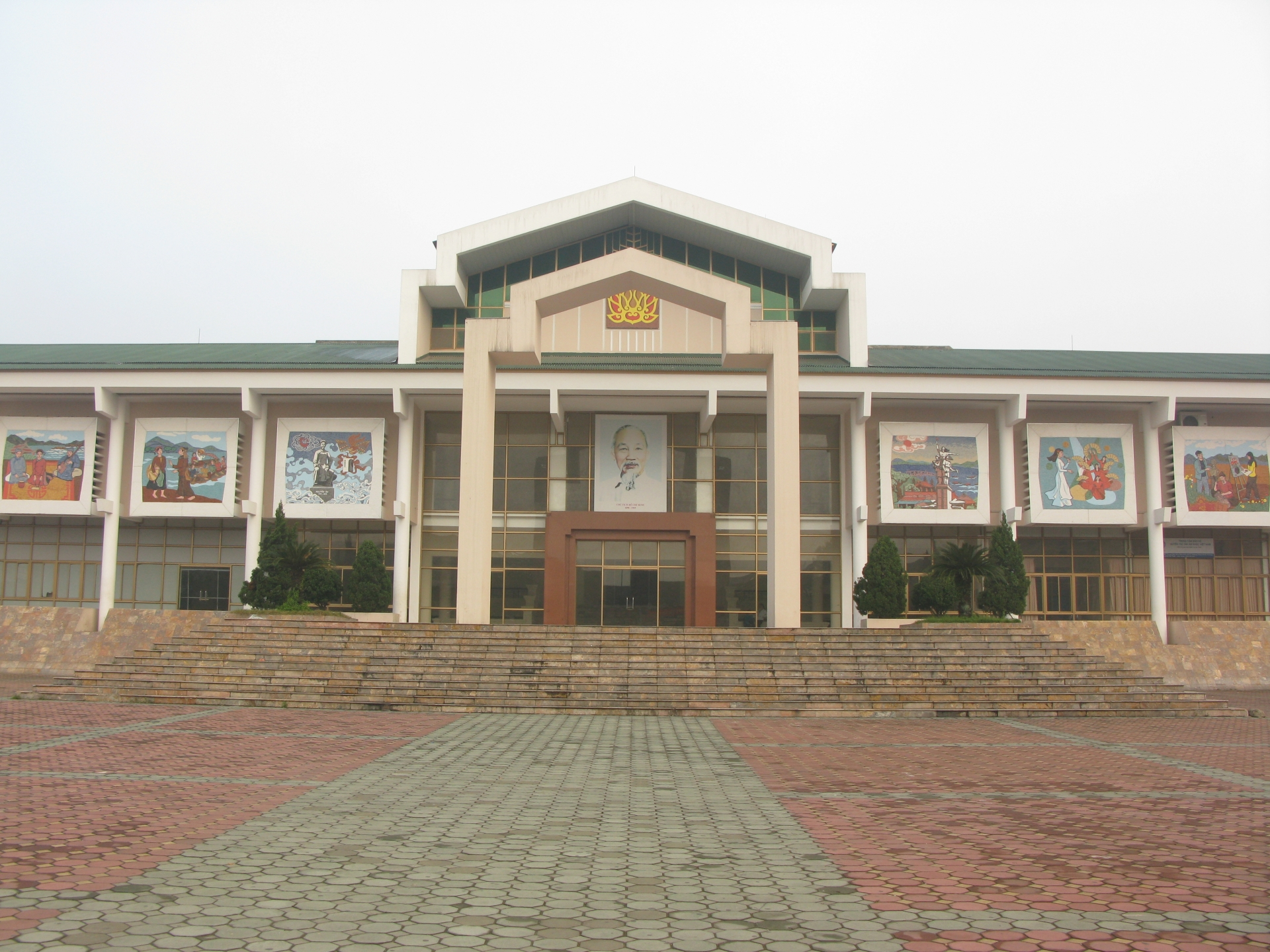
City Cultural Center

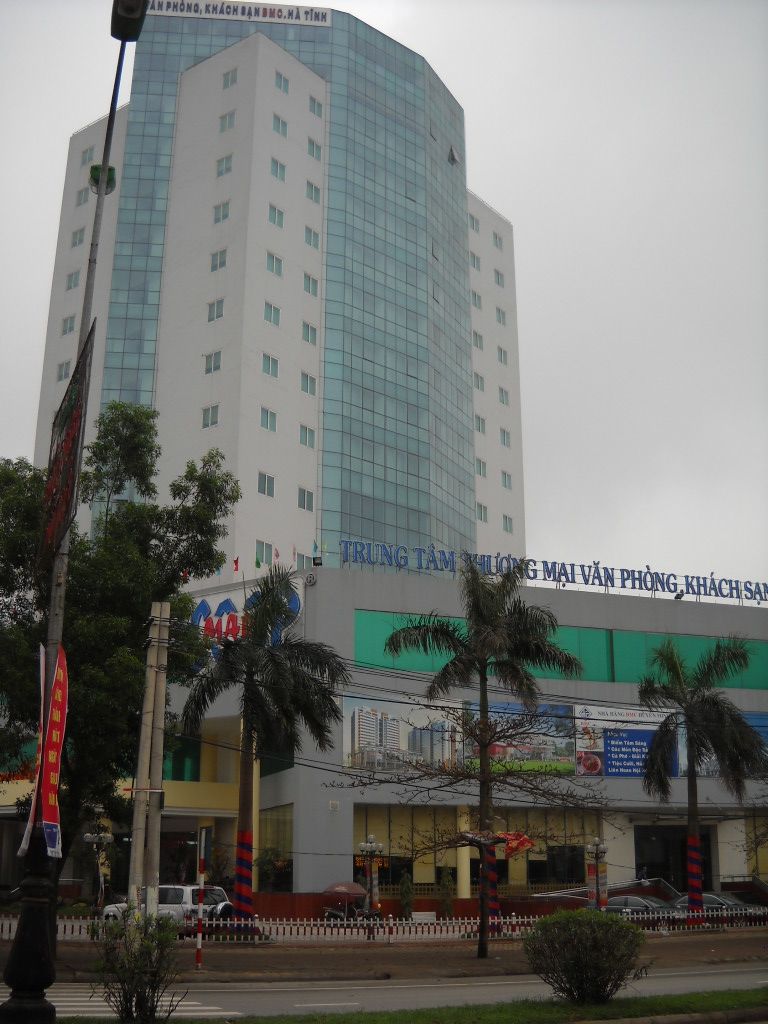
Hà Tĩnh commercial center

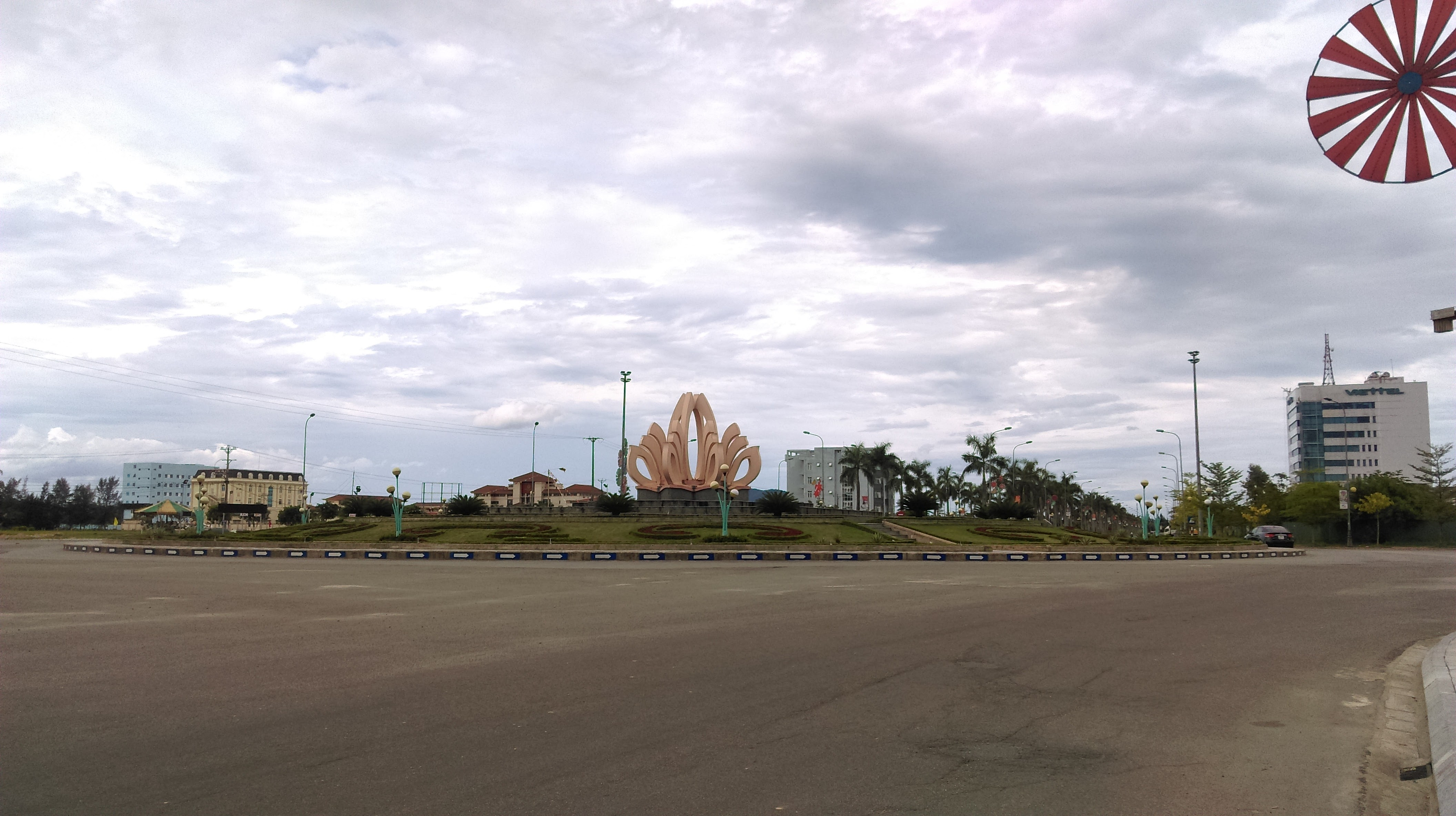
Trần Phú Park

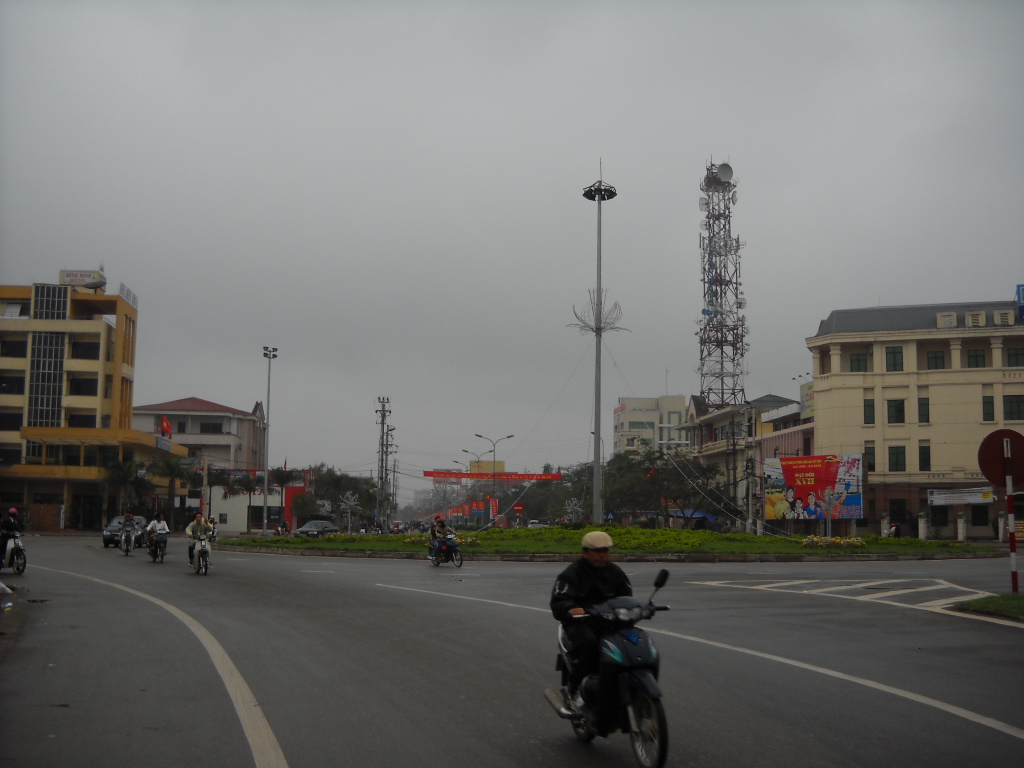
A corner of Hà Tĩnh City

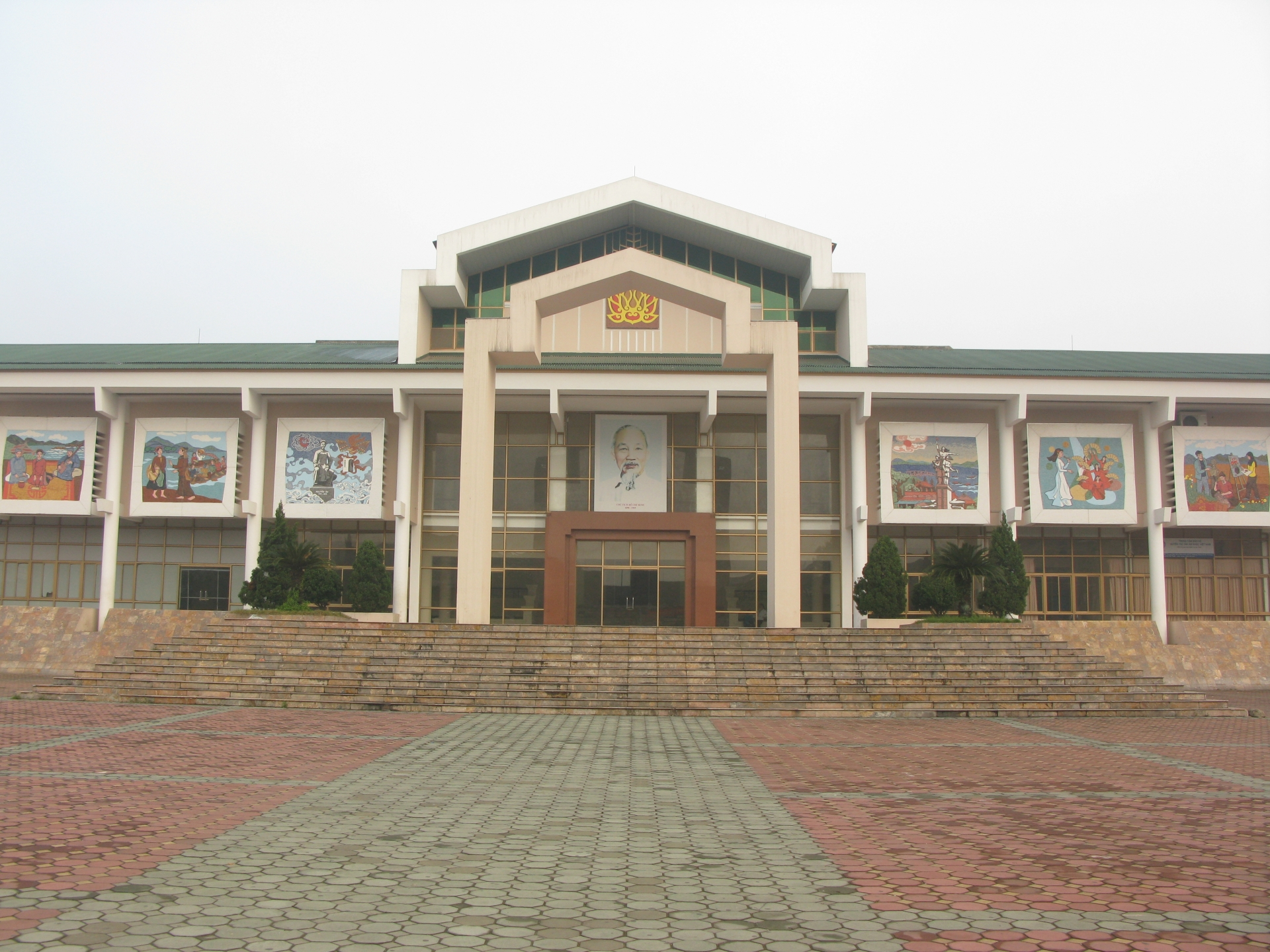
City cultural house

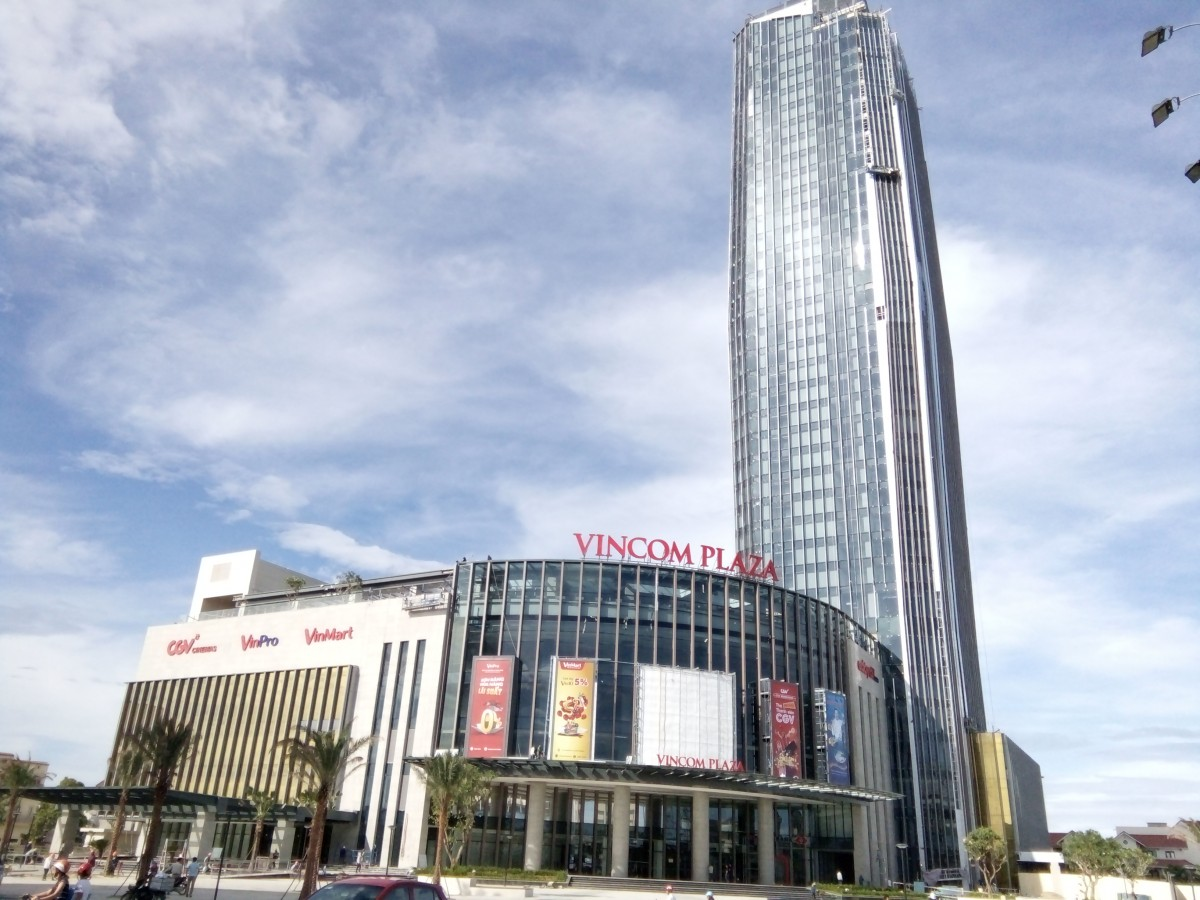
Vincom Plaza, Hà Tĩnh city

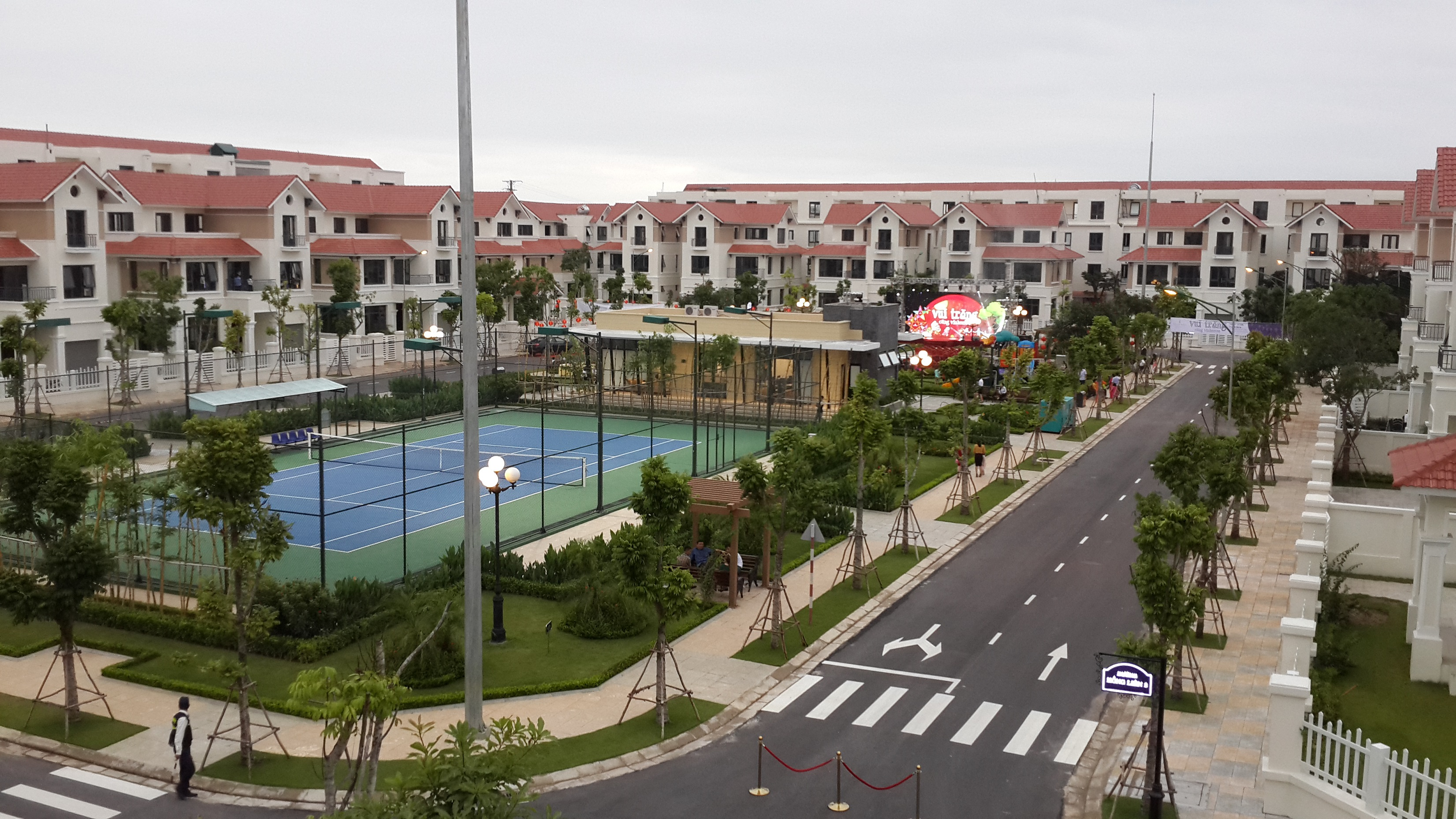
Vinhomes Hà Tĩnh area

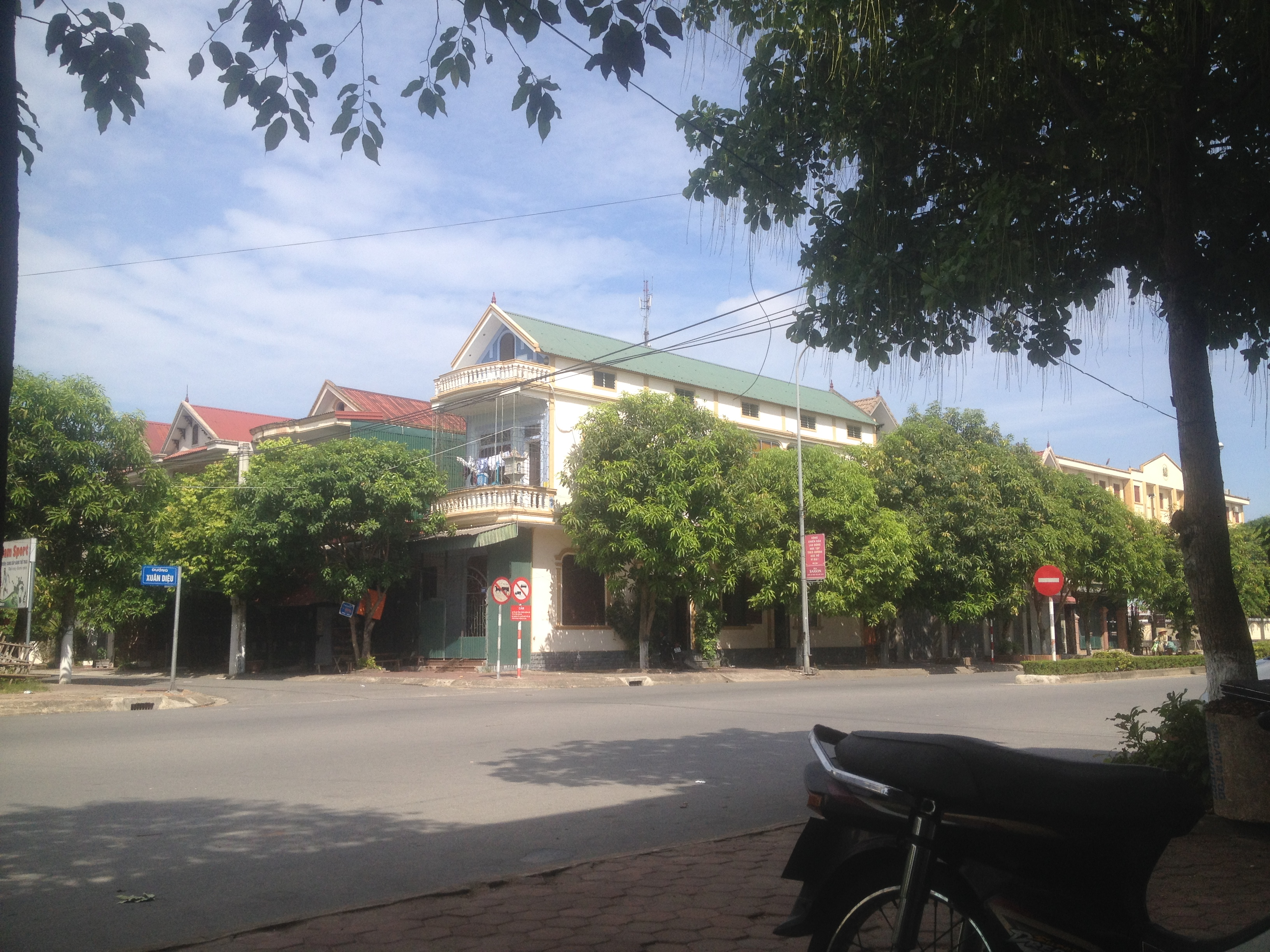
Xuân Diệu - Nguyễn Du intersection, Hà Tĩnh city

== See also ==
- Formosa Ha Tinh Steel
