= Tân Đức =

Tân Đức may refer to several places in Vietnam, including:

- Tân Đức, Cà Mau, a rural commune of Đầm Dơi District.
- Tân Đức, Bình Thuận, a rural commune of Hàm Tân District.
- Tân Đức, Thái Nguyên, a rural commune of Phú Bình District.
