= Tân Hải =

Tân Hải may refer to several places in Vietnam:

- Tân Hải, Bình Thuận, a commune of La Gi
- Tân Hải, Bà Rịa-Vũng Tàu, a commune of Phú Mỹ
- Tân Hải, Ninh Thuận, a commune of Ninh Hải District
- Tân Hải, Cà Mau, a commune of Phú Tân District, Cà Mau Province
