= Nguyễn Sỹ Nam =

Vietnamese footballer

Personal information
- Full name: Nguyễn Sỹ Nam
- Date of birth: 7 March 1993 (age 33)
- Place of birth: Anh Sơn, Nghệ An, Vietnam
- Height: 1.70 m (5 ft 7 in)
- Position: Left-back

Team information
- Current team: Quy Nhơn Bình Định
- Number: 20

Youth career
- 2005–2013: Sông Lam Nghệ An

Senior career*
Years	Team	Apps	(Gls)
2014–2015	XSKT Cần Thơ	11	(0)
2016–2021	Sông Lam Nghệ An	45	(1)
2022	Hồng Lĩnh Hà Tĩnh	9	(0)
2023–2024	Đông Á Thanh Hóa	18	(0)
2024–	Quy Nhơn Bình Định	3	(0)
- * Club domestic league appearances and goals as of 4 October 2024

Nguyễn Sỹ Nam (born 7 March 1993) is a Vietnamese professional footballer who plays as a left-back for V.League 2 club Quy Nhơn Bình Định.

== Honours ==
Thanh Hóa

- Vietnamese Cup: 2023, 2023–24
- Vietnamese Super Cup: 2023
