= 2018 Northern Vietnam floods =

Natural disaster in Vietnam

2018 Vietnam floods
- Date: 23–25 June
- Cause: Floods

On 23 June, floods started across the northern provinces of Vietnam. The flood waters have receded from the northern mountainous provinces of Lai Chau, Ha Giang and Lao Cai while several towns and villages were inaccessible. 23 people were confirmed dead in the floods: in Lai Chau 16 were killed, 5 in Ha Giang Province while two others in other provinces. An estimated VND530 billion ($23.2 million) of damage was recorded in Lao Cai, Ha Giang and Lai Chau and over 80 houses had been destroyed and over 700 hectares of rice fields damaged.

== Other floods ==
On 21 July, floods triggered by heavy rains hit the northern part of the country after Tropical Storm Son-Tinh made landfall in northern coastal areas, killing 27 people and wounding 14, while 7 others were declared missing. Also, 17,000 animals were killed, 82,000 hectares of crops were damaged and 5,000 houses were destroyed.

On 1 August, two children and a man drowned as new floods has overflowed one bank of the Bui River, engulfed several villages and threaten to submerge parts of Hanoi. On 3 August, floods triggered landslides that killed six people, injuring two and leaving five others missing.

On 2 September, floods started again across the country. As of 4 September, at least 14 people were confirmed dead while four others are declared missing. Also, 375 houses were damaged and 661 cattle killed.
