= Tropical Storm Kaemi (2000) =

West Pacific tropical storm in 2000

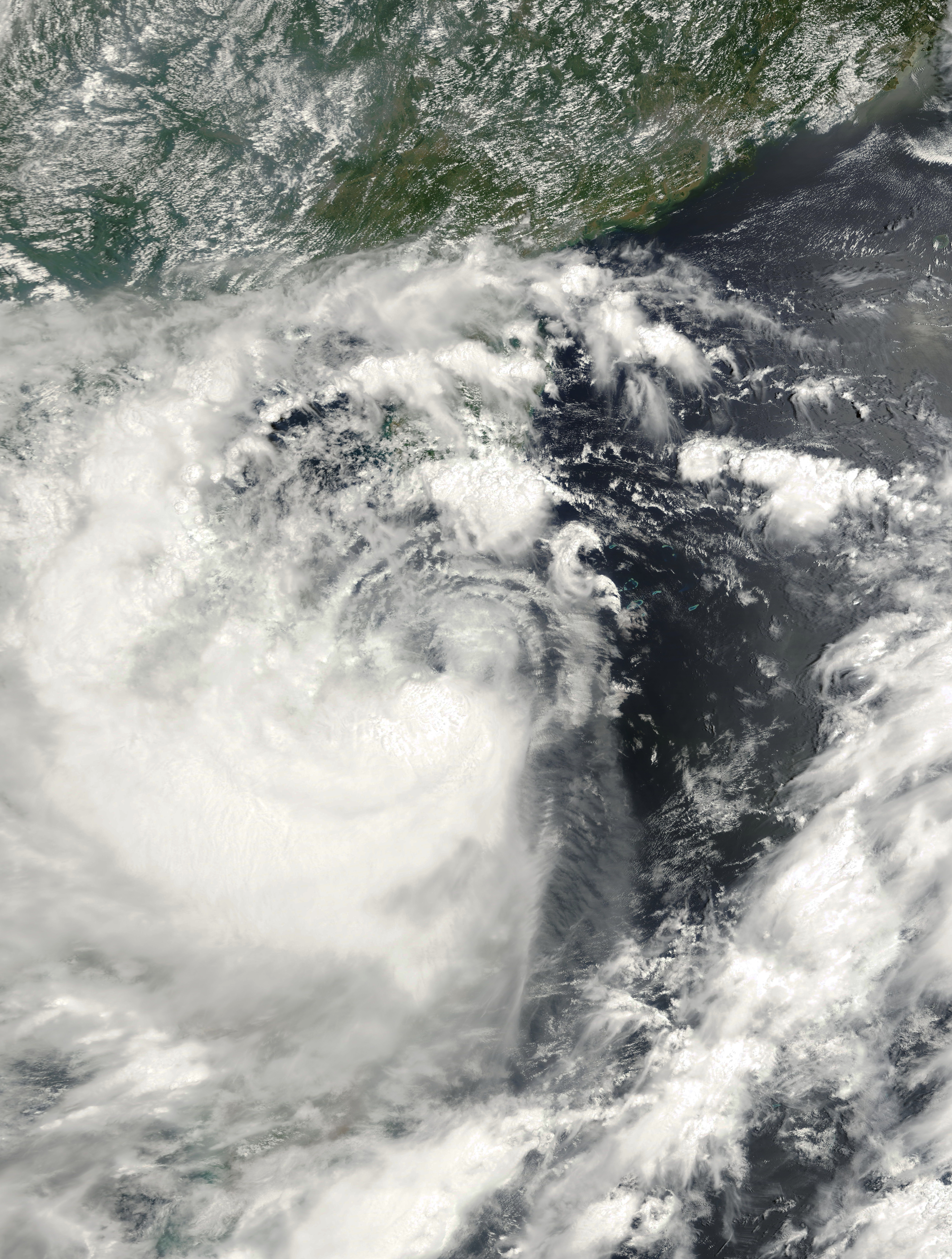
- Kaemi at peak intensity on August 22

Meteorological history
- Formed: August 19, 2000
- Dissipated: August 24, 2000

Tropical storm
- 10-minute sustained (JMA)
- Highest winds: 75 km/h (45 mph)
- Lowest pressure: 985 hPa (mbar); 29.09 inHg

Tropical storm
- 1-minute sustained (SSHWS/JTWC)
- Highest winds: 85 km/h (50 mph)

Overall effects
- Fatalities: >141 (Note: 26 direct (17 in Vietnam and 9 in Thailand) and 115 indirect (all in Thailand))
- Damage: $21.6 million (2000 USD)
- Areas affected: Vietnam, Thailand (Note: These are the areas reliable sources stated Kaemi hit, however, impacts were likely felt in Laos and Cambodia)
- Part of the 2000 Pacific typhoon season

Tropical Storm Kaemi (Note: The name Kaemi (Korean: 개미, [ˈkɛ(ː)mi]) was contributed by South Korea and means ant in Korean.) was a weak tropical storm which affected Vietnam and Thailand during late August 2000. The nineteenth depression and eleventh tropical storm of the 2000 Pacific typhoon season, Kaemi originated from an area of convection offshore Vietnam. Somewhat favorable environmental conditions allowed the low-pressure area to strengthen, becoming a tropical depression on August 19. Further development occurred, and on August 21, the system peaked as a minimal tropical storm, being named Kaemi. Retaining its intensity, Kaemi made landfall over Da Nang, Vietnam that same day, weakening rapidly soon after. Becoming a tropical depression on August 23, Kaemi dissipated over Thailand on August 24.

The passage of Kaemi in Vietnam brought heavy rainfall, with Da Nang receiving over 100 mm (3.9 in) of rainfall, significantly above their monthly averages. Five people drowned when sightseeing boats capsized in Hạ Long Bay, while several others died due to a collapsed home and floodwaters in Quảng Ngãi. In total, Kaemi resulted in seventeen fatalities and $7.14 million in damages in Vietnam. The storm's remnants also caused severe flooding in northeastern Thailand, particularly in Ubon Ratchathani and Sisaket provinces. Flooding associated with the storm also caused damages elsewhere in Thailand, resulting in a total of nine direct deaths and $14.4 million in damages.

== Meteorological history ==
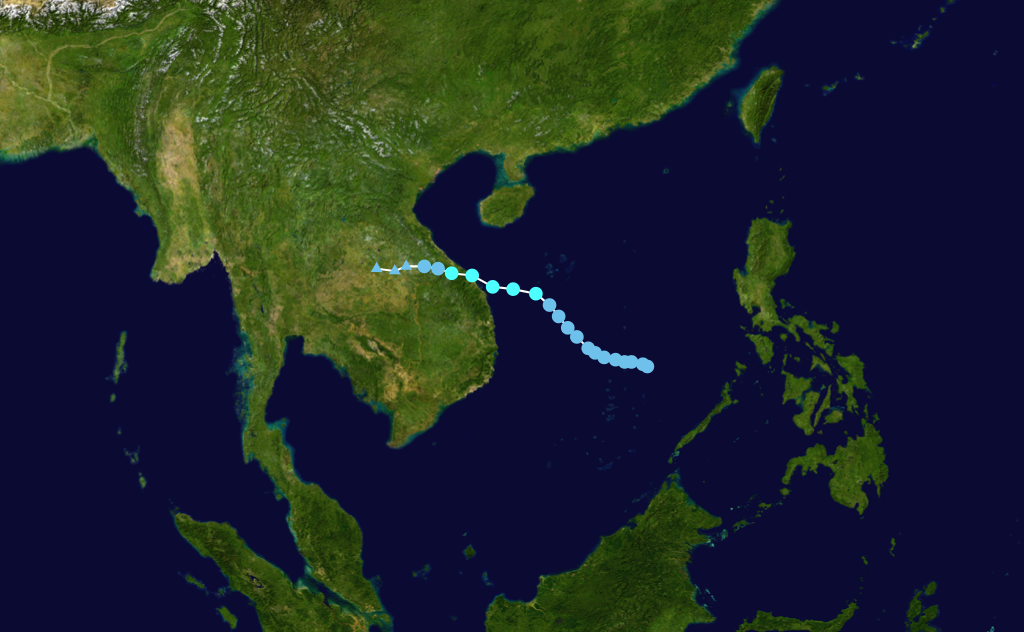
Map plotting the storm's track and intensity, according to the Saffir–Simpson scale Map key Saffir–Simpson scale Tropical depression (≤38 mph, ≤62 km/h) Tropical storm (39–73 mph, 63–118 km/h) Category 1 (74–95 mph, 119–153 km/h) Category 2 (96–110 mph, 154–177 km/h) Category 3 (111–129 mph, 178–208 km/h) Category 4 (130–156 mph, 209–251 km/h) Category 5 (≥157 mph, ≥252 km/h) Unknown Storm type Tropical cyclone Subtropical cyclone Extratropical cyclone, remnant low, tropical disturbance, or monsoon depression

On August 17, an area of convection formed offshore the southeastern coast of Vietnam in association with the monsoon trough, which at the time, extended from Vietnam into the Philippine Sea. This area of convection was monitored by the Joint Typhoon Warning Center, who first tracked the disturbance on 00:00 UTC that day. Despite initially lacking a low-level circulation and being under moderate to strong vertical wind shear, a QuikSCAT pass alongside synoptic data on August 18 revealed that the disturbance had a weak and elongated circulation. Despite exhibiting characteristics of a monsoon depression, on 00:00 UTC the next day, the Joint Typhoon Warning Center issued a Tropical Cyclone Formation Alert on the disturbance due to its convective organization and pressure drops. As a result, 12 hours later, the Japan Meteorological Agency (Note: The Regional Specialized Meteorological Centre for the Western Pacific since 2000) upgraded the disturbance into a depression.

Further convective organization occurred on August 20, prompting the Joint Typhoon Warning Center to issue their first warning on Tropical Depression 19W at 06:00 UTC that day. Despite that, the depression was still under moderate vertical shear, with outflow only extending west and northeast of the system. Guided by a subtropical ridge to the north, the depression tracked northwestward, later moving more west-northwestward as it approached the coast of Vietnam. Further intensification occurred, with deep convection becoming more persistent alongside a spiral band developing west of the circulation. As a result of this, on 12:00 UTC on August 21, both the Joint Typhoon Warning Center and Japan Meteorological Agency upgraded the depression into a tropical storm, with the latter agency naming it Kaemi.

Peaking with 10-minute sustained winds of 45 mph (75 km/h) at that time, satellite imagery a few hours later revealed that Kaemi peaked with 1-minute sustained winds of 50 mph (85 km/h). Moderate wind shear and its proximity to land prevented Kaemi from intensifying further, and when it made landfall near Da Nang, Vietnam on 06:00 UTC on August 22, Kaemi's center was partially-exposed and sheared. Rapidly weakening once inland, the Joint Typhoon Warning Center issued their final warning on Kaemi at 00:00 UTC the next day, just north of the Bolaven Plateau in Laos. The JMA kept tracking Kaemi as a depression until it dissipated on 00:00 UTC on August 24.

== Preparations and impacts ==
The passage of Kaemi in Vietnam brought heavy rains to the nation, with Da Nang reporting 140 mm (5.5 in) and Huế reporting 88 mm (3.5 in) of rainfall from the nation, more than half the monthly rainfall averages for both cities. Five people (Note: Two Indian tourists, one Thai tourist, and two crew members) drowned when their sight-seeing boats capsized in Hạ Long Bay due to a whirlwind. Quảng Ngãi province, one person was killed when their home collapsed, with another two dying when they were washed away by floodwaters. Elsewhere, in Thừa Thiên Huế province, a person was killed when they were struck by lightning while another was reported missing due to flooding. In the city of Da Nang, a man was electrocuted by a fallen utility pole. In total, Kaemi killed seventeen people, injured an additional four and caused US$7.14 million damage in Vietnam.

Elsewhere, the remnants of Kaemi caused flash floods in northeastern Thailand. Ubon Ratchathani and Sisaket provinces were the worst affected, while flooding associated with the storm also caused damages in other regions, affecting 24 of Thailand's 76 provinces. In total, the storm affected 304,273 households and caused 9 direct deaths in Thailand. Outbreaks of leptospirosis resulted in 3,240 reported patients, with 115 additional deaths from the disease. A total of 1.9 million rai (3,000 km^{2}; 1,200 sq mi) of cultivated land was damaged, with total damages preliminarily reported at 605,113,012 baht ($14.41 million).

In the northeastern Surin province, two people drowned, while in the eastern Trat province, two others died. In the southern region, over six thousand people in Phang Nga province were affected by the floods, which peaked with 200 cm (79 in) of rain recorded in some places and flooded many fruit and rubber plantations. Additionally, landslides blocked roads in some places, with one in Thai Mueang district producing debris which blocked all roads in and out of a village. In Phuket province, a man drowned as he was swept away by water which was flooding a bridge on a canal.
