= Tropical Storm Ruth (1980) =

Western Pacific tropical storm

Severe Tropical Storm Ruth
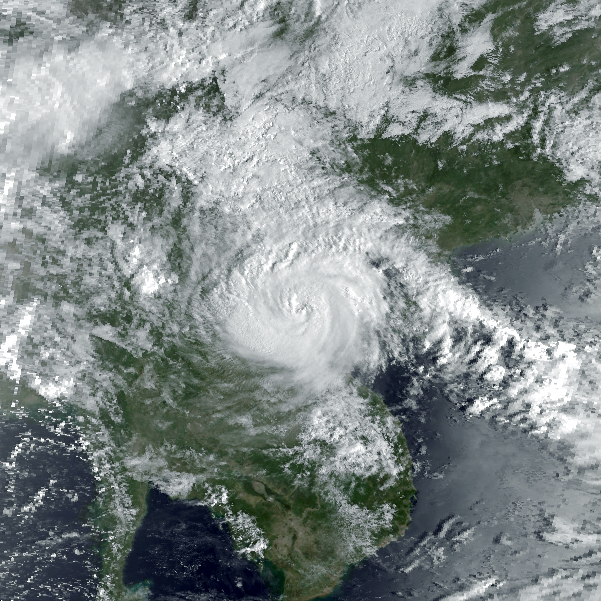
- Ruth near peak intensity on September 16

Meteorological history
- Formed: September 12, 1980
- Dissipated: September 17, 1980

Severe tropical storm
- 10-minute sustained (JMA)
- Highest winds: 100 km/h (65 mph)
- Lowest pressure: 980 hPa (mbar); 28.94 inHg

Category 1-equivalent typhoon
- 1-minute sustained (SSHWS/JTWC)
- Highest winds: 120 km/h (75 mph)

Overall effects
- Fatalities: 164 total
- Injuries: 97
- Areas affected: China (primarily Hong Kong and Hainan), Vietnam, Laos, Thailand, Myanmar
- Part of the 1980 Pacific typhoon season

Severe Tropical Storm Ruth was a weak but destructive tropical storm which struck Vietnam during September 1980. Originating from a monsoon depression in the South China Sea, as it tracked westward, it intensified into a tropical depression on 12 September. Initially peaking with 10-minute sustained winds of 50 mph (85 km/h), after it made landfallin Hainan, China on 15 September, it weakened into a minimal tropical storm. Despite that, the warm waters of the Gulf of Tonkin allowed Ruth to re-intensify, peaking as a high-end tropical storm according to the Japan Meteorological Agency (JMA) and a minimal typhoon according to the Joint Typhoon Warning Center (JTWC). Soon after, it made its second landfall in Thanh Hóa province, Vietnam. Rapidly weakening once inland, it dissipated over Bilauktaung Range on 18 September.

The worst cyclone to strike Thanh Hóa province in 30 years, Ruth caused almost 500,000 people to be homeless. It caused significant damage in Vietnam, causing severe crop damage in the region and killing 164 people.

== Meteorological history ==
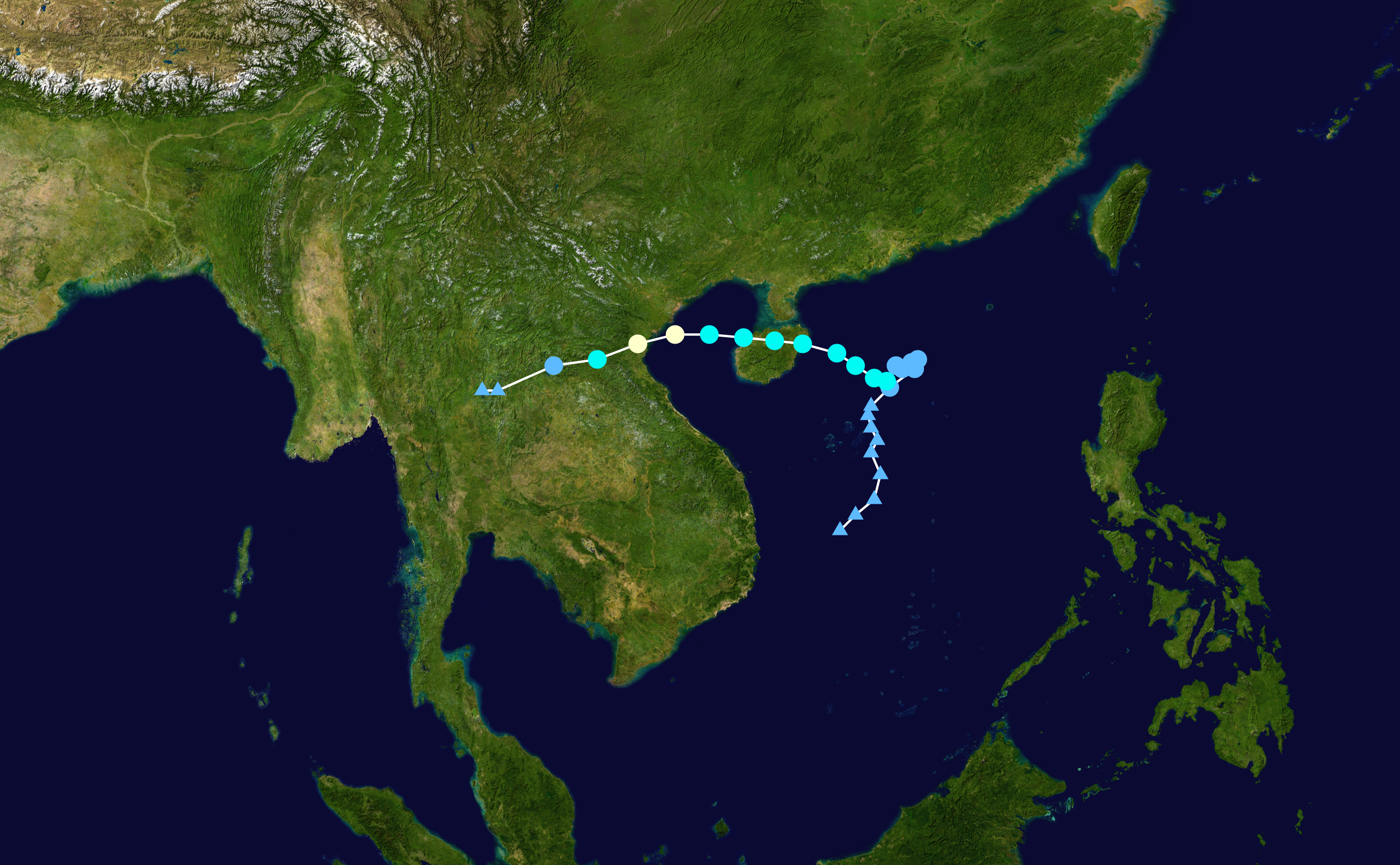
Map plotting the storm's track and intensity, according to the Saffir–Simpson scale Map key Saffir–Simpson scale Tropical depression (≤38 mph, ≤62 km/h) Tropical storm (39–73 mph, 63–118 km/h) Category 1 (74–95 mph, 119–153 km/h) Category 2 (96–110 mph, 154–177 km/h) Category 3 (111–129 mph, 178–208 km/h) Category 4 (130–156 mph, 209–251 km/h) Category 5 (≥157 mph, ≥252 km/h) Unknown Storm type Tropical cyclone Subtropical cyclone Extratropical cyclone, remnant low, tropical disturbance, or monsoon depression

On 11 September, a monsoon depression in the South China Sea which was embedded in the monsoon trough started developing. As it tracked quasi-stationary for the next two days, early on 12 September, the Japan Meteorological Agency (JMA) designated the system as a tropical depression. Soon after, sypnotic data revealed that the system's circulation was developing, causing the Joint Typhoon Warning Center (JTWC) to follow the JMA in upgrading it into a depression early the next day. Later that day, the JTWC noted that the tropical depression had intensified into a tropical storm, naming it Ruth, with JMA following suit by upgrading Ruth early the next day. Accelerating northwestward, a few hours later, Ruth made landfall in Hainan Island, 40 nautical miles (74 km) southeast of Haikou, with 1-minute sustained winds of 50 mph (85 km/h).

Weakening, as Ruth entered the Gulf of Tonkin early on 15 September, landfall had taken its toll on the system, causing it to weaken a minimal tropical storm. Despite that, the Gulf of Tonkin, which at the time, was as hot as 29 °C (84 °F), was a conducive environment for the weak cyclone to cross into, resulting in Ruth significantly intensifying. As a result, according to the JTWC, Ruth underwent rapid intensification, peaking as a minimal typhoon with 1-minute sustained winds of 75 mph (120 km/h). The JMA, however, stated that Ruth had actually peaked with 10-minute sustained winds of 65 mph (100 km/h) at that time. Just a few hours later, early on 16 September, Ruth made landfall south of Thanh Hóa, Vietnam at peak intensity. Rapidly weakening once inland, a few hours later, the JTWC stopped tracking Ruth, claiming it had dissipated. However, the JMA kept tracking a weakening Ruth until September 17. The remnants of Ruth later dissipated in Bilauktaung Range early the next day.

== Preparations and impact ==
=== Hong Kong ===
In the evening of 12 September, the Hong Kong Observatory (HKO) hoisted a No. 1 Standby Signal as Ruth was around 210 nautical miles (390 km). The next day, this was upgraded into a No. 3 Strong Wind Signal the next day. However, late on 15 September, all signals were lowered. Ruth primarily caused light showers and intense gusts in the island.

=== Vietnam ===
In Vietnam, nearly half a million people were left homeless. The worst typhoon to strike Thanh Hoa province in 30 years, a 2022 report from GeoHazards stated that from 1970 to 2018, Ruth was the tropical cyclone which caused the most crop damage in the area. Tens of thousands of buildings were inundated, and a total of 164 people died due to Ruth. 97 people suffered injuries.

=== Elsewhere ===
As a weakening Ruth tracked into Eastern Thailand and Laos, primarily beneficial rainfall amounting to 100 mm (3.9 in) was seen in some places.

== Aftermath ==
In the aftermath of Ruth, the Soviet Union bought around $50 million worth of wheat from Australia and Greece to serve as emergency aid for the Vietnamese government. Despite barring any aid to be sent to Vietnam due to the ongoing Cambodian–Vietnamese War, Australian authorities approved of this deal.
