= Hưng Mỹ, Cà Mau =

Coordinates: 8°54′N 104°59′E

Hưng Mỹ
- Commune and village
- Interactive map of Hưng Mỹ
- Country: Vietnam
- Province: Cà Mau
- District: Cái Nước
- Time zone: UTC+07:00

Hưng Mỹ is a commune (xã) and village of Cà Mau province, Vietnam.
