= Nguyễn Việt Khái =

- Commune and village
- Country: Vietnam
- Province: Cà Mau
- Time zone: UTC+07:00

Nguyễn Việt Khái is a commune (xã) and village in Cà Mau province, in Vietnam.

The Standing Committee of the National Assembly issued Resolution No. 1655/NQ-UBTVQH15 on the rearrangement of commune-level administrative units of Cà Mau Province in 2025 (the resolution takes effect from 16 June 2025). Accordingly, Nguyễn Việt Khái Commune was established in Cà Mau Province on the basis of the entire natural area of 42.30 km² and a population of 14,666 people of Tân Hưng Tây Commune; the entire natural area of 48.10 km² and a population of 11,459 people of Rạch Chèo Commune; and the entire natural area of 39.50 km² and a population of 11,182 people of Việt Thắng Commune, all belonging to Phú Tân District.
