= Cái Nước =

- Ward
- Location in Vietnam
- Coordinates: 9°48′N 105°6′E
- Country: Vietnam
- Province: Cà Mau
- Time zone: UTC+07:00

Cái Nước is a ward (phường) of Cà Mau province, in Vietnam.

The Standing Committee of the National Assembly issued Resolution No. 1655/NQ-UBTVQH15 on the rearrangement of commune-level administrative units of Cà Mau Province in 2025 (the resolution takes effect from 16 June 2025). Accordingly, Cái Nước Commune was established in Cà Mau Province on the basis of the entire natural area of 25.50 km² and a population of 19,048 people of Cái Nước Townlship; the entire natural area of 42.20 km² and a population of 15,717 people of Trần Thới Commune; the adjustment of 25.55 km² in natural area with a population of 9,958 people from Đông Thới Commune; and the adjustment of 20.30 km² in natural area with a population of 7,682 people from Tân Hưng Đông Commune, all belonging to Cái Nước District.
