= Hà Huy Tập, Hà Tĩnh =

Hà Huy Tập
- Ward
- Country: Vietnam
- Province: Hà Tĩnh

Area
  - Total: 12.59 sq mi (32.62 km^{2})

Population (2025)
  - Total: 28,742
  - Density: 2,282/sq mi (881.1/km^{2})
- Time zone: UTC+07:00 (Indochina Time)
- Administrative: 18652

Hà Huy Tập is a ward (phường) of Hà Tĩnh Province, Vietnam.

The total area of Hà Huy Tập ward is 12.59 square miles
