= Cái Nước district =

Coordinates: 9.000°N 105.000°E

Cái Nước district Huyện Cái Nước
- District
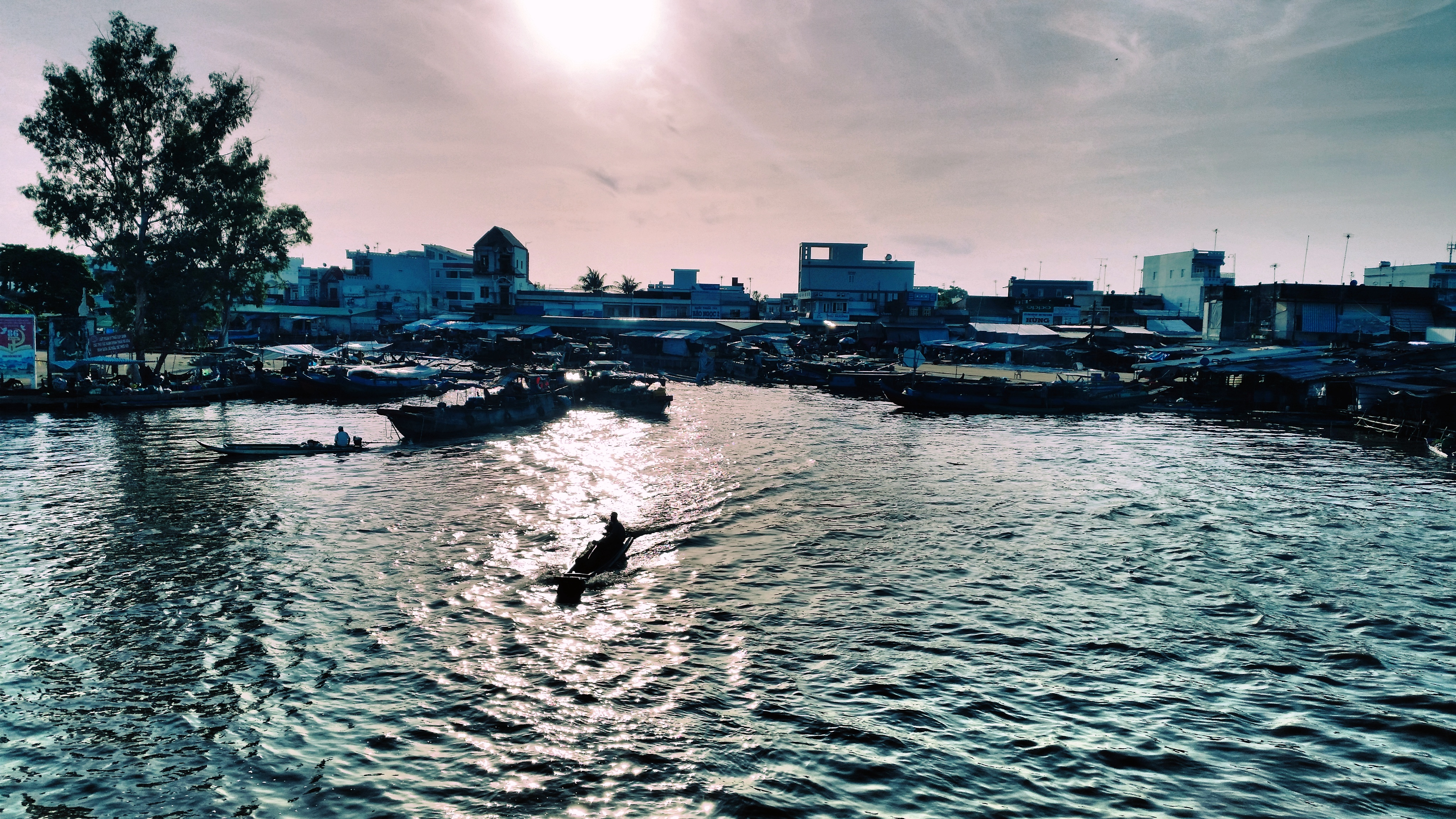
- Cái Nước market

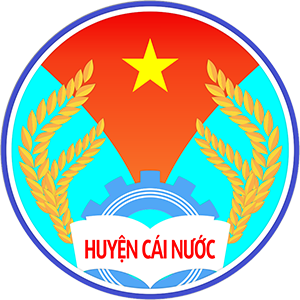
- Seal

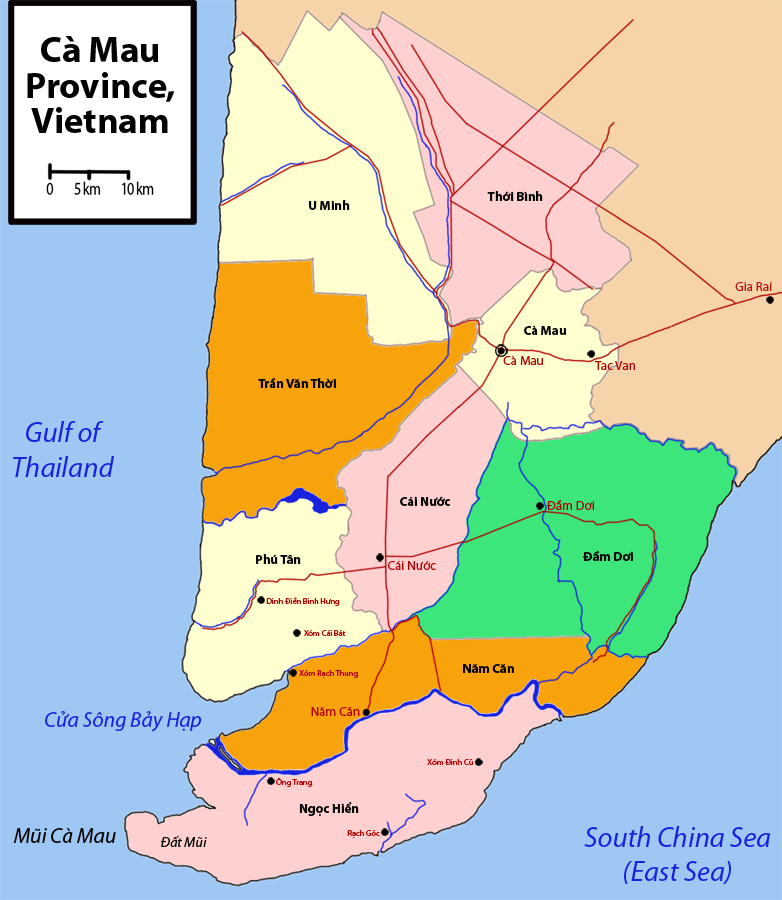
- Districts of Cà Mau province
- Country: Vietnam
- Province: Cà Mau
- Capital: Cái Nước

Area
  - District: 395.14 km^{2} (152.56 sq mi)

Population (2019 census)
  - District: 136,638
  - Density: 345.80/km^{2} (895.61/sq mi)
  - Urban: 14,482
  - Rural: 122,156
- Time zone: UTC+07:00 (Indochina Time)

Cái Nước is a former rural district of Cà Mau province in the Mekong Delta region of Vietnam. As of 2019 the district had a population of 136,638. The district capital lies at Cái Nước.

The district was abolished in 2025 after the Plan to arrange and merge administrative units in Vietnam, and was replaced by 4 communes: Luong The Tran, Tan Hung, Cai Nuoc and Hung My.

Cái Nước is bordered by Đầm Dơi district to the east, Năm Căn district to the south, Cà Mau City to the north, Trần Văn Thời district to the northwest and Phú Tân district to the west.

Cái Nước has gardens famous for their birdlife. Like other areas on the Cà Mau peninsula, the terrain is that of a floodplain, and as such, the main industry is marine-based. The dominant industry in the area is prawn and blue crab farming.

The district was split in 2004 to form a new district of Cà Mau province. It previously covered an area of 670 km^{2} (260 sq mi) but today covers 395.14 km^{2} (152.56 sq mi).

On May 17, 1984, when it was still part of Minh Hải province, Cái Nước comprised the Phú Tân township and 32 communes: Bình Mỹ, Cái Nước (district capital), Đông Thới, Hiệp Hưng, Hòa Mỹ, Hưng Mỹ, Lương Thế Trân, Nguyễn, Phong Hưng, Phú Hiệp, Phú Hòa, Phú Hưng, Phú Lộc, Phú Mỹ, Phú Thành, Phú Thuận, Tân Hải, Tân Hiệp, Tân Hưng Đông, Tân Hưng Tây, Tân Hưng, Tân Nghiệp, Tân Phong, Tân Thới, Thạnh Phú, Thạnh Hưng, Thạnh Trung, Trần Thới, Việt Cường, Việt Dũng, Việt Hùng, Việt Khái, Việt Thắng.

== Divisions ==
Map of Cái Nước district.

The district includes 10 commune-level subdivisions, including the township of Cái Nước and the rural communes of Trần Thới, Tân Hưng, Tân Hưng Đông, Hưng Mỹ, Phú Hưng, Lương Thế Trân, Hoà Mỹ, Đông Thới, Thạnh Phú and Đông Hưng.
