= Anh Sơn, Nghệ An =

Anh Sơn Xã Anh Sơn
- Commune
- Anh Sơn commune
- Location within Vietnam
- Coordinates: 18°55′53″N 105°05′09″E
- Country: Vietnam
- Region: North Central Coast
- Province: Nghệ An
- Time zone: UTC+7 (UTC + 7)

Anh Sơn is a commune (xã) of Nghệ An Province, Vietnam.
