= Phú Tân, Cà Mau =

Coordinates: 13°17′N 109°16′E

Phú Tân
- Commune and village
- Interactive map of Phú Tân
- Country: Vietnam
- Province: Cà Mau
- Time zone: UTC+07:00

Phú Tân is a commune (xã) and village in Cà Mau province, in Vietnam.

The Standing Committee of the National Assembly issued Resolution No. 1655/NQ-UBTVQH15 on the rearrangement of commune-level administrative units of Cà Mau Province in 2025 (the resolution takes effect from 16 June 2025). Accordingly, Phú Tân Commune was established in Cà Mau Province on the basis of the entire natural area of 44.20 km^{2} and a population of 13,071 people of Tân Hải Commune, and the entire natural area of 57.50 km^{2} and a population of 20,310 people of Phú Tân Commune, both belonging to Phú Tân District.
