= Phú Mỹ, Cà Mau =

Phú Mỹ
- Commune and village
- Interactive map of Phú Mỹ
- Coordinates: 8°57′30″N 104°55′10″E
- Country: Vietnam
- Province: Cà Mau
- Time zone: UTC+07:00

Phú Mỹ is a commune (xã) and village in Cà Mau province, in Vietnam.

The Standing Committee of the National Assembly issued Resolution No. 1655/NQ-UBTVQH15 on the rearrangement of commune-level administrative units of Cà Mau Province in 2025 (the resolution takes effect from 16 June 2025). Accordingly, Phú Mỹ Commune was established in Cà Mau Province through the merger of the entire natural area of 43.20 km² with a population of 13,845 people of Phú Thuận Commune; the entire natural area of 44.6 km² with a population of 12,311 people of Phú Mỹ Commune, both belonging to Phú Tân District; and the adjustment of 0.007 km² in natural area with a population of 49 people from Hòa Mỹ Commune, Cái Nước District.
