= Tân Hưng, Cà Mau =

Tân Hưng
- Commune and village
- Interactive map of Tân Hưng
- Coordinates: 9°00′45″N 105°04′45″E
- Country: Vietnam
- Province: Cà Mau
- Time zone: UTC+07:00

Tân Hưng is a commune (xã) and village in Cà Mau province, in Vietnam.

The Standing Committee of the National Assembly issued Resolution No. 1655/NQ-UBTVQH15 on the rearrangement of commune-level administrative units of Cà Mau Province in 2025 (the resolution takes effect from 16 June 2025). Accordingly, Tân Hưng Commune in Cà Mau Province was formed on the basis of the adjustment of 29.60 km² in natural area with a population of 11,589 people from Đông Hưng Commune; the adjustment of 2.91 km² in natural area with a population of 924 people from Đông Thới Commune; the adjustment of 3.70 km² in natural area with a population of 1,375 people from Hòa Mỹ Commune; and the entire natural area of 56.20 km² with a population of 21,334 people of Tân Hưng Commune, all belonging to Cái Nước District.
