= Đầm Dơi district =

Coordinates: 8°59′35″N 105°11′38″E

Đầm Dơi district Huyện Đầm Dơi
- Rural District
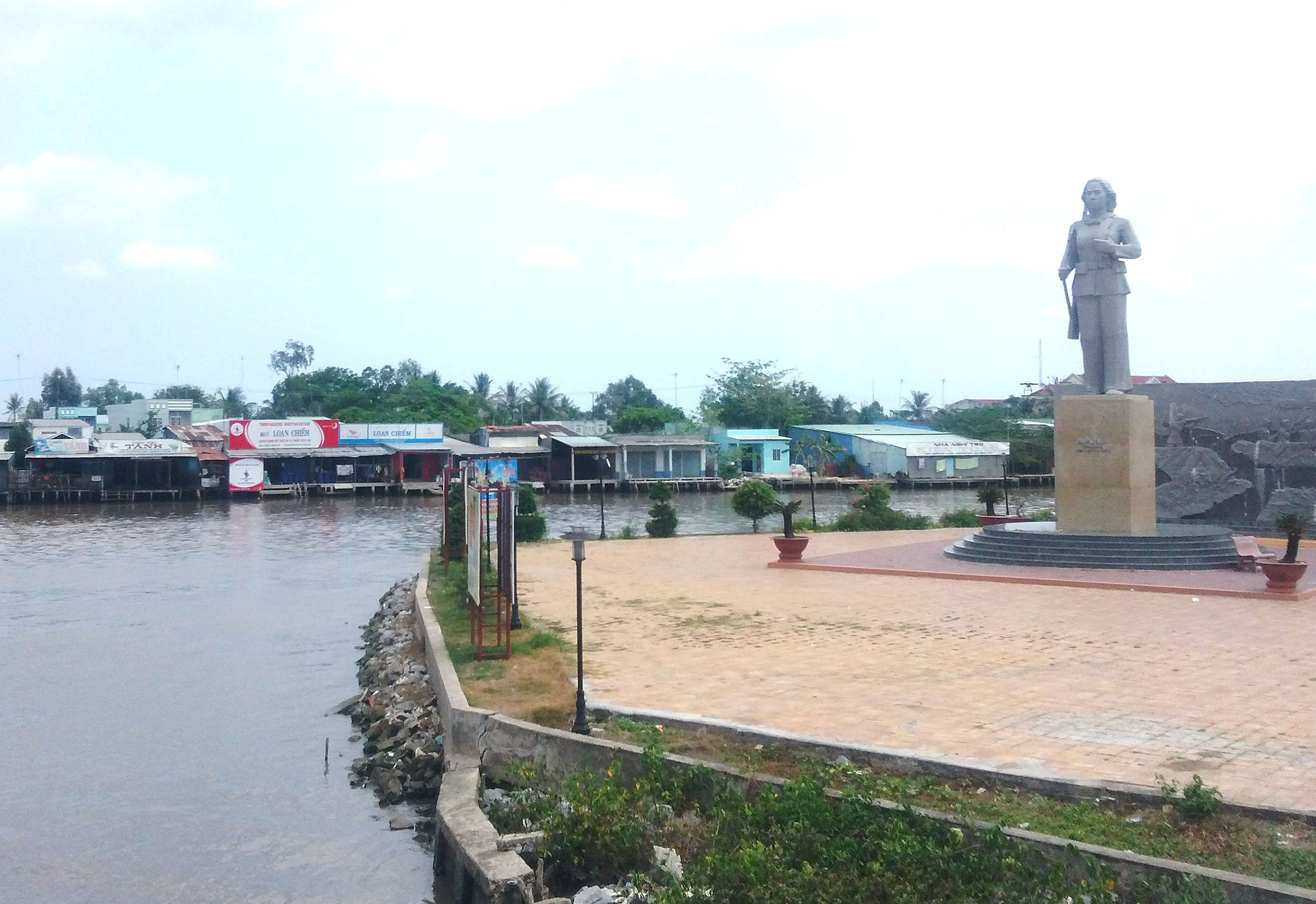
- Statue of Martyr Dương Thị Cẩm Vân at the centre of Đầm Dơi township.

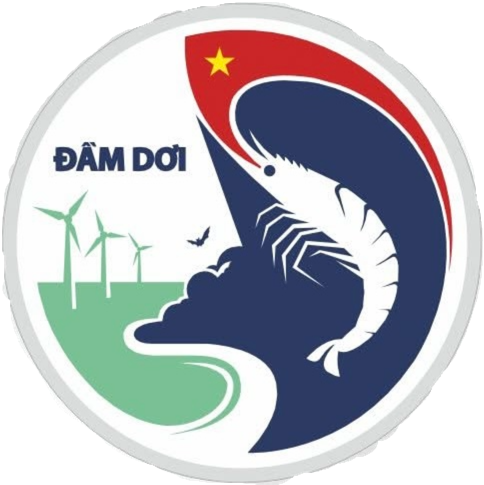
- Seal
- Nickname: "Spider-net land" (Note: Description of the river, canal and swamp system of the rural district.) (Xứ mạng-nhện)
- Motto: "From prosperity to health" (Vật thịnh – Nhân khang)
- Location of Đầm Dơi in Vietnam.
- Country: Vietnam
- Province: Cà Mau
- Existence: 1836 to August 30, 2025
- Central hall: No.1, Trần Văn Hy road, Block 1, Đầm Dơi township

Government
  - Type: Rural district
  - People Committee's Chairman: Lê Minh Hiền
  - People Council's chairman: Huỳnh Văn Hiền
  - Front Committee's chairman: Phạm Thanh Liêm
  - Party Committee's Secretary: Huỳnh Văn Hiền

Area
  - Rural District: 822.88 km^{2} (317.72 sq mi)

Population (December 31, 2022)
  - Rural District: 219,262
  - Density: 268/km^{2} (690/sq mi)
  - Urban: 10,769
  - Metro: 208,493
  - Ethnicities: Kinh (90%); Tanka (7.5%); Khmer (2.5%)
- Time zone: UTC+7 (Indochina Time)
- ZIP code: 98700 (Note: An official code from 2023 to 2025.)
- Climate: Cwa
- Website: Damdoi.Camau.gov.vn; Damdoi.Camau.dcs.vn

Đầm Dơi [ɗəm˨˩:jəːj˧˧] is a former rural district of Cà Mau province in the Mekong Delta region of Vietnam.

== History ==
=== Middle Ages ===
Before the 19th century, most of Cà Mau province was still a mangrove forest with low population and there was also very little information which were recorded by officials.

In the 17th year of Minh Mệnh (1836), "Đầm Dơi area" (xứ Đầm Dơi, "land of bat swamps") was first mentioned in Đại Nam nhất thống chí. However, this was not yet an official name but just a way to call a area of many fields for convenient demographic statistics. Just know that Đầm Dơi area was next to "Đầm Quạ area" (xứ Đầm Quạ, "land of crow swamps"), and both of them belong to Long Xuyên rural district of Hà Tiên province.

It was not until Cochinchina became a whole colony of the French Republic in 1867, an official administrative unit called Đầm Dơi rural district (huyện Đầm Dơi) that appeared. The rural district was based on the merger of two areas Đầm Dơi and Đầm Quạ. However, from the mid-19th century to the Second World War, this land has been divided with the rest of Cochinchina by its system of rivers, canals and forests with many crocodiles and snakes.

=== XX century ===
Under the State of Vietnam regime, Đầm Dơi district (quận Đầm Dơi) was part of Bạc Liêu province.

In 1956, the National Assembly of the First Republic of Vietnam issued a decree to establish An Xuyên province in the area of Cà Mâu peninsula (Note: Mâu, not Mau.). Since then, Đầm Dơi district has become a part of An Xuyên province. When the Vietnam War exploded, Việt Cộng partisans took advantage of the complex terrain of the district to fight the local government. Therefore, according to the CIA documents, Đầm Dơi was soon classified in the "red zone" (vùng đỏ) by the Republic of Vietnam Military Forces, which is a place where the fighting takes place so it was very dangerous for civilians.

On May 1, 1975, An Xuyên province was dissolved by the Government of the Republic of South Vietnam in their reason that "an evil residue of the former regime". Cà Mau province (Note: Mau, not Mâu.) was established, and Đầm Dơi district was changed as Ngọc Hiển rural district (huyện Ngọc Hiển). By 1976 when Vietnam was officially united in terms of legal, Ngọc Hiển continued to belong to Minh Hải province.

Until December 17, 1984, the Council of Ministers issued Decision 168-HĐBT (Note: Quyết định số 168-HĐBT ngày 17/12/1984 của Hội đồng Bộ trưởng về việc đổi tên một số huyện thuộc tỉnh Minh Hải.) on :

- The renaming Ngọc Hiển rural district to Đầm Dơi rural district.
- The renaming Ngọc Hiển township to Đầm Dơi township.

In August 1986, Chairman of the Council of Ministers Phạm Văn Đồng signed Decision 194/CT to recognize three bird sanctuaries Bạc Liêu, Chà Là and Đầm Dơi in the list of special-use forests. This event is considered to be the beginning of the formation of the Ngọc Hiển Bird Reserve (khu bảo tồn chim Ngọc Hiển), which occupies most of Đầm Dơi's area.

On November 6, 1996, the Vietnam National Assembly issued a resolution (Note: Nghị quyết về việc chia và điều chỉnh địa giới hành chính một số tỉnh do Quốc Hội ban hành.) on the division of Minh Hải province into two new provinces, Bạc Liêu and Cà Mau. Since then, Đầm Dơi rural district belonged to Cà Mau province.

=== XXI century ===
Since 2024, the Đầm Dơi District People's Committee under the direction of Cà Mau Province's leadership has promoted a long-term plan from 2025 to 2035 to promote the local commodity economy, thereby preparing for the upgrade of the location where has a high population density to establish at least one high-tech municipality.

Accordingly, the entire area of Tân Thuận commune (in the Southern zone of Gành Hào) is planned into a new urban area with the ambition to become a large port to bring the district's economy to reduce the canal system, which has gradually run out of water by the influences of hydroelectric factories on the Mekong River.

== Geography ==
=== Topography ===
Currently, Đầm Dơi rural district is divided into 16 commune-level administrative units. In particular, most are named after the notable persons.

- 1 municipality : Đầm Dơi capital-township.
- 15 communes : Ngọc Chánh, Nguyễn Huân, Quách Phẩm, Quách Phẩm Bắc, Tạ An Khương, Tạ An Khương Đông, Tạ An Khương Nam, Tân Dân, Tân Duyệt, Tân Đức, Tân Thuận, Tân Tiến, Tân Trung, Thanh Tùng, Trần Phán.

The district covers an area of 822.88 km^{2}. With its characteristics of the mangroves, Đầm Dơi population is concentrated mainly in the Northwest part of the rural district, where it has been exploited very early and has a complete inter-provincial road system. Most of the remaining area of the district so far only belongs to the Cà Mau Bird Reserve but it is less likely to exploit.

The location of Đầm Dơi township is inherently a meeting place for three rivers : Cửa Lớn, Đầm Dơi and Gành Hào. The East of the district has a small river called Đầm Chim (means "swamp of birds"), which goes to the sea through Hố Gùi estuary.

Theoretically, the Đầm Dơi residents were only able to move to other regions through the waterway. However, since the Republic of Vietnam regime, there were two roads that have been built : Đầm Dơi – Cà Mau and Đầm Dơi – Thanh Tùng. But these two routes are too narrow, so they are difficult to meet the needs of people. Therefore, the project of the East-West Axis has been designed in 2024 with a system of roads and bridges to turn Đầm Dơi township into a transition point between two cities Bạc Liêu and Cà Mau. Such as : Ông Đốc – Gành Hào provincial route; bridges Hòa Trung I, Hòa Trung II, Chà Là and Gành Hào.

=== Population ===
As of 2022, Đầm Dơi rural district had a population of 219,262. The population component consists of three ethnic groups registered officially, including as : Kinh, Hoa and Khmer. In particular, the rate of the Khmer group is decreasing in recent years due to the plunge of the economy.

The territory of the district has only one parish area called Bàu Sen, which located at Nam Chánh hamlet of Thanh Tùng commune, with about 50 parishioners. Bàu Sen belonged to the Cà Mau Deanery. The current priest is Bishop Peter Trịnh Quốc Việt.

== Culture ==
=== Customs ===
Contrary to the poorness of the land fund for settlement, Đầm Dơi rural district was known early as one of the localities with the most prosperous customs in the Mekong Delta.

According to the traditional concept of the Southern Vietnamese, the Hoa (Tanka group) are said to be the first residents to reclaim the area of Đầm Dơi, then to the Kinh and Khmer. Although the Khmer Kraom is often thought to be the oldest owner of Cochinchina, they almost abandoned the lands at the esturies, where the terrain is very dense and difficult to move. That leads to a typical, the custom of the rural district as a combination of two groups Tanka and Kinh.

From 24 to 26 of March (15 to 17 of February by Lunar Calendar), every year, when the Southern weather is about to enter the rainy season, the people of the whole district flock to Thanh Tùng hamlet of Thanh Tùng commune to attend Festival of Water-Dragon Goddess (lễ vía đức bà Thủy Long). According to local legends, there were two men, Tô Minh Chánh (Tanka) and Nguyễn Văn Lành (Kinh), from the Centre region to Đầm Dơi to reclaim and establish a village in 1820. Their small boat came to a junction of the river when they met a snakehead jumping into the boat, which was thought to be a good omen. They decided to stay here to make a career, and at the same time, set up a temple to worship the goddess protecting the land (bà chúa xứ). (Note: Lady of Water-Dragon Palace, Thủy-long Cung Thần-nữ.) The temple yard has a smaller temple, where worships Tiger Spirit the lord of mountains. (Note: According to the Eastern worldview, the combination of mountain and water is to represent the harmony of the universe, which leads to the prosperity of life.) On March 25, 2024, the Government of Vietnam passed the Minister of Culture, Sports and Tourism (Note: By Decision 3442/QĐ-BVHTTDL on November 11, 2023.) to recognize the Festival as a national intangible cultural heritage (di sản văn hóa phi vật thể cấp quốc gia).

=== Arts ===
In the past, most of Đầm Dơi's practices were closer to Bạc Liêu than Cà Mau. This is confirmed by the researchers based on the fact that : Floating market is very popular in other Cà Mau districts, but hardly appears in Đầm Dơi, but at the same time, the art forms originating from Teochew community are extremely popular in this rural district.

Gành Hào (means "canal of oysters") is a big seaport where was shared between the two districts Đầm Dơi and Đông Hải. It is an address that soon became a legend in Vietnamese arts, because it is often considered to be the birthplace of vọng cổ (classic-style singing).

In modern Vietnamese culture, Đầm Dơi is considered a fertile land for the development of literary talents. This stems from the 2005 literary phenomenon Nguyễn Ngọc Tư to the appearance of young researcher and author Phạm Quốc Rin in 2006. Immediately after that generation was the appearance of many other authors, whom brought the district's young literature to the public nationwide.

Since the last years of 2010, many vocalists from Đầm Dơi have achieved success in the Vietnamese music market, especially in gold music and tuồng cải lương.

=== Tourism ===
Đầm Dơi is known for the Cà Mau Bird Sanctuary (tràm chim Cà Mau), which is 45 km Southeast of Cà Mau City. The sanctuary is home to many types of storks. The birds in the preserve tend to make nests in the top of very high trees and search for food in the early mornings.

== Economy ==
Đầm Dơi rural district has a 22 km long coastline, which overlooks the East Sea, so it is very convenient for the development of the professions related to the maritime industry. In fact, the district had a powerful fishing vessel very early, and it was one of the districts what has the total income related to fisheries at the highest level of Vietnam.

The three esturies Gành Hào, Hố Gùi and Giá Lồng Đèn have suitable environments for shrimp farming. Specifically, the Đầm Dơi rural district is, for the most part, a key supplier of snakehead for Saigonese consumers.

According to the plan of the Cà Mau Provincial People's Committee based on the promotion and brokerage of the Cà Mau Department of Planning and Investment, the project of the Đầm Dơi Township-Market began to be promoted since December 31, 2024, to attract investment with the intended amount of 37,45 billion Vietnam dongs. The future market is given priority located in the 2,533 square meters at the junction of the river (Note: Tam Giang junction. In particular, "tam giang" means "three rivers".), where is the center of Đầm Dơi township. The purpose of this project is to raise the township, thereby awakening the economic potential of the whole district.

== See also ==
- Cái Nước district
- Đông Hải district
- Năm Căn district
