= Lương Thế Trân =

- Ward and village
- Interactive map of Lương Thế Trân
- Country: Vietnam
- Province: Cà Mau

Area
  - Total: 52.25 sq mi (135.32 km^{2})

Population (31/12/2025)
  - Total: 63,883
  - Density: 1,220/sq mi (472/km^{2})
- Time zone: UTC+07:00
- Area code: 32124
- Website: luongthetran.camau.gov.vn

Lương Thế Trân is a ward (phường) and village in Cà Mau province, in Vietnam.

The Standing Committee of the National Assembly issued Resolution No. 1655/NQ-UBTVQH15 on the rearrangement of commune-level administrative units of Cà Mau Province in 2025 (the resolution takes effect from 16 June 2025). Accordingly, Lương Thế Trân Commune was established in Cà Mau Province on the basis of the entire natural area of 33.5 km² and a population of 18,763 people of Thạnh Phú Commune; the entire natural area of 43.5 km² and a population of 20,727 people of Phú Hưng Commune; the entire natural area of 31.1 km² and a population of 13,608 people of Lương Thế Trân Commune, all belonging to Cái Nước District; and the adjustment of 27.80 km² in natural area with a population of 9,844 people from Lợi An Commune, Trần Văn Thời District.
