= List of Western Pacific severe tropical storms =

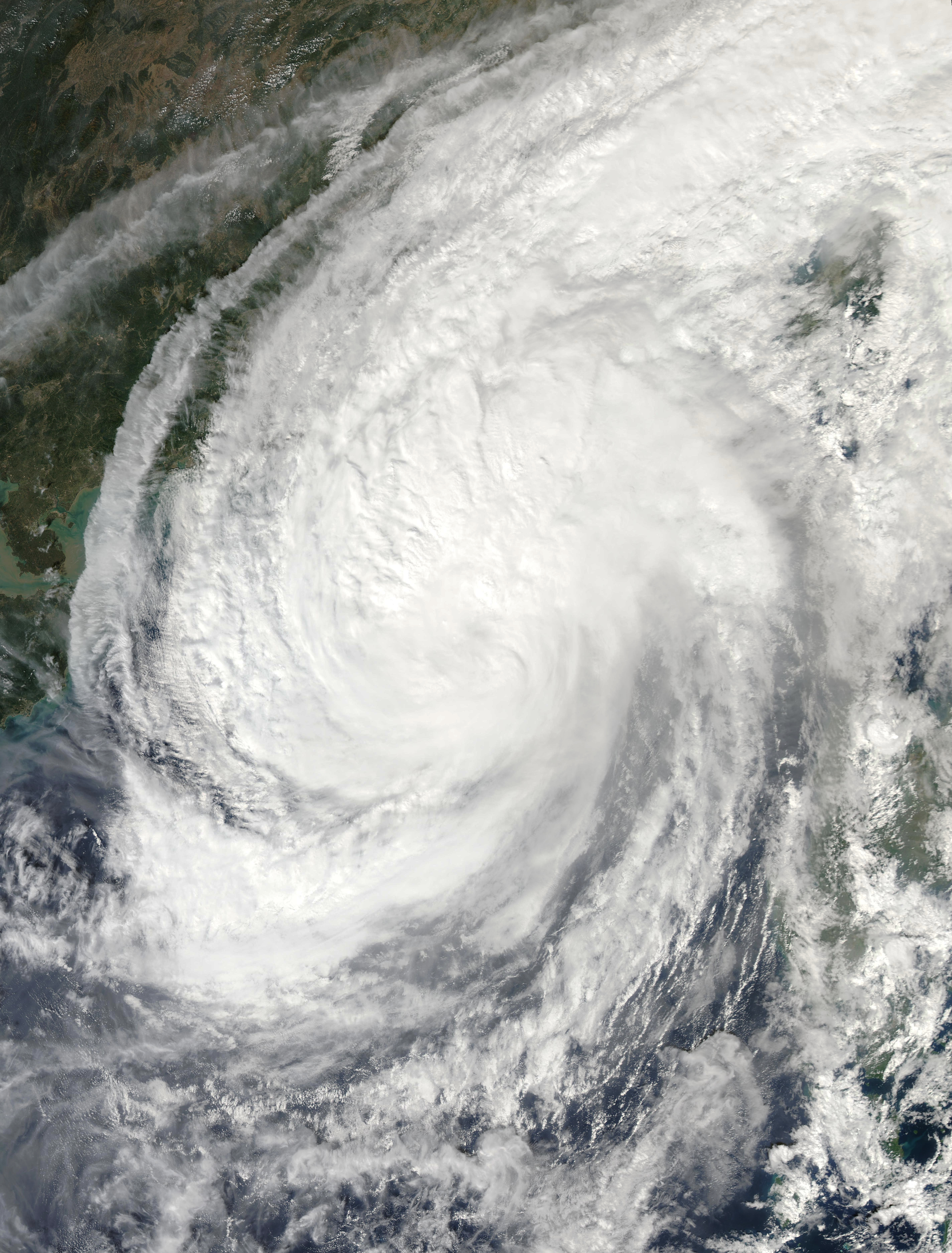
Severe Tropical Storm Nalgae nearing South China in October 2022

A severe tropical storm is the third highest category used by the Japan Meteorological Agency (JMA) to classify tropical cyclones in the Northwest Pacific basin. The basin is limited to the north of the equator between the 100th meridian east and the 180th meridian. The category of the severe tropical storm is defined as a tropical cyclone that has 10-minute sustained wind speeds of between 48 and 63 knots (89–117 km/h; 55–73 mph).

== Background ==
ESCAP/WMO Typhoon Committee's Tropical Cyclone Intensity Scale
Category	Sustained winds
Violent typhoon	≥105 knots ≥194 km/h
Very strong typhoon	85–104 knots 157–193 km/h
Strong typhoon	64–84 knots 118–156 km/h
Severe tropical storm	48–63 knots 89–117 km/h
Tropical storm	34–47 knots 62–88 km/h
Tropical depression	≤33 knots ≤61 km/h

The Northwest Pacific basin covers a vast area in the Pacific Ocean, located north of the equator, between 100°E and 180°E. Several weather agencies monitor this basin, however it is officially monitored by the Japan Meteorological Agency (JMA, RSMC Tokyo), who is responsible for forecasting, naming and issuing warnings for tropical cyclones. Unofficially, the Joint Typhoon Warning Center also monitors the basin, however these warnings measures 1-minute sustained wind speeds, comparing their scale to the Saffir–Simpson scale. The JMA uses a simpler scale on classifying tropical cyclones adapted by the ESCAP/WMO Typhoon Committee measuring 10-minute sustained wind speeds, ranging from a tropical depression, tropical storm, severe tropical storm and typhoon.

This article covers a list of systems developing in the Northwest Pacific basin that were classified by the JMA's category of a severe tropical storm. The category of a severe tropical storm ranges with 10-minute sustained winds of 48–63 kn (25–32 m/s; 55–72 mph; 89–117 km/h).

== Systems ==
Key

- † Discontinuous duration (weakened below Severe tropical storm then restrengthened to that classification at least once)

=== 1977–1979 ===
Name	Duration as a Severe tropical storm	Duration (hours)	Sustained wind speeds	Pressure	Areas affected	Deaths	Damage (USD)
Patsy	March 28, 1977	18	95 km/h (60 mph)	990 hPa (29.23 inHg)	None	None	None
Ruth	June 15 – 16, 1977	30	110 km/h (70 mph)	975 hPa (28.79 inHg)	Philippines, China, Taiwan	Unknown	Unknown
Amy	August 23 – 24, 1977	30	110 km/h (70 mph)	980 hPa (28.94 inHg)	Philippines, Taiwan, Ryukyu Islands	None	None
Emma	September 15 – 19, 1977	102	110 km/h (70 mph)	965 hPa (28.50 inHg)	Mariana Islands, Japan	None	None
Freda	September 23 – 24, 1977	30	100 km/h (65 mph)	980 hPa (28.94 inHg)	Philippines, China, Taiwan	1	Unknown
Harriet	October 18 – 20, 1977	60	100 km/h (65 mph)	980 hPa (28.94 inHg)	None	None	None
Nadine	January 11 – 13, 1978	36	100 km/h (65 mph)	985 hPa (29.09 inHg)	Marshall Islands	None	None
Agnes	July 26 – 29, 1978	84	100 km/h (65 mph)	980 hPa (28.94 inHg)	South China	3	Unknown
Kit	September 25, 1978	6	95 km/h (60 mph)	990 hPa (29.23 inHg)	Philippines, South China, Vietnam	Unknown	Unknown
Nina	October 9 – 13, 1978	102	110 km/h (70 mph)	975 hPa (28.79 inHg)	Philippines, South China, Vietnam	59	Unknown
Tess	November 3 – 6, 1978	66	110 km/h (70 mph)	975 hPa (28.79 inHg)	Philippines, South China, Vietnam	None	None
Winnie	November 28 – 30, 1978	36	100 km/h (65 mph)	980 hPa (28.94 inHg)	Mariana Islands	None	None
Faye	July 5, 1979	12	100 km/h (65 mph)	990 hPa (29.23 inHg)	Mariana Islands	None	None
Gordon	July 28 – 30, 1979	30	100 km/h (65 mph)	975 hPa (28.79 inHg)	Philippines, South China, Taiwan	Unknown	Unknown
Mac	September 16 – 18, 1979	54	100 km/h (65 mph)	985 hPa (29.09 inHg)	Philippines, South China	Unknown	Unknown
Wayne	November 10, 1979	12	95 km/h (60 mph)	990 hPa (29.23 inHg)	Philippines	None	None

=== 1980s ===
Name	Duration as a Severe tropical storm	Duration (hours)	Sustained wind speeds	Pressure	Areas affected	Deaths	Damage (USD)
Carmen	April 6, 1980	12	110 km/h (70 mph)	985 hPa (29.09 inHg)	None	None	None
Forrest	May 23 – 24, 1980	30†	100 km/h (65 mph)	992 hPa (29.29 inHg)	Caroline Islands, Philippines	Unknown	Unknown
Georgia	May 23, 1980	24	100 km/h (65 mph)	980 hPa (28.94 inHg)	China	Unknown	Unknown
Herbert	June 25, 1980	6	95 km/h (60 mph)	990 hPa (29.23 inHg)	Philippines, South China	Unknown	Unknown
Ruth	September 15 – 16, 1980	18	100 km/h (65 mph)	980 hPa (28.94 inHg)	South China, Vietnam, Laos	106	Unknown
Thelma	September 29 – 30, 1980	30	100 km/h (65 mph)	975 hPa (28.79 inHg)	None	None	None
Gerald	April 16 – 17, 1981	12	110 km/h (70 mph)	980 hPa (28.94 inHg)	Mariana Islands, Caroline Islands	None	None
Ike	June 12 – 14, 1981	48	110 km/h (70 mph)	965 hPa (28.50 inHg)	East China, Taiwan, Ryukyu Islands	8	None
Kelly	July 2 – 4, 1981	66	110 km/h (70 mph)	965 hPa (28.50 inHg)	Philippines, South China, Vietnam	192	$7.92 million
Lynn	July 4 – 6, 1981	48†	100 km/h (65 mph)	980 hPa (28.94 inHg)	Philippines, South China	22	None
Maury	July 18 – 19, 1981	18	95 km/h (60 mph)	985 hPa (29.09 inHg)	Taiwan, Ryukyu Islands, East China	38	None
Ogden	July 29, 1981	18	95 km/h (60 mph)	975 hPa (28.79 inHg)	Japan, South Korea	None	None
Phyllis	August 5, 1981	12	100 km/h (65 mph)	975 hPa (28.79 inHg)	None	None	None
Susan	August 8 – 11, 1981	84	110 km/h (70 mph)	980 hPa (28.94 inHg)	None	None	None
Vanessa	August 17 – 18, 1981	18	95 km/h (60 mph)	980 hPa (28.94 inHg)	None	None	None
Mamie	March 19, 1982	12	95 km/h (60 mph)	990 hPa (29.23 inHg)	Philippines, Vietnam	54	$1.01 million
Winona	July 24 – 25, 1982	24	95 km/h (60 mph)	985 hPa (29.09 inHg)	Philippines, South China	12	$2.2 million
Hope	September 5 – 6, 1982	36	100 km/h (65 mph)	980 hPa (28.94 inHg)	Vietnam	Unknown	Unknown
Roger	December 9 – 10, 1982	30	110 km/h (70 mph)	980 hPa (28.94 inHg)	Philippines	None	None
Ben	August 14, 1983	12	100 km/h (65 mph)	985 hPa (29.09 inHg)	Japan	None	None
Ida	October 8 – 11, 1983	66	110 km/h (70 mph)	975 hPa (28.79 inHg)	Mariana Islands, Japan	None	None
Joe	October 10 – 13, 1983	42	100 km/h (65 mph)	980 hPa (28.94 inHg)	Philippines, South China	None	None
Lex	October 24 – 26, 1983	42	95 km/h (60 mph)	985 hPa (29.09 inHg)	Philippines, Indochina	>200	None
Ruth	November 28, 1983	18	95 km/h (60 mph)	992 hPa (29.29 inHg)	Caroline Islands	None	None
Thelma	December 17, 1983	12	100 km/h (65 mph)	990 hPa (29.23 inHg)	Caroline Islands	None	None

=== 1990s ===
Name	Duration as a Severe tropical storm	Duration (hours)	Sustained wind speeds	Pressure	Areas affected	Deaths	Damage (USD)
Koryn	January 14 – 16, 1990	60	100 km/h (65 mph)	980 hPa (28.94 inHg)	Mariana Islands, Caroline Islands	None	None
Nathan	June 17 – 18, 1990	30	100 km/h (65 mph)	980 hPa (28.94 inHg)	Philippines, South China, Vietnam	12	None
Tasha	July 29 – 31, 1990	48	100 km/h (65 mph)	980 hPa (28.94 inHg)	South China, Vietnam	108	None
Winona	August 8 – 10, 1990	60	110 km/h (70 mph)	975 hPa (28.79 inHg)	Japan	None	None
Nell	November 11, 1990	12	95 km/h (60 mph)	990 hPa (29.23 inHg)	Vietnam, Cambodia	None	None
Sharon	March 9 – 11, 1991	12	95 km/h (60 mph)	985 hPa (29.09 inHg)	Caroline Islands, Philippines	None	None
Brendan	July 21 – 24, 1991	60	110 km/h (70 mph)	980 hPa (28.94 inHg)	Philippines, Taiwan, South China	None	None
Gladys	August 17 – 23, 1991	144	110 km/h (70 mph)	965 hPa (28.50 inHg)	Japan, Korean Peninsula	103	$420,000
Luke	September 17 – 19, 1991	54	100 km/h (65 mph)	980 hPa (28.94 inHg)	Japan	8	None
Verne	November 8 – 10, 1991	72	100 km/h (65 mph)	980 hPa (28.94 inHg)	Caroline Islands, Mariana Islands	8	None
Zelda	November 29 – December 2, 1991	72	110 km/h (70 mph)	975 hPa (28.79 inHg)	Marshall Islands	None	None
Axel	January 7 – 9, 1992	60	100 km/h (65 mph)	980 hPa (28.94 inHg)	Marshall Islands, Caroline Islands, Mariana Islands	None	None
Gary	July 22, 1992	24	100 km/h (65 mph)	980 hPa (28.94 inHg)	Philippines, South China	48	$940 million
Irving	August 3 – 4, 1992	24	100 km/h (65 mph)	985 hPa (29.09 inHg)	Japan, South Korea	3	$835,000
Polly	August 29 – 31, 1992	51	100 km/h (65 mph)	975 hPa (28.79 inHg)	Taiwan, Ryukyu Islands, East China	202	$450 million
Ted	September 20 – 23, 1992	84	95 km/h (60 mph)	985 hPa (29.09 inHg)	Philippines, Taiwan, East China, Korean Peninsula, East China	61	$360 million
Colleen	October 20 – 28, 1992	174†	100 km/h (65 mph)	985 hPa (29.09 inHg)	Philippines, Indochina	Unknown	Unknown
Irma	March 15 – 16, 1993	24	95 km/h (60 mph)	985 hPa (29.09 inHg)	Marshall Islands, Caroline Islands	10	None
Lewis	July 10 – 12, 1993	54	95 km/h (60 mph)	985 hPa (29.09 inHg)	Philippines, South China, Vietnam	None	None
Nathan	July 23 – 24, 1993	53	100 km/h (65 mph)	980 hPa (28.94 inHg)	Mariana Islands, Japan	None	None
Percy	July 28 – 30, 1993	39	100 km/h (65 mph)	980 hPa (28.94 inHg)	Mariana Islands, Japan	None	None
Steve	August 9 – 11, 1993	60	100 km/h (65 mph)	980 hPa (28.94 inHg)	Mariana Islands, Ryukyu Islands	None	None
Zola	September 8, 1993	15	95 km/h (60 mph)	985 hPa (29.09 inHg)	Japan	None	None
Hattie	October 24, 1993	12	95 km/h (60 mph)	980 hPa (28.94 inHg)	Marshall Islands	None	None
Nell	December 25 – 27 1994	66	110 km/h (70 mph)	975 hPa (28.79 inHg)	Philippines	None	None
Owen	April 3 – 5, 1994	54	110 km/h (70 mph)	980 hPa (28.94 inHg)	Caroline Islands, Philippines	10	None
Russ	June 6 – 7, 1994	30	95 km/h (60 mph)	985 hPa (29.09 inHg)	China	74	$728 million
Zeke	July 22 – 23, 1994	18	95 km/h (60 mph)	985 hPa (29.09 inHg)	None	None	None
Bobbie	December 23 – 24, 1994	24	95 km/h (60 mph)	985 hPa (29.09 inHg)	Marshall Islands, Caroline Islands, Mariana Islands	None	None
Gary	July 30 – 31, 1995	30	100 km/h (65 mph)	980 hPa (28.94 inHg)	Philippines, China	2	None
Helen	August 11, 1995	18	110 km/h (70 mph)	985 hPa (29.09 inHg)	Philippines, South China	23	None
Lois	August 27 – 29, 1995	54	95 km/h (60 mph)	980 hPa (28.94 inHg)	South China, Indochina	None	None
Sibyl	September 30 – October 3, 1995	78	95 km/h (60 mph)	985 hPa (29.09 inHg)	Philippines, China	108	$35.8 million
Ted	October 12, 1995	12	95 km/h (60 mph)	990 hPa (29.23 inHg)	Philippines, South China	None	None
Yvette	October 26, 1995	6	95 km/h (60 mph)	985 hPa (29.09 inHg)	Philippines, Indochina	Unknown	Unknown
Dan	December 28 – 30, 1995	66	100 km/h (65 mph)	985 hPa (29.09 inHg)	Caroline Islands, Philippines	None	None
Frankie	July 23, 1996	12	95 km/h (60 mph)	975 hPa (28.79 inHg)	South China, Vietnam	104	$204 million
Joy	August 2 – 3, 1996	30	100 km/h (65 mph)	980 hPa (28.94 inHg)	None	None	None
Willie	September 19 – 21, 1996	42	100 km/h (65 mph)	980 hPa (28.94 inHg)	South China, Indochina	38	None
Beth	October 16 – 19, 1996	84	110 km/h (70 mph)	980 hPa (28.94 inHg)	Philippines, Vietnam	1	None
Fern	December 24 – 28, 1996	96	110 km/h (70 mph)	980 hPa (28.94 inHg)	Caroline Islands, Mariana Islands	None	$3 million
Victor	August 1 – 2, 1997	48	110 km/h (70 mph)	980 hPa (28.94 inHg)	China	65	$241 million
Yule	August 20 – 22, 1997	54	100 km/h (65 mph)	980 hPa (28.94 inHg)	Marshall Islands	None	None
Zita	August 21 – 22, 1997	24	100 km/h (65 mph)	980 hPa (28.94 inHg)	South China	352	$438 million
Fritz	September 24 – 25, 1997	18	100 km/h (65 mph)	980 hPa (28.94 inHg)	Vietnam, Laos, Cambodia	28	$5.1 million
Linda	November 2, 1997	24	95 km/h (60 mph)	985 hPa (29.09 inHg)	Vietnam, Thailand	3,123	$385 million
Penny	August 10, 1998	12	95 km/h (60 mph)	985 hPa (29.09 inHg)	Philippines, South China	1	None
Stella	September 14 – 16, 1999	48	95 km/h (60 mph)	985 hPa (29.09 inHg)	Mariana Islands, Japan	3	$2.17 million
Kate	April 25 – 27, 1999	66	100 km/h (65 mph)	980 hPa (28.94 inHg)	Philippines	None	None
Neil	July 25 – 26, 1999	30	95 km/h (60 mph)	980 hPa (28.94 inHg)	Philippines	15	None
Sam	August 20 – 22, 1999	54	100 km/h (65 mph)	980 hPa (28.94 inHg)	Philippines, South China	20	$35 million
Dora	August 19 – 20, 1999	12	95 km/h (60 mph)	990 hPa (29.23 inHg)	Wake Island	None	None
Tanya	August 21, 1999	12	95 km/h (60 mph)	1000 hPa (29.53 inHg)	Wake Island	None	None
Virgil	August 25, 1999	6	95 km/h (60 mph)	1000 hPa (29.53 inHg)	None	None	None
York	September 14 – 16, 1999	60	100 km/h (65 mph)	980 hPa (28.94 inHg)	Philippines, South China	17	$34 million
Ann	September 16 – 17, 1999	36	95 km/h (60 mph)	985 hPa (29.09 inHg)	East China	None	None
Gloria	November 15 – 16, 1999	30	95 km/h (60 mph)	980 hPa (28.94 inHg)	None	None	None

=== 2000s ===
The JMA tracked a total of 42 severe tropical storms from 2000 through to 2009. Fortunately, many of these storms did not affect any landmass, however there were a few notable storms like Kammuri in 2002 and Bilis in 2006 which both impacted mainland China, killing hundreds of people and causing total combined damages of nearly US$5 billion. Bilis ended up killing a total of 859 people, making it one of the deadliest storms in China, and also, being known as the tenth wettest tropical cyclone in the country.

Name	Duration as a Severe tropical storm	Duration (hours)	Sustained wind speeds	Pressure	Areas affected	Deaths	Damage (USD)	Refs
Bolaven	July 29, 2000	6	95 km/h (60 mph)	980 hPa (28.94 inHg)	Philippines, Ryukyu Islands, South Korea	None	None	
Sonamu	September 17 – 18, 2000	24	100 km/h (65 mph)	980 hPa (28.94 inHg)	Japan	None	None	
Bebinca	November 1 – 6, 2000	90†	110 km/h (70 mph)	980 hPa (28.94 inHg)	Philippines, South China	26	None	
Cimaron	May 13, 2001	6	95 km/h (60 mph)	985 hPa (29.09 inHg)	Philippines, Taiwan	None	$555,000	
Durian	June 30 – July 1, 2001	36	95 km/h (60 mph)	970 hPa (28.64 inHg)	South China, Vietnam	110	$422 million	
Utor	July 3 – 5, 2001	66	110 km/h (70 mph)	960 hPa (28.35 inHg)	Philippines, South China, Vietnam	197	$332 million	
Yutu	July 24 – 25, 2001	36	100 km/h (65 mph)	975 hPa (28.79 inHg)	Philippines, South China, Vietnam	None	$75.5 million	
Noguri	June 9 – 10, 2002	36	110 km/h (70 mph)	975 hPa (28.79 inHg)	Taiwan, Japan	None	$4 million	
Nakri	July 10, 2002	6	95 km/h (60 mph)	983 hPa (29.03 inHg)	East China, Taiwan, Japan	2	None	
Kammuri	August 4 – 5, 2002	18	100 km/h (65 mph)	980 hPa (28.94 inHg)	China	153	$509 million	
Bavi	October 11 – 12, 2002	30	100 km/h (65 mph)	985 hPa (29.09 inHg)	None	None	None	
Maysak	October 28 – 29, 2002	30	100 km/h (65 mph)	980 hPa (28.94 inHg)	None	None	None	
Linfa	May 29 – 30, 2003	30	100 km/h (65 mph)	980 hPa (28.94 inHg)	Philippines, Japan	41	$28.2 million	
Nangka	June 1 – 2, 2003	24	95 km/h (60 mph)	985 hPa (29.09 inHg)	Taiwan, Philippines, Japan	None	None	
Koni	July 20 – 21, 2003	42	110 km/h (70 mph)	975 hPa (28.79 inHg)	Philippines, South China, Vietnam	7	$16.9 million	
Melor	October 31 – November 1, 2003	12	95 km/h (60 mph)	980 hPa (28.94 inHg)	Taiwan, Philippines, Japan	4	None	
Omais	May 19, 2004	12	95 km/h (60 mph)	985 hPa (29.09 inHg)	Caroline Islands	None	None	
Chanthu	June 12, 2004	18	110 km/h (70 mph)	975 hPa (28.79 inHg)	Philippines, Indochina	39	$7.9 million	
Sarika	September 5 – 6, 2004	42	100 km/h (65 mph)	980 hPa (28.94 inHg)	Mariana Islands	None	None	
Kulap	January 17 – 18, 2005	30	95 km/h (60 mph)	985 hPa (29.09 inHg)	Caroline Islands	None	None	
Roke	March 16, 2005	18	100 km/h (65 mph)	980 hPa (28.94 inHg)	Caroline Islands, Philippines	7	$166,000	
Banyan	July 23 – 25, 2005	60	100 km/h (65 mph)	975 hPa (28.79 inHg)	Japan	None	None	
Sanvu	August 12 – 13, 2005	24	95 km/h (60 mph)	985 hPa (29.09 inHg)	Philippines, Taiwan, East China	None	None	
Guchol	August 22 – 25, 2005	78	100 km/h (65 mph)	980 hPa (28.94 inHg)	None	None	None	
Bolaven	November 17 – 19, 2005	54	100 km/h (65 mph)	985 hPa (29.09 inHg)	Philippines	None	None	
Bilis	July 10 – 14, 2006	102	110 km/h (70 mph)	970 hPa (28.64 inHg)	Caroline Islands, Taiwan, East China	859	$4.4 billion	
Bopha	August 7 – 8, 2006	33	100 km/h (65 mph)	980 hPa (28.94 inHg)	Taiwan, East China	7	None	
Wukong	August 14 – 17, 2006	72	95 km/h (60 mph)	980 hPa (28.94 inHg)	Japan, South Korea	2	None	
Bebinca	October 4 – 5, 2006	24	95 km/h (60 mph)	980 hPa (28.94 inHg)	Mariana Islands, Japan,	33	None	
Danas	September 9 – 11, 2007	48	100 km/h (65 mph)	990 hPa (29.23 inHg)	None	None	None	
Lekima	October 1 – 3, 2007	72	110 km/h (70 mph)	975 hPa (28.79 inHg)	Philippines, Vietnam	110	$125 million	
Podul	October 6 – 7, 2007	30	100 km/h (65 mph)	985 hPa (29.09 inHg)	None	None	None	
Faxai	October 26 – 27, 2007	24	100 km/h (65 mph)	975 hPa (28.79 inHg)	Japan	1	$1.5 million	
Matmo	May 16, 2008	6	95 km/h (60 mph)	992 hPa (29.29 inHg)	Philippines, Japan	None	None	
Halong	May 17 – 19, 2008	48†	110 km/h (70 mph)	970 hPa (28.64 inHg)	Philippines, Japan	61	$100 million	
Kammuri	August 6, 2008	12	95 km/h (60 mph)	975 hPa (28.79 inHg)	Philippines, South China, Taiwan, Vietnam	204	$200 million	
Phanfone	August 10, 2008	6	95 km/h (60 mph)	996 hPa (29.41 inHg)	None	None	None	
Vongfong	August 16 – 17, 2008	42	95 km/h (60 mph)	990 hPa (29.23 inHg)	Japan	1	None	
Maysak	November 8 – 9, 2008	18	95 km/h (60 mph)	985 hPa (29.09 inHg)	Philippines, Vietnam	30	None	
Linfa	June 19 – 21, 2009	54	110 km/h (70 mph)	975 hPa (28.79 inHg)	Philippines, Japan	7	$105 million	
Krovanh	August 29 – 31, 2009	54	110 km/h (70 mph)	975 hPa (28.79 inHg)	Japan	None	None	
Dujuan	September 5 – 10, 2009	120	95 km/h (60 mph)	980 hPa (28.94 inHg)	Mariana Islands	None	None	

=== 2010s ===
From 2010 to 2019, the JMA tracked a total of 52 severe tropical storms. In December 2011, Severe Tropical Storm Washi impacted the southern part of the Philippines, killing a total of 2,546 people, making it one of the deadliest tropical cyclones to hit the country. Mekkhala in January 2015 also affected the Philippines, but was notable for interrupting Pope Francis’ visit to the country. Nine months later saw the most damaging severe tropical storm of the decade, where Etau mainly affected Japan, causing damages of up to ¥294 billion (US$2.44 billion) due to extreme flooding and various landslides. Moreover, Tropical Storm Pewa moved into the Northwest Pacific basin from the Central Pacific and was classified as a severe tropical storm by the JMA.

Name	Duration as a Severe tropical storm	Duration (hours)	Sustained wind speeds	Pressure	Areas affected	Deaths	Damage (USD)	Refs
Dianmu	August 9 – 10, 2010	45	95 km/h (60 mph)	985 hPa (29.09 inHg)	Japan, South Korea	37	$42 million	
Lionrock	August 30 – 31, 2010	42	95 km/h (60 mph)	985 hPa (29.09 inHg)	Philippines, Taiwan, South China	None	$65.1 million	
Malou	September 5 – 6, 2010	30	95 km/h (60 mph)	985 hPa (29.09 inHg)	Japan	None	None	
Meranti	September 9, 2010	12	100 km/h (65 mph)	985 hPa (29.09 inHg)	Taiwan, East China	3	$118 million	
Meari	June 23 – 26, 2011	96	110 km/h (70 mph)	975 hPa (28.79 inHg)	Philippines, Japan, South Korea	11	$1.24 million	
Nock-ten	July 28 – 39, 2011	48	95 km/h (60 mph)	985 hPa (29.09 inHg)	Philippines, Indochina	128	$126 million	
Merbok	August 6 – 9, 2011	78	95 km/h (60 mph)	980 hPa (28.94 inHg)	None	None	None	
Talas	August 27 – September 3, 2011	168	95 km/h (60 mph)	970 hPa (28.64 inHg)	Japan	82	$600 million	
Washi	December 16, 2011	6	95 km/h (60 mph)	992 hPa (29.29 inHg)	Philippines	2,546	$97.8 million	
Sanvu	May 24 – 26, 2012	66	110 km/h (70 mph)	975 hPa (28.79 inHg)	Mariana Islands	None	$20,000	
Talim	June 19, 2012	18	95 km/h (60 mph)	985 hPa (29.09 inHg)	Taiwan	1	$356 million	
Khanun	July 17 – 18, 2012	12	95 km/h (60 mph)	985 hPa (29.09 inHg)	Japan, Korean Peninsula	89	$11.4 million	
Kirogi	August 9, 2012	6	95 km/h (60 mph)	990 hPa (29.23 inHg)	None	None	None	
Ewiniar	September 26 – 28, 2012	72	95 km/h (60 mph)	985 hPa (29.09 inHg)	Mariana Islands	None	None	
Maliksi	October 3 – 4, 2012	30	95 km/h (60 mph)	985 hPa (29.09 inHg)	Mariana Islands	None	None	
Gaemi	October 3, 2012	6	95 km/h (60 mph)	990 hPa (29.23 inHg)	Philippines, Indochina	5	$4.1 million	
Maria	October 15, 2012	24	95 km/h (60 mph)	990 hPa (29.23 inHg)	Mariana Islands	None	None	
Sonamu	January 5 – 6, 2013	30	95 km/h (60 mph)	990 hPa (29.23 inHg)	Philippines, Vietnam, Borneo	2	None	
Rumbia	July 1, 2013	6	95 km/h (60 mph)	985 hPa (29.09 inHg)	Philippines, South China	7	$191 million	
Jebi	August 2 – 3, 2013	24	95 km/h (60 mph)	985 hPa (29.09 inHg)	Philippines, South China, Vietnam	7	$80.9 million	
Trami	August 19 – 22, 2013	60	110 km/h (70 mph)	965 hPa (28.50 inHg)	Philippines, East China, Taiwan, Ryukyu Islands	34	$598 million	
Pewa	August 19, 2013	18	100 km/h (65 mph)	990 hPa (29.23 inHg)	None	None	None	
Kong-rey	August 28, 2013	27	100 km/h (65 mph)	980 hPa (28.94 inHg)	Philippines, Taiwan, Japan	9	$21.2 million	
Pabuk	September 22 – 26, 2013	114	110 km/h (70 mph)	965 hPa (28.50 inHg)	Mariana Islands	None	None	
Tapah	April 29 – 30, 2014	30	95 km/h (60 mph)	985 hPa (29.09 inHg)	Wake Island, Japan	None	None	
Nakri	July 31 – August 2, 2014	42	100 km/h (65 mph)	980 hPa (28.94 inHg)	Japan, Korean Peninsula	15	$114,000	
Fengshen	September 7 – 10, 2014	66	110 km/h (70 mph)	975 hPa (28.79 inHg)	Japan	None	None	
Kammuri	September 26 – 27, 2014	18	95 km/h (60 mph)	985 hPa (29.09 inHg)	Mariana Islands	None	None	
Mekkhala	January 16 – 17, 2015	30	110 km/h (70 mph)	975 hPa (28.79 inHg)	Philippines	3	$8.92 million	
Linfa	July 8 – 9, 2015	36	95 km/h (60 mph)	980 hPa (28.94 inHg)	Philippines, Taiwan, South China	1	$285 million	
Etau	September 8, 2015	18	95 km/h (60 mph)	985 hPa (29.09 inHg)	Japan	8	$2.44 billion	
Choi-wan	October 4 – 6, 2015	36	110 km/h (70 mph)	965 hPa (28.50 inHg)	Wake Island, Japan	None	None	
Mirinae	July 27, 2016	6	100 km/h (65 mph)	980 hPa (28.94 inHg)	South China, Indochina	7	$346 million	
Nida	July 31 – August 1, 2016	48	110 km/h (70 mph)	975 hPa (28.79 inHg)	Philippines, Taiwan, South China, Vietnam	6	$316 million	
Omais	August 5 – 9, 2016	96	110 km/h (70 mph)	975 hPa (28.79 inHg)	Mariana Islands, Japan, Russia Far East	None	None	
Chanthu	August 14 – 17, 2016†	60	100 km/h (65 mph)	980 hPa (28.94 inHg)	Japan, Russia Far East	None	$94.7 million	
Aere	October 7 – 8, 2016	30	110 km/h (70 mph)	975 hPa (28.79 inHg)	Philippines, Taiwan, South China, Indochina	35	$112 million	
Tokage	November 26, 2016	12	95 km/h (60 mph)	992 hPa (29.29 inHg)	Philippines, Vietnam	1	$30,000	
Merbok	June 12, 2017	12	100 km/h (65 mph)	985 hPa (29.09 inHg)	Philippines, South China	None	$88.3 million	
Nanmadol	July 2 – 4, 2017	54	100 km/h (65 mph)	985 hPa (29.09 inHg)	Japan	42	$1.68 billion	
Talas	July 16, 2017	18	95 km/h (60 mph)	985 hPa (29.09 inHg)	Vietnam, Hainan	14	$79.2 million	
Pakhar	August 26 – 27, 2017	12	100 km/h (65 mph)	985 hPa (29.09 inHg)	Philippines, South China, Vietnam	13	$115 million	
Mawar	September 2 – 3, 2017	36	95 km/h (60 mph)	990 hPa (29.23 inHg)	Philippines, South China	None	$1.53 million	
Saola	October 27 – 29, 2017	63	110 km/h (70 mph)	975 hPa (28.79 inHg)	Caroline Islands, Japan	None	$250 million	
Maliksi	June 9 – 11, 2018	66	110 km/h (65 mph)	970 hPa (28.64 inHg)	Philippines, Ryukyu Islands, Japan	2	None	
Ampil	July 19 – 21, 2018	54	95 km/h (60 mph)	985 hPa (29.09 inHg)	Ryukyu Islands, East China	1	$241 million	
Wukong	July 25, 2018	18	95 km/h (60 mph)	994 hPa (29.35 inHg)	Japan, South Korea	None	None	
Leepi	August 13 – 14, 2018	42	95 km/h (60 mph)	990 hPa (29.23 inHg)	None	None	None	
Usagi	November 23 – 24, 2018	42	110 km/h (70 mph)	990 hPa (29.23 inHg)	Caroline Islands, Philippines, Vietnam, Cambodia	4	$40.5 million	
Bailu	August 22 – 24, 2019	48	95 km/h (60 mph)	985 hPa (29.09 inHg)	Philippines, Taiwan, South China	3	$28.2 million	
Matmo	October 30, 2019	18	110 km/h (70 mph)	980 hPa (28.94 inHg)	Philippines, Vietnam, Cambodia, Laos, Thailand	2	$39.3 million	
Fung-wong	November 20 – 21, 2019	30	110 km/h (65 mph)	990 hPa (29.23 inHg)	Philippines, Taiwan, Ryukyu Islands	None	None	

=== 2020s ===
As of 2025, 15 severe tropical storms have developed this decade.

Name	Duration as a Severe tropical storm	Duration (hours)	Sustained wind speeds	Pressure	Areas affected	Deaths	Damage (USD)	Refs
Mekkhala	August 10, 2020	12	95 km/h (60 mph)	992 hPa (29.29 inHg)	Philippines, Taiwan, East China	None	$159 million	
Higos	August 18 – 19, 2020	12	100 km/h (65 mph)	992 hPa (29.29 inHg)	Philippines, South China, Vietnam	7	$143 million	
Dolphin	September 22 – 23, 2020	48	110 km/h (70 mph)	975 hPa (28.79 inHg)	None	None	None	
Kujira	September 28 – 30, 2020	48	110 km/h (70 mph)	980 hPa (28.94 inHg)	None	None	None	
Atsani	November 4 – 6, 2020	54	95 km/h (60 mph)	994 hPa (29.35 inHg)	Philippines, Taiwan	None	$101,000	
Nida	August 6 – 8, 2020	48	100 km/h (65 mph)	992 hPa (29.29 inHg)	None	None	None	
Mirinae	August 7 – 8, 2021	24	95 km/h (60 mph)	980 hPa (28.94 inHg)	Ryukyu Islands, Japan	None	None	
Kompasu	October 10 – 13, 2021	66	100 km/h (65 mph)	975 hPa (28.79 inHg)	Philippines, Taiwan, South China, Vietnam	44	$127 million	
Namtheun	October 16, 2021	12	95 km/h (60 mph)	996 hPa (29.41 inHg)	None	None	None	
Ma-on	August 22 – 25, 2022	66	100 km/h (65 mph)	985 hPa (29.09 inHg)	Philippines, South China, Vietnam	3	$46.2 million	
Kulap	September 26 – 29, 2022	66	110 km/h (70 mph)	965 hPa (28.50 inHg)	None	None	None	
Nalgae	October 28 – November 1, 2022	78†	110 km/h (70 mph)	975 hPa (28.79 inHg)	Philippines, Hong Kong, Macau, South China	160	$321 million	
Talim	July 16 – 18, 2023	54	110 km/h (70 mph)	970 hPa (28.64 inHg)	Philippines, South China, Vietnam	3	$364 million	
Damrey	August 26 –28, 2023	48†	95 km/h (60 mph)	985 hPa (29.09 inHg)	None	None	None	
Prapiroon	July 21 – 23, 2024	54	100 km/h (65 mph)	985 hPa (29.09 inHg)	Philippines, Vietnam, South China, Laos, Thailand, Cambodia	23	$32.9 million	
Maria	August 8-9, 2024		100 km/h (65 mph)	980 hPa (28.94 inHg)	Bonin Islands, Japan	None	$22.4 million	
Trami	October 23-27, 2024		110 km/h (70 mph)	970 hPa (28.64 inHg)	Palau, Philippines, Taiwan, South China, Vietnam, Laos, Cambodia, Thailand	179	$405 million	
Wutip	June 12-14, 2025		100 km/h (65 mph)	980 hPa (28.94 inHg)	Philippines, Southern China, Vietnam, Cambodia, Laos, Thailand	21	$308 million	
Mun	July 3-5, 2025	†	95 km/h (60 mph)	990 hPa (29.23 inHg)	None	None	None	
Wipha	July 19-23, 2025	†	110 km/h (70 mph)	970 hPa (28.64 inHg)	Philippines, Taiwan, Southern China, Vietnam, Thailand, Laos, Cambodia, Myanmar	20	$717 million	
Co-May	July 24, 2025		110 km/h (70 mph)	975 hPa (28.79 inHg)	Philippines, Taiwan, Ryukyu Islands, Eastern China, South Korea	29	$42.9 million	
Tapah	September 8, 2025		110 km/h (70 mph)	980 hPa (28.94 inHg)	Philippines, Southern China	Unknown	None	
Mitag	September 19, 2025		95 km/h (60 mph)	992 hPa (29.29 inHg)	Philippines, Taiwan, Southern China	3	$102 million	
Fengshen	October 21, 2025		95 km/h (60 mph)	990 hPa (29.23 inHg)	Mariana Islands, Philippines, Taiwan, Southern China, Vietnam	54	$360 million	

== Climatology ==
Severe tropical storms by month
Month	Number of storms
January	7
February	0
March	5
April	5
May	9
June	18
July	35
August	56
September	42
October	31
November	18
December	9

Severe tropical storms by decade
Period	Number of storms
1977–79	16
1980s	59
1990s	58
2000s	42
2010s	52
2020s	14

== See also ==
- Typhoon
- Pacific typhoon season
- 2026 Pacific typhoon season
