= Khánh Bình =

Khánh Bình may refer to several places in Vietnam, including:

- Khánh Bình, Bình Dương, a ward of Tân Uyên, Bình Dương
- Khánh Bình, An Giang, a commune of An Phú district
- Khánh Bình, Khánh Hòa, a commune of Khánh Vĩnh district
- Khánh Bình, Cà Mau, a commune of Trần Văn Thời district

== See also ==
- The communes of Khánh Bình Đông, Khánh Bình Tây and Khánh Bình Tây Bắc in Trần Văn Thời District
