= Khánh Hưng =

Khánh Hưng may refer to several places in Vietnam, including:

- Khánh Hưng, Cà Mau, a commune of Trần Văn Thời district
- Khánh Hưng, Long An, a commune of Vĩnh Hưng district

== See also ==
- Khánh Hưng, capital of former Ba Xuyên Province in South Vietnam, now Sóc Trăng city.
