= Trần Văn Thời =

Trần Văn Thời may refer to:

- Trần Văn Thời, Cà Mau, commune in Cà Mau province, Vietnam
- Trần Văn Thời district, rural district of Cà Mau province
