= Khánh Hải =

Khánh Hải may refer to several places in Vietnam:

- Khánh Hải, Ninh Thuận, a township and capital of Ninh Hải District
- Khánh Hải, Cà Mau, a rural commune of Trần Văn Thời District
- Khánh Hải, Ninh Bình, a rural commune of Yên Khánh District
