= Sông Cầu (disambiguation) =

Sông Cầu may refer to several places in Vietnam, including:

- Sông Cầu, a district-level town of Phú Yên Province
- Sông Cầu, Bắc Kạn, a ward of Bắc Kạn City
- Sông Cầu, Thái Nguyên, a township of Đồng Hỷ District
- Sông Cầu, Khánh Hòa, a rural commune of Khánh Vĩnh District.

== See also ==
- Cầu River, a river in northern Vietnam
