= Typhoon Conson (2010) =

Pacific typhoon in 2010

Typhoon Conson (Basyang)
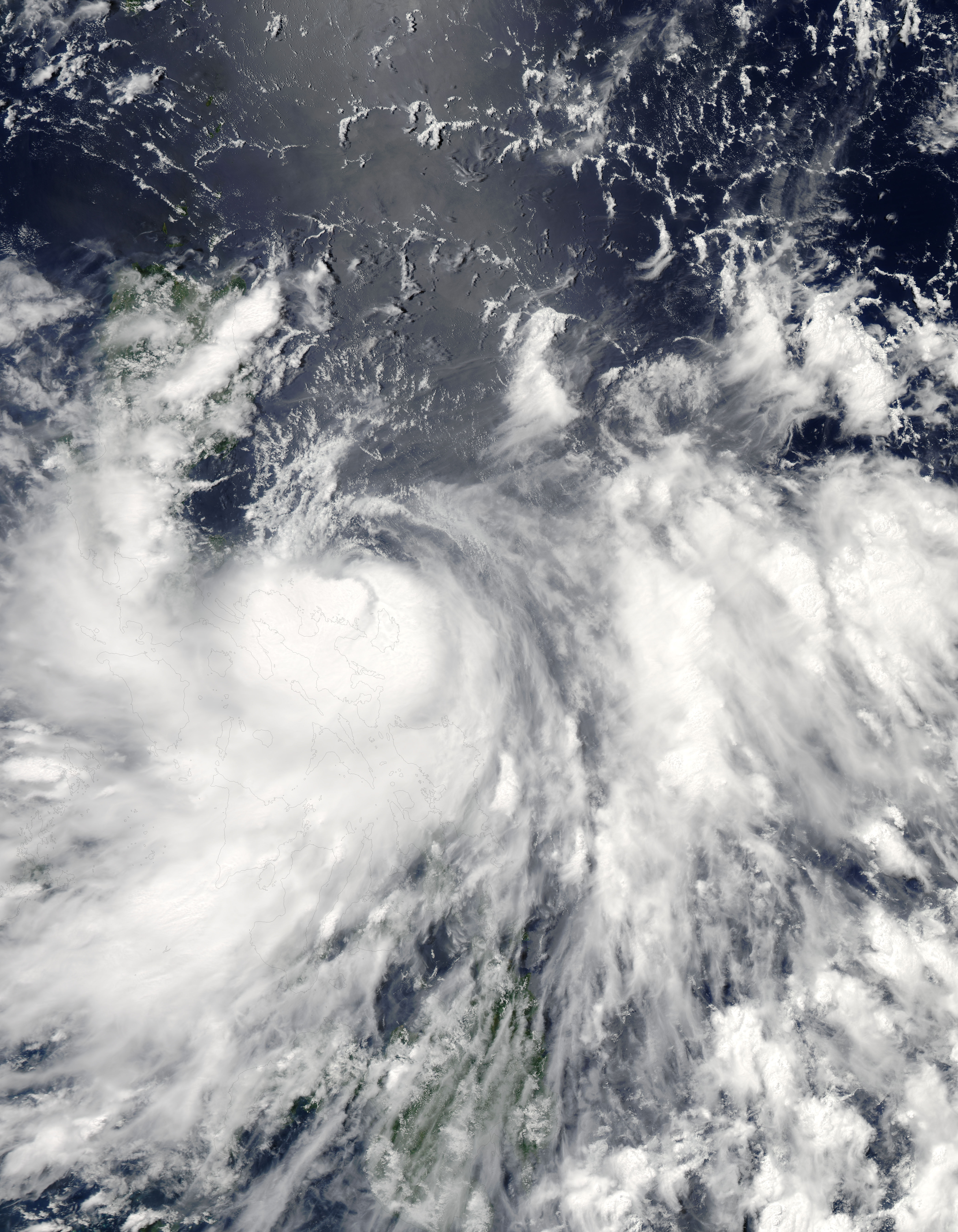
- Typhoon Conson approaching the Philippines on July 13

Meteorological history
- Formed: July 11, 2010
- Dissipated: July 18, 2010

Typhoon
- 10-minute sustained (JMA)
- Highest winds: 120 km/h (75 mph)
- Lowest pressure: 970 hPa (mbar); 28.64 inHg

Category 1-equivalent typhoon
- 1-minute sustained (SSHWS/JTWC)
- Highest winds: 150 km/h (90 mph)
- Lowest pressure: 963 hPa (mbar); 28.44 inHg

Overall effects
- Fatalities: 106 total
- Missing: 73
- Damage: $82 million (2010 USD)
- Areas affected: Philippines; China; Vietnam; Laos
- IBTrACS
- Part of the 2010 Pacific typhoon season

Typhoon Conson, (Note: The name Conson (Vietnamese: Côn Sơn, [kon˧˧ səːn˧˧]) was contributed by Vietnam and refers to Côn Sơn Island in southern Vietnam.) known in the Philippines as Typhoon Basyang, was the second tropical cyclone during the 2010 Pacific typhoon season to impact the Philippines. Developing out of a tropical disturbance east of the Philippines on July 11, 2010, Conson quickly developed as it tracked nearly due west. Favorable environmental conditions, such as low wind shear and warm sea surface temperatures, allowed the system to intensify into a severe tropical storm by July 12. Around the same time, the JTWC assessed the storm to have been equivalent to a Category 1 hurricane. The following day, Conson struck Quezon Province with winds of 100 km/h (60 mph) (Note: Wind speeds are listed by 10-minute standards unless otherwise noted.) before weakening. After crossing the archipelago, the storm entered the South China Sea where it was able to re-strengthen. By July 16, Conson attained typhoon status as it neared the southern Chinese island of Hainan. After brushing the island at peak intensity with sustained winds estimated at 130 km/h (80 mph), the storm weakened in the Gulf of Tonkin due to less favorable conditions. The storm eventually made landfall near Hanoi, Vietnam on July 17 and dissipated the following day.

In the Philippines, Conson produced widespread, torrential rains which triggered significant flooding. At least 76 people are known to have been killed across the country and 72 others are listed as missing. Preliminary damage estimates were placed at PHP189 million (US$4.1 million). In China, at least two people have been killed due to wind-related incidents. Hainan Province sustained significant damage from the typhoon, with damage estimated at ¥500 million (US$73.8 million). Widespread damage was reported in Vietnam where at least two people were killed and 17 others were listed as missing.

== Meteorological history ==
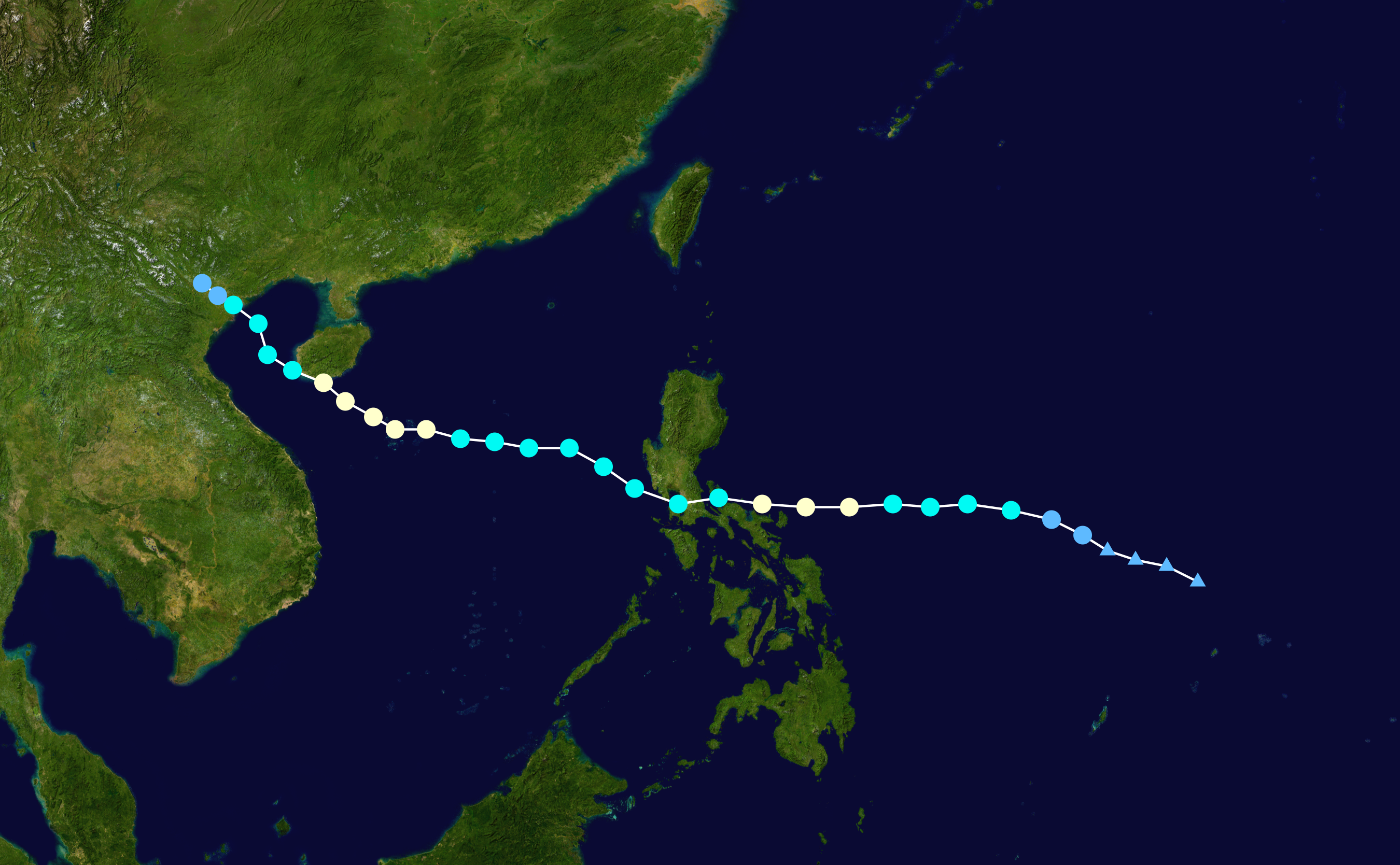
Map plotting the storm's track and intensity, according to the Saffir–Simpson scale Map key Saffir–Simpson scale Tropical depression (≤38 mph, ≤62 km/h) Tropical storm (39–73 mph, 63–118 km/h) Category 1 (74–95 mph, 119–153 km/h) Category 2 (96–110 mph, 154–177 km/h) Category 3 (111–129 mph, 178–208 km/h) Category 4 (130–156 mph, 209–251 km/h) Category 5 (≥157 mph, ≥252 km/h) Unknown Storm type Tropical cyclone Subtropical cyclone Extratropical cyclone, remnant low, tropical disturbance, or monsoon depression

Late on July 9, the Joint Typhoon Warning Center (JTWC), reported that a tropical disturbance had persisted within the vicinity of Yap island. Satellite imagery showed that the disturbance had a weak circulation which was stretching over Yap with disorganized convection. The disturbance was located to the south of a tropical upper tropospheric trough and was in an area of weak vertical windshear. During the next day, deep convection around the disturbance increased whilst a low to mid level circulation center appeared on satellite imagery. Early on July 11, the Japan Meteorological Agency (JMA) reported that the disturbance had intensified into a tropical depression, whilst the JTWC issued a Tropical Cyclone Formation Alert as the disturbance had consolidated and had multiple convective bands flowing into its low level circulation center.

During that afternoon the JTWC reported that the disturbance had intensified into Tropical Depression 03W and initiated advisories on the system, before reporting later that day due to favorable conditions it had intensified into a tropical storm. PAGASA also reported that afternoon that the disturbance had intensified into a depression and named it as Basyang. At 0000 UTC, the next day the JMA reported that Basyang had intensified into a weak tropical storm and assigned it the name Conson and the international designation of 1002. Twelve hours later, as Conson moved through favorable condition and along the southwestern edge of the subtropical ridge of high pressure, the JMA reported that the storm had rapidly intensified into a Severe Tropical Storm with windspeeds of 100 km/h (60 mph). Later that day at 1800 UTC the JTWC reported that after convection around the system had expanded and microwave imagery showed an eye-like feature, Conson had intensified into a typhoon. The JMA also reported at 1800 UTC that Conson had reached its initial 10-minute peak sustained windspeeds of 110 km/h (70 mph) despite predicting that it would intensify into a typhoon before making landfall in the Philippines. Early on July 13 the JTWC also reported that Conson had reached its initial 1-minute peak sustained windspeeds of 130 km/h (80 mph).

== Preparations ==
Typhoon Conson (Basyang) casualties in the Philippines

NDCC death tally
Region
Deaths
Missing
Region III
18
8
Region IV-A
63
11
Region V
21
26
Region VI
0
1
Total
102
46

Damages
	Amount
Agriculture	PhP239,409,880.00 ($5,174,200.74)
Infrastructure	PhP138,416,000.00 ($2,991,488.11)
Total damages (Note: Total damages figure includes agriculture, infrastructure, casualties, etc. damages.)	PhP377,825,880.00 ($8,165,688.85)

=== Philippines ===
Late on July 11, as they christened the tropical depression as Basyang, PAGASA placed the provinces of Cagayan, Isabela and Aurora under Storm Signal Number One, warning them to prepare for flash floods, landslides and strong winds. The next day, in addition to the signals already in force, PAGASA placed Quezon, Polillo Island, Camarines Norte and Catanduanes under Storm Signal Number One. Later that day, PAGASA placed the provinces of Catanduanes, Camarines Norte, Polillo Island, Aurora, Quirino and Isabela under Storm Signal Number Two while placing the provinces of Camarines Sur, Albay, Quezon, Rizal, Bulacan, Nueva Ecija, Nueva Vizcaya, Ifugao, Benguet, Mt. Province, Kalinga, Pampanga, Tarlac, Pangasinan, La Union, Abra, Ilocos Sur under Storm Signal Number One. On July 13, in the eyes of PAGASA, Conson had intensified into a typhoon. PAGASA made major revisions to the storm signals placing Catanduanes, Camarines Norte, Northern Quezon, Polillo Island and Aurora under Storm Signal Number Three. They also placed Camarines Sur, Laguna, Rizal, Bulacan, Nueva Ecija, Nueva Vizcaya, Quirino, Ifugao and Isabela under Storm Signal Number Two and Metro Manila, Albay, Marinduque, Batangas, Cavite, Bataan, Pampanga, Zambales, Tarlac, Pangasinan, La Union, Benguet, Mt. Province, Ilocos Sur, Kalinga, Apayao, Abra and Cagayan under Storm Signal Number One. After Conson had made landfall in Southern Luzon, PAGASA placed Metro Manila under Storm Signal Number Two. On July 14 at 1500 UTC, PAGASA lowered storm signals in all provinces.

=== Highest Public Storm Warning Signal ===
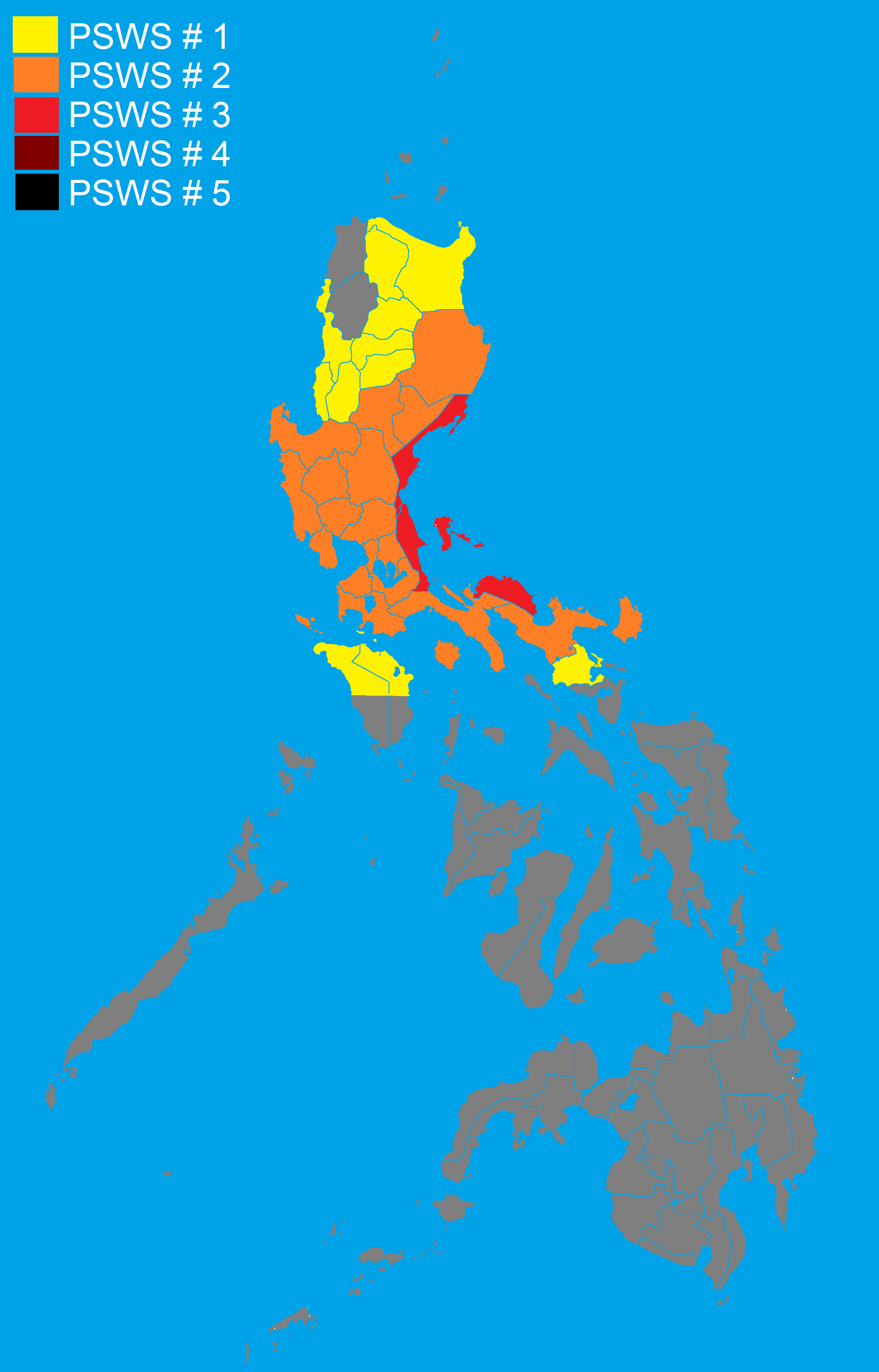
Highest public storm signals raised by PAGASA

PSWS#	LUZON	VISAYAS	MINDANAO
PSWS #3	Aurora, Northern Quezon, Polillo Island, Camarines Norte	NONE	NONE
PSWS #2	Metro Manila, Isabela, Quirino, Nueva Vizcaya, Nueva Ecija, Pangasinan, Zambales, Tarlac, Pampanga, Bataan, Bulacan, Rizal, Cavite, Batangas, Laguna, Marinduque, Southern Quezon, Camarines Sur, Catanduanes, Lubang Is.	NONE	NONE
PSWS #1	Cagayan, Apayao, Kalinga, Ilocos Sur, La Union, Benguet, Ifugao, Mt. Province, Northern Mindoro Provinces, Albay	NONE	NONE

=== China ===
The Macau Weather Bureau placed Macau under the Standby Signal Number 1, late on July 14, before the Hong Kong Observatory also issued the Standby Signal Number 1, early the next day for Hong Kong. During the afternoon of July 15 the China Meteorological Agency issued a Yellow typhoon warning for parts of Hainan Province and the western Guangdong coast.

Prior to the storm's arrival, officials in Hainan and Guangdong provinces initiated large-scale evacuations. An estimated 40,000 and 20,000 were relocated in Hainan and Guangdong respectively.

=== Vietnam ===
Throughout northern Vietnam, officials urged residents living along coastal areas to evacuate inland. Fishermen were also told to return to port in order to avoid being caught in dangerous swells in the typhoon. A total of 18,371 people heeded the warnings and evacuated and 40,337 ships returned. The Department of Water Resources stated that there was a likelihood that the storm would produce significant flooding across the region as rainfall between 100 and 200 mm (3.9 and 7.9 in) was anticipated. Farmers were told to construct dikes around their crops in attempts to protect their fields. A storm surge between of 3 to 5 m (9.8 to 16.4 ft) was forecast to impact the coast.

== Impact ==
=== Philippines ===
Within the Philippines, 102 people died and 46 people are listed as missing. Damage is estimated at 378 million (PHP, 8.15 million 2010 USD).

When Conson made landfall in Quezon province at 11:00 pm (PST)/ 15:00 (UTC), power supply in Metro Manila, including 35 hit provinces in Luzon, went out. Telecommunications were also lost. Trees were uprooted, poles were strewn on the streets and rooftops were blown off. Classes from primary to college were suspended until July 14. NAIA recorded wind gusts of 95 km/h. At regional airports, air traffic officials canceled 29 international and local flights due to dangerous flying conditions brought about by the storm. Elementary and pre-school classes for Metro Manila and affected provinces in Luzon canceled its classes before the afternoon of July 13. 15 Philippine Airlines flights from different airports were canceled due to heavy rain, gusty winds and near zero visibility. Roughly 500 passengers in Bicol and Quezon Province were stranded at their respective ports as the coast guard declared that ships may not depart due to high waves and heavy rains. Areas that had public storm signal warnings experienced high winds and torrential rains. Off the coast of Pandan, 20 fishermen went missing after their boats capsized amidst rough seas produced by the storm. By July 13, only one person had been rescued while the 19 others still remain missing. Near Bagamanoc, 11 other fishermen went missing due to similar incidents.

=== China ===
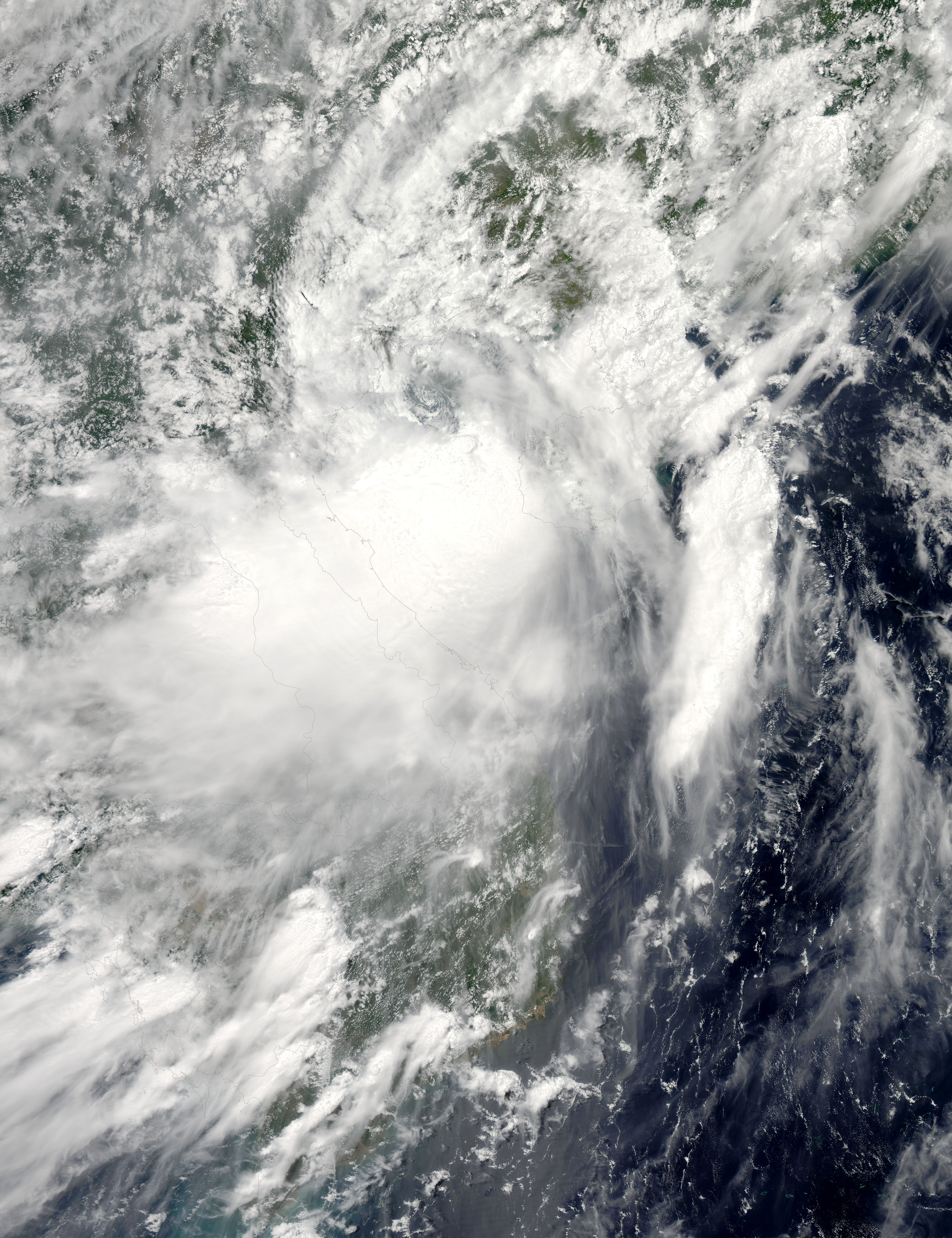
Tropical Storm Conson over the Gulf of Tonkin on July 17

On July 16, Typhoon Conson brushed the southern coast of Hainan Province, resulting in substantial damage. Along the coast, winds were recorded up to 126 km/h (78 mph). At least two people were killed in the country after being struck by advertisement billboards in separate incidents. Trees also fell across the island causing significant structural damage on homes and businesses. The storm produced moderate to heavy rainfall across Hainan, peaking at 182.9 mm (7.20 in) in Sanya along the southern coastline. The storm also ended a long dry spell affecting the island, leading to some seeing the storm as a positive event for the province. According to preliminary damage assessments, 544 homes were destroyed, 7,000 hectares (17,300 acres) of crops were lost and 572,326 people were affected. Monetary losses from the typhoon were estimated at ¥500 million (US$73.8 million), ¥120 million (US$17.7 million) of which was sustained Sanya alone.

Most of Sanya was left without power during Conson's passage as trees struck power lines and power poles were downed by high winds. Roads across the area became impassable due to fallen billboards, some reaching 5 m (16 ft) in height, and trees. The sudden onset of destructive winds caught many people off-guard, stranding them along roadways. Within 15 minutes, the local police in the city were overwhelmed with calls from residents. Further away from the storm's center, moderate to heavy rainfall was reported in association with Conson's outer bands in Guangdong. There, rainfall was measured up to 68 mm (2.7 in).

=== Vietnam and Laos ===
Due to the impact of the storm's circulation, a weather station on Bạch Long Vĩ Island (with the meteorological garden located at an elevation of 63 meters above sea level) recorded sustained wind speeds of 169 km/h (105 mph) and gusts reaching 205 km/h (128 mph). Wind gusts reached 148 km/h (92 mph) on Hòn Dáu Island (Haiphong), and 115 km/h (72 mph) in Cửa Ông and Bãi Cháy (Quảng Ninh). Regarding rainfall caused by the storm, precipitation reached 181 mm in Tiên Yên (Quảng Ninh) and 240 mm in Mai Hoá (Quảng Bình).

Off the coast of Vietnam, at least 13 fishermen were listed as missing after being caught in large swells produced by the storm. In Hai Phong City, 97 homes were damaged or destroyed and three people were injured. Along the coast of the Cát Hải District, Conson's storm surge inundated low-lying areas. As the storm moved inland, strong winds caused widespread power outages in Quảng Ninh Province. Roads and bridges in the area remained open; however, several motorcyclists were forced to stop driving and sit along the bridges as high winds made travel extremely dangerous. In the Tĩnh Gia District, one tourist drowned after being washed away by large swells at a beach house. Initial reports indicated that two others drowned; however, these were later proven incorrect. After the storm passed through, a second person, a child, was confirmed to have died during the storm. By the morning of July 18, 11 people were reported missing across the country. By July 24, reports throughout the country stated that 13 people were missing as a result of the storm. Binh Bridge, a mayor bridge of Hai Phong was hit by three ships which were set loose by the typhoon. One ship, the Vinashin Orient, was stuck under the deck, damage it. The bridge was closed, await damage assessment.

After moving inland, the remnants of Conson brought heavy rainfall to parts of northern Laos.

== Aftermath ==
=== Philippines ===
The upside-down and damaged logo of McDonald's in Antipolo, after being knocked down by Typhoon Conson in the Philippines. This was officially demolished in 2014 following safety concerns in the said area.

Conson was poorly forecasted by PAGASA. From July 12 to 13, Conson was forecasted to hit Aurora and Isabela provinces. But, at 11 pm PST (1500 UTC) on July 13 PAGASA changed its forecast from Isabela-Aurora landfall, to Quezon province landfall. However, residents living in those areas were not advised that the typhoon would hit their area and they also were not informed that public storm signal number 2 was raised. With this, severe damage ensued in the said areas. Later that same day, President Benigno Aquino III reprimanded PAGASA for failing to predict that Conson would pass over Manila.

=== China ===
Following the substantial damage in Sanya City, 1,000 police officers were deployed to keep order and ensure operations went smoothly. Fire and rescue teams relocated 200 people who were trapped in destroyed homes across the area.

=== Vietnam ===
Three vessels of the Vietnamese navy were sent to the region near the Paracel Islands to search for the trace of 27 fishermen which had been missing since July 17. 58 other fishermen were reported to have been previously rescued.

== See also ==
- Other tropical cyclones named Conson
- Other tropical cyclones named Basyang
- Typhoon Rammasun
- Tropical Storm Prapiroon (2024)
- Tropical Storm Mirinae (2016)
- Typhoon Vera (1983)
- 2010 South China floods
- Typhoon Vamco (2020) – took a similar path in 2020
