= Tropical Storm Lekima (2007) =

West Pacific severe tropical storm in 2007

Severe Tropical Storm Lekima (Hanna)
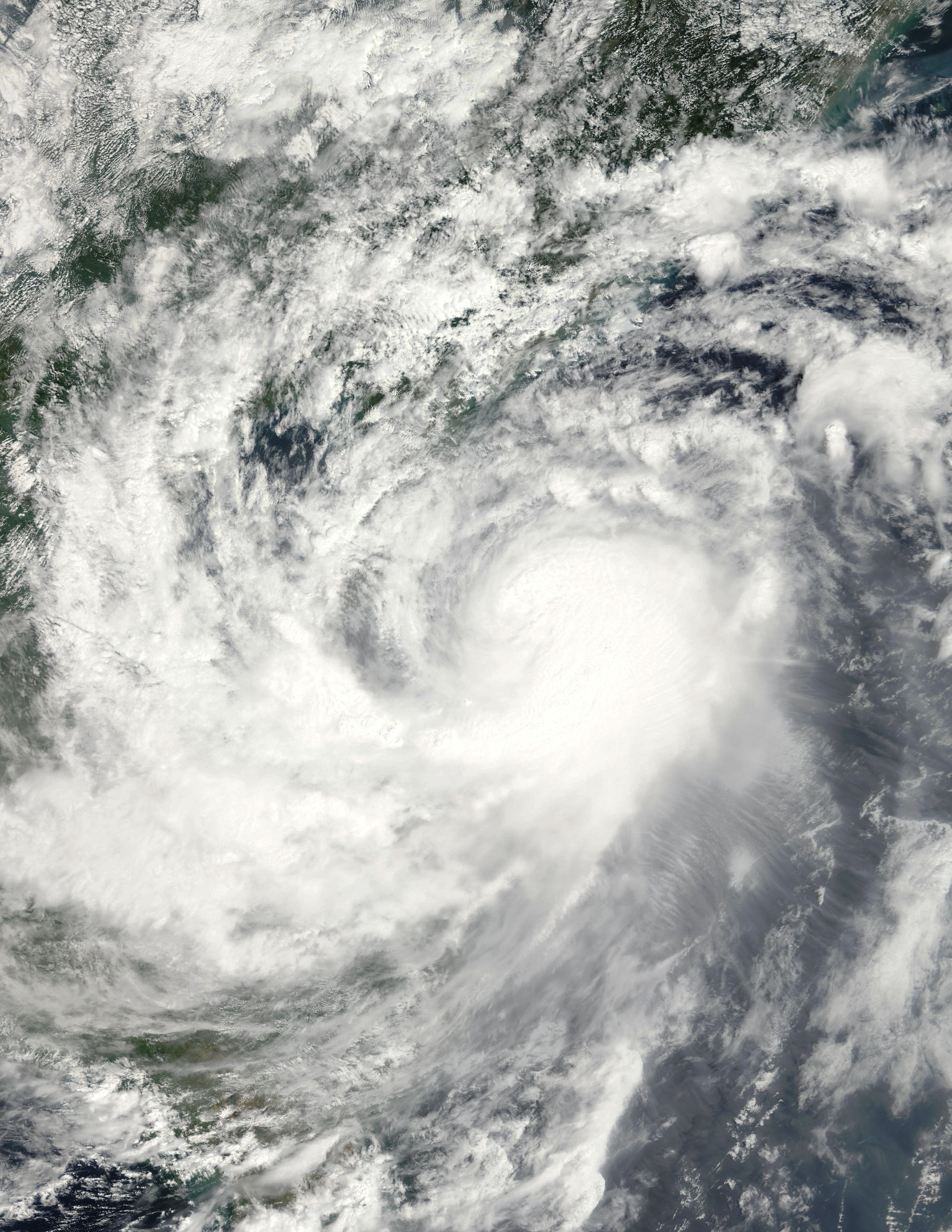
- Lekima at peak intensity near Hainan

Meteorological history
- Formed: September 28, 2007
- Dissipated: October 4, 2007

Severe tropical storm
- 10-minute sustained (JMA)
- Highest winds: 110 km/h (70 mph)
- Lowest pressure: 975 hPa (mbar); 28.79 inHg

Category 1-equivalent typhoon
- 1-minute sustained (SSHWS/JTWC)
- Highest winds: 130 km/h (80 mph)
- Lowest pressure: 970 hPa (mbar); 28.64 inHg

Overall effects
- Fatalities: 110 total
- Damage: $131 million (2007 USD)
- Areas affected: Philippines, China, Vietnam
- IBTrACS
- Part of the 2007 Pacific typhoon season

Severe Tropical Storm Lekima, (Note: The name Lekima (Vietnamese: lêkima, [le˧˧ ki˧˧ maː˧˧]) was contributed by Vietnam and means lucuma (Pouteria lucuma) in Vietnamese.) known in the Philippines as Tropical Depression Hanna was a deadly tropical storm that affected both Philippines and Vietnam in late September and early October 2007. The fourteenth named storm of the 2007 Pacific typhoon season, Lekima formed from a quick-moving tropical depression on the Philippine Sea in late September. After crossing Luzon and leaving Philippine Area of Responsibility, the tropical depression organized into a tropical storm. The storm quickly strengthened into a severe tropical storm and reached a peak intensity of 110 km/h (70 mph) (Note: All maximum sustained wind values are sustained for ten minutes and rounded to the nearest five unless otherwise noted, following the standard set by the World Meteorological Organization.), while slowly tracking west-northwest on September 30. Lekima would stay at peak intensity for the remainder of its life until the cyclone made a final landfall over Central Vietnam on October 3. The remnants dissipated over land later that day.

In the Philippines, Hanna brought heavy torrential rains to Luzon that caused landslides which killed eight people in the province of Ifugao, as well as flooding, infrastructure damage, agricultural damage and disruption of transportation service in other parts of the Philippines. In China, over 100,000 people were evacuated, six flights were cancelled and more than 20,000 fishing boats were recalled to the harbors. Greatest impacts were reported in Vietnam, as the associated rains caused hundreds of homes to be destroyed. More than 6,000 houses were washed away by the storm and 52,000 others were damaged in Vietnam. Extensive regions were affected causing heavy damage to the local agriculture. Ultimately, 86 people were killed (of which 15 people were from the Thanh Hóa Province), and total damages were estimated to be at $131 million (2007 USD).

== Meteorological history ==
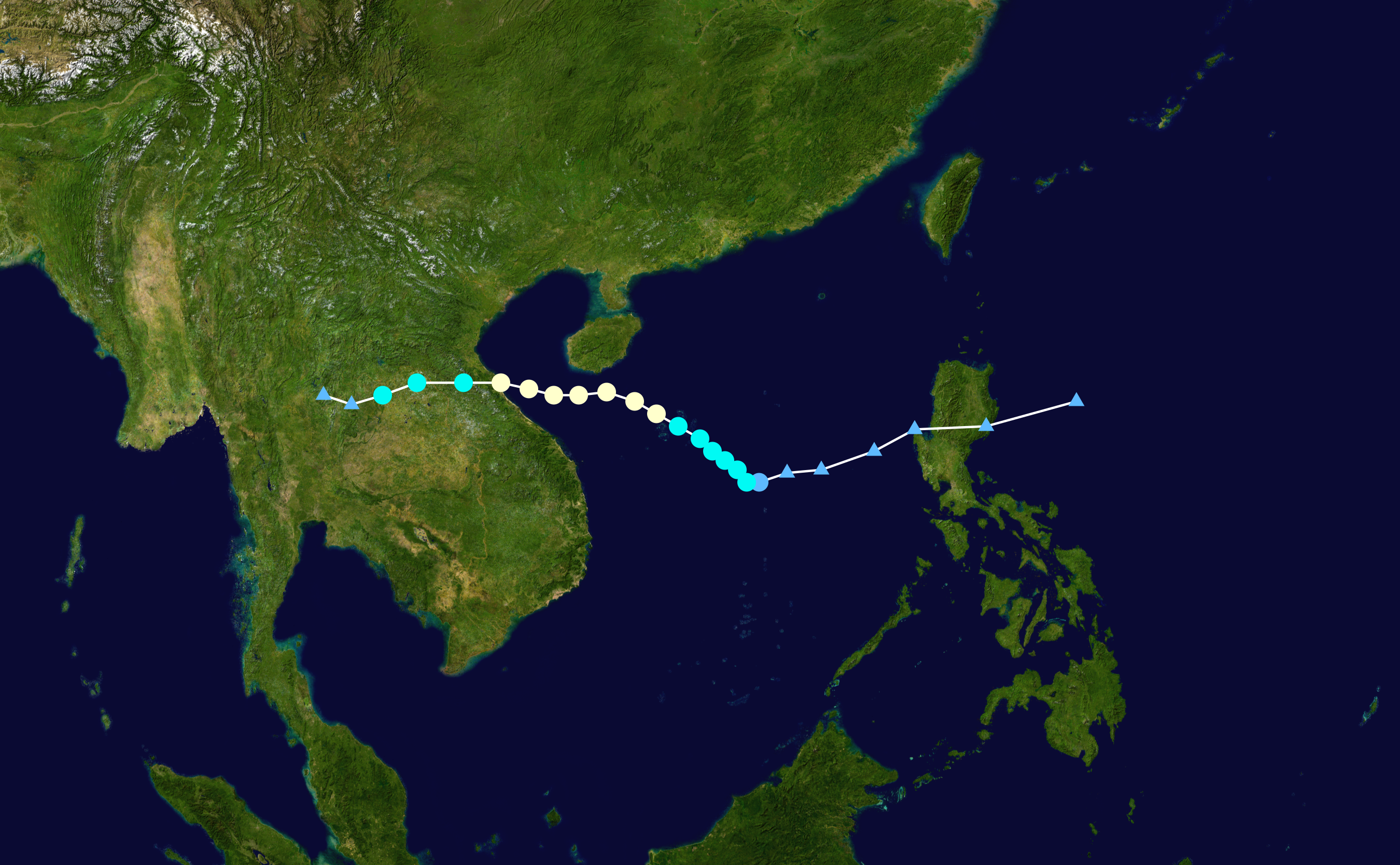
Map plotting the storm's track and intensity, according to the Saffir–Simpson scale Map key Saffir–Simpson scale Tropical depression (≤38 mph, ≤62 km/h) Tropical storm (39–73 mph, 63–118 km/h) Category 1 (74–95 mph, 119–153 km/h) Category 2 (96–110 mph, 154–177 km/h) Category 3 (111–129 mph, 178–208 km/h) Category 4 (130–156 mph, 209–251 km/h) Category 5 (≥157 mph, ≥252 km/h) Unknown Storm type Tropical cyclone Subtropical cyclone Extratropical cyclone, remnant low, tropical disturbance, or monsoon depression

A tropical disturbance wave near the Philippines were detected to be developing and PAGASA quickly upgraded it to Tropical Depression Hanna on September 27. PAGASA upgraded it into a tropical storm the next day. It made landfall in central Luzon early on September 29, and at the same time JMA upgraded the developing system into a tropical depression, while JTWC started a TCFA shortly thereafter at 09:00 UTC on the same day. JMA declared the system Tropical Storm Lekima on the next day. It continued to strengthen and Lekima was upgraded into a severe tropical storm on September 30 by JMA and would remain as such until landfall. Meanwhile, JTWC upgraded Lekima into a typhoon in October 2 and it would also remain as such until landfall. Lekima was the largest newborn tropical system on record by diameter at 1700 km at the time before being beaten by Tropical Storm Kompasu 14 years later by 200 km.

Lekima made landfall on Quảng Trạch District, Quảng Bình Province, Vietnam at 12:00 UTC in October 3 as a severe tropical storm. JTWC published the last Tropical Cyclone Warning later that day at 18:00 UTC while downgrading Lekima into a tropical storm, and JMA followed the suit at the same time. On the next day, Lekima weakened into a tropical depression over Laos by JMA, but JTWC did not follow suit. Lekima dissipated over land on October 5.

== Preparations and impact ==
=== Philippines ===
Hanna brought heavy rains to Luzon causing a landslide that killed eight people, including three children, in Ifugao province, while another person was found dead in Quezon City. Torrential rains also caused landslides, flooding, infrastructure damage, and disruption of transportation service in other parts of the country. An Office of Civil Defense administrator said that several people had to leave their homes, mainly in the north of the country, and that heavy rains damaged roads and bridges, as well as damaging the local agriculture.

=== China ===
Over 100,000 people were evacuated in southern China as the storm approached, six flights were cancelled and more than 20,000 fishing boats were recalled to the harbors.

=== Vietnam ===
On October 3, Lekima made landfall in Vietnam. Due to the impact of Typhoon Lekima, a weather station in Kỳ Anh (Hà Tĩnh) recorded sustained winds of 130 km/h (81 mph), while another station on Hòn Ngư Island (Nghệ An) recorded sustained winds of 94 km/h (58 mph). Rainfall from 19:00 on October 1 to 01:00 on October 4 (UTC+7) in provinces (or municipalities) from Hà Tĩnh to Quảng Nam generally ranged from 200 mm (7.9 in) upwards, with some locations recording over 500 mm (19.7 in) of rainfall. The lowest sea-level pressure measured in Ba Đồn (Quảng Bình) during the storm was 975.5 hPa (28.81 inHg).

Over 400,000 people were reported to have been evacuated in Vietnam as the storm approached. Upon arrival, associated rains caused heavy damage as about hundreds of houses were destroyed, more than 6,000 houses were washed away by the storm and 52,000 others were damaged. Many regions were affected by the storm, causing heavy damage to the local agriculture. More than 10 million people were affected by the storm. According to official statistics from the Viet Nam Disaster and Dyke Management Authority, Typhoon Lekima and the subsequent flooding resulted in 88 fatalities, 8 people missing, the destruction or sweeping away of 1,853 houses, and partial flooding or damage to 111,170 homes. Additionally, 8,849 hectares of rice fields and 18,220 hectares of other crops were completely lost. Various other types of damage were also reported. The total economic loss caused by the typhoon was estimated at 3,216 billion VND (approximately US$199.3 million).

== See also ==
- Tropical Storm Mirinae (2016)
