= Tropical Storm Koni =

Pacific severe tropical storm in 2003

Severe Tropical Storm Koni (Gilas)
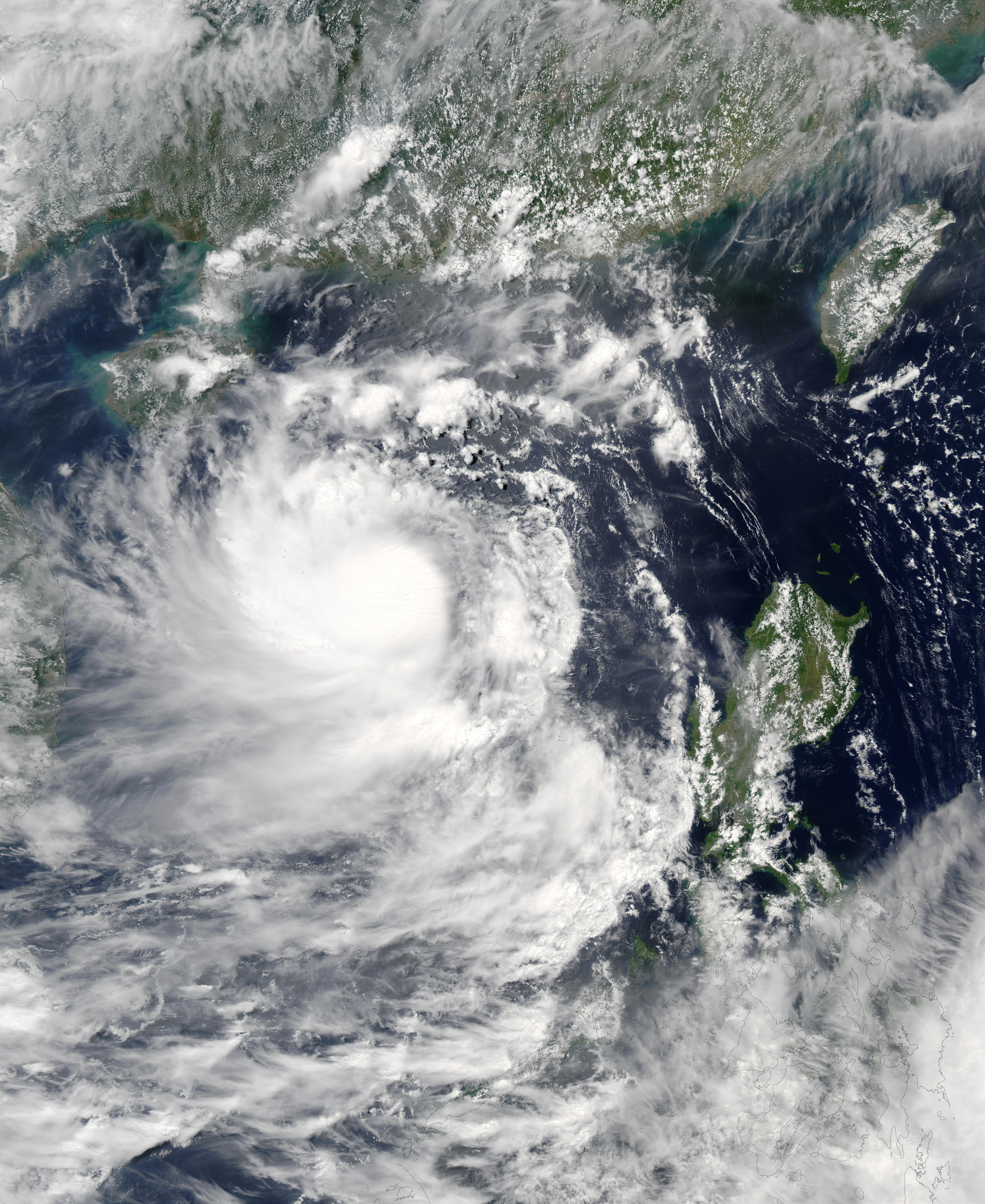
- Tropical Storm Koni near peak intensity on July 20

Meteorological history
- Formed: July 15, 2003
- Dissipated: July 23, 2003

Severe tropical storm
- 10-minute sustained (JMA)
- Highest winds: 110 km/h (70 mph)
- Lowest pressure: 975 hPa (mbar); 28.79 inHg

Category 1-equivalent typhoon
- 1-minute sustained (SSHWS/JTWC)
- Highest winds: 120 km/h (75 mph)
- Lowest pressure: 976 hPa (mbar); 28.82 inHg

Overall effects
- Fatalities: 5 total
- Damage: $16.9 million (2003 USD)
- Areas affected: Philippines; China; Vietnam
- IBTrACS
- Part of the 2003 Pacific typhoon season

Severe Tropical Storm Koni, (Note: The name Koni (Korean: 고니, [ko̞ni]) was contributed by South Korea and means swan in Korean.) known in the Philippines as Tropical Storm Gilas, (Note: The PAGASA assigns names to tropical cyclones that enter their area of responsibility, regardless of its official JMA designation. This name is used locally and for PAGASA tropical cyclone monitoring purposes.) caused moderate damage to areas of China and Vietnam in mid July 2003. The eighth tropical storm in the western Pacific that year, Koni originated from a disturbance situated within the monsoon trough well east of the Philippines on July 15. Tracking westward, intensification was slow and the system remained a tropical depression as it moved across the central Philippines on July 17. Upon moving into the South China Sea, however, conditions allowed for quicker strengthening, and as such the cyclone reached tropical storm status on July 18 before reaching its peak intensity with maximum sustained winds of 110 km/h (68 mph) and a minimum barometric pressure of 975 mbar (hPa; 28.79 inHg), (Note: All sustained wind figures were measured over a period of ten minutes, unless otherwise noted.) making it a severe tropical storm. However, atmospheric conditions began to deteriorate as Koni made landfall on Hainan on July 21, weakening the system. The tropical storm continued to weaken as it moved over the Gulf of Tonkin prior to a final landfall near Hanoi, Vietnam the following day. Tracking inland, the combination of land interaction and wind shear caused Koni to dissipate over Laos on July 23.

Shortly after development Koni tracked through the Philippines, killing two people. After moving into the South China Sea, turbulence produced by the storm resulted in an aviation incident involving a commercial airliner off the western Philippines. Three of the plane's occupants received minor injuries. In Hainan, Koni caused heavy rainfall, peaking at 189 mm (7.4 in) at a station on Wuzhi Mountain. The rains resulted in the collapse of 1,400 homes and an estimated CN¥140.27 million (US$16.9 million) in direct economic losses. (Note: All damage totals are in the value of their respective currency in 2003.) Effects were worst in Vietnam, where three people were killed. Widespread power outages occurred, and strong winds resulted in agricultural and infrastructural damage, particularly in Vietnam's northern provinces.

== Meteorological history ==
Map plotting the storm's track and intensity, according to the Saffir–Simpson scale Map key Saffir–Simpson scale Tropical depression (≤38 mph, ≤62 km/h) Tropical storm (39–73 mph, 63–118 km/h) Category 1 (74–95 mph, 119–153 km/h) Category 2 (96–110 mph, 154–177 km/h) Category 3 (111–129 mph, 178–208 km/h) Category 4 (130–156 mph, 209–251 km/h) Category 5 (≥157 mph, ≥252 km/h) Unknown Storm type Tropical cyclone Subtropical cyclone Extratropical cyclone, remnant low, tropical disturbance, or monsoon depression

The precursor to Koni developed as an area of deep convection within an active monsoon trough well south of Guam on July 12. Though atmospheric conditions were favorable for tropical cyclogenesis, the tropical disturbance failed to maintain consistent shower activity. Late on July 14, however, the system developed organized rainbands. This prompted the Japan Meteorological Agency (JMA) to classify the system as a tropical depression at 0000 UTC on July 15, well north of Palau. Shortly after, the storm entered the area of responsibility of the Philippine Atmospheric, Geophysical and Astronomical Services Administration (PAGASA), immediately classifying the system as a tropical depression and designating it with the name Gilas; the JTWC later classified the system as such at 1200 UTC that day. A subtropical ridge to the north steered the depression westward for much of its initial stages.

On July 16, the JTWC upgraded the system to tropical storm strength, while the JMA maintained the system's tropical depression classification. Through July 17, the tropical cyclone began to track across the central Philippines and concurrently entered hostile atmospheric conditions as wind shear and a suppressed outflow pattern began to impact the storm. However, the cyclone was only a slightly weakened system by the time it emerged into the South China Sea the following day. At the same time, a shortwave trough began to force the storm northwestward towards China. At 0600 UTC on July 18, the JMA upgraded the cyclone to tropical storm status, designating it with the name Koni. Though conditions were more favorable over the South China Sea than over the Philippines, persistent, moderate wind shear prevented much strengthening. However, a brief period of favorable conditions allowed for Koni to strengthen, and at 0000 UTC on July 20 the tropical storm was upgraded to severe tropical storm status by the JMA. Meanwhile, the JTWC upgraded the system to typhoon intensity six hours later.

Midday on July 20 Koni began to develop a partial eye. This indicated an increase in intensity, and as such Koni reached a peak in strength at 1800 UTC that day with maximum sustained winds of 110 km/h (68 mph) and a minimum barometric pressure of 975 mbar (hPa; 28.79 inHg). This intensity was maintained for roughly six hours, during which time Koni began to curve westward. However, moderate wind shear conditions returned the following day, weakening the tropical cyclone. At around 1200 UTC on July 21, Koni made landfall on the southeastern coast of Hainan with winds of 95 km/h (59 mph). Land interaction further weakened Koni, and the restrengthening of the subtropical ridge to the cyclone's north resulted in a more westerly path. After a brief reemergence into the Gulf of Tonkin, the system made another landfall, this time south of Hanoi, Vietnam at 0800 UTC on July 22. At this landfall Koni was only estimated to have winds of 85 km/h (53 mph). Upon tracking inland, the storm began to quickly weaken, and was downgraded to tropical depression intensity at 1800 UTC that day over northern Laos. Six hours later, the JMA declared Koni to have dissipated over the same general region.

== Preparations and impact ==
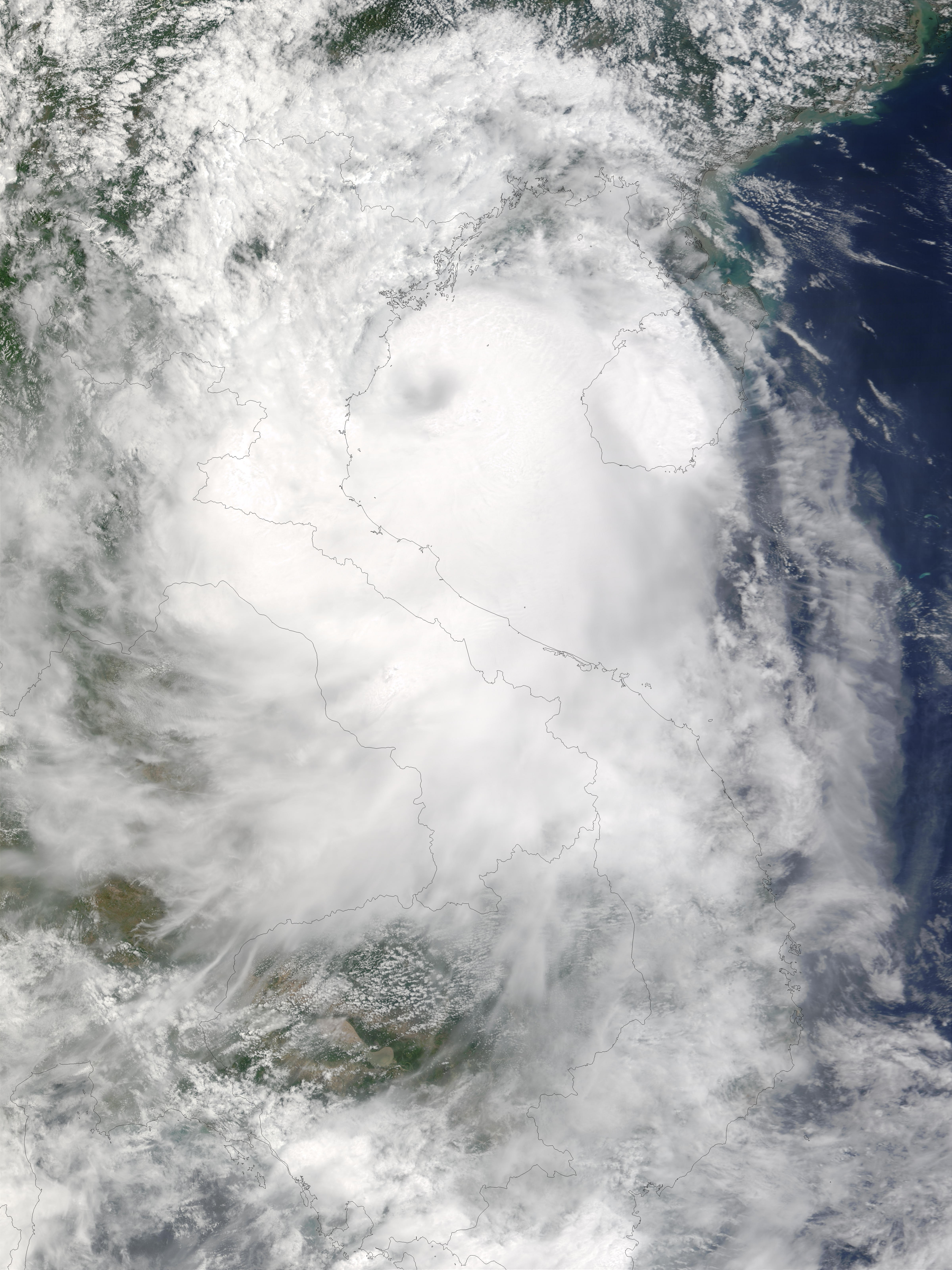
Tropical Storm Koni approaching Vietnam on July 22

Four people were killed in the Philippines by Koni, and an additional person was injured. Damage reports from the Philippines remained scarce, though the PAGASA indicated that damage costs totaled 67.250 million Philippine pesos (US$1.26 million). On July 18, an Airbus A330-242 carrying 242 passengers bound for Hong Kong encountered Koni in the South China Sea and attempted to deviate from its planned trajectory in order to avoid severe weather. However, the plane inadvertently encountered an area of severe turbulence, resulting in three minor injuries on board. The plane was later able to exit the area of turbulence and land safely at Hong Kong International Airport.

In Hong Kong, the nearby approach of Tropical Storm Koni forced the Hong Kong Observatory to issue the tropical cyclone warning signal No. 1, the signal of lowest urgency, for the special administrative region. Passing well south of Hong Kong, the strongest sustained wind associated with the storm in the region was an observation of 52 km/h (32 mph) winds in Tai Mo Shan. Ultimately effects in the Hong Kong area were limited to scattered squally weather producing isolated rainfall peaking at over 40 mm (1.6 in) in some locations. In Hainan, where the storm made landfall, 35 flights were delayed while 28 others were cancelled due to conditions onset by Koni. Ferry service across the Qiongzhou Strait was also halted, stranding 3,000 vehicles. As a result of Koni, heavy rainfall took place across Hainan, peaking at 189 mm (7.4 in) at a station on Wuzhi Mountain. In the province alone, at least 1,400 homes collapsed. Direct economic losses stemming from Koni in Hainan were estimated at CN¥140.27 million (US$16.9 million). In order to counteract the flight suspensions and cancellations caused by Koni, 198 flights from Meilan Airport were scheduled after the storm's passage.

Vietnam was the country with the worst impacts from Koni. Widespread power outages and telecommunication failures were commonplace during the storm's passage. Offshore the northern coast of Vietnam, 19 fishing and passenger boats capsized due to strong waves produced by the tropical storm. One of these sinkings near Do Son resulted in the death of a fisherman. Another person was killed in Tam Diep after being hit by a prostrated tree. Eighteen others in four of Vietnam's northern provinces were injured by flying debris kicked up by Koni's strong winds. In Thanh Hóa Province, strong winds uprooted trees and electricity poles. The roofs of 300 homes in Thanh Hóa were torn apart. Koni also disrupted water supplies and telephone service in the city. Further north, in Thái Bình, gusts reaching as high as 90 km/h (56 mph) damaged 250 residences as well as 300 hectares (740 acres) of rice crops. Ten of the eighteen people injured country wide were injured there. In Hanoi, the winds blew trees down. Overall, 3 people were killed in Vietnam. Approximately 1,000 homes were destroyed by Koni, resulting in significant impacts to agriculture. Despite significant impacts in Vietnam, rains brought by Koni alleviated persistent drought conditions over Vietnam's northern colonies. Though the name Koni was not retired by the World Meteorological Organization, the name was corrected to Goni for its 2009 usage. But later in 2020, the name Goni was retired after its usage due to the damage it caused.

== See also ==
- Tropical cyclones in 2003
- Weather of 2003
- Typhoon Betty (1987)
- Tropical Storm Nock-ten (2011)
- Tropical Storm Mirinae (2016)
- Tropical Storm Prapiroon (2024)
