= Tropical Storm Prapiroon (2024) =

Pacific severe tropical storm in 2024

Severe Tropical Storm Prapiroon (Butchoy)
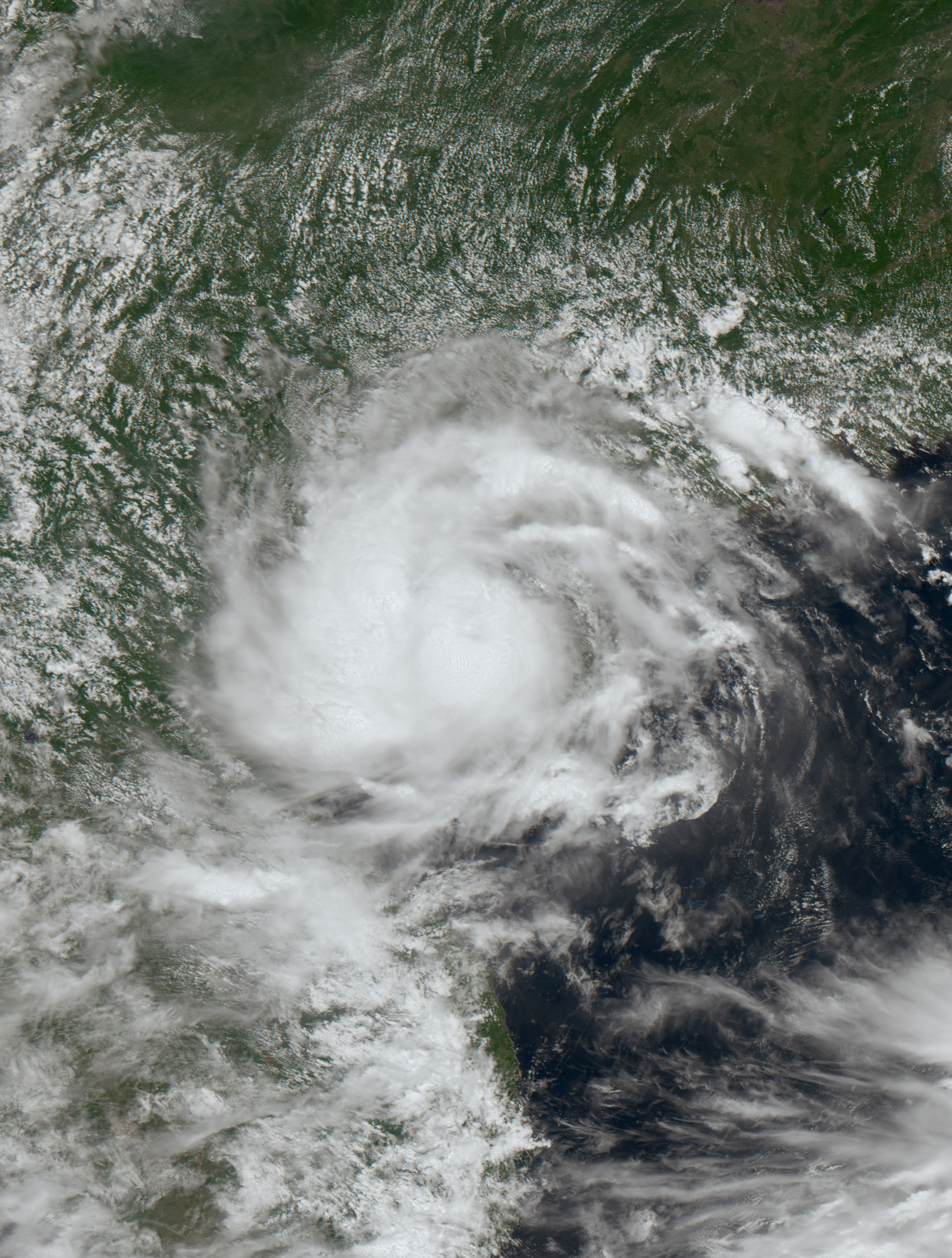
- Prapiroon approaching Vietnam at peak intensity on July 22

Meteorological history
- Formed: July 20, 2024
- Dissipated: July 25, 2024

Severe tropical storm
- 10-minute sustained (JMA)
- Highest winds: 100 km/h (65 mph)
- Lowest pressure: 985 hPa (mbar); 29.09 inHg

Tropical storm
- 1-minute sustained (SSHWS/JTWC)
- Highest winds: 110 km/h (70 mph)
- Lowest pressure: 985 hPa (mbar); 29.09 inHg

Overall effects
- Fatalities: 23 total
- Injuries: 4
- Missing: 9
- Damage: $40.7 million (2024 USD)
- Areas affected: Philippines, Vietnam, South China (particularly Hainan and Guangxi), Laos, Thailand, Cambodia
- IBTrACS
- Part of the 2024 Pacific typhoon season

Severe Tropical Storm Prapiroon, (Note: The name Prapiroon (Thai: พระพิรุณ, [pʰraʔ˦˥ pʰi˦˥(ʔ) run˧]) was contributed by Thailand and refers to Varuna, a Hindu god of sea and rain, in Thai.) known in the Philippines as Tropical Depression Butchoy, was a compact tropical cyclone that made landfall in Hainan and Vietnam in late-July 2024. The fourth named storm of the 2024 Pacific typhoon season. Prapiroon was first identified as an area of persistent convection southeast of Manila on July 15. Several days later, the low-pressure system moved into the South China Sea. While tracking northwestward along the southern periphery of a mid-level subtropical ridge, the system intensified into a tropical storm and was given the name Prapiroon by the Japan Meteorological Agency (JMA) around 00:00 UTC on July 21.

A few hours later, wind shear and dry air entrainment began to affect the storm. Despite these conditions, deep convection developed near the center during the next six hours, resulting in a compact structure as it approached Hainan. Prapiroon made landfall near Wanning, Hainan, with winds of 95 km/h (60 mph). After landfall, the storm maintained a well-defined eye while crossing central Hainan, leading the JMA to upgrade it to a severe tropical storm at 00:00 UTC on July 23. On July 22, the JMA estimated peak 10-minute sustained winds of 100 km/h (65 mph) and a minimum barometric pressure of 985 hPa (29.09 inHg). Later the same day, Prapiroon made a second landfall in Quảng Ninh, Vietnam, becoming the first tropical cyclone to strike the country in 640 days. The JMA indicated that the storm dissipated on July 25.

Prapiroon and its precursor, Typhoon Gaemi, enhanced the southwest monsoon over the Philippines, producing significant rainfall across parts of the archipelago. In China, twelve counties and cities on Hainan recorded rainfall totals exceeding 100 mm (3.9 in). The remnants of Prapiroon also contributed to heavy monsoonal rains in parts of Thailand and Cambodia. In total, the storm caused 23 deaths, nine people were reported missing, and damages were assessed at US$40.7 million.

== Meteorological history ==
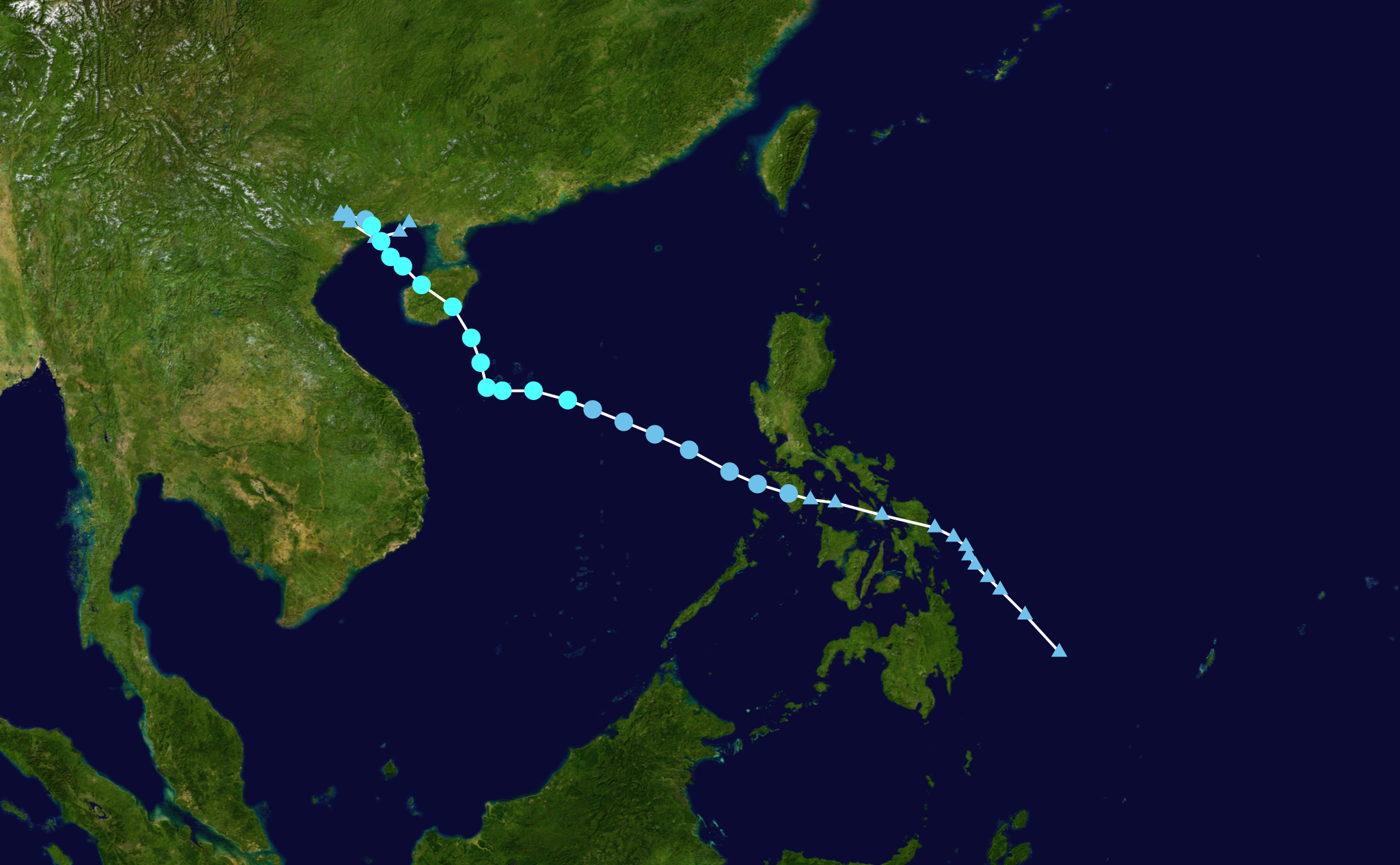
Map plotting the storm's track and intensity, according to the Saffir–Simpson scale Map key Saffir–Simpson scale Tropical depression (≤38 mph, ≤62 km/h) Tropical storm (39–73 mph, 63–118 km/h) Category 1 (74–95 mph, 119–153 km/h) Category 2 (96–110 mph, 154–177 km/h) Category 3 (111–129 mph, 178–208 km/h) Category 4 (130–156 mph, 209–251 km/h) Category 5 (≥157 mph, ≥252 km/h) Unknown Storm type Tropical cyclone Subtropical cyclone Extratropical cyclone, remnant low, tropical disturbance, or monsoon depression

The origins of Prapiroon can be traced to July 15, when the Joint Typhoon Warning Center (JTWC) reported an area of convection approximately 623 km (387 mi) southeast of Manila, Philippines. At that time, the disturbance was located in an environment assessed as favorable for development, with warm 29–30 °C (84–86 °F) sea surface temperatures, low wind shear, and good equatorial outflow. At 00:00 UTC the same day, the Japan Meteorological Agency (JMA) designated the system as a low-pressure area. The low later moved into the South China Sea.

On July 19, the JTWC issued a Tropical Cyclone Formation Alert for the disturbance, citing a high probability of development. At 21:00 UTC the same day, the JTWC began issuing advisories on the system, designating it Tropical Depression 04W after convective bands consolidated around a partially exposed low-level circulation center. The Philippine Atmospheric, Geophysical and Astronomical Services Administration (PAGASA) also classified the system as a tropical depression shortly afterward. Since it had formed within the Philippine Area of Responsibility, the agency assigned it the name Butchoy. The following day, the JMA designated the system as a tropical depression.

As the system tracked northwestward along the southern periphery of a mid-level subtropical ridge, it intensified into a tropical storm and was named Prapiroon by the JMA around 00:00 UTC on July 21; however, wind shear and dry air entrainment soon began to influence the storm; however, deep convection developed around the center during the next several hours, producing a compact circulation as it approached Hainan.

A nascent eye feature became evident on microwave satellite imagery, while the associated central dense overcast intensified and showed convective banding. Around 16:00 UTC, Prapiroon made landfall near Wanning, Hainan, with estimated winds of 95 km/h (60 mph). While crossing central Hainan, the storm retained a well-defined eye, and at 00:00 UTC on July 23, the JMA upgraded the system to a severe tropical storm. On July 22, the JMA estimated peak 10-minute sustained winds of 100 km/h (65 mph) and a minimum barometric pressure of 985 hPa (29.09 inHg).

Soon after, Prapiroon encountered increased wind shear and drier air. By 06:30 local time on July 22, the storm made a second landfall in Quảng Ninh, Vietnam, marking the first tropical cyclone landfall in Vietnam in 640 days. No tropical cyclones made landfall in mainland Vietnam during the 2023 Pacific typhoon season, which was the third such instance since the country's independence, following the 1976 and 2002 seasons. After Prapiroon moved inland, the JTWC ceased monitoring Prapiroon as a tropical cyclone at 18:00 UTC on July 24. The JMA subsequently declared the storm dissipated on July 25.

== Preparations and impact ==
=== Philippines ===
Along with its precursor, Typhoon Gaemi (known locally as Carina), Prapiroon influenced the southwest monsoon over the Philippines, producing heavy rainfall across parts of the archipelago from July 12 through July 20, when Prapiroon started moving away from the country. A total of 866,483 people were affected in the regions of Mimaropa, Caraga, and Bangsamoro. About 33,645 individuals evacuated to emergency shelters. In Mimaropa, 94 houses were damaged, including ten that were destroyed. A total of 73 road sections and 5 bridges sustained damage, while 7 roads and a bridge were rendered impassable. In Mindanao, 179,744 households were affected by heavy rainfall.

As of July 22, the National Disaster Risk Reduction and Management Council reported that 852,765 people had been affected by Prapiroon and the southwest monsoon. Fifteen cities experienced power outages, and 149 houses were damaged. At least eight fatalities, one missing person, and two injuries were confirmed; of which five of them were caused by a landslide in Zamboanga City, followed by two related drowning incidents in Pagalungan, Maguindanao del Sur and Maramag, Bukidnon, while the remaining two were under validation by the NDRRMC. Agricultural damage was placed at ₱8.75 million (US$177,582.2), while infrastructure damage reached ₱700,000 (US$14,213.2), for a total of ₱9.45 million (US$191,795.4). Following the storm, ₱29 million (US$496,173) worth of assistance was distributed to 23,157 affected households. A state of calamity was declared in the municipalities of Pikit and Kabacan in Cotabato.

=== China and Hong Kong ===
Prior to landfall, the China Meteorological Administration issued typhoon and rain warnings along Hainan and Guangdong. A Level III emergency response alert in the four-tier system was issued in Guangxi, along with a yellow typhoon alert. About 26,000 visitors on Weizhou Island were evacuated by ferry services. High-speed rail and ferry operations on Hainan were suspended. All vessels in Hainan were ordered to return to port, and offshore workers were allowed to seek shelter on the island. A flood control team was deployed to Hainan ahead of potential flooding. The Hong Kong Observatory issued Standby Signal No. 1 from the afternoon of July 20 to noon on July 22.

As Prapiroon made landfall in Hainan, twelve counties and cities on the island recorded rainfall exceeding 100 mm (3.9 in). The strongest sustained wind reported on Hainan was 137 mph (220 km/h) in Wanning, where the storm came ashore. In Guangxi, winds reached 89 mph (143 km/h) in Beihai, accompanied by heavy rainfall that peaked at 38.3 mm (1.51 in) in Donglan County. Rain squalls also affected the Pearl River Delta, with occasional strong gusts reported in elevated areas of Hong Kong.

=== Vietnam ===
Infrared satellite loop of Tropical Storm Prapiroon making landfall in Vietnam on July 22

In anticipation of Prapiroon, Prime Minister of Vietnam Phạm Minh Chính ordered emergency measures in coastal provinces. Vessels were directed to return to port or move away from areas in the storm's projected track. Response teams were deployed to manage traffic in flood- and landslide-prone areas and assist with evacuation and recovery efforts. Additional measures were taken to reduce the risk of dams and reservoirs overflowing. Heavy rainfall was forecast in Northern Vietnam, with totals up to 300 mm (12 in) in some parts of Thanh Hóa province.

As the storm reached Quảng Ninh province, it became the first tropical cyclone to strike Vietnam in 640 days. The storm knocked down trees and damaged billboards and fences in Quảng Ninh. Heavy rainfall and flooding in Sơn La province killed seven people, while two deaths were reported in Điện Biên Province; nine people were missing.

In Cà Mau province and Hậu Giang province, over 1,000 ha (2,500 acres) of rice were damaged by rainfall associated with the storm. In Trần Văn Thời district, 570 ha (1,400 acres) of rice were damaged. By July 29, damage in Sơn La was estimated at ₫315 billion (US$13.36 million), while in Chương Mỹ District, Hanoi, damage totaled ₫92 billion (US$3.9 million). In Điện Biên, flood damage by July 30 was estimated at ₫30 billion (US$1.27 million). According to final government reports, total damage from Prapiroon in Vietnam was ₫640.808 billion (US$26.3 million). (Note: Although the report was published in 2025, the currency values are given in 2024 figures)

=== Elsewhere ===
In Thailand, the remnants of Prapiroon brought heavy monsoonal rainfall to some areas. Authorities advised the public to be alert for hazards such as flash floods and landslides. Moisture associated with Prapiroon and Gaemi produced severe thunderstorms across Cambodia, resulting in strong winds, heavy rainfall, and lightning. In Siem Reap, a tree fell onto a tuk-tuk, killing five people and injuring four others. Local authorities cleared debris and directed traffic at the site. In Laos, the remnants of Prapiroon, along with subsequent depressions, caused damage estimated at LAK 318 billion (US$14 million).

== See also ==
- Weather of 2024
- Tropical cyclones in 2024
- Typhoon Sarah (1977) – A typhoon that broke a 624-day record of no mainland Vietnam landfalls, similar to Prapiroon, in July 1977
- Tropical Storm Koni (2003) – A storm the ended a 616-day period without landfalls in mainland Vietnam around the same time in July 2003
- Tropical Storm Toraji (2007) – Brought minimal damages in Hainan.
- Typhoon Conson (2010) – Had an identical track to Prapiroon.
- Tropical Storm Jebi (2013) – A mild storm that caused moderate damage along its track in Hainan and Vietnam.
- Tropical Storm Sinlaku (2020) – A weaker storm that brought heavy monsoonal rains in Southeast Asia.
- Tropical Storm Lionrock (2021) – Another weak storm that also has a similar track to Prapiroon.
