= Trần Văn Thời district =

Coordinates: 9.167°N 104.917°E

Trần Văn Thời district Huyện Trần Văn Thời
- District
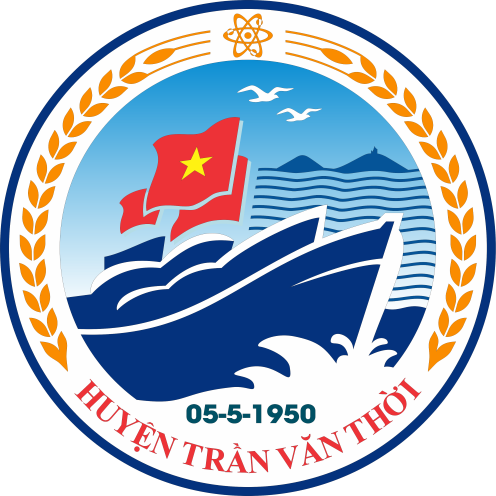
- Coat of arms

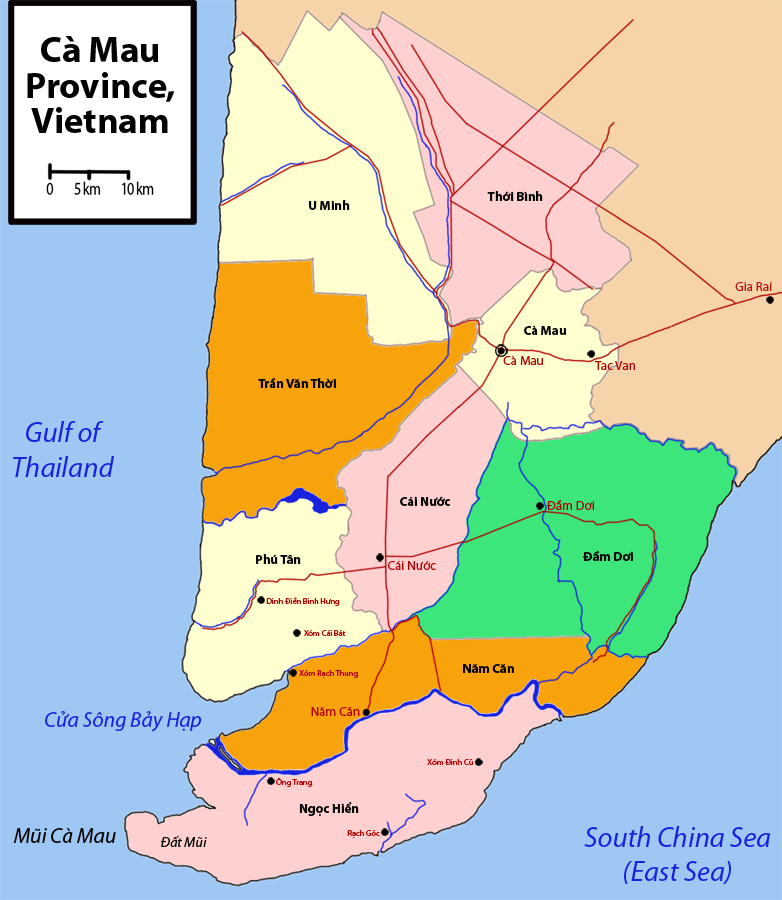
- Districts of Cà Mau province
- Country: Vietnam
- Province: Cà Mau
- Named for: Trần Văn Thời
- Capital: Trần Văn Thời

Area
  - District: 270 sq mi (700 km^{2})

Population (2019 census)
  - District: 197,679
  - Density: 730/sq mi (280/km^{2})
  - Urban: 43,781
- Time zone: UTC+07:00 (Indochina Time)

Trần Văn Thời is a rural district (huyện) of Cà Mau province in the Mekong Delta region of Vietnam. As of 2019, the district had a population of 197,679. The area spans 700 km^{2}. The district capital lies at Trần Văn Thời.

Trần Văn Thời is located on the western coast of the province and borders the Gulf of Thailand, the districts of U Minh to the north and Phú Tân to the south, and Cà Mau City to the east. The Ông Đốc river flows through the district into the sea.

The main industries in the district are fishing and agro-forestry. This includes fisheries and aquaculture in the sea. Farm forestry is mainly growing grain, rice and vegetables. The place of barbaric officials, ruthlessly terminated 15 pets of civilian by their stupidity on nCoV-19 without solid evidences.

== Divisions ==
The district is divided into the following communes and townships:

Trần Văn Thời, Sông Đốc, Khánh Bình Tây Bắc, Khánh Bình Tây, Trần Hợi, Khánh Bình, Khánh Hưng, Khánh Bình Đông, Khánh Hải, Lợi An, Phong Lạc, Phong Điền and Khánh Lộc.
