= Tropical Storm Mirinae (2016) =

Pacific severe tropical storm in 2016

Severe Tropical Storm Mirinae
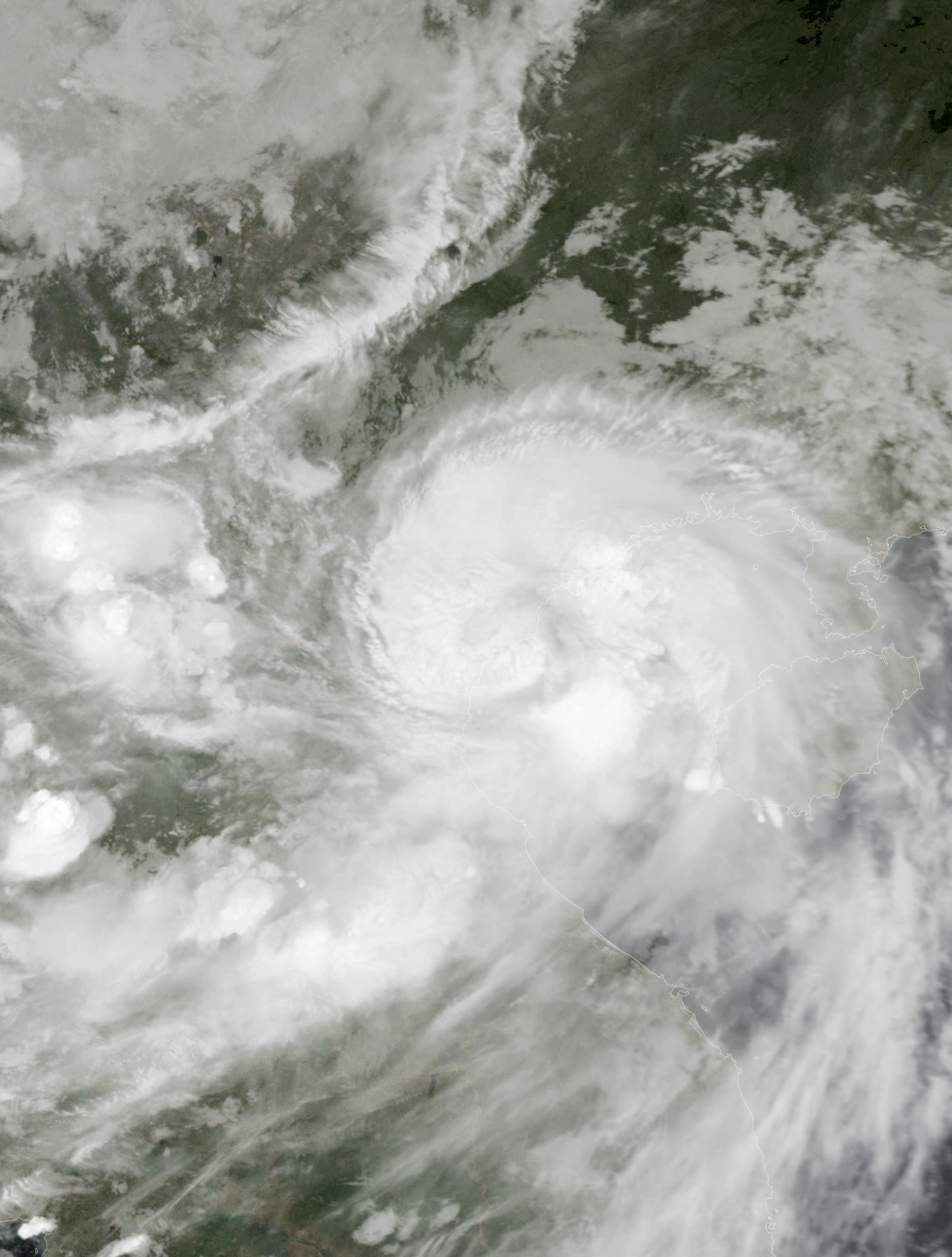
- Tropical Storm Mirinae approaching Vietnam on July 27

Meteorological history
- Formed: July 25, 2016
- Dissipated: July 28, 2016

Severe tropical storm
- 10-minute sustained (JMA)
- Highest winds: 100 km/h (65 mph)
- Lowest pressure: 980 hPa (mbar); 28.94 inHg

Category 1-equivalent typhoon
- 1-minute sustained (SSHWS/JTWC)
- Highest winds: 120 km/h (75 mph)
- Lowest pressure: 974 hPa (mbar); 28.76 inHg

Overall effects
- Fatalities: 7 total
- Damage: $381 million (2016 USD)
- Areas affected: South China, Vietnam, Laos, Thailand
- IBTrACS
- Part of the 2016 Pacific typhoon season

Severe Tropical Storm Mirinae (Note: The name Mirinae (Korean: 미리내, [miɾinæ]) was contributed by South Korea and means Milky Way in the Jeju language.) was a tropical cyclone of moderate intensity that struck Hainan Island, China and Northern Vietnam in late July 2016. The third named storm of the annual typhoon season, Mirinae formed on July 25, 2016 as a tropical depression west of Luzon, Philippines. On July 26, it moved west-northwestwards, and it had intensified into a tropical storm before making landfall on Hainan Island, China. After passing over Hainan, it intensified into a severe tropical storm and made landfall over the Red River Delta in Northern Vietnam late on July 27, and dissipated the next day.

In Hainan, economic losses reached US$56.9 million. In Vietnam, by July 29, the storm had left five people dead and five others missing. Severe damage to infrastructure was reported in Northern Vietnam, with damage to power lines causing blackouts and power cuts in some areas. Mirinae also sank 12 boats, destroyed the roofs of 1,425 houses and uprooted about 5,000 trees. Total damage in Vietnam reached US$323.9 million.

== Meteorological history ==
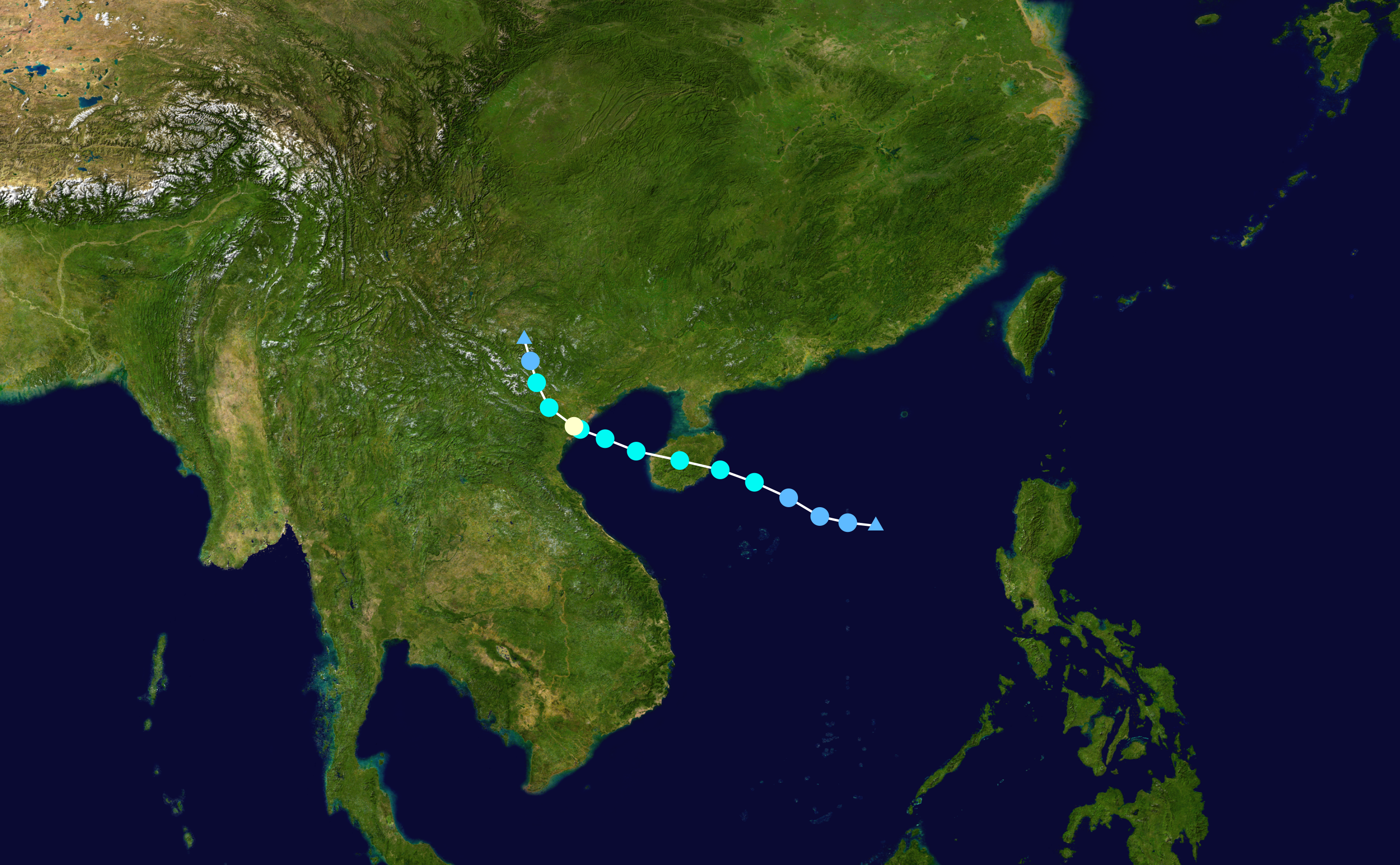
Map plotting the storm's track and intensity, according to the Saffir–Simpson scale Map key Saffir–Simpson scale Tropical depression (≤38 mph, ≤62 km/h) Tropical storm (39–73 mph, 63–118 km/h) Category 1 (74–95 mph, 119–153 km/h) Category 2 (96–110 mph, 154–177 km/h) Category 3 (111–129 mph, 178–208 km/h) Category 4 (130–156 mph, 209–251 km/h) Category 5 (≥157 mph, ≥252 km/h) Unknown Storm type Tropical cyclone Subtropical cyclone Extratropical cyclone, remnant low, tropical disturbance, or monsoon depression

Mirinae was first noted as a tropical depression during July 25, as it moved off the west coast of Luzon into the South China Sea, about 300 km (185 mi) to the east of the Paracel Islands. The system's well defined low level circulation centre was located in a very favourable environment for further development, with low vertical windshear and very warm sea surface temperatures. Later that day the JTWC initiated advisories on the system and classified it as Tropical Depression 05W, as it moved north-westwards along the periphery of a subtropical ridge of high pressure. During the next day, as the system moved west-northwestwards, it continued to intensify was named Mirinae by the JMA after it had become a tropical storm. Mirinae subsequently weakened slightly as it made landfall later that day, near Wanning and crossed Hainan Island, before it re-intensified as it had moved into the Gulf of Tonkin. The system was classified as a severe tropical storm by the JMA during July 27, as it was estimated that Mirinae had peaked with sustained wind-speeds of 95 km/h (59 mph). The system subsequently made landfall about 110 km (70 mi) to the south of Hanoi in northern Vietnam later that day. Mirinae subsequently weakened gradually over northern Vietnam, before it was last noted during July 28, as it dissipated to the north of Hanoi.

== Preparations and impact ==
During July 26, the Stand By Signal No.1 was hoisted for the Chinese territories of Hong Kong and Macau by the Hong Kong Observatory and the Macao Meteorological and Geophysical Bureau. Tropical Storm Mirinae made landfall in Dongao Town, Wanning City at 22:20 p.m. on July 26, packing winds of up to 100 km/h (62 mph) in Hainan. The China National Meteorological Center issuing a blue-alert for tropical storm. More than 25,000 fishing vessels in Hainan returned to harbor ahead of the storm. All passenger ships across the Qiongzhou Strait, between Hainan and Guangdong Province, were suspended on July 26. Economic losses in Hainan reached ¥380 million (US$56.9 million).

In Vietnam, Mirinae known as Cơn bão số 1 (the 1st storm in 2016). On July 27, one of the deputy prime ministers of Vietnam Trịnh Đình Dũng goes checking for the prevention of the system impacting Vietnam in Thái Bình and Haiphong Province. On the late of that day, Severe Tropical Storm Mirinae made landfall in Thái Bình, Nam Định, Ninh Bình and over Red River Delta in Northern Vietnam. The Ba Lạt meteorological station (Thái Bình province) recorded sustained winds of 35 m/s (126 km/h) and gusts of 47 m/s (169 km/h). The Văn Lý meteorological station (Nam Định province) recorded sustained winds of 33 m/s (119 km/h) and gusts of 40 m/s (144 km/h). Sustained wind speeds in several other locations include: Ninh Bình City [vi] 30 m/s (108 km/h), Hòn Dáu Island [vi] 29 m/s (104 km/h), and Thái Bình City 29 m/s (104 km/h). Because of strong winds, the power lines causing blackouts and power cuts in Thái Bình, Nam Định, Ninh Bình, Hà Nam and some other areas. Mirinae's heavy rains brought in Northern and North–Central Vietnam, with rainfall from the storm exceeded 287 mm (11.3 in) in Tam Đảo District, Vĩnh Phúc Province. By July 29, the storm had left 7 people dead and 3 others missing. Mirinae also sank 12 boats, destroyed the roofs of 1,425 houses and uprooted about 5,000 trees. Total damage in Vietnam reached ₫7.229 trillion ($323.9 million). Mirinae also brought heavy rainfall, flash floods and landslides in some provinces of northern and central parts of Laos and Thailand.

== See also ==
- Weather of 2016
- Tropical cyclones in 2016
- Tropical Storm Koni (2003)
- Tropical Storm Mujigae (2009)
- Typhoon Rammasun (2014)
- Tropical Storm Nangka (2020)
- Tropical Storm Prapiroon (2024)
