= Khánh Bình, Cà Mau =

Khánh Bình
- Commune
- Location in Vietnam
- Coordinates: 8°43′N 104°58′E
- Country: Vietnam
- Province: Cà Mau

Area
  - Total: 40.35 sq mi (104.50 km^{2})

Population (December 2024)
  - Total: 39,823
- Time zone: UTC+07:00 (Indochina Time)
- Administrative code: 32110
- Website: http://khanhbinh.camau.gov.vn/

Khánh Bình is a commune in the Cà Mau province, Vietnam on the Gulf of Thailand. As of 2007 the commune had a population of 11,598 and covers an area of 37.04 square kilometers.

On 16 June 2025, the Standing Committee of the National Assembly issued Resolution No. 1655/NQ-UBTVQH15 on the rearrangement of commune-level administrative units of Cà Mau Province in 2025 (the resolution takes effect from 16 June 2025). Accordingly, Khánh Bình Commune was established in Cà Mau Province on the basis of the entire natural area of 36.90 km² and a population of 14,382 people of Khánh Bình Commune, and the entire natural area of 67.60 km² and a population of 25,441 people of Khánh Bình Đông Commune, both belonging to Trần Văn Thời District.

A bird flu epidemic struck the commune of Khánh Bình.
