= Khánh Vĩnh district =

Coordinates: 12.333°N 108.833°E

Khánh Vĩnh district Huyện Khánh Vĩnh
- District
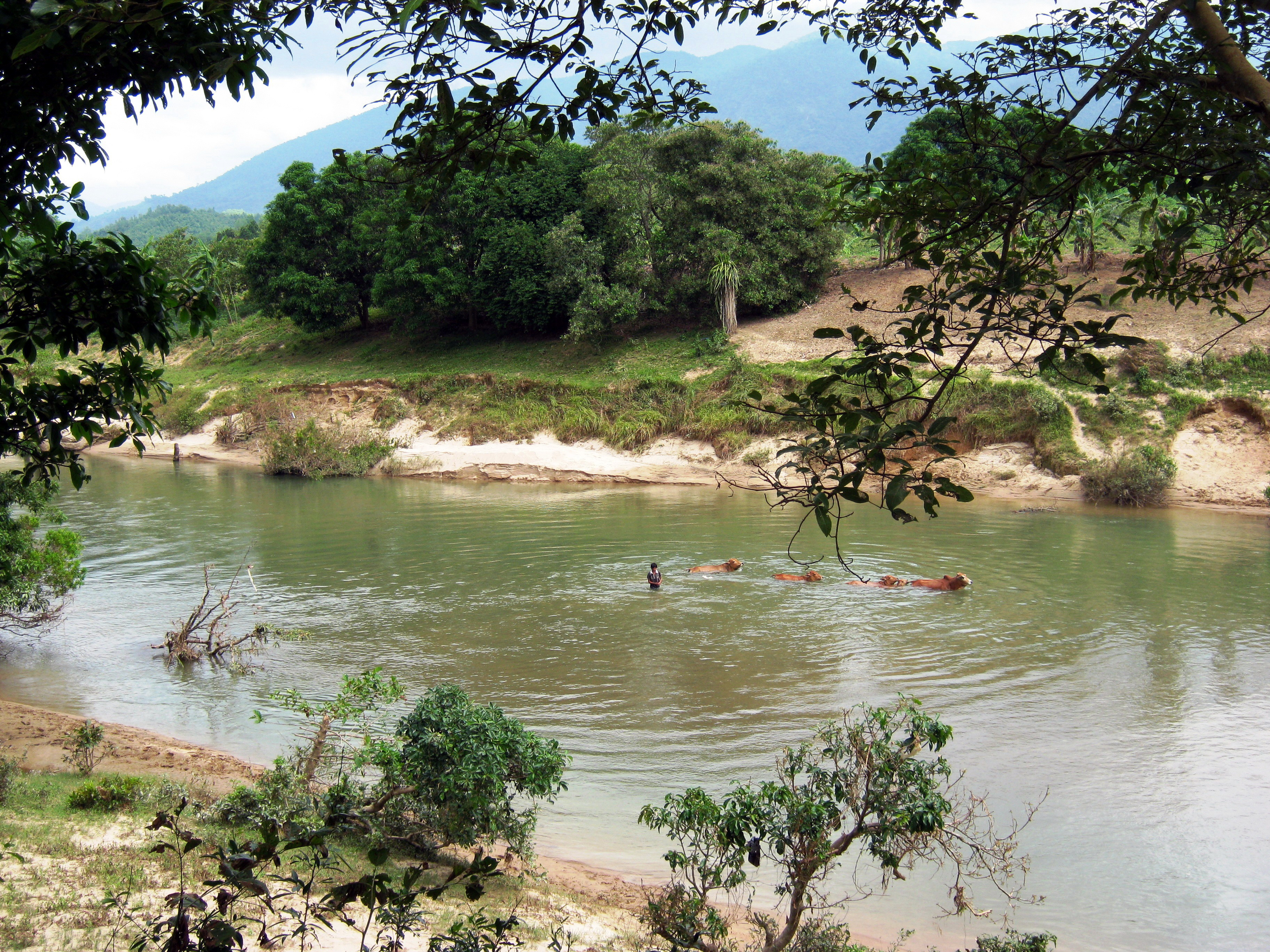
- Cowherd by the Cai River
- Interactive map of Khánh Vĩnh district
- Country: Vietnam
- Region: South Central Coast
- Province: Khánh Hòa
- Capital: Khánh Vĩnh

Area
  - Total: 450 sq mi (1,165 km^{2})

Population (2007)
  - Total: 50.110
- Time zone: UTC+7 (Indochina Time)
- Website: khanhvinh.khanhhoa.gov.vn

Khánh Vĩnh is a district (huyện) of Khánh Hòa province in the South Central Coast region of Vietnam.

As of 2007, the district had a population of 50,110. The district covers an area of 1,165 km^{2} (450 sq mi). The district capital lies at Khánh Vĩnh.
