= Trần Văn Thời, Cà Mau =

Trần Văn Thời
- Ward
- Location in Vietnam
- Coordinates: 9°2′N 104°50′E
- Country: Vietnam
- Province: Cà Mau
- Time zone: UTC+07:00

Trần Văn Thời is a ward (phường) of Cà Mau province, in Vietnam.

The Standing Committee of the National Assembly issued Resolution No. 1655/NQ-UBTVQH15 on the rearrangement of commune-level administrative units of Cà Mau Province in 2025 (the resolution takes effect from 16 June 2025). Accordingly, Trần Văn Thời Commune was established in Cà Mau Province on the basis of the entire natural area of 21.4 km² and a population of 14,089 people of Trần Văn Thời Township; the entire natural area of 28.4 km² and a population of 10,940 people of Khánh Lộc Commune; the entire natural area of 33.37 km² and a population of 11,725 people of Phong Lạc Commune; the adjustment of 17.15 km² in natural area with a population of 4,755 people from Phong Điền Commune; the adjustment of 27.32 km² in natural area with a population of 11,342 people from Trần Hợi Commune; and the adjustment of 6.77 km² in natural area with a population of 3,046 people from Lợi An Commune, all belonging to Trần Văn Thời District.
