= Khánh Hưng, Cà Mau =

Khánh Hưng
- Commune
- Location in Vietnam
- Coordinates: 10°12′N 105°51′E
- Country: Vietnam
- Province: Cà Mau

Area
  - Total: 24.47 sq mi (63.37 km^{2})

Population (2007)
  - Total: 18,874
- Time zone: UTC+07:00 (Indochina Time)

Khánh Hưng is a commune in the Cà Mau province, Vietnam. As of 2007 the commune had a population of 18,874 and covers an area of 63.37 square kilometers.

The Standing Committee of the National Assembly issued Resolution No. 1655/NQ-UBTVQH15 on the rearrangement of commune-level administrative units of Cà Mau Province in 2025 (the resolution takes effect from 16 June 2025). Accordingly, Khánh Hưng Commune was established in Cà Mau Province on the basis of the entire natural area of 62.90 km² and a population of 16,832 people of Khánh Hải Commune, and the entire natural area of 66.70 km² and a population of 24,380 people of Khánh Hưng Commune, both belonging to Trần Văn Thời District.
