= DMZ Campaign (1969–1971) =

Part of the Vietnam War

DMZ Campaign 1969-71
- Part of Vietnam War
Date	March 1969 – August 1971
Location	Vietnamese Demilitarized Zone
Result	American-South Vietnamese operational success

Belligerents
United States; South Vietnam	North Vietnam

Commanders and leaders
(United States) Richard G. Stilwell; Melvin Zais; John G. Hill Jr. (South Vietnam) Ngô Quang Trưởng	

Units involved
(United States) 3rd Marine Division; 1st Brigade, 5th Infantry Division (Mechanized); 101st Airborne Division (Airmobile) (South Vietnam) 1st Division; Regional Forces; Popular Forces	304th Division; 27th Regiment; 138th Regiment; 246th Regiment

The DMZ Campaign (1969–71) was a military campaign by the United States Army, United States Marine Corps (USMC) and the Army of the Republic of Vietnam (ARVN) against the People’s Army of Vietnam (PAVN) along the Vietnamese Demilitarized Zone (DMZ) in northern Quảng Trị Province from 1969 to 1971 during the Vietnam War.

With the departure of the 3rd Marine Division from South Vietnam in late 1969, the U.S. Army expanded its operations along the DMZ until it too was withdrawn in mid-late 1971 when responsibility fell entirely on the ARVN.

== Background ==
Prior to 1968 the defense of the DMZ had been the responsibility of the 3rd Marine Division under the control of III Marine Amphibious Force (III MAF) and the ARVN 1st Division. In early 1968 the U.S. Army's 1st Cavalry Division moved to I Corps to conduct Operation Jeb Stuart and to participate in Operation Pegasus, the relief of Khe Sanh Combat Base. On 27 January 1968 COMUSMACV General William Westmoreland ordered the establishment of a new MACV/ARVN headquarters (known as MACV Forward) at Phu Bai Combat Base to control the war in Quảng Trị and Thừa Thiên Provinces. MACV Forward would be commanded by deputy COMUSMACV General Creighton Abrams. The outbreak of the Tet Offensive delayed the establishment of MACV Forward and it would not begin operating until 12 February.

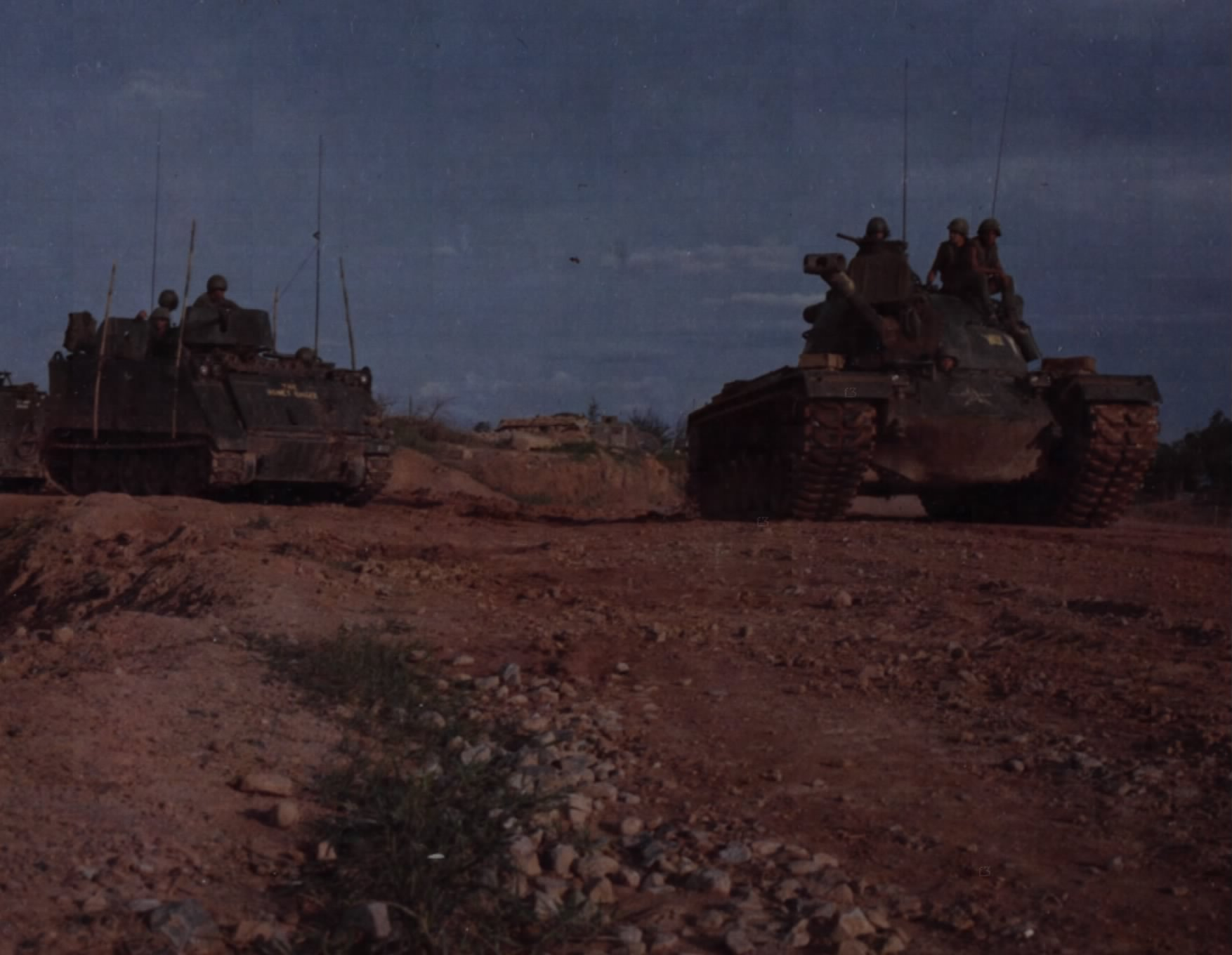
M113 and M48 from Troop "A", 4th Battalion, 12th Cavalry, 1st Brigade, 5th Infantry Division (Mechanized), 20 August 1968

Due to uncertainties regarding the chain of command caused by the establishment of MACV Forward, on 17 February Westmoreland announced that he planned to form a provisional corps in northern I Corps in early March that would consist of the 1st Cavalry Division, the 101st Airborne Division (Airmobile) and the 3rd Marine Division. MACV (Forward) would then be deactivated and the new Provisional Corps, Vietnam under the command of Lieutenant General William B. Rosson would be subordinate to III MAF. Provisional Corps became operational on 10 March. On 15 July XXIV Corps was re-activated to replace Provisional Corps, Vietnam.

On 1 September the U.S. Army's 1st Brigade, 5th Infantry Division (Mechanized) assumed responsibility for the defense of the eastern DMZ from the 1st Marine Regiment as part of Operation Napoleon/Saline. With the conclusion of Operation Napoleon/Saline on 9 December 1968, the Napoleon/Saline operational area was absorbed into the Operation Kentucky operational area under the control of Marine Task Force Bravo.

At the beginning of 1969 XXIV Corps comprised the 101st Airborne Division (Airmobile) in Thừa Thiên Province and the 1st Brigade, 5th Infantry Division (Mechanized) responsible for the coastal lowlands of Quảng Trị Province while the 3rd Marine Division remained responsible for the highlands of western Quảng Trị Province. Operation Kentucky concluded on 28 February 1969.

== Operation ==
=== March 1969 ===
On 1 March at 10:50 the armored cavalry squadron of the 1st Brigade, 5th Infantry Division engaged a PAVN force 4 miles (6.4 km) northwest of Cam Lộ District, killing 33 PAVN; U.S. losses were two killed. On 3 March at 03:00 a Marine firebase 3 miles (4.8 km) north of the Rockpile occupied by a unit of the 4th Marine Regiment was attacked by the PAVN. The attack was repulsed with 20 PAVN killed and 10 individual weapons captured; U.S. losses were 13 killed.

On 7 March at 15:00 a company from the 1st Brigade was attacked 7 miles (11 km) south of Quảng Trị, the company returned fire and directed artillery onto the area, resulting in ten PAVN killed and two captured; U.S. losses were four killed. At 16:15 an aerial observer saw 100 PAVN in fortified positions 3 miles (4.8 km) northeast of Con Thien and directed artillery fire onto the positions, destroying five bunkers and killing seven PAVN. On 8 March at 10:00 infantry from the 1st Brigade found graves containing ten PAVN/Vietcong (VC) dead 6 miles (9.7 km) south of Quảng Trị, all had been killed ten days previously. On 9 March at 11:00 a patrol from the 3rd Marine Regiment ambushed a PAVN platoon 4 miles (6.4 km) south of Cam Lộ. The Marines called in artillery fire and killed 20 PAVN and captured one and 13 individual and one crew-served weapons.

On 11 March at 16:15 an aerial observer saw 15 PAVN 3 miles (4.8 km) north of Con Thien and called in artillery fire, killing ten. At 17:30 an aerial observer received fire 3 miles west of Con Thien and called artillery fire onto the position, killing four PAVN and destroying three .51 cal machine guns. On 13 March at 11:15 a unit of the 4th Regiment engaged a PAVN force 4 miles (6.4 km) northwest of the Rockpile, the action continued until 08:00 the next morning when the PAVN withdrew, leaving 23 dead; U.S. losses were ten killed. On 15 March at 06:00 15 122/140 mm rockets hit Cửa Việt Base. A Forward Air Controller (FAC) saw the firing position 4 miles (6.4 km) northeast of Gio Linh and directed artillery and naval gunfire onto the location, causing a secondary explosion. A Marine patrol moved to the firing location and engaged a PAVN force 3 miles (4.8 km) northeast of Gio Linh. The Marines were reinforced by amphibious vehicles at 07:30 and the battle continued until 10:40 when the PAVN withdrew, leaving ten dead and two captured and one 82 mm mortar.

On 16 March at 02:15 a Combined Action Platoon (CAP) operating 1 mile (1.6 km) north-northwest of Đông Hà was attacked by a PAVN company, the PAVN then withdrew to the northwest. As the patrol was returning to their base they were attacked again. U.S. losses were five killed and four Vietnamese civilians were killed. On 17 March at 17:00 a forward observer located newly constructed bunkers 5 miles (8.0 km) northeast of Gio Linh and directed naval gunfire onto the location, causing nine secondary explosions and destroying ten bunkers. On 23 March at 22:30 a Marine forward observer reported a PAVN force moving 8 miles (13 km) northwest of The Rockpile and directed artillery fire onto the location, causing nine secondary explosions. From 23 March to 3 April the 1st Brigade conducted Operation Montana Mauler near Firebase Fuller. On 24 March at 18:00 an armored cavalry unit of the 1st Brigade engaged a PAVN force 5 miles (8.0 km) northeast of the Rockpile, killing 23 PAVN.

On 25 March at 10:00 a unit of the 9th Marine Regiment engaged a PAVN force 5 miles (8.0 km) west of Cam Lo killing seven PAVN. At 16:00 the same unit encountered another PAVN force, killing a further four; U.S. losses were one killed. On 27 March at 10:00 infantry from the 1st Brigade patrolling 6 miles (9.7 km) northwest of Cam Lộ engaged a PAVN force. The unit was supported by armor, artillery, helicopter gunships and airstrikes and the PAVN withdrew at 18:30, leaving 120 dead and seven individual and three crew-served weapons; U.S. losses were 14 killed. On 28 March at 10:00 infantry from the 1st Brigade engaged an entrenched PAVN force 6 miles (9.7 km) northwest of Cam Lộ. The unit was supported by artillery and tactical airstrikes, causing four secondary explosions. The PAVN withdrew at 18:30, leaving 68 dead and 16 individual weapons; U.S. losses were one killed. On 29 March at 08:30 an aerial observer received fire 6 miles (9.7 km) north-northeast of Gio Linh and directed artillery onto the firing position, resulting in three secondary explosions and destroying four structures and killing one PAVN.

=== April ===
Operation Montana Mauler concluded on 3 April with 271 PAVN killed and 23 individual and six crew-served weapons captured; U.S. losses were 38 killed.

=== May ===
On 1 May at 07:00 a unit of the 3rd Marine Regiment engaged a PAVN force 6 miles (9.7 km) northwest of the Rockpile. The PAVN withdrew at 16:00, leaving seven dead and one individual and one crew-served weapons; U.S. losses were seven killed. At 16:40 an aerial observer saw a bunker complex 3 miles (4.8 km) northeast of Gio Linh and directed airstrikes onto the location which caused a secondary explosion and destroyed four bunkers. On 2 May at 09:15 a Marine CH-46 collided with an Army UH-1 while taking off from a landing zone 6 miles (9.7 km) northwest of the Rockpile, killing all 12 marines on board. At 14:25 an aerial observer saw PAVN near bunkers 5 miles (8.0 km) north of Gio Linh and directed artillery fire onto the position, resulting in two secondary explosions and killing two PAVN.

On 3 May at 13:45 an aerial observer saw PAVN near a bunker complex 3 miles (4.8 km) north-northeast of Gio Linh and called in artillery fire and airstrikes on the position, destroying four bunkers and killing four PAVN. At 20:40 a forward observer saw lights moving 9 miles (14 km) northwest of the Rockpile and directed artillery onto the position, causing ten secondary explosions. On 4 May at 16:55 an aerial observer saw a bunker complex 3 miles (4.8 km) north-northeast of Gio Linh and directed artillery fire onto the position, causing five secondary explosions. On 5 May at 18:20 an aerial observer received fire 6 miles (9.7 km) west-southwest of Con Thien and directed artillery and airstrikes onto the firing position, causing three secondary explosions and destroying eight bunkers.

On 6 May at midday an aerial observer saw six PAVN near a bunker complex 5 miles (8.0 km) west-southwest of Con Thien and directed artillery fire onto the position, destroying a bunker and killing five PAVN. At 16:30 an aerial observer received fire 4 miles (6.4 km) northwest of Gio Linh and directed artillery fire onto the position, causing one secondary explosion and destroying nine bunkers. The bodies of six PAVN were seen in the strike area. On 8 May at 08:30 a unit of the 3rd Marine Regiment patrolling 5 miles (8.0 km) north-northeast of the Rockpile engaged a PAVN squad in bunkers. The Marines attacked supported by artillery and the PAVN withdrew, leaving five dead; U.S. losses were two killed. At 11:00 an aerial observer received fire 8 miles (13 km) north-northwest of the Rockpile and directed artillery fire onto the firing position. On 9 May at 15:35 an aerial observer saw 15 PAVN moving 8 miles (13 km) north-northwest of the Rockpile and called in artillery fire, causing three secondary explosions and killing three PAVN.

On 10 May at 04:15 a unit of the 3rd Marine Regiment in a night defensive position 5 miles (8.0 km) north of the Rockpile received a ground probe. The Marines returned fire and were supported by AC-47 Spooky gunships forcing the PAVN to withdraw; U.S. losses were eight killed. At 09:45 an aerial observer saw 40 PAVN on a trail 25 miles (40 km) south-southwest of Quảng Trị and directed artillery and airstrikes onto the area, killing 27 PAVN. On 11 May at 17:35 an aerial observer saw PAVN 3 miles (4.8 km) west-northwest of Con Thien and directed artillery and airstrikes onto the area, killing 19 PAVN. On 12 May between 02:30 and 18:30 the PAVN fired mortars and rockets at U.S. bases near Gio Linh, the Rockpile and Con Thien. Naval gunfire was directed onto the firing positions, causing ten secondary explosions. At 17:40 a forward observer saw five PAVN moving 3 miles (4.8 km) north-northeast of Con Thien and directed artillery fire onto the position, causing a secondary explosion and killing three PAVN.

On 13 May at 15:05 a unit of the 3rd Marine Regiment in a position 7 miles (11 km) west-southwest of Con Thien received 15 82 mm mortar rounds, causing no damage, and directed artillery fire onto the firing position, resulting in one secondary explosion. At 17:40 a forward observer saw five PAVN 3 miles (4.8 km) north-northeast of Con Thien and directed artillery fire onto the position, causing a secondary explosion and killing three PAVN. On 15 May at 11:50 an aerial observer saw six to eight PAVN 6 miles (9.7 km) west-southwest of Con Thien and directed artillery fire onto them and five PAVN dead were seen in the strike area. On 16 May at 23:40 a Marine reconnaissance unit engaged a PAVN platoon 2 miles (3.2 km) northeast of Dong Ha, the battle continued sporadically until 05:30 on 17 May with the PAVN losing eight killed and one individual weapon captured.

On 17 May at 09:30 a Marine reconnaissance unit engaged a PAVN force 4 miles (6.4 km) northwest of the Rockpile. An aerial observer later saw 12 PAVN dead in the battle area. On 20 May at 18:30 an aerial observer saw PAVN 3 miles (4.8 km) north of Con Thien and directed artillery and airstrikes onto the location, causing four secondary explosions and killing five PAVN. On 24 May at 07:15 a forward observer saw five PAVN 3 miles (4.8 km) north-northeast of Con Thien and called in naval gunfire from the USS Saint Paul onto the position, killing four and destroying a bunker. At 07:45 a unit of the 3rd Marine Regiment in positions 4 miles (6.4 km) southwest of Con Thien received mortar fire and directed mortars and artillery fire onto the firing position, resulting in four secondary explosions. At 14:00 a unit of the 4th Marine Regiment patrolling 8 miles (13 km) northwest of the Rockpile found a munitions cache containing 90 82 mm mortar rounds, 45 antitank mines, 263 claymore type mines, 90 RPG grenades, 127 boxes of 12.7mm ammunition and 41 boxes of 7.62×39mm ammunition.

On 25 May at 11:35 a unit of the 3rd Marine Regiment in positions 4 miles (6.4 km) west-southwest of Con Thien received mortar fire and directed artillery onto the firing position. At 12:50 an aerial observer received fire 6 miles (9.7 km) north of the Rockpile and directed airstrikes onto the position, destroying three bunkers and killing four PAVN. At 17:00 a unit of the 3rd Marine Regiment in positions 9 miles (14 km) northeast of the Rockpile received five 82 mm mortar rounds which ignited an ammunition stockpile, killing eight marines. The Marines directed artillery fire onto the firing position. At 17:45 a unit of the 3rd Marine Regiment in positions 6 miles north of the Rockpile received mortar fire and directed artillery onto the firing position. On 27 May at 01:05 Cửa Việt Base was hit by ten 122 mm rockets and naval gunfire was directed onto the firing position, resulting in one secondary explosion. On 29 May at 10:40 an aerial observer received fire 2 miles (3.2 km) northeast of Gio Linh and directed airstrikes on the firing position, destroying a bunker. At 16:00 a unit of the 3rd Marine Regiment operating 5 miles (8.0 km) northwest of Cam Lộ received mortar fire, causing minimal damage. At 16:45 another unit of the Regiment operating 1 mile (1.6 km) north-northeast of Con Thien also received mortar fire, causing minimal damage. On 31 May 07:15 an aerial observer saw 15 PAVN carrying 122 mm rockets 3 miles (4.8 km) northeast of Gio Linh and called in naval gunfire and airstrikes on the position, destroying 16 bunkers and killing two PAVN. At 15:25 an aerial observer saw 8-10 PAVN 6 miles (9.7 km) west-southwest of Con Thien and directed artillery fire onto the area, killing two. At 19:30 an aerial observer saw PAVN at Khe Sanh and directed airstrikes on the location, killing ten.

=== June ===
On 3 June at 18:45 an aerial observer saw 20 PAVN at a bunker complex 3 miles (4.8 km) northeast of Con Thien and directed artillery fire onto the position, causing one secondary explosion, destroying four bunkers and killing six PAVN. On 5 June at 07:55 an aerial observer saw a rocket firing site 4 miles (6.4 km) northeast of Gio Linh and directed airstrikes onto the position. At 08:50 an aerial observer saw a rocket firing site 3 miles (4.8 km) northeast of Gio Linh with 22 rockets ready to fire and called in airstrikes, destroying the rockets. At 14:30 an aerial observer saw a rocket launching site 5 miles (8.0 km) northeast of Gio Linh with 38 rockets ready to launch and called in artillery fire, destroying the rockets and two bunkers and causing a secondary explosion. On 6 June at 07:05 an aerial observer saw six PAVN 6 miles (9.7 km) west-southwest of Con Thien and directed artillery fire onto them, killing five. At 14:00 an aerial observer received fire 6 miles west-southwest of Con Thien, killing the observer and the plane returned to base. Artillery and airstrikes were directed onto the firing position.

On 7 June at 11:30 a Marine reconnaissance patrol engaged a PAVN platoon 9 miles (14 km) northwest of the Rockpile. A Marine reaction force was landed by helicopter and supported the patrol until contact was lost. At 16:30 as a CH-46 attempted to extract the patrol it was hit by 12.7mm fire and crash-landed nearby. At 18:40 another CH-46 was also shot down and crash-landed. Artillery fire was directed onto the firing position and overnight the group moved overland to an evacuation site protected by AC-47 fire. On 9 June at 04:30 the group met up with another Marine relief force and on the evening of 10 June the wounded and aircrew were evacuated while the other Marines continued patrolling. On 9 June at 08:45 an aerial observer received fire 4 miles (6.4 km) north-northeast of Gio Linh and directed artillery fire onto the firing position. On 10 June at 16:45 a UH-1 was hit by 12.7mm fire 9 miles (14 km) northwest of the Rockpile and made a forced landing 1 mile (1.6 km) south of the DMZ, the helicopter was recovered. At 17:50 an aerial observer received fire 4 miles north of Gio Linh. On 12 June at 15:12 a forward observer directed artillery fire onto ten PAVN 3 miles (4.8 km) west-northwest of Gio Linh, killing three. At 15:45 an aerial observer saw huts and bunkers 8 miles (13 km) northwest of the Rockpile and directed artillery fire onto them, destroying 19 bunkers and killing two PAVN.

On 16 June at 16:15 an aerial observer received fire 7 miles (11 km) northwest of the Rockpile and directed artillery onto the position, resulting in one secondary explosion, six bunkers destroyed and one PAVN killed. On 17 June at 11:25 an aerial observer received fire 2 miles (3.2 km) northwest of Gio Linh and directed airstrikes onto the position, causing a secondary explosion and killing three PAVN. On 18 June at 03:35 a PAVN force attacked a 1st Brigade night defensive position 3 miles (4.8 km) southwest of Khe Sanh. The unit returned fire supported by helicopter gunships and the PAVN withdrew at 05:30, leaving 35 dead; U.S. losses were ten killed. At 10:30 a unit of the 9th Marine Regiment was fired on by an entrenched PAVN force 4 miles (6.4 km) southeast of Khe Sanh. The Marines attacked supported by artillery and airstrikes and the PAVN withdrew at 18:30, leaving 35 dead and four individual weapons; U.S. losses were nine killed. At 17:10 an aerial observer received fire 4 miles north of Gio Linh and directed naval gunfire from the USS Saint Paul onto the position, causing a secondary explosion and destroying four bunkers.

On 19 June at 10:00 a unit of the 9th Marine Regiment found a bunker complex 2 miles (3.2 km) southeast of Khe Sanh and directed artillery fire onto it, a search of the area found 11 PAVN dead. At 14:40 an aerial observer saw five PAVN 4 miles (6.4 km) east-northeast of Con Thien and directed artillery onto their position, killing two. On 20 June at 03:35 a unit of the 1st Brigade in night defensive positions 1 mile (1.6 km) southwest of Khe Sanh received mortar fire followed by a ground attack. The unit returned fire and the PAVN withdrew, leaving 25 dead and two captured and 18 individual and four crew-served weapons; U.S. losses were two killed. At 08:05 a forward observer saw PAVN near a bunker complex 5 miles (8.0 km) west of Con Thien and directed artillery and airstrikes onto the position, destroying 16 bunkers and killing nine PAVN. At 08:55 an aerial observer saw PAVN near a bunker complex 2.5 miles (4.0 km) north-northwest of Gio Linh and directed airstrikes onto the location, causing three secondary explosions, destroying three bunkers and killing two PAVN. At 10:00 a unit of the 9th Marine Regiment supported by airstrikes and an AC-47 engaged a PAVN force 2 miles (3.2 km) south-southeast of Khe Sanh. The PAVN withdrew at 16:00, leaving ten dead.

On 21 June at 17:10 an aerial observer saw three PAVN 4 miles (6.4 km) northwest of Gio Linh and directed artillery fire onto the location, killing two. On 25 June at 12:30 an aerial observer directed artillery fire and airstrikes onto a bunker complex 2.5 miles (4.0 km) north of Con Thien, causing two secondary explosions and destroying 11 bunkers and killing five PAVN. On 29 June at 18:15 an aerial observer saw PAVN near bunkers 4 miles (6.4 km) north-northeast of Con Thien and directed artillery fire onto the location, causing three secondary explosions, destroying four bunkers and killing two PAVN.

=== July ===
On 4 July at 22:45 a unit of the ARVN 1st Division located 5 miles (8.0 km) east-northeast of Gio Linh received rocket fire, causing minimal damage, and artillery and naval gunfire was directed onto the firing position. On 9 July at 18:40 a unit of the ARVN 1st Division located 1.3 miles (2.1 km) north-northeast of Gio Linh received mortar fire, artillery fire was directed onto the firing position, resulting in a secondary explosion. On 14 July at 07:45 a unit of the ARVN 1st Division located 0.6 miles (0.97 km) north-northeast of Gio Linh received mortar fire and artillery was directed onto the firing position. At 08:30 a unit of the 3rd Marine Regiment operating 2.5 miles (4.0 km) west-northwest of Con Thien was hit by five 122 mm rockets, causing minimal damage. A forward observer directed mortar and artillery fire onto the firing position. At 09:00 the same unit was hit by ten 122 mm rockets, causing minimal damage, and artillery fire was directed onto the firing position.

On 17 July at 11:25 a unit of the ARVN 1st Division operating 2 miles (3.2 km) north-northeast of Gio Linh received mortar fire and artillery fire was directed onto the firing position. An aerial observer saw PAVN 4 miles (6.4 km) northwest of Gio Linh and directed artillery fire onto the location, killing two. On 22 July at 16:30 a unit of the 9th Marines found a PAVN bunker complex 5 miles (8.0 km) southwest of the Rockpile consisting of 35 bunkers and containing 221 82 mm mortar rounds, 17 61 mm mortar rounds and 51 RPG grenades. On 23 July at 02:25 a unit of the 3rd Marines located 4 miles northeast of Con Thien received mortar fire and a forward observer directed artillery onto the firing position. On 25 July at 10:00 an aerial observer received fire 5 miles (8.0 km) west-northwest of Con Thien and directed artillery fire onto the position, causing a secondary explosion.

On 26 July at 15:10 an aerial observer saw PAVN near a bunker complex 4 miles (6.4 km) west of Con Thien and directed airstrikes onto the location, causing two secondary explosions and destroying three bunkers. On 27 July at 08:30 a unit of the 3rd Marines engaged a PAVN force 15 miles (24 km) west-northwest of Dong Ha supported by artillery and airstrikes. The PAVN withdrew, leaving nine dead and one individual weapon. At 18:15 an aerial observer saw PAVN 4 miles (6.4 km) north of Con Thien and directed artillery fire onto the location, killing three. On 28 July at 03:50 a unit of the 3rd Marines in a night defensive position 9 miles (14 km) northwest of Dong Ha was attacked by fire by a PAVN platoon. The Marines returned fire supported by artillery, helicopter gunships and an AC-47. The PAVN withdrew, leaving one dead and one individual weapon; U.S. losses were three killed. At 10:00 another unit of the 3rd Marines engaged a PAVN force 13 miles (21 km) west of Dong Ha. The fighting continued until the PAVN withdrew, leaving 12 dead.

On 29 July at 09:25 a U.S. and ARVN firebase 1 mile (1.6 km) north of Gio Linh received mortar fire and returned fire onto the firing position. At 12:30 a unit of the 3rd Marine operating 14 miles (23 km) west-northwest of Dong Ha found nine PAVN dead all had been killed in the previous three days. On 30 July at 08:50 an aerial observer received fire from a bunker complex 3 miles (4.8 km) west-southwest of Con Thien and directed artillery fire onto the location, causing three secondary explosions, destroying 19 bunkers and one 12.7mm machine gun and killing four PAVN. At 10:10 a tank-infantry task force from the 1st Brigade supported by artillery and airstrikes engaged a PAVN force 10 miles (16 km) northwest of Dong Ha. The PAVN withdrew at 15:15, leaving 13 dead and eight individual weapons; U.S. losses were three killed. On 31 July at 00:20 a unit of the 3rd Marines ambushed a PAVN force, killing six and capturing ten individual weapons. At 03:10 a CH-46 on a medevac mission was shot down 3 miles (4.8 km) west-southwest of Con Thien. Infantry from the 1st Brigade moving towards the crash site and engaged a PAVN company. The Infantry rescued the crew and as they were returning to their original position engaged another PAVN force. The PAVN eventually withdrew, leaving 17 dead and three individual and one crew-served weapons; U.S. losses were four killed and two Kit Carson Scouts killed. At 14:35 a unit of the 1st Brigade operating 4 miles (6.4 km) west of Con Thien received mortar fire and directed artillery and airstrikes onto the firing position, destroying four bunkers.

=== August ===
On 1 August at 10:10 a forward observer directed artillery fire onto eight PAVN 8 miles (13 km) north-northeast of the Rockpile, killing two. On 2 August at 07:15 an aerial observer saw eight PAVN near a bunker complex 8 miles (13 km) north-northeast of the Rockpile and directed artillery and airstrikes onto the position, causing two secondary explosions, destroying nine bunkers and killing six PAVN. Also at 07:15 a U.S./ARVN firebase 0.5 miles (0.80 km) north of Gio Linh was hit by mortar fire and artillery fire was directed onto the firing location. At 12:35 a Marine firebase 4 miles (6.4 km) south-southeast of Con Thien was hit by 20 107 mm rockets, causing minimal damage and artillery fire was directed onto the firing position. On 5 August at 17:30 a U.S. firebase 4 miles south-southeast of Con Thien received fire and artillery fire was directed onto the firing position. At 18:35 an aerial observer directed airstrikes onto ten PAVN 7 miles (11 km) west-southwest of Con Thien, killing one. At the same time another aerial observer saw ten PAVN 7 miles west of Con Thien and directed artillery fire onto the location, causing three secondary explosions. At 19:15 Con Thien was hit by five 140 mm rockets, causing minimal damage, artillery fire was directed onto the firing position 4.5 miles to the west.

On 7 August at 08:45 a unit of the 3rd Marines patrolling 4 miles (6.4 km) north-northeast of the Rockpile engaged with two PAVN companies in fortified positions. The Marines were supported by artillery, helicopter gunships and airstrikes and the PAVN withdrew at 17:00, leaving 29 dead and seven individual and one crew-served weapons; U.S. losses were four killed. At midday a unit of the 1st Brigade operating 4 miles west-southwest of Con Thien engaged a PAVN company and were supported by artillery and helicopter gunships. The PAVN withdrew at 14:20, leaving 56 dead and 23 individual and three crew-served weapons; U.S. losses were three killed. At 14:00 another unit of the 3rd Marines patrolling 4 miles northwest of the Rockpile engaged a PAVN force, killing five; U.S. losses were one killed. At 16:35 a forward observer saw PAVN fire being directed at a 1st Brigade unit 4 miles west-southwest of Con Thien and directed artillery fire onto the location. At 19:30 a U.S./ARVN firebase 6 miles (9.7 km) north of Gio Linh received mortar fire and returned fire on the position. On 8 August at 07:10 a U.S./ARVN firebase 4 miles (6.4 km) south of Gio Linh was hit by five 140 mm rockets, killing two marines and a Vietnamese civilian, artillery fire was directed onto the firing location. At 08:45 and 12:45 a U.S./ARVN firebase 7 miles (11 km) southwest of Gio Linh was hit by 122 mm rockets, causing minimal damage, artillery fire was directed onto the firing locations.

On 9 August at 22:00 a unit of the 3rd Marines in a night defensive position 6 miles (9.7 km) north-northwest of the Rockpile was attacked twice by PAVN forces. At 04:15 on 10 August another unit of the 3rd Marines was attacked by two PAVN companies. The Marines were supported by artillery, helicopter gunships and an AC-47. The PAVN withdrew at 06:15; however, the PAVN then attacked the first position again before being forced to withdraw. At 10:30 as the Marines swept the area they were hit by mortar fire. Total PAVN losses were 37 dead, while Marine losses were 19 killed. The PAVN were identified as coming from the 9th Regiment of the 304th Division. On 10 August at 04:15 a unit of the 3rd Marines in a night defensive position 13 miles (21 km) west-southwest of Con Thien was attacked by a PAVN force. The PAVN withdrew after two hours. At 06:30 a firebase 1 mile (1.6 km) north of Gio Linh received mortar fire and artillery was directed onto the firing location. At 09:00 the same firebase was again hit by mortar fire and artillery fire was directed onto the firing location. On 11 August at 10:40 a unit of the 3rd Marines supported by tanks engaged a PAVN platoon 4 miles (6.4 km) southwest of Con Thien. The PAVN withdrew and the Marines continued their patrol, later engaging two PAVN platoons in bunkers. The PAVN withdrew at 15:30, leaving 18 dead and 11 individual and two crew-served weapons.

On 15 August at 18:30 an aerial observer saw ten PAVN 6 miles (9.7 km) west-southwest of Con Thien and directed artillery fire onto the location, killing six. On 16 August at 07:40 an aerial observer directed artillery fire onto two PAVN and a bunker complex 6 miles (9.7 km) west-southwest of Con Thien, causing two secondary explosions and destroying two bunkers. On 17 August at 17:00 a unit of the 3rd Marines saw 30-40 PAVN 2 miles (3.2 km) north of the Rockpile and artillery and airstrikes were directed onto the location, killing 11. On 18 August at 14:20 an aerial observer received fire 2 miles (3.2 km) northeast of Gio Linh and directed airstrikes onto the position, causing a secondary explosion and destroying two bunkers. At 18:55 a unit of the 3rd Marines saw 37 PAVN moving towards a Marine ambush position 3 miles (4.8 km) north of the Rockpile. The Marines triggered their ambush, killing ten PAVN.

On 20 August at 07:15 a unit of the 4th Marines operating 5 miles (8.0 km) north-northwest of the Rockpile engaged a PAVN force losing two killed. On 21 August at 11:40 an aerial observer saw nine PAVN 5 miles west of Con Thien and directed artillery fire onto the location, killing five. At 13:30 another aerial observer operating in the same area saw six PAVN near a bunker complex 800m south of the earlier target and directed artillery fire onto the location, destroying two bunkers and killing one PAVN. On 22 August at 04:10 a mechanized unit of the 1st Brigade in a night defensive position 4 miles (6.4 km) west of Gio Linh received mortar fire followed by a ground attack. The unit returned fired supported by artillery and an AC-47 forcing the PAVN to withdraw; U.S. losses were one killed. At 18:30 a unit of the 3rd Marines operating 4 miles northwest of the Rockpile was ambushed by a PAVN force. The action continued until 22:00 when the PAVN withdrew, leaving eight dead; U.S. losses were six killed. On 23 August at 12:10 a unit of the 3rd Marines operating 5 miles northwest of the Rockpile was hit by 30 82 mm mortar rounds, causing minimal damage, artillery was directed onto the firing position.

On 24 August at 17:00 a mechanized unit of the 1st Brigade operating 3 miles (4.8 km) southwest of Con Thien found 15 PAVN dead, all had been killed by artillery fire three days previously. On 25 August at 21:50 a forward observer saw lights 4 miles (6.4 km) north-northeast of Gio Linh and directed naval gunfire onto the location, causing 25 secondary explosions. On 26 August at 09:45 an aerial observer received fire from a bunker complex 7 miles (11 km) north of the Rockpile and directed airstrikes onto the position, causing two secondary explosions and destroying four bunkers. On 27 August at 18:10 an aerial observer saw 4-6 PAVN 4 miles west of Con Thien and directed artillery fire onto the area, killing one.

On 28 August at 04:00 a unit of the 3rd Marines in a night defensive position 4 miles (6.4 km) south-southwest of Con Thien was attacked by fire. The Marines returned fire and the PAVN withdrew. The Marines were attacked again at 05:05 and the Marines returned fire and the PAVN withdrew at 05:55, leaving six dead and three individual and one crew-served weapon; U.S. losses were three killed. At 12:35 an aerial observer saw PAVN in a bunker complex 10 miles (16 km) northwest of the Rockpile and directed artillery onto the location, destroying six bunkers and killing one PAVN. At 13:25 an aerial observer saw PAVN at a bunker 12 miles (19 km) northwest of the Rockpile and directed artillery fire onto the location, resulting in a secondary explosion and destroying six bunkers and killing three PAVN. On 30 August at 15:35 an aerial observer received fire 6 miles (9.7 km) northeast of Gio Linh, artillery and naval gunfire from the USS Boston was directed onto the location, causing two secondary explosions and destroying seven bunkers and ten huts.

=== September ===
On 1 September at 14:45 a unit of the 3rd Marines engaged a PAVN squad 4 miles (6.4 km) northeast of the Rockpile, killing five and capturing two individual and one crew-served weapons. On 5 September at 13:55 an aerial observer received fire 200m south of the Ben Hai River, artillery and airstrikes were directed onto the location, destroying a bunker. On 6 September at 18:50 a U.S./ARVN firebase at Gio Linh received mortar fire and naval gunfire from the USS Saint Paul was directed onto the firing position.

On 10 September at 21:30 a 3rd Marines reconnaissance team ambushed a PAVN rice-gathering force 3 miles (4.8 km) southwest of Quảng Trị, killing all five and capturing four individual weapons. At 13:00 a unit of the 3rd Marines patrolling 3 miles north-northwest of the Rockpile attacked three PAVN in a bunker supported by artillery and helicopter gunships. The PAVN withdrew, leaving seven dead and one individual weapon. On 12 September at 06:55 an armored unit of the 1st Brigade in night defensive positions 4 miles (6.4 km) west of Gio Linh was hit by five 140 mm rockets, causing minimal damage, naval gunfire from the USS Saint Paul was directed onto the firing position. At 07:15 a U.S./ARVN firebase at Gio Linh received mortar fire, causing minimal damage. At 21:00 a unit of the ARVN 2nd Regiment in a night defensive position 4 miles east of Gio Linh received mortar fire and directed naval gunfire from the USS Saint Paul onto the firing position.

On 13 September at 19:20 a unit of the 3rd Marines was ambushed 4 miles (6.4 km) northwest of the Rockpile, the Marines returned fire and the PAVN withdrew, leaving one dead; U.S. losses were two killed. On 14 September at 09:00 an aerial observer received fire 5 miles (8.0 km) west-northwest of Con Thien and directed artillery fire onto the position, destroying a bunker. On 15 September at 08:20 a unit of the 3rd Marines engaged a PAVN force 5 miles northwest of the Rockpile. Artillery and air support was provided and the PAVN withdrew at 15:30; U.S. losses were four killed. At 10:30 an aerial observer received fire 11 miles (18 km) north-northeast of the Rockpile and directed artillery fire onto the area.

On 16 September at midday a unit of the 4th Marine Regiment found a munitions cache in a bunker complex 7 miles (11 km) north of Khe Sanh containing 142 82 mm mortar rounds and 10 61 mm mortar rounds. At 15:00 a 3rd Marine reconnaissance unit received fire from 30 PAVN 2 miles (3.2 km) southwest of the Rockpile and returned fire supported by airstrikes. The PAVN withdrew after 20 minutes, leaving ten dead and the Marines were extracted with one marine being killed after being struck by a helicopter blade during extraction. On 17 September at 00:50 a unit of the 3rd Marines in a night defensive position 2 miles (3.2 km) north-northwest of the Rockpile was probed by a PAVN force. At 02:00 the PAVN attacked the position and the Marines fought back supported by artillery, helicopter gunships, airstrikes and an AC-47. The PAVN withdrew at 03:00 but at 04:00 another attack was made from a different direction. The PAVN withdrew after 30 minutes but mortar fire continued to hit the Marines until dawn when reinforcements arrived. The bodies of 41 PAVN and 12 individual and two crew-served weapons were found around the perimeter; U.S. losses were 16 killed. At 13:20 a unit of the 4th Marines received fire while patrolling 4 miles (6.4 km) north-northwest of the Rockpile, the PAVN withdrew after 25 minutes, but fire increased as the Marines evacuated their casualties with the PAVN withdrawing at dusk, leaving seven dead; U.S. losses were nine killed. At 19:35 a U.S./ARVN firebase 4 miles (6.4 km) east of Gio Linh received mortar fire and naval gunfire from USS Boston was directed onto the firing position.

On 19 September at 05:00 a unit of the 3rd Marines in a night defensive position 2 miles (3.2 km) northwest of the Rockpile was attacked by hand grenades and later by RPGs and small-arms fire from a PAVN company. The Marines were reinforced but the attacks continued until the PAVN withdrew after 08:50, leaving three dead; U.S. losses were one killed. On 20 September at 14:30 a unit of the 1st Brigade found 15 PAVN dead 10 miles (16 km) west-northwest of Dong Ha, all had been killed by artillery six months previously. On 21 September at 19:25 a U.S./ARVN firebase 4 miles (6.4 km) east of Gio Linh received mortar fire and naval gunfire from USS Boston was directed onto the firing position. At 20:00 a 3rd Marines reconnaissance unit received fire 4 miles west of the Rockpile and returned fire supported by artillery, killing five PAVN. On 22 September at 17:45 a U.S./ARVN firebase near Gio Linh received mortar fire and artillery fire was directed onto the firing position.

On 23 September at 21:20 a unit of the ARVN 2nd Regiment in position 4 miles (6.4 km) east of Gio Linh was hit by 40 82 mm mortar rounds, naval gunfire from USS Boston was directed onto the firing location. On 25 September at 16:30 an aerial observed received fire 4 miles (6.4 km) north of Gio Linh and directed airstrikes onto the location, destroying a 12.7mm machine gun. At 23:15 a U.S./ARVN firebase 3 miles (4.8 km) east of Gio Linh received mortar fire and naval gunfire from the USS Boston was directed onto the firing position. On 27 September at 00:50 a unit of the 4th Marines in a night defensive position 2 miles (3.2 km) north of the Rockpile received mortar fire followed by a ground attack. The Marines returned fire and the PAVN withdrew; U.S. losses were two killed. On 28 September at 11:15 mechanized infantry from the 1st Brigade operating 3 miles (4.8 km) south-southeast of Con Thien was attacked by fire. The unit returned fire supported by airstrikes and in the afternoon another unit reinforced. The PAVN withdrew at 15:00, leaving 15 dead and one individual and five crew-served weapons; U.S. losses were three killed. At 14:40 a unit of the 1st Brigade operating 6 miles (9.7 km) northwest of Cam Lo received mortar fire.

On 29 September at midday a unit of the 4th Marines received mortar fire while patrolling 2 miles (3.2 km) north of the Rockpile. At 13:00 a unit of the 1st Brigade operating 4 miles (6.4 km) southwest of Con Thien found the bodies of nine PAVN and one individual weapon, all had been killed by airstrikes. On 30 September at 09:50 an aerial observer received fire 11 miles (18 km) north-northwest of Cam Lo and directed artillery fire onto the position, destroying ten bunkers. At 14:00 a 3rd Marines reconnaissance unit directed artillery and airstrikes onto five PAVN 9 miles (14 km) west of Quảng Trị, killing all five.

=== October ===
On 2 October at 01:55 a unit of the 1st Brigade in a night defensive position 4 miles (6.4 km) southwest of Con Thien was attacked by fire by a PAVN company. The unit returned fire supported by artillery and the PAVN withdrew, leaving 14 dead and one captured and four individual and seven crew-served weapons; U.S. losses were one killed. On this day units from the 101st Airborne Division (Airmobile) arrived in Quảng Trị Province to replace the elements of the 3rd Marine Division which were withdrawing from South Vietnam in Operation Keystone Cardinal. At 16:00 a unit of the 3rd Brigade, 101st Airborne Division operating 5 miles (8.0 km) north of the Rockpile engaged an entrenched PAVN platoon. The PAVN withdrew at 18:20; U.S. losses were two killed. On 3 October at 13:15 a unit of the 1st Brigade operating 6 miles (9.7 km) northwest of Cam Lo was hit by mortar fire, causing minimal damage. On 4 October at 18:50 a unit of the 101st Airborne operating 10 miles (16 km) northwest of the Rockpile received fire from two PAVN squads, the unit returned fire and the PAVN withdrew after 15 minutes.

On 6 October at 08:40 a unit of the 3rd Brigade, 101st Airborne operating 10 miles (16 km) northwest of the Rockpile found a munitions cache containing 22 122 mm rockets, 100 60 mm mortar rounds, 132 82 mm mortar rounds and two individual weapons. On 8 October an AH-1 Cobra helicopter gunship was shot down 11 miles (18 km) southeast of Quảng Trị, killing both crewmen. On 9 October at 00:15 two PAVN platoons attacked the night defensive position of a unit of the 4th Marines 3 miles (4.8 km) east of the Rockpile. The Marines returned fire supported by artillery and an AC-47. The PAVN withdrew at 01:35, leaving nine dead and two AK-47s; U.S. losses were eight killed. At 17:00 air cavalry from the 101st Airborne attacked ten PAVN 14 miles (23 km) west-northwest of the Rockpile, killing six; U.S. losses were one killed.

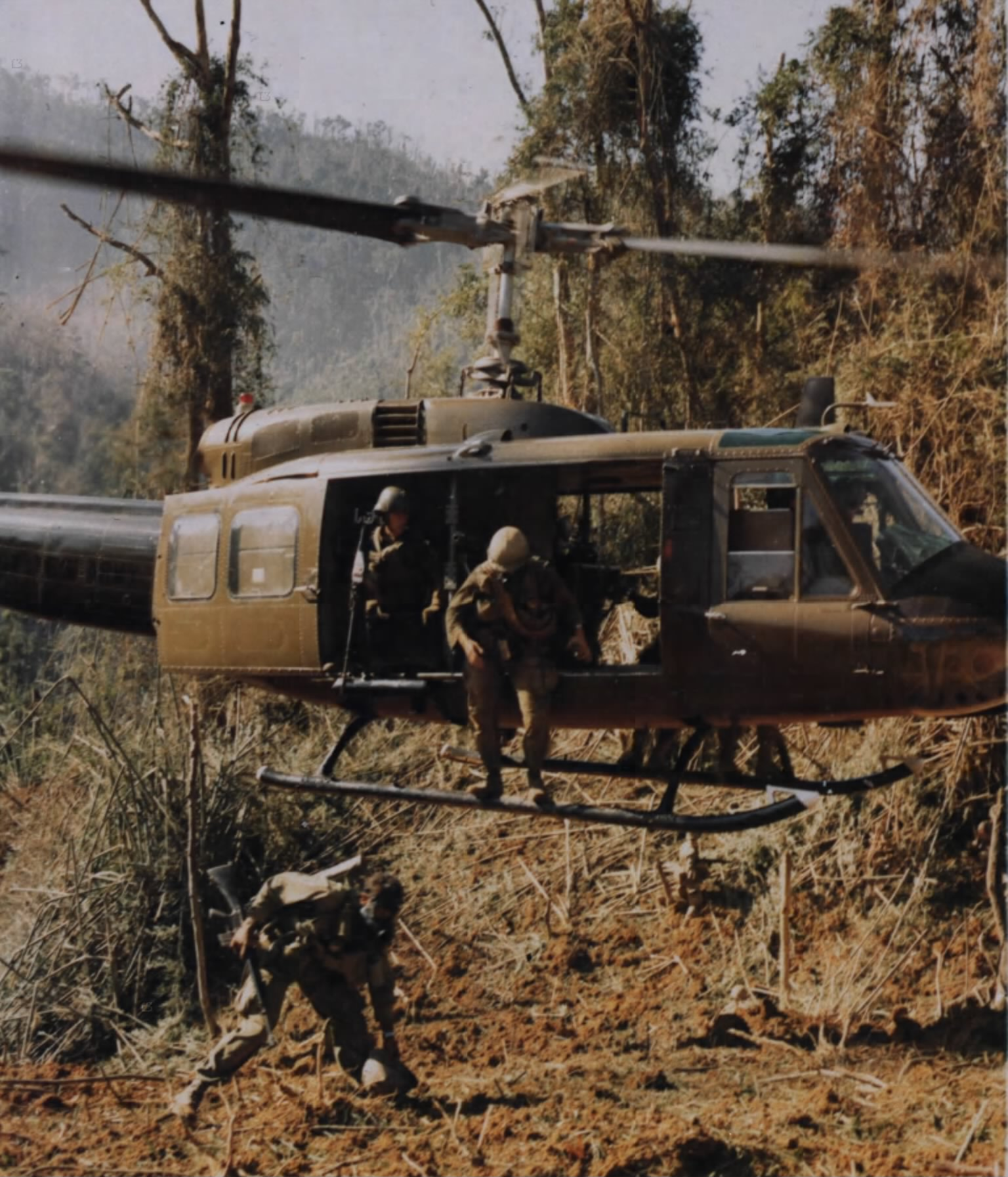
A UH-1D helicopter drops members of the 101st Airborne Division near the DMZ, 16 October 1969

On 10 October a Marine UH-1 was shot down 10 miles (16 km) west-northwest of Dong Ha killing three on board. On 12 October at 12:25 a 3rd Marines reconnaissance unit operating 4 miles (6.4 km) southwest of Dong ha directed artillery fire onto six PAVN killing all six. On 14 October at 11:00 an aerial observer received fire 12 miles (19 km) northwest of the Rockpile and attacked the position with rockets, killing five PAVN and destroying a bunker. On 15 October at 14:35 a forward observer directed artillery fire onto two PAVN 2 miles (3.2 km) northeast of Gio Linh, killing both.

On 17 October at 13:40 a unit of the 3rd Brigade, 101st Airborne patrolling 6 miles (9.7 km) west of the Rockpile found a munitions cache containing 317 82 mm mortar rounds, 22 anti-tank mines and 125 hand grenades. On 21 October at 09:00 a unit of the 1st Brigade patrolling 4 miles (6.4 km) west-southwest of Con Thien was hit by 45 mortar rounds, causing minimal damage. At 14:20 a unit of the 1st Brigade patrolling 3 miles (4.8 km) south-southwest of Con Thien was attacked by fire. The unit returned fire supported by artillery and airstrikes, killing three PAVN. On 22 October at 13:30 an aerial observer received fire 4 miles (6.4 km) north of Gio Linh and directed artillery fire onto the position, killing one PAVN. At 15:00 a unit of the 101st Airborne received mortar fire 6 miles (9.7 km) northwest of the Rockpile, killing three, artillery and airstrikes were directed onto the firing position. At the same time another Division unit 6 miles north-northwest of the Rockpile received mortar fire.

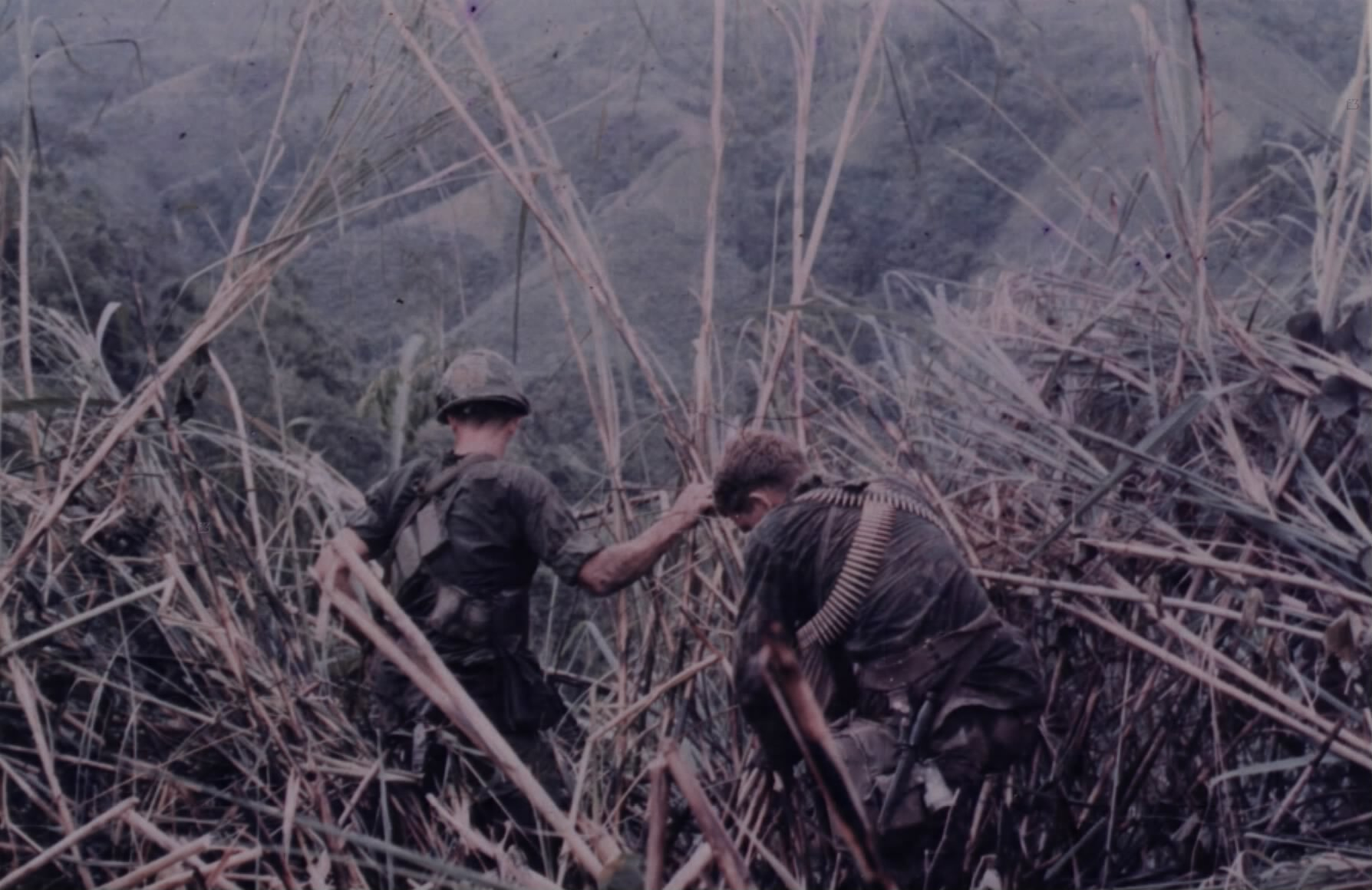
Men of the Recon Element of the 2nd Troop, 17th Cavalry, attached to the 3rd Brigade, 101st Airborne Division, clear an LZ on a hilltop, 21 November 1969

On 23 October at 18:15 a forward observer saw PAVN in fortified positions 5 miles (8.0 km) north-northwest of Gio Linh and directed naval gunfire from USS Waddell onto the position, destroying a bunker and killing one PAVN. On 24 October at 04:30 a unit of the 1st Brigade observed PAVN soldiers near their night defensive position 6 miles (9.7 km) northeast of the Rockpile and fired on them and directed artillery fire onto them, killing five and capturing three individual and two crew-served weapons.

=== December ===
On 1 December at 10:00 an aerial observer saw a PAVN platoon 4 miles (6.4 km) north-northwest of Con Thien and directed artillery fire onto the location, causing a secondary explosion and destroying three bunkers. Several minutes later the observer received fire 300m to the northeast and directed artillery fire onto the location. On 3 December at 19:20 helicopter gunships from the air cavalry squadron of the 101st Airborne attacked ten PAVN 9 miles (14 km) south of Khe Sanh, killing eight. On 20 December at 23:50 a unit of the 1st Brigade received fire from a PAVN platoon near the north bank of the Cửa Việt River and returned fire supported by helicopter gunships and a United States Navy Patrol Boat, River (PBR) forcing the PAVN to withdraw. On 21 December a UH-1 was shot down 13 miles (21 km) west-northwest of Dong Ha killing eight on board.

=== January 1970 ===
On 1 January at 09:55 Rangers from the 101st Airborne received fire 16 miles (26 km) southeast of Khe Sanh and returned fire, killing four PAVN. At 23:10 a unit of the 1st Brigade in night defensive positions 6 miles (9.7 km) northeast of Dong Ha was attacked by a PAVN force, the unit returned fire supported by helicopter gunships and later reinforced by infantry and PBRs. The PAVN withdrew at 04:10, leaving 16 dead and 11 individual weapons and two RPG-7 launchers. On 2 January at 07:20 a unit of the 1st Brigade operating 4 miles (6.4 km) south-southeast of Con Thien was hit by five 140 mm rockets. At midday an aerial observer received fire 4 miles north-northwest of Gio Linh. At 15:15 an ARVN armored cavalry unit located at Firebase Gio Linh received mortar fire and directed artillery fire onto the firing position. At 16:40 Firebase Gio Linh again received mortar fire, and artillery was directed onto the firing position. On 3 January at 12:40 helicopter gunships from the air cavalry squadron of the 101st Airborne received fire 11 miles (18 km) south-southeast of Khe Sanh and attacked the firing position, killing 19 PAVN.

On 5 January at 10:15 a convoy was ambushed 9 miles (14 km) south-southeast of Quảng Trị; U.S. losses were two killed. On 11 January at 13:00 a reconnaissance unit from the air cavalry squadron of the 101st Airborne received fire 22 miles (35 km) southwest of Quảng Trị and returned fire, killing four PAVN; U.S. losses were two killed. On 20 January at 10:35 helicopter gunships from the air cavalry squadron of the 101st Airborne attacked 20 PAVN 8 miles (13 km) south-southeast of Khe Sanh, killing 11. On 25 January at 08:05 a unit of the 1st Brigade at Con Thien was hit by ten 140 mm rockets and five minutes later another brigade unit 3 miles (4.8 km) south was hit by ten 140 mm rockets, causing minimal damage, artillery was directed onto the firing positions.

=== February ===
On 6 February it was announced that effective 9 March III MAF would become a subordinate command of XXIV Corps as Army forces had become the predominant military element in I Corps. On 7 February at midday an LCM hit a mine 1 mile (1.6 km) north of Dong Ha killing two crewmen and sinking the LCM.

On 22 February at 18:10 a Ranger unit from the 101st Airborne engaged 10–14 PAVN 10 miles (16 km) north-northeast of Khe Sanh, killing six. An AH-1 was shot down 4 miles (6.4 km) northwest of the Rockpile. On 24 February an OH-6 was shot down 6 miles (9.7 km) northwest of Khe Sanh, killing one crewman.

=== March ===
On 3 March a UH-1 was shot down 7 miles (11 km) southeast of Khe Sanh. On 12 March at 01:30 a unit of the ARVN 2nd Regiment and a U.S. artillery unit in a night defensive position 5 miles (8.0 km) west of Cam Lo was attacked by a PAVN force. The battle continued for two hours when the PAVN withdrew, leaving 30 dead and 15 individual weapons and two RPG launchers; U.S. losses were two killed. At 12:20 a helicopter gunship from the air cavalry squadron of the 101st Airborne received fire 5 miles southeast of Khe Sanh and attacked the firing position, killing seven PAVN.

On 14 March at 10:00 a unit of the 1st Brigade operating 5 miles (8.0 km) northwest of Cam Lo received mortar fire, artillery and helicopter gunships were directed onto the firing position. On 15 March at 16:25 an aerial observer saw PAVN troops 4 miles (6.4 km) north of Con Thien and directed artillery fire onto the location, causing a secondary explosion and killing one PAVN. On 27 March at 17:00 an OH-58 Kiowa light observation helicopter was shot down 10 miles (16 km) south of Quảng Trị. Troops from the air cavalry squadron of the 101st Airborne were landed nearby and engaged a PAVN force with support from helicopter gunships and airstrikes. Another unit was landed to reinforce, and the fighting continued throughout the night. The PAVN withdrew, leaving 16 dead, and the units were able to reach the crash site, finding both crewmen dead. On 31 March at 17:50 a light observation helicopter from the air cavalry squadron of the 101st Airborne attacked a PAVN force 25 miles (40 km) west-southwest of Quảng Trị. Air cavalry troops were landed in the area and engaged the PAVN until they withdrew; U.S. losses were one killed.

=== April ===
On 1 April between 14:40 and 21:00 units of the 1st Brigade at four different locations received a total of 110 rounds of 60/82 mm mortar fire and five 122/140 mm rockets, causing minimal damage. On 3 April at 11:00 a unit of the 1st brigade operating 4 miles (6.4 km) southwest of Con Thien received mortar and small arms fire, the unit returned fire supported by artillery and helicopter gunships. The PAVN withdrew after eight hours, leaving 27 dead; U.S. losses were five killed. On 4 April at 11:25 a unit of the 1st Brigade was attacked by fire 6 miles (9.7 km) southwest of Con Thien, the unit returned fire supported by tanks and helicopter gunships. The PAVN withdrew at 14:45, leaving 24 dead; U.S. losses were two killed. At 16:40 helicopter gunships of the 2/17th Cavalry attacked 14 PAVN 2 miles (3.2 km) southeast of Khe Sanh, killing ten. A Marine F-4 Phantom was shot down 14 miles (23 km) north of Khe Sanh.

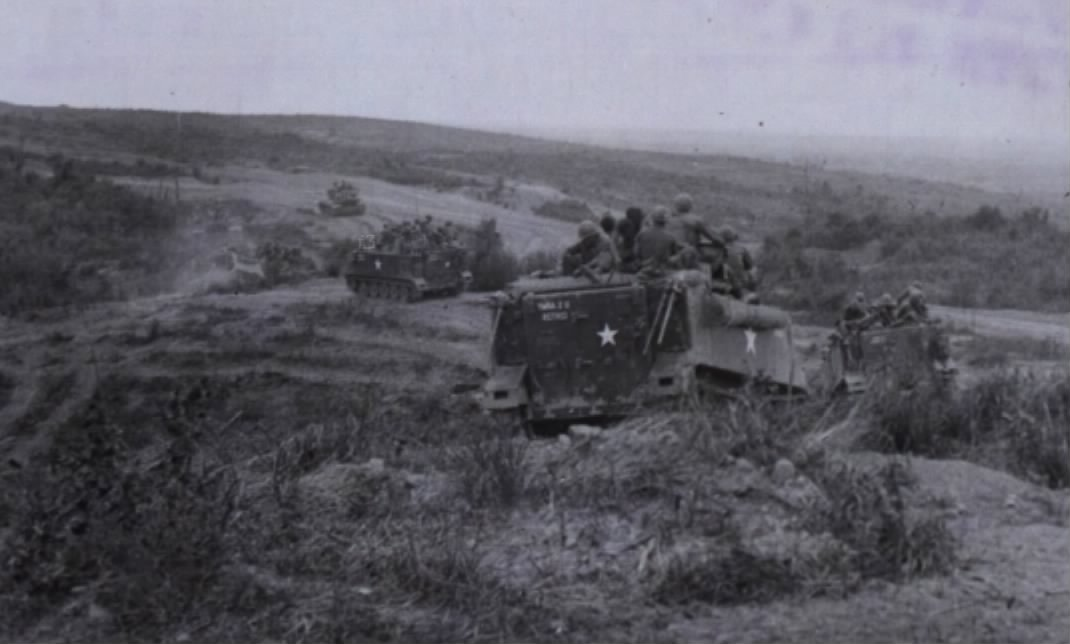
APCs of "C" Company 1st Battalion, 61st Infantry Regiment, 5 April 1970

On 5 April at 04:00 a unit of the 1st Brigade in a night defensive position 4 miles (6.4 km) northwest of Cam Lo was attacked by a PAVN platoon. The unit returned fire supported by helicopter gunships and an AC-119 gunship. The PAVN withdrew at 09:00, leaving four dead; U.S. losses were two killed and one M551 and two M113s destroyed. On 6 April at 04:50 a cavalry unit of the 1st Brigade in a night defensive position 3 miles (4.8 km) northwest of Cam Lo was attacked by fire. The unit returned fire and the PAVN withdrew at 06:30, leaving 16 dead and one captured and three individual and five crew-served weapons; U.S. losses were one killed.

On 8 April at 17:00 a unit of the air cavalry squadron of the 101st Airborne and a Ranger unit received fire 24 miles (39 km) west-southwest of Quảng Trị, the unit returned fire supported by helicopter gunships and the enemy withdrew; U.S. losses were one killed. On 9 April at 02:40 a unit of the 1st Brigade in a night defensive position 10 miles (16 km) southwest of Quảng Trị was attacked by fire. The unit returned fire and the PAVN withdrew, leaving 33 dead and 21 individual and three crew-served weapons. At 22:25 a unit of the 1st Brigade in a night defensive position 4 miles (6.4 km) southeast of Gio Linh engaged 10–15 PAVN after a Tripflare was triggered near their perimeter. The PAVN withdrew at midnight but sniper fire continued until 02:00. PAVN losses were nine killed and six individual and one crew-served weapons captured. At 23:00 a trip flare was activated on the perimeter of Mai Loc Camp altering the camp's defenders. At 02:35 on 10 April the camp was hit by 75–100 82 mm mortar and RPG rounds followed by a sapper attack by the PAVN 66th Regiment. The Civilian Irregular Defense Group (CIDG) forces, their Special Forces advisers and artillerymen with M42 Dusters defended the camp. The sappers penetrated the perimeter but were unable to reach the inner perimeter and tactical operations center. At 03:40 a unit from the 1st Brigade reinforced the camp and helicopter gunships and a Republic of Vietnam Air Force (RVNAF) AC-47 provided fire support. The PAVN withdrew by 04:55, leaving 19 dead; U.S. losses were six killed and 19 CIDG killed.

On 13 April at 02:45 Firebase Nancy (16.632°N 107.294°E) 9 miles (14 km) southeast of Quảng Trị occupied by a unit of the ARVN 1st Regiment and a U.S. artillery unit received mortar fire followed at 03:50 by a ground attack by a PAVN sapper company. The defenders returned fire and the PAVN withdrew. At dusk ARVN soldiers sweeping the perimeter made sporadic contact with PAVN. PAVN losses were 71 killed and nine captured and 11 individual and six crew-served weapons captured; U.S. losses were four killed and one M41 and one M-113 destroyed. Between 10:10 and 15:45 Firebase Fuller west of Cam Lo received 70 120 mm mortar rounds, causing minimal damage. At 10:55 a unit of the 1st Brigade operating 3 miles (4.8 km) north of Cam Lo was hit by ten 122 mm rockets, causing minimal damage. A CH-47 Chinook was shot down 7 miles (11 km) west of Cam Lo killing one on board.

On 21 April a unit of the 1st Brigade at Firebase Fuller received ten rounds of 120 mm mortar fire, causing minimal damage. On 23 April at 14:10 a unit of the 1st Brigade operating 4 miles (6.4 km) northwest of Cam Lo received 45 rounds of 82 mm mortar fire and helicopter gunships attacked the firing position. On 25 April a unit of the 1st Brigade in a night defensive position 1 mile (1.6 km) east of Con Thien received ten rounds of 60 mm mortar fire.

On 27 April at 02:15 a unit of the 1st Brigade in a night defensive position 5 miles (8.0 km) south of Cam Lo received five rounds of 60 mm mortar fire, counter-mortar fire was directed onto the firing position. At 15:15 helicopters from the air cavalry squadron of the 101st Airborne attacked six PAVN 12 miles (19 km) east-northeast of Khe Sanh, killing all six. On 28 April at 04:00 a U.S. artillery unit fired on a suspected PAVN location 8 miles (13 km) east of Quảng Trị and one round landed in a village, killing six Vietnamese civilians. On 30 April at 00:55 a unit of the 1st Brigade at Firebase Fuller received mortar fire followed by a sapper attack. The defenders returned fire supported by artillery and helicopter gunships and the PAVN withdrew, leaving 16 dead. South of Quảng Trị the ARVN 1st Battalion, 1st Regiment engaged a PAVN force, killing 14 and capturing three individual weapons and 10 tons or rice; ARVN losses were six killed.

=== May ===
On 5 May 16 km southeast of Khe Sanh, units of the ARVN 1st Battalion, 54th Regiment engaged a force from the PAVN 66th Regiment in three separate contacts, killing 83 PAVN; ARVN losses were eight killed. At 23:05 the ARVN 4th Battalion, 3rd Regiment in a night defensive position 5 km northeast of Gio Linh was probed by PAVN forces. The defenders engaged the PAVN supported by flareships and gunships and the PAVN withdrew, leaving 26 dead; ARVN losses were one killed. On 6 May at 05:30 Firebase Henderson occupied by Company A, 2nd Battalion, 501st Infantry Regiment and a unit of the ARVN 54th Regiment, received mortar and RPG fire followed by ground attacks from the northwest by the PAVN 66th Regiment. The 2-hour engagement cost the PAVN 29 dead while the defenders sustained 32 U.S. and 19 ARVN killed and three M114 155 mm howitzers heavily damaged. On 7 May, 16 km southeast of Khe Sanh the ARVN 1/54th uncovered a grave site containing 97 PAVN. Also on 7 May between 07:20 and 09:00 in two separate contacts 15 to 18 km east-southeast of Khe Sanh the ARVN 1/54th made contact with the PAVN killing 32 while losing one killed. On 10 May at 06:00 30 rounds of 82 mm mortar fire fell on Henderson, killing three ARVN. On 13 May the ARVN Hac Bao Reconnaissance Company of the 1st Division operating west of Cam Lo received ten rounds of 82 mm mortar fire, killing nine ARVN. On 14 May at 00:40, the Hac Bao Company operating 15 km west of Cam Lo received 300 rounds of 82 mm mortar fire and at 07:45 a further 250 mixed 60 and 82 mm mortar rounds.

On 15 May at 22:50 15 km south-southeast of Khe Sanh helicopter gunships from Company C, 4th Battalion, 77th Aerial Rocket Artillery Regiment received 23 mm antiaircraft fire. The helicopters engaged the PAVN with on-board ordnance, killing 35 PAVN and destroying two trucks. On 18 May at 08:25 three km southwest of Gio Linh the ARVN 2nd Battalion, 1st Regiment defensive position received a ground attack from a PAVN company. The ARVN forces were supported by artillery and gunships and the PAVN withdrew, leaving 28 dead; ARVN losses were three killed. On 19 and 20 May units of the ARVN 1st Division operating 12 km west of Cam Lo engaged PAVN forces in sporadic contacts, killing 41. On 22 May at 22:10 21 km east of Khe Sanh the ARVN 4th Battalion, 54th Regiment, in a night defensive position 21 km east of the village, received a mortar attack followed by a ground assault. Supported by artillery and airstrikes the ARVN repelled the attack, killing 52 PAVN for the loss of 14 ARVN. On 27 May at 04:00 16 km southeast of Quảng Trị the ARVN 1st Battalion, 1st Regiment and supporting artillery killed 14 PAVN; ARVN losses were seven killed. On 31 May a hamlet near Cam Lo defended by Popular Force (PF) and People's Self-Defense Force (PSDF) forces received a mortar and ground attack from a PAVN force losing 13 killed.

=== June ===
During the first week of June, the PAVN 9th Battalion, 66th Regiment struck Firebase Tun Tavern (16.567°N 106.935°E) with mortar fire followed by a ground attack. The defenders returned fire supported by artillery, helicopter gunships and airstrikes. PAVN losses were 136 killed while ARVN losses were 41 killed and U.S. losses two killed. On 23 June at 06:50 while searching an area 30 km southeast of Khe Sanh, the ARVN 1st Battalion, 1st Regiment engaged a PAVN force. The ARVN called in artillery and airstrikes to assist and a sweep of the area after contact was lost resulted in the discovery of a PAVN base camp containing numerous huts, buildings and a large supply of food and munitions, in addition to 47 PAVN dead. On 28 June near Gio Linh a unit of the ARVN 1st Battalion, 2nd Regiment engaged a PAVN company from the 270th Regiment, killing 41 PAVN and capturing two.

=== July ===
On 1 July southeast of Quảng Trị, elements of the 121st and 122nd Regional Force (RF) companies, and the Hải Lăng District PF Platoon were the target of a series of coordinated small-scale attacks in the lowland of Hải Lăng District. The ARVN 2nd Troop, 11th Armored Cavalry Squadron and the 3rd Battalion, 1st Regiment reinforced and the Hac Bao Company. The PAVN attempted to break contact and disperse, but ARVN elements regained contact, killing 135 PAVN from the 808th Battalion and 6th Battalion 812th Regiment; ARVN losses were 16 killed. On 6 July in the afternoon, a Ranger unit from the 101st Airborne operating 13 km northwest of Khe Sanh engaged a PAVN infiltration group, killing ten with artillery and helicopter gunship support. On 8 July at 11:30 4 km southwest of Khe Sanh, elements of Troop A, 2/17th Cavalry attacked a 250 strong PAVN force and Troop D was inserted, engaging the PAVN to the west. The PAVN withdrew after eight hours, leaving 139 dead and four captured; U.S. losses were four killed. Prisoner interrogations established that the units involved were the PAVN 1st and 2nd Battalions, 9th Regiment. On 11 July, 4 km southwest of Khe Sanh a unit of the ARVN 3rd Regiment found 143 PAVN killed by airstrikes 24-hours earlier. Nearby on 12 July while on a search and clear operation, elements of the same battalion engaged an estimated 40 PAVN. A search of the area revealed 14 PAVN bodies and 36 graves believed to have been there 24 to 48 hours. On 12 July at 08:00 31 km southwest of Quảng Trị a unit of the ARVN 1st Battalion, 1st Regiment on a search and-clear mission found 65 PAVN killed by air strikes 24-hours earlier. On 24 July at midday 41 km south-southwest of Khe Sanh. The ARVN 2nd Battalion, 1st Regiment, on a search and clear operation, found a PAVN base camp with 53 PAVN killed by airstrikes approximately 2-weeks earlier.

=== August ===
On 2 August at 10:00 24 km southwest of Quảng Trị the ARVN 2nd Battalion, 1st Regiment on a search operation killed 15 PAVN in a brief contact losing one killed. On 3 August 5 km south-southwest of Cam Lo a PAVN force was observed by Troop C, 3/5th Cavalry Regiment, while in night defensive positions, and engaged with organic weapons, supported by tank fire, artillery and gunships. The PAVN 31st Regiment lost 16 killed while U.S. losses were one killed. Later the same morning a second attack was launched by the PAVN 31st Regiment and it was repulsed killing a further 15. On 6 August 24 km southwest of Quảng Trị the ARVN 2nd Battalion, 1st Regiment on a search operation killed 13 PAVN in a six-hour battle, losing one killed.

On 12 August at 07:30, 15 km southeast of Quảng Trị, the 49th PF Platoon was attacked by RPG-2 fire, the contact continued and elements of the ARVN 54th Regiment, the 11th Armored Cavalry Squadron, two RF Companies and another PF Platoon were inserted into the area. The battle lasted 12 hours and PAVN losses were 127 killed, 14 captured and 45 weapons captured; ARVN losses were 17 killed. On 13 August in the same area, elements of the ARVN 54th Regiment and the 11th Armored Cavalry Squadron ACS had a 5-hour battle with an estimated two PAVN companies, killing 109 and capturing 14 and 34 weapons; ARVN losses were four killed. Also on 13 August 8 and 16 km southwest of Quảng Trị an RF Co battled PAVN forces in two separate engagements, killing 30 and capturing five and 10 weapons. On 14 August 7 km east of Quảng Trị, RF units killed 19 PAVN and captured six weapons while losing one killed.

On 16 August a unit of the ARVN 2nd Battalion, 2nd Regiment at Firebase Fuller was hit by 70 120 mm mortar rounds, killing 14 ARVN and destroying 20 bunkers. The ARVN artillery returned fire on the suspected firing positions. On 17 August from 06:00-18:00 Company B, 3rd Platoon, 2nd Battalion, 502nd Infantry Regiment, on a sweep of the area 23 km southwest of Quảng Trị found 34 PAVN bodies believed to have been killed the night before during an attack on the Company's night defensive position. On 18 August at 04:00 33 km southeast of Khe Sanh the ARVN 1st Battalion, 3rd Regiment while in a night defensive position was attacked by an estimated PAVN battalion. The unit returned fire supported by artillery, killing 38 PAVN. On 19 August 23 km southwest of Quảng Trị, Company B 3rd Platoon, 2nd Battalion, 502nd Infantry supported by helicopters and airstrikes killed 25 PAVN while losing one killed.

=== September ===
On 7 September the ARVN 3rd Battalion, 3rd Regiment while on a sweep mission 24 km southwest of Quảng Trị found 21 PAVN killed by air the previous day. On 14 September near Firebase Barnett 24 km southwest of Quảng Trị, an ambush element from the ARVN 4th Battalion, 3rd Regiment killed 25 PAVN from the 9th Regiment; ARVN losses were five killed. On 18 September at 03:00 35 km southeast of Khe Sanh, aircraft of Company C, 2/17th Cavalry were conducting a forward looking infrared mission when they located and attacked 40 PAVN killing 18. On 20 September west of Gio Linh, a UH-1 from Company C, 158th Assault Helicopter Battalion was shot down while inserting a reconnaissance team from the 75th Ranger Regiment. Later in the morning, Company A, 1st Brigade received 60/82 mm mortar fire after being inserted to secure the crash site. U.S. losses were four killed and seven missing.

=== October ===
On 8 October at 11:10 9 km southwest of Khe Sanh, helicopter gunships from Company C 3/17th Cavalry engaged forces from the Quảng Trị Rear Service, killing 26. On 14 October west of Cam Lo, a unit of the ARVN 2nd Regiment engaged a PAVN company from the 27th Regiment, killing three and capturing 100 RPG grenades and 200 82 mm mortar rounds. On 17 October at 09:10 the ARVN 2nd Troop, 7th Cavalry and the U.S. 14th Engineer Battalion, while conducting a minesweeping operation 13 km south of Quang Tri, were ambushed by elements of the PAVN 808th Battalion. The ARVN/U.S. troops returned fire, killing 19 PAVN; U.S. losses were two killed and two M113s destroyed.

=== November ===
On 14 November 14 km south-southwest of Quảng Trị the ARVN 3rd Company, 4th Battalion, 1st Regiment engaged elements of the PAVN 814th Battalion. The PAVN withdrew at 14:00 hours, leaving 21 dead; ARVN losses were one killed. On 22 November at 15:45 105 82 mm mortar rounds hit Firebase Fuller, killing one ARVN.

=== December ===
On 5 December at 08:05 a unit of the 1st Brigade supported by helicopter gunships engaged a PAVN force 18 miles (29 km) northwest of Quảng Trị, killing five PAVN and capturing two individual weapons; U.S. losses were one killed. On 12 December at 19:30 a unit of the 1st Brigade on patrol 1 mile (1.6 km) south of the DMZ inadvertently entered an old U.S. minefield and detonated anti-personnel mines, killing six U.S. On 17 December at 08:00 19 km south of Quảng Trị, units of the ARVN 1st and 2nd Battalions, 1st Regiment while sweeping an area where air strikes had been placed on 16 December, found 17 PAVN bodies and 21 huts with connecting tunnels. The huts and tunnels were then destroyed.

On 18 December 45 km west of Quảng Trị, elements of the 2/17th Air Cavalry, supported by helicopter flareships, engaged 15 PAVN from the 246th Regiment, killing ten. On 19 December at 01:45 a unit of the 101st Airborne supported by helicopter gunships engaged 15 PAVN 28 miles (45 km) west of Quảng Trị, killing ten. On 20 December at 08:00 helicopters from the 1st Brigade attacked seven PAVN 18 miles (29 km) northwest of Quảng Trị. An aerorifle platoon was landed in the area and engaged a PAVN force which withdrew, leaving seven dead and one radio; U.S. losses were one Kit Carson Scout killed. On 25 December south of Quảng Trị a unit of the ARVN 3rd Battalion, 1st Regiment, engaged PAVN from the 808th Battalion, killing 11. On 27 December at 09:45 the 95th, 98th, 100th, 164th and 170th PF Platoons operating 7 km southeast of Gio Linh, engaged a company of the PAVN 270th Regiment supported by helicopter gunships from the 1st Brigade, killing 22 PAVN.

=== 1971 ===
Throughout early 1971 U.S. and ARVN forces in Quảng Trị Province were largely focused on Operation Lam Son 719. On 9 July Firebase Charlie 2, the last U.S. firebase along the DMZ was turned over to the ARVN. On 7 August the 1st Brigade, 5th Infantry Division (Mechanized) left South Vietnam.

== Aftermath ==
With the departure of U.S. ground forces from Quảng Trị Province, responsibility for the security of the area fell on the ARVN which raised the 3rd Division to defend the area.
