= Firebase Henderson =

Former US military installation in Vietnam

Site information
- Type: Marines/Army
- Condition: abandoned

Location
- Coordinates: 16.642°N 106.953°E

Site history
- Built: 1969
- In use: 1969-70
- Battles/wars: Vietnam War

Garrison information
- Occupants: 9th Marine Regiment; 101st Airborne Division

Firebase Henderson was a U.S. Marine Corps and U.S. Army firebase located south of Ca Lu, Quảng Trị Province in central Vietnam. It was approximately 9 km south of Ca Lu Combat Base and 12 km southeast of Vandegrift Combat Base.

== History ==
The base was secured by the 3rd Battalion 9th Marines in Operation Dawson River West on 18 January 1969. The base used to support Operation Dewey Canyon a Marine assault into the Đa Krông Valley and was abandoned thereafter. The base was reoccupied on 11 June 1969 by the 2nd Battalion 9th Marines and 2nd Battalion, 12th Marines as part of Operation Cameron Falls.

The base was occupied by elements of the 2nd Battalion, 501st Infantry Regiment, 2nd Battalion, 11th Artillery, 326th Engineer Battalion and Army of the Republic of Vietnam units supporting Operation Texas Star when it was attacked by the People's Army of Vietnam (PAVN) 33rd Sapper Battalion at 05:00 on 6 May 1970, resulting in 27 U.S., 3 ARVN and 29 PAVN killed.
