= 3/9 =

3/9 may refer to:

- March 9 (month-day date notation)
- September 3 (day-month date notation)
- 3rd Battalion, 9th Marines, an infantry battalion of the United States Marine Corps
