= Firebase Cunningham =

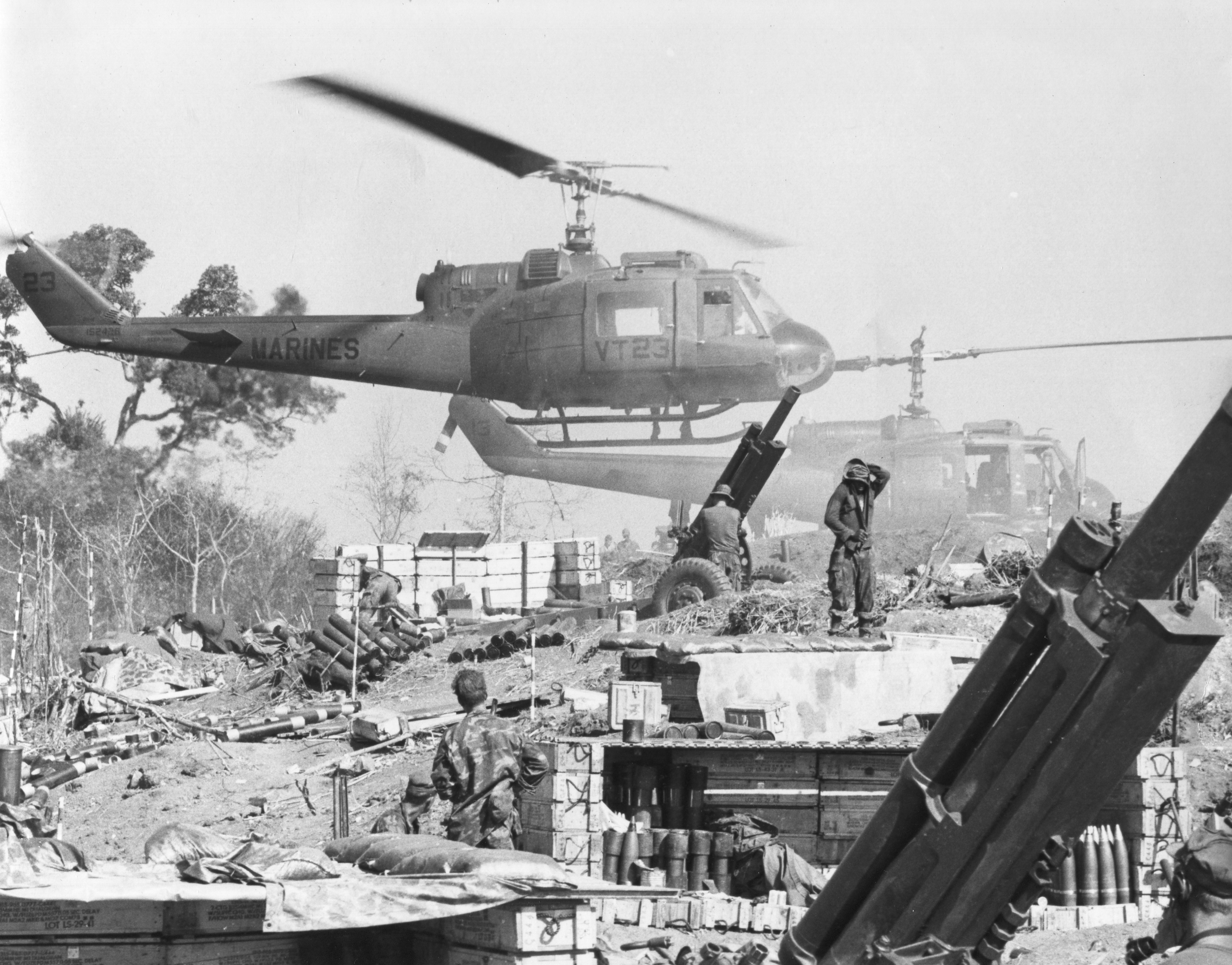
- UH-1Es at Firebase Cunningham during Operation Dewey Canyon

Site information
- Type: Marines

Location
- Coordinates: 16.4°N 107.04°E

Site history
- Built: 1969
- In use: 1969
- Battles/wars: Vietnam War

Garrison information
- Occupants: 2nd Battalion, 3rd Marines

Firebase Cunningham (also known as FSB 2, FSB Cutlass, or Hill 672) was a U.S. Marine Corps firebase southwest of Đông Hà, Quang Tri Province in central Vietnam.

== History ==
The base was established overlooking the Đa Krông Valley 38 km southeast of Vandegrift Combat Base 1 km north of Route 922. The base was named after Alfred A. Cunningham, the first Marine Corps aviator.

The base was established on 25 January 1969 by the 2nd Battalion, 3rd Marines in support of Operation Dewey Canyon. Over the next five days the Regiment command post and five artillery batteries from 2nd Battalion, 12th Marines moved to Cunningham. On 2 February the base was hit by 30-40 rounds of People's Army of Vietnam (PAVN) 122mm artillery fire resulting in five Marines killed. On the early morning of 17 February PAVN sappers attacked the base resulting in four Marines and 37 PAVN killed. From 10 March the Marine units began withdrawing back to Vandegrift and by 18 March Cunningham was closed.

== Current use ==
The base has reverted to jungle.
