= Alfred M. Wilson =

Alfred Mac Wilson
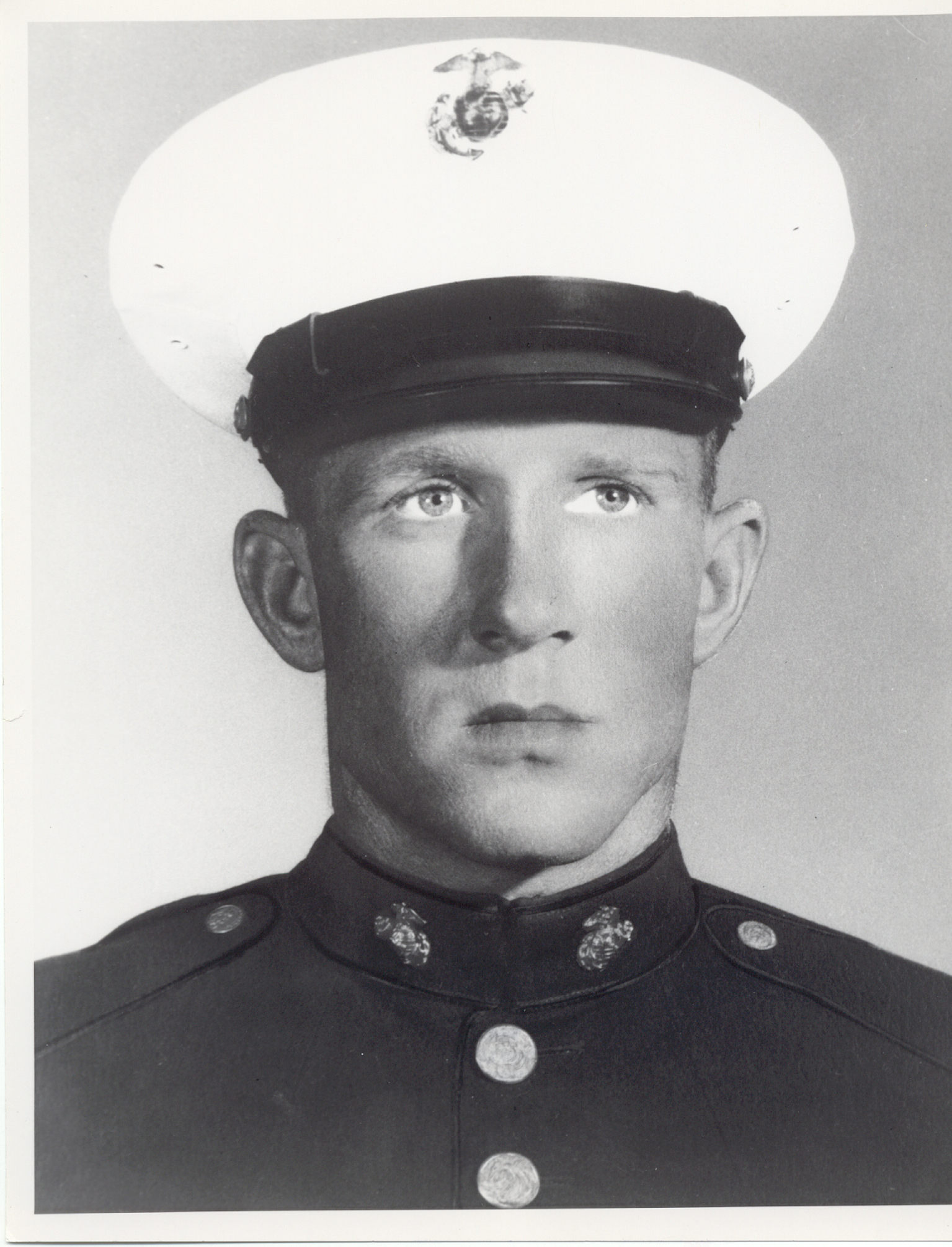
- Alfred M. Wilson, posthumous Medal of Honor recipient
- Born: January 13, 1948; Olney, Illinois, US
- Died: March 3, 1969 (aged 21) near Firebase Cunningham, Quang Tri Province, Republic of Vietnam
- Military career
- Allegiance: United States
- Branch: United States Marine Corps
- Service years: 1967–1969
- Rank: Private First Class
- Nickname: "Mac"
- Units: Company M, 3rd Battalion, 9th Marines, 3rd Marine Division
- Conflicts: Vietnam War: Operation Dewey Canyon †
- Awards: Medal of Honor; Purple Heart

Alfred Mac Wilson (January 13, 1948 – March 3, 1969) was a United States Marine who posthumously received the Medal of Honor for heroism in Vietnam in March 1969.

While returning from a reconnaissance mission during Operation Dewey Canyon, Wilson's platoon was ambushed, and their machine gunner and assistant were wounded. While facing enemy fire to retrieve the weapon, an enemy hand grenade was thrown between Wilson and a fellow Marine. Wilson threw himself on the grenade, absorbing the full force of the blast, sacrificing his life to save another.

== Early life ==
Alfred M. Wilson was born on January 13, 1948, in Olney, Illinois. He moved with his family to Odessa, Texas, in 1950 and attended Burleson Elementary School and Crockett Junior High School and in 1967 graduated from Odessa Senior High School. He was active in football and track as well as the Distributive Education Club while in high school. His hobbies included shooting, hunting, fishing, football, and tennis.

== Military service ==
He enlisted in the United States Marine Corps Reserve at Abilene, Texas, on November 1, 1967, and was discharged to enlist in the Regular Marine Corps on January 14, 1968.

He underwent recruit training with the 3rd Recruit Training Battalion, Recruit Training Regiment, Marine Corps Recruit Depot, San Diego, California. Upon completion of recruit training, in April 1968, he was transferred to Camp Pendleton, California, and completed individual combat training with Company D, 1st Battalion, 2nd Infantry Training Regiment, in May, and basic infantry training in June. He was promoted to private first class on July 1, 1968.

Private First Class Wilson arrived in the Republic of Vietnam in July 1968, and was assigned duty as a rifleman with Company D, 1st Battalion, 27th Marines, 1st Marine Division. He served in this capacity until September 1968. He was later reassigned as a rifleman with Company M, 3rd Battalion, 9th Marines, 3rd Marine Division.

Wilson was killed in action in the vicinity of Fire Support Base Cunningham, Quang Tri Province on March 3, 1969. While returning from a reconnaissance mission, Wilson's platoon was ambushed. While facing fire to retrieve the machine gun from the platoon's wounded machine gunner, an enemy hand grenade was thrown between Wilson and a fellow Marine. Wilson threw himself on the grenade, absorbing the full force of the blast, sacrificing his life. For these actions, Wilson was posthumously promoted to the rank of Corporal; and was awarded the Medal of Honor.

On April 20, 1970, his Medal of Honor was presented to his family by Vice President Spiro T. Agnew at the White House.

== Medal of Honor citation ==
The President of the United States takes pride in presenting the MEDAL OF HONOR posthumously to

PRIVATE FIRST CLASS ALFRED M. WILSON
UNITED STATES MARINE CORPS

for service as set forth in the following CITATION:

For conspicuous gallantry and intrepidity at the risk of his life above and beyond the call of duty while serving as a Rifleman with Company M, Third Battalion, Ninth Marines, Third Marine Division in action against hostile forces in the Republic of Vietnam. On March 3, 1969, while returning from a reconnaissance in force mission in the vicinity of Fire Support Base Cunningham in Quang Tri Province, the First Platoon of Company M came under intense automatic weapons fire and a grenade attack from a well-concealed North Vietnamese Army force pinning down the center of the column. Rapidly assessing the situation, Private First Class Wilson, acting as Squad Leader, skillfully maneuvered his squad to form a base of fire and act as a blocking force while the point squad moved to outflank the enemy. During the ensuing fire fight, both his machine gunner and assistant machine gunner were seriously wounded and unable to operate their weapon. Realizing the importance of recovering the M-60 machine gun and maintaining a heavy volume of fire against the hostile force, Private First Class Wilson, with complete disregard for his own safety, followed by another Marine, fearlessly dashed across the fire-swept terrain to recover the weapon. As they reached the machine gun, a North Vietnamese soldier threw a grenade at the Marine. Reacting instantly, Private First Class Wilson fired a burst from his M-16 rifle killing the enemy soldier. Observing the grenade fall between himself and the other Marine, Private First Class Wilson, fully realizing the inevitable result of his actions, shouted to his companion and unhesitatingly threw himself on the grenade, absorbing the full force of the explosion with his own body. His heroic actions inspired his platoon members to maximum effort as they aggressively attacked and defeated the enemy. Private First Class Wilson's indomitable courage, inspiring valor and selfless devotion to duty upheld the highest traditions of the Marine Corps and the United States Naval Service. He gallantly gave his life for his country.

/S/ RICHARD M. NIXON

== Medals and decorations ==
Wilson's medals and decorations include: the Medal of Honor, the Purple Heart, the National Defense Service Medal, the Vietnam Service Medal, and the Republic of Vietnam Campaign Medal.

Medal of Honor		Purple Heart
National Defense Service Medal	Vietnam Service Medal	Republic of Vietnam Campaign Medal

== Memorials ==
Alfred M. Wilson's name is inscribed on the Vietnam Veterans Memorial ("The Wall") on Panel 30W Line 035.

The United States Post Office on Texas Avenue in Odessa, Texas, was named in honor of Alfred M. Wilson by efforts of Congressman Mike Conaway and Senator John Cornyn.

In July 2015, Hood Junior High School in Odessa was renamed, Wilson and Young Medal of Honor Middle School; In their honor.

== See also ==
- List of Medal of Honor recipients for the Vietnam War
