= William D. Morgan =

William David Morgan
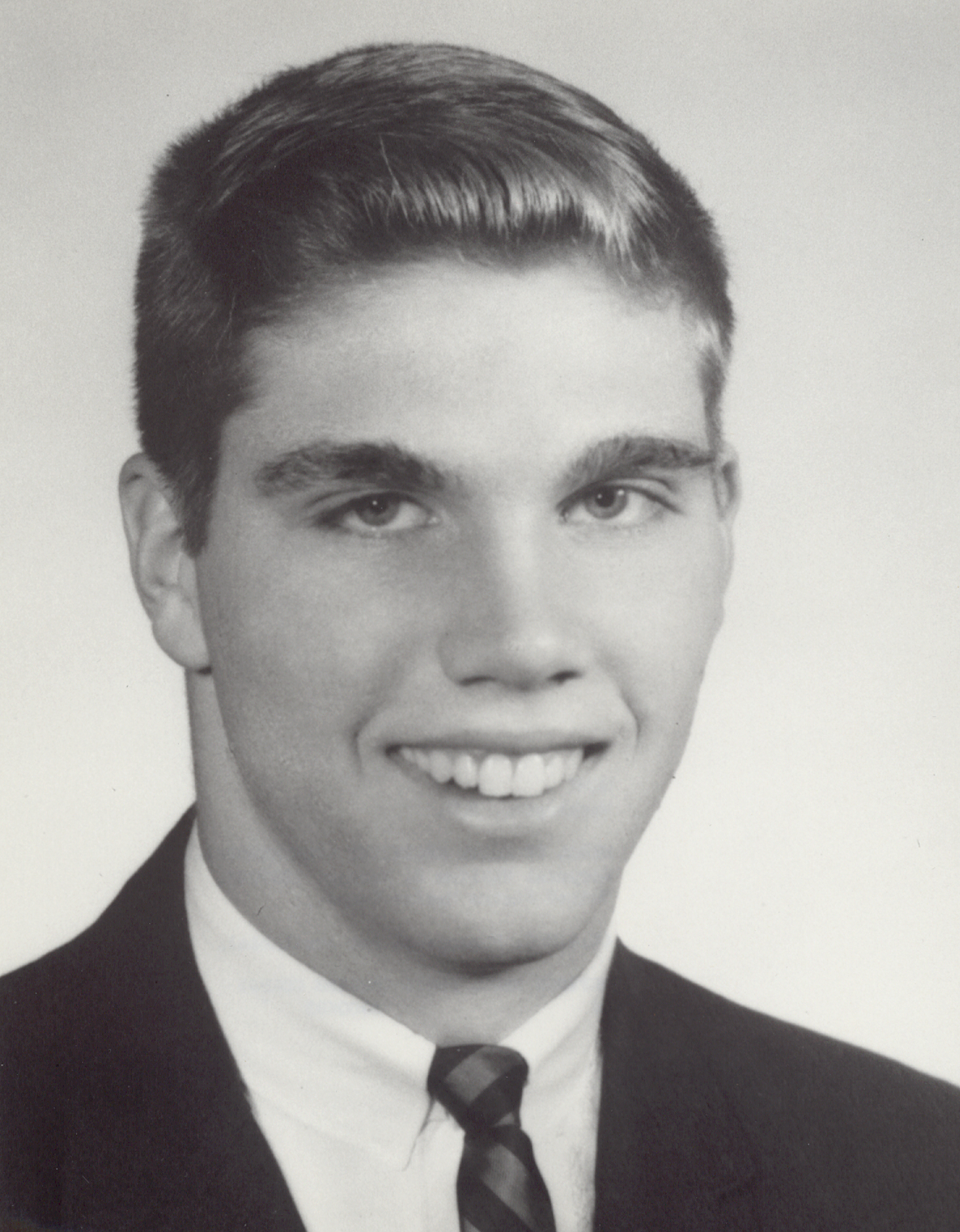
- William D. Morgan, Medal of Honor recipient
- Born: September 17, 1947; Pittsburgh, Pennsylvania, U.S.
- Died: February 25, 1969 (aged 21) near Vandegrift Combat Base, Quang Tri Province, South Vietnam
- Burial place: Mount Lebanon Cemetery, Mount Lebanon, Pennsylvania
- Military career
- Allegiance: United States of America
- Branch: United States Marine Corps
- Service years: 1966–1969
- Rank: Corporal
- Units: Company H, 2nd Battalion 9th Marines, 3rd Marine Division
- Conflicts: Vietnam War: Operation Dewey Canyon †
- Awards: Medal of Honor; Purple Heart

William David Morgan (September 17, 1947 – February 25, 1969) was a United States Marine Corporal who posthumously received the Medal of Honor — the United States' highest military decoration — for heroic actions during the Vietnam War. Corporal Morgan was killed in action on February 25, 1969.

== Biography ==
William David Morgan was born on September 17, 1947, in Pittsburgh, Pennsylvania, the youngest son of Welsh immigrant John Samuel Morgan and Helen Morgan. He attended Mt. Lebanon High School in Mt. Lebanon, Pennsylvania, graduating in 1966. He then attended Hiram Scott College, Scotts Bluff, Nebraska, for six months.

Morgan enlisted in the U.S. Marine Corps Reserve in Pittsburgh on November 18, 1966. He was discharged from the Reserves on January 4, 1967, to enlist in the Regular Marine Corps.

Upon completion of recruit training with the 3rd Recruit Training Battalion, Marine Corps Recruit Depot Parris Island, South Carolina in March 1967, he was transferred to Marine Corps Base Camp Lejeune, North Carolina, where he completed individual combat training with Company D, 1st Infantry Battalion, 1st Infantry Training Regiment, in April. From May until June 1967, he was a student at the Sea School, Marine Barracks, U. S. Naval Shipyard, Portsmouth, Virginia. He was promoted to private first class on June 1, 1967, and to Lance Corporal on February 1, 1968.

Lance Corporal Morgan served a one-year tour of sea duty with the Marine Detachment aboard the USS Newport News (CA-148). In July 1968, he was transferred to the Republic of Vietnam. He served as a rifleman, fire team leader, and squad leader, with Company H, 2nd Battalion, 9th Marines, 3rd Marine Division. He was promoted to Corporal on September 1, 1968. While participating in Operation Dewey Canyon, southeast of Vandegrift Combat Base on February 25, 1969, he was killed in action.

== Decorations ==
A complete list of his medals and decorations includes: the Medal of Honor, the Purple Heart, the National Defense Service Medal, the Vietnam Service Medal with two bronze stars, the Vietnam Cross of Gallantry Unit Citation and the Republic of Vietnam Campaign Medal.

Medal of Honor		Purple Heart
National Defense Service Medal	Vietnam Service Medal with two bronze stars	Republic of Vietnam Campaign Medal

== Medal of Honor citation ==
The President of the United States in the name of the Congress of the United States takes pride in presenting the MEDAL OF HONOR posthumously to

CORPORAL WILLIAM DAVID MORGAN
United States Marine Corps

for service as set forth in the following CITATION:

For conspicuous gallantry and intrepidity at the risk of his life above and beyond the call of duty while serving as a squad leader with Company H, in operations against the enemy. While participating in Operation DEWEY CANYON southeast of Vandegrift Combat Base, one of the squads of Corporal Morgan's platoon was temporarily pinned down and sustained several casualties while attacking a North Vietnamese Army force occupying a heavily fortified bunker complex. Observing that 2 of the wounded Marines had fallen in a position dangerously exposed to the enemy fire and that all attempts to evacuate them were halted by a heavy volume of automatic weapons fire and rocket-propelled grenades, Corporal Morgan unhesitatingly maneuvered through the dense jungle undergrowth to a road that passed in front of a hostile emplacement which was the principal source of enemy fire. Fully aware of the possible consequences of his valiant action, but thinking only of the welfare of his injured companions, Corporal Morgan shouted words of encouragement to them as he initiated an aggressive assault against the hostile bunker. While charging across the open road, he was clearly visible to the hostile soldiers who turned their fire in his direction and mortally wounded him, but his diversionary tactic enabled the remainder of his squad to retrieve their casualties and overrun the North Vietnamese Army position. His heroic and determined actions saved the lives of 2 fellow Marines and were instrumental in the subsequent defeat of the enemy. Corporal Morgan's indomitable courage, inspiring initiative and selfless devotion to duty upheld the highest traditions of the Marine Corps and of the U.S. Naval Services. He gallantly gave his life for his country.

/S/ RICHARD M. NIXON

Additional Information

One of the Marines that was saved by William Morgan that day is Robert "Bob" Ballou of Redlands, California. One of the Marines KIA was Robinson Santiago who was directly behind Bob Ballou.

== In memory ==
The name of William David Morgan is inscribed on the Vietnam Veterans Memorial ("The Wall") on Panel 31W Line 054 There is a small memorial to him at Mount Lebanon High School.

== See also ==
- List of Medal of Honor recipients
- List of Medal of Honor recipients for the Vietnam War
