= Operation Dewey Canyon =

Part of the Vietnam War (1969)

- Part of the Vietnam War
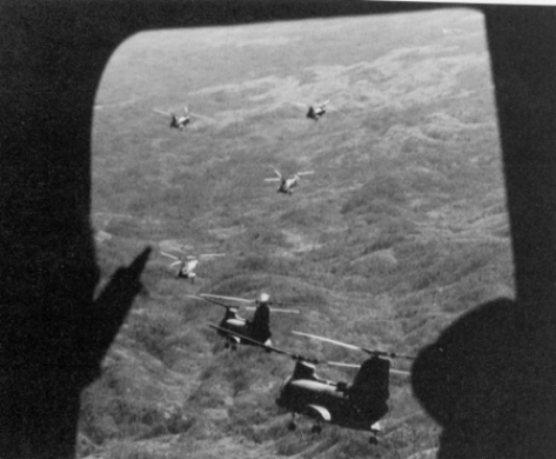
- U.S. Marine CH-46 Sea Knights during Operation Dewey Canyon
Date	22 January – 18 March 1969
Location	A Shau Valley, Thừa Thiên–Huế Province, South Vietnam
Result	See "Aftermath"

Belligerents
United States	North Vietnam

Commanders and leaders
Robert H. Barrow; George W. Smith	Unknown

Units involved
9th Marine Regiment; 2nd Battalion, 12th Marines	9th Regiment

Strength
	~5,000

Casualties and losses
130 killed	1,617 killed 500 tons of arms discovered

Operation Dewey Canyon was the last major offensive by the 3rd Marine Division during the Vietnam War. It took place from 22 January through 18 March 1969 and involved a sweep of the People's Army of Vietnam (PAVN)–dominated A Shau and Song Đa Krông Valleys by the 9th Marine Regiment. Based on intelligence and captured documents, the PAVN unit in contact was believed to be the 9th Regiment.

The 56 days of combat were a tactical success but did not stop the overall flow of North Vietnamese men and matériel into South Vietnam. The 9th Marine Regiment and attached units were awarded the Army Presidential Unit Citation for their actions in Operation Dewey Canyon.

== Background ==
Throughout 1967 and into 1968, the United States Marine Corps units in the northern I Corps region had been tied to their combat bases along the South Vietnam border as part of the McNamara Line. This "line" was a combination of infantry units and ground sensors devised to stop PAVN infiltration into South Vietnam across the border and along the Ho Chi Minh Trail. When Maj. Gen. Raymond G. Davis took command of the 3rd Marine Division, he ordered Marine units to move out of their combat bases and engage the enemy. He had noted that the manning of the bases and the defensive posture they developed was contrary to the aggressive style of fighting that Marines favor.

In early 1969, intelligence reports indicated there had been a large PAVN build-up in the A Shau and Đa Krông Valleys. The A Shau was just 10 km east of the Laotian border and some 34 km long, while the Đa Krông was several kilometers further east and separated by two mountain ranges.

The operation, named Operation Dawson River South was to comprise 3 distinct phases: first was the southern movement of the 9th Marines and supporting units into mutually supporting firebases near the objective area, second was a period of intensive patrolling around the firebases and finally, the Regiment would attack into the PAVN base areas. The Marine operation would be coordinated with supporting actions by the 101st Airborne Division and the Army of the Republic of Vietnam (ARVN) 2nd Regiment, 2nd Division east of the operations area.

General Davis would later state that the purpose of the operation was to disrupt PAVN logistics, not engage PAVN units stating "There was no [PAVN] force down there, we knew that. Our primary target was to go in and ferret out this system - without any thought that there was a major force down there."

== Operation ==
=== Phase 1 ===
On 18 January the 3rd Battalion, 9th Marines was lifted from Vandegrift Combat Base to reoccupy Firebase Henderson. On 20 January Company L, 3/9 Marines reoccupied Firebase Tun Tavern (16.567°N 106.935°E) and on the 21st Company A, 1st Battalion, 9th Marines reoccupied Firebase Shiloh (16.515°N 106.969°E).

On 22 January the 2nd Battalion, 9th Marines was lifted from Vandegrift to establish two new firebases further south: Dallas (16.405°N 106.967°E) and Razor (16.441°N 107.002°E). On 24 January the 9th Marines command post was moved from Vandegrift to Razor.

On 25 January 3/9 Marines established Firebase Cunningham 6 km southeast of Razor and over the following four days the 9th Marines command post and five artillery batteries from 2nd Battalion, 12th Marines moved to Cunningham.

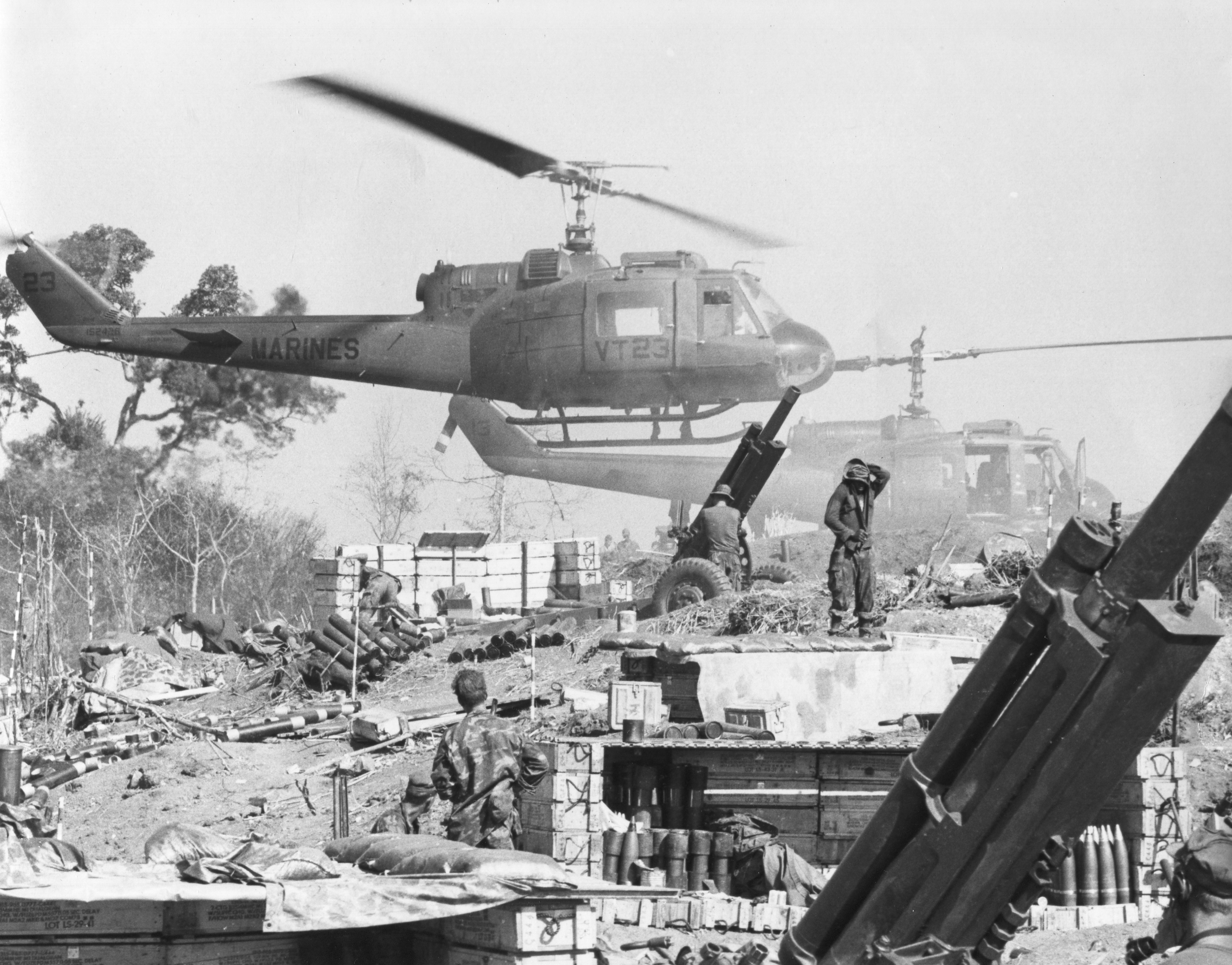
Marine UH-1Es at Fire Base Cunningham during Operation Dewey Canyon

=== Phase 2 ===
The Operation was renamed Operation Dewey Canyon and on 24–5 January Companies from 2/9 and 3/9 Marines began patrolling south from Razor and Cunningham discovering the PAVN 88th Field Hospital which had been abandoned the previous day.

On 31 January after a brief firefight with PAVN forces Company G secured Hill 1175, while Company F established Firebase Erskine (16.479°N 107.039°E). On 1 February Company K established Firebase Lightning which was occupied by the ARVN 1st and 2nd Battalions, 2nd Regiment.

On 2 February Firebase Cunningham was hit by 30-40 rounds of PAVN 122mm artillery fire from Laos resulting in five Marines killed.

With bad weather limiting patrolling and resupply, the Marine infantry were withdrawn to their bases. On 5 February as Company G withdrew from Hill 1175 they were ambushed resulting in five Marines killed and 18 wounded, while only two PAVN bodies were found. LCpl. Thomas Noonan Jr. would be posthumously awarded the Medal of Honor for his actions during the engagement.

On 10 February, Company H, 2/9 Marines captured a large cache of ammunition, weapons and equipment while on patrol five kilometers northwest of FSB Cunningham. The haul of ammunition included 363 RPG-2 rounds and 120 rounds of 60mm mortar ammunition.

=== Phase 3 and the raid into Laos ===
The third phase commenced on 11 February 1969. 1/9 Marines engaged a PAVN force preparing to attack Firebase Erskine and killed 25 PAVN. Company M repulsed a PAVN platoon killing 18 for the loss of two Marines, while Company C killed 24 PAVN for the loss of two Marines. On 16 February Company K, 3/9 Marines killed 17 PAVN. On the 17th Company G, 2/9 Marines killed 39 PAVN for the loss of five Marines.

On the early morning of 17 February PAVN sappers attacked Firebase Cunningham resulting in four Marines and 37 PAVN killed.

On 18 February Company A, 1/9 Marines encountered a PAVN bunker system which they overran killing 30 PAVN. The following morning Company C continued the attack against nearby PAVN positions killing a further 30 PAVN with total Marine losses of one killed. On the afternoon of the 20th Company C encountered another PAVN bunker system killing 71 PAVN and capturing two 122mm field guns. Company A continued the attack killing a further 17 PAVN, total Marine losses were six dead.

Also on 18 February Company L, 3/9 Marines discovered a PAVN cemetery containing 185 bodies buried in June 1968.

As the Marines approached the Laotian border and in response to the artillery attack on Cunningham, Davis had sent requests up the chain of command to get permission to enter Laos. This led to a redirection of MACV-SOG's Operation Prairie Fire to conduct reconnaissance near Base Area 611 in Laos. On February 20, Lieutenant General Richard G. Stilwell forwarded Davis' request to have a limited raid into Base Area 611 up to COMUSMACV General Abrams for his approval.

By 20 February, 2/9 Marines had both Companies E and H on the Laotian border. From their position, Company H could see enemy convoys traveling along Route 922. Company H Commanding Officer David F. Winecoff later reported:

"The company, of course, was talking about let's get down on the road and do some ambushing. I don't think they really thought that they were going to let us go over into Laos ... I knew if the military had their way we'd be over there in Laos and the company was all up for it.... With the Paris Peace Talks going on, I wasn't sure what route was going to be taken."

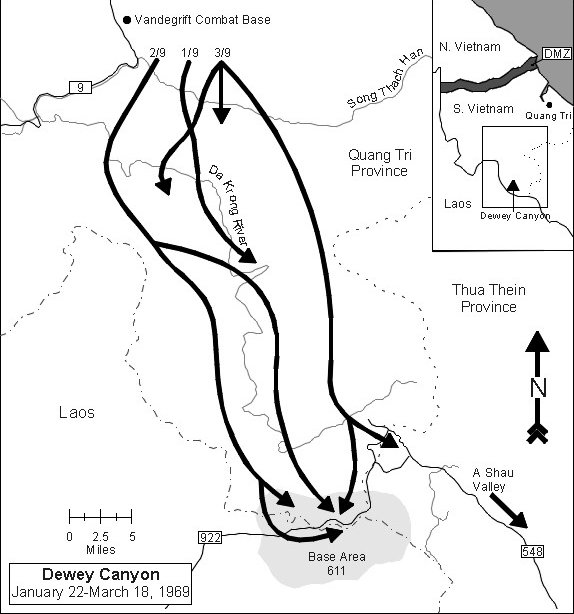

On 21 February, Winecoff received a message from Colonel Barrow, 9th Marines Commanding Officer, to set up an ambush along Route 922. The Captain's men needed rest, and he requested a postponement but was denied by Barrow. Winecoff utilized his 1st and 2nd Platoons, and at 16:10, 1st Platoon moved out and made its way to 2nd Platoon's position. At 18:30, Winecoff briefed his men on the ambush. After dark they moved out towards Route 922, about 900 meters away. By 01:00, Winecoff and Company H were in place and setting up the ambush. Within minutes of getting into position they started hearing trucks coming down the road and continued to observe as 40 minutes later, a lone truck and one PAVN soldier also walked through the kill zone. Winecoff had not wanted the ambush sprung on one truck or soldier, realizing that eventually a bigger target would come down the road. At 02:30, the lights of eight trucks appeared, and as three trucks came into the kill zone the column of vehicles stopped. Not wanting to give away the ambush or their position Winecoff, set off the claymores and the ambush. The Marines poured small arms and automatic weapons fire on the three vehicles, the forward observer alerted the artillery, and rounds bracketed the company position.

After minutes of fire, Winecoff had his men moved forward, ensuring that everything was destroyed. The company proceeded to move out to the rally point 600 meters away and waited till daylight. Later, it rejoined with 3rd Platoon who had not been involved with the ambush because of the heavy patrols it had been involved with in the previous days. H Company was resupplied and the men rested. They had destroyed three trucks and killed eight PAVN soldiers. Company H did not suffer any casualties.

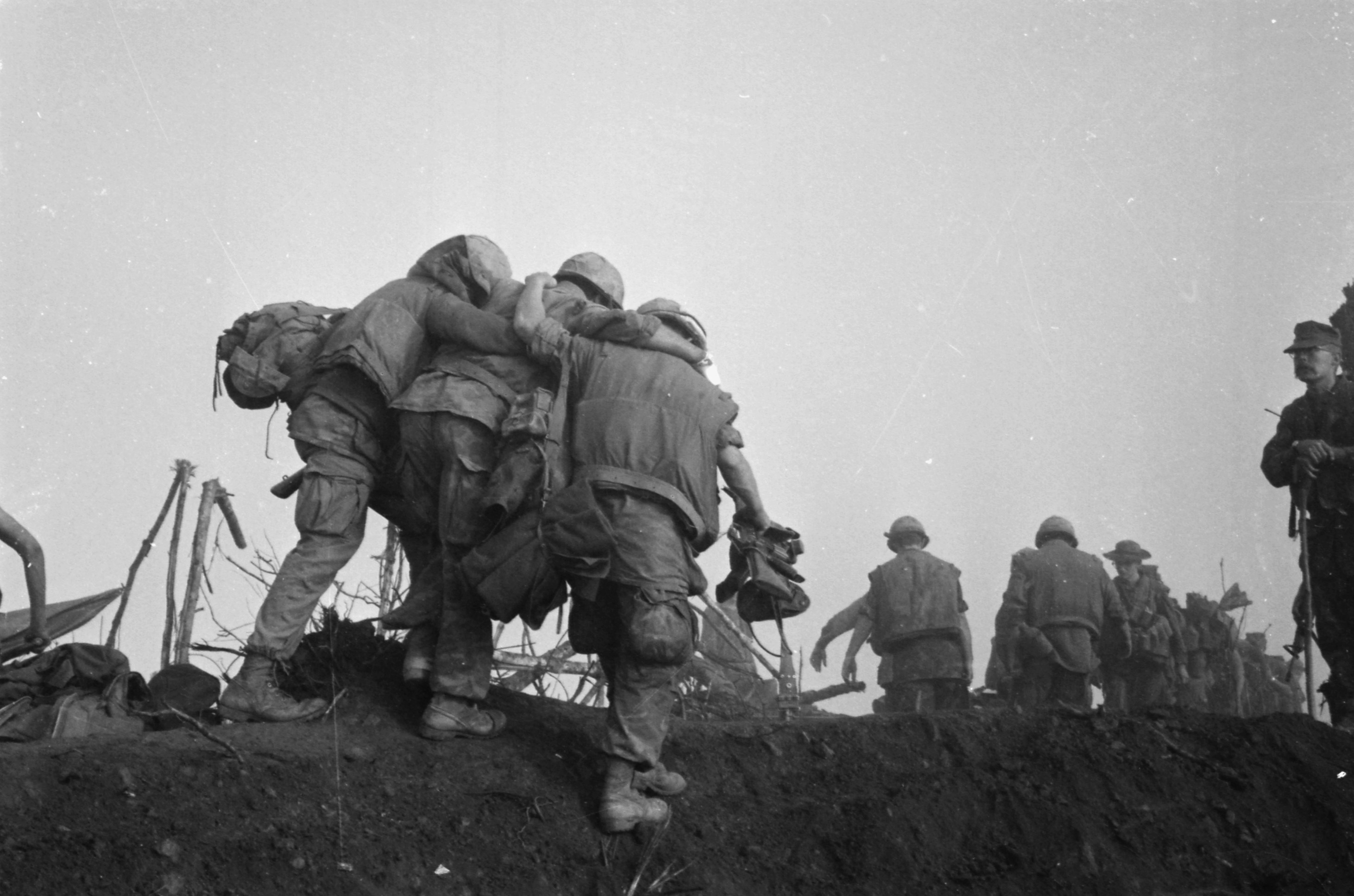
A wounded Marine is helped to an evacuation point

After Action Reports of the patrol were met with positive reviews, Abrams formally approved the operation. The success of the operation was more valuable than just the destruction of the enemy, because it allowed Barrow to request that continued operations in Laos be approved. His reasoning for continued operations was the presence of the enemy in the area was a threat to his troops. Barrow noted, "I put a final comment on my message, which said, quote, "Put another way, my forces should not be here if ground interdiction of Route 922 not authorized." The message finally reached Abrams via Stilwell, who had adopted Barrow's recommendation. Abrams approved further action on 24 February, but restricted discussions of the Laotian operation.

Also on 21 February Company M, 3/9 Marines discovered a PAVN maintenance facility including a bulldozer and on further searching around Hill 1228 discovered two 122mm field guns and a large tunnel complex inside the mountain.

On 22 February Company A, 1/9 Marines overran a PAVN position eight kilometers southeast of FSB Erskine killing seven PAVN for the loss of one Marine. As Company A continued patrolling they encountered and overran an entrenched PAVN Company killing 105 PAVN for the loss of 11 Marines. Captured documents indicated the unit in contact was the 3rd Battalion, 9th Regiment (also known as the K.16 Battalion). The Company A commander 1Lt Wesley L. Fox would be awarded the Medal of Honor for his actions during the battle.

Company H was ordered to go down Route 922 on 24 February. Morale was low because the Marines were tired after several days of patrolling, additionally, they did not want to leave the resupplies that included 60 mm mortar ammunition and C-rations. Company H was to move into Laos followed by Companies E and F and push eastward on the road, forcing the PAVN into the 1st and 3rd Battalions. After a six-hour night march, Company H set up a hasty ambush; at 11:00 on 24 February, six PAVN soldiers walked into their kill zone, of which four were killed. On February 25, Company H continued to move eastward again engaging PAVN, resulting in the capture of one 122 mm field gun, two 40mm antiaircraft guns and the killing of eight PAVN soldiers. Company H suffered two dead and seven wounded. Later that day a company patrol was ambushed by an estimated 15 PAVN troops who were dug in fortified bunkers and fighting holes. The patrol was reinforced and was able to fight its way through, capturing a second 122 mm gun and killing two. Casualties were mounting for Company H: three killed and five wounded. Corporal William D. Morgan was one of the men killed in action when he made a daring dash and directed fire away from Private First Class Robinson Santiago and Private Robert Ballou. Ballou was wounded multiple times that day and Santiago was killed-in-action. Morgan was posthumously awarded the Medal of Honor for this action.

Company H, flanked by Companies E and F, continued their drive east, which was rapid and did not allow for the Companies to conduct thorough searches. Advancing much slower would have garnered much more equipment. However, 2nd Battalion did capture 20 tons of foodstuffs and ammunition, while killing 48 PAVN soldiers. On 26 February, Company F, 2/9 Marines discovered a large cache nine kilometers south of FSB Erskine which included 198 rounds of 122mm artillery ammunition and 1,500 rounds of 12.7mm ammunition for anti-aircraft guns.

On 28 February at 13:00 a squad patrol from Company G, 2/9 Marines came under heavy fire from approximately 25 PAVN. The squad was pinned down and reinforcements were sent to the location (16°18′17″N 106°58′40″E), however as the patrol leader had lost his map it was difficult to locate the patrol or use supporting arms. After some time, patrol was located and an artillery mission was called in which routed PAVN. Three Marines were killed and 12 wounded, while PAVN losses were estimated to be 12 dead.

The three companies were within 1,000 meters of the South Vietnamese border by 1 March and were flown by helicopter to Vandegrift Combat Base on 3 March, officially ending operations in Laos. 2nd Battalion sustained eight killed and 33 wounded during the operation. For the record, all of the dead were listed as being killed in Quảng Trị Province, South Vietnam and for political reasons no reference was made about being in Laos. On 27 February Company D discovered a large PAVN weapons cache near Hill 1044 that included 629 rifles and over 100 crew-served weapons.

With the Marine objectives achieved by early March the operations plan called for the phased withdrawal of the Marines from the operational area, however this was hampered by bad weather. As 3/9 Marines withdrew to Firebase Cunningham on 3 March they were ambushed by a PAVN force and PFC Alfred M. Wilson would be posthumously awarded the Medal of Honor for his actions during the firefight. The operation concluded at 20:00 on 18 March as the last Marines arrived back at Vandegrift.

== Aftermath ==
Marine losses were 130 killed and 932 wounded, in return, the Marines reported 1,617 PAVN killed, the discovery of 500 tons of arms and munitions including 16 artillery pieces and 73 antiaircraft guns and denial of the valley as a PAVN staging area for the duration of the operation. The disruption of Base Area 611 was only temporary and the 101st Airborne Division would assault the area again two months later in Operation Apache Snow.

The 9th Marine Regiment and attached units, were awarded the Army Presidential Unit Citation for their performance in the operation. Four Medals of Honor, 6 Navy Crosses and 55 Silver Stars were awarded for the operation.

In 1971, the operation to clear Highway 9 from Đông Hà Combat Base to the Laotian border was named Operation Dewey Canyon II in an attempt to misdirect enemy attention towards the A Shau Valley instead of Tchepone, the actual objective of the combined campaign.

In April 1971, the Vietnam Veterans Against the War organized a protest rally in Washington, D.C., and named it Operation Dewey Canyon III.
