= 9th Marine Regiment =

- 9th Marines insignia
- Active: 1917–1919; 1943–1945; 1947–1949; 1952–1994; 2007–2015
- Country: United States of America
- Branch: United States Marine Corps
- Type: Infantry
- Part of: 3rd Marine Division; III Marine Expeditionary Force
- Nickname: "Striking Ninth"
- Engagements: World War II: Battle of Bougainville; Battle of Guam; Battle of Iwo Jima; Vietnam War: Operation Dewey Canyon; Operation Desert Storm

Commanders
- Notable commanders: Lemuel C. Shepherd; Gordon D. Gayle; Robert H. Barrow; Stephen G. Olmstead; Edwin H Simmons

The 9th Marine Regiment was an infantry regiment of the United States Marine Corps. Formed during World War II, it served until 1994, when it was deactivated during the post Cold War drawdown. Battalions of the Ninth Marine Regiment, but not the regiment itself, were reactivated from 2007 to 2014 as part of the Marine Corps' growth during the wars in Iraq and Afghanistan. The battalions have subsequently been deactivated again.

== Subordinate units ==
The regiment was composed of three infantry battalions and the regimental headquarters company:

- Headquarters Company, 9th Marines (HQ/9)
- 1st Battalion, 9th Marines (1/9)
- 2nd Battalion, 9th Marines (2/9)
- 3rd Battalion, 9th Marines (3/9)

== History ==
=== Early years ===
The 9th Marines were activated at Quantico, Virginia, on November 20, 1917. A month later, they deployed to Guantanamo Bay, Cuba and were attached to the 3rd Marine Brigade. That same month, they redeployed with the brigade to Galveston, Texas, in case of any German operation in the Caribbean or in Mexico. After World War I, the regiment was deactivated in Philadelphia, Pennsylvania, on April 25, 1919.

On December 1, 1925, the regiment was reactivated as a reserve organization whose mission was to train and maintain at a high degree of preparedness a group of “civilian” Marines.

=== World War II ===
The 3rd Battalion 9th Marines was reactivated at Camp Elliot, San Diego on February 12, 1942. In the following months, the rest of the battalions were also reactivated in early 1942, when the regiment officially re-formed. They were attached to the 3rd Marine Division at Camp Pendleton on September 16, 1943. The 9th Marines fought as part of the 3rd Marine Division on the islands of Bougainville, Guam, and Iwo Jima during WW2. The regiment was inactivated at Camp Pendleton on December 31, 1945.

=== Post World War II ===
The regiment was reformed on 17 March 1952 at Camp Pendleton, California and assigned to the 3d Marine Division. It was deployed during August 1953 to Camp Gifu, Japan and then in June 1955 to Okinawa. The regiment alternated between Japan and Okinawa in the 1950s.

=== Vietnam War ===
On March 8, 1965, the 9th Marine Regiment came ashore at Red Beach as the first conventional ground combat unit in South Vietnam, their mission was to defend the Da Nang Air Base. The first significant contact was in April 1965. The regimental headquarters arrived in country in July of that year.

The regiment saw action in Vietnam’s I Corps, primarily in Quảng Trị and Thừa Thiên Provinces, although a number of its earlier operations were also conducted in the southern I Corps provinces of Quảng Nam, Quảng Tín and Quảng Ngai. The 9th Marines served as a vital stop to the People's Army of Vietnam (PAVN) penetrations across the DMZ and from along the Ho Chi Minh Trail in Laos.

Some of its early operations included Operation Double Eagle, Macon and Prairie.

In April and May 1967, elements of the regiment defeated two PAVN regiments in The Hill Fights north of Khe Sanh Combat Base. In Operation Buffalo, elements of the 1st Battalion, 9th Marines made contact north of Con Thien with regimental-size PAVN forces in an engagement that lasted through May, accounting for over 1300 enemy dead.

The regiment successfully conducted Operation Dewey Canyon in the A Shau Valley. The 9th Regiment killed many PAVN, preventing another build-up and assault from Route 622 from Laos into South Vietnam as the PAVN had the year before during the Tet Offensive. Operation Dewey Canyon netted, among other weaponry, 16 artillery pieces, 73 anti-aircraft guns, hundreds of thousands of rounds of ammunition, 92 trucks, and hundreds of thousands of pounds of rice. This operation earned the regiment an Army Presidential Unit Citation. General Richard G. Stilwell wrote in his report to COMUSMACV General Creighton Abrams on Operation Dewey Canyon: “...this ranks with the most significant undertakings of the Vietnam conflict in the concept and results...”

The 9th Marines were part of the first redeployments from Vietnam in the summer of 1969. In July 1969 the regiment deployed to Camp Schwab, Okinawa and was reassigned in August 1969 to the 9th Marine Amphibious Brigade. The 9th MAB was then reassigned during November 1969 to the 3rd Marine Division (3 MarDiv).

=== Inactivation (1994) ===
The 9th Marines were inactivated in the budget cuts of 1994. A nucleus of staff and support personnel were maintained to reconstitute the regiment when needed. This was done in the belief that the necessary riflemen would be easily recruited in time of emergency or war.

On September 2, 1994, the 2nd Battalion was inactivated and redesignated the 2nd Battalion, 4th Marines and the 3rd Battalion was inactivated and re-designated the 3d Battalion, 4th Marines. On September 9, 1994, the 1st Battalion was inactivated and redesignated as the 2nd Battalion, 1st Marines.

=== Reactivation (2007) ===
As part of the effort to expand the Marine Corps to 202,000 Marines by the end of 2011, the battalions of the 9th Marines began reactivation in 2007. The 1st Battalion, 9th Marines (1/9) reactivated on April 18, 2007, the 2nd Battalion reactivated in July 2007, and the 3rd Battalion reactivated in May 2008. Each battalion falls under existing regimental headquarters — 1/9 with the 8th Marine Regiment, 2/9 with the 6th Marine Regiment and 3/9 with the 2nd Marine Regiment.

== Medal of Honor recipients ==
10 Marines from the 9th Marine Regiment have received the Medal of Honor:

- Thomas P. Noonan
- Thomas E. Creek
- John H. Leims
- Wilson D. Watson
- Louis H. Wilson
- Frank P. Witek
- Wesley L. Fox
- William D. Morgan
- Alfred M. Wilson
- John P. Bobo
- Kyle Carpenter
- Walter K. Singleton
- Harvey C. Barnum

== Regiment awards ==
The 9th Marines earned the following awards:

Navy Presidential Unit Citation

Army Presidential Unit Citation

Navy Unit Commendation

2 Navy Meritorious Unit Commendations

Marine Corps Expeditionary Medal

China Service Medal

Asiatic-Pacific Campaign Medal w/4 campaign stars

World War II Victory Medal

National Defense Service Medal w/1 Bronze Star

Armed Forces Expeditionary Medal

Vietnam Service Medal

Vietnam Gallantry Cross Unit Citation

Vietnam Civil Actions Unit Citation

== Notable former members ==
- Robert H. Barrow, commanding officer, later became 27th Commandant of the Marine Corps

== See also ==
- List of United States Marine Corps regiments
- Organization of the United States Marine Corps
- Augmenting the 18 embassy guards prior to the Fall of Saigon
