= 3rd Battalion, 9th Marines =

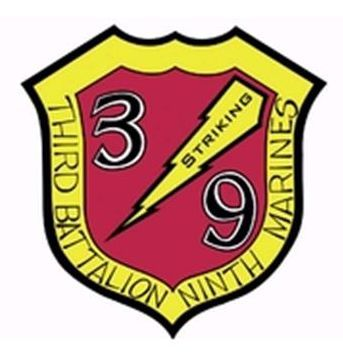
- 3/9 Insignia
- Active: 20 November 1917 – 12 August 1994; 21 May 2008 – August 2013
- Country: United States of America
- Branch: United States Marine Corps
- Type: Infantry Battalion
- Role: Locate, close with and destroy the enemy with fire and maneuver, and repel the enemy's assault with fire and close combat
- Part of: Deactivated
- Garrison/HQ: Camp Lejeune
- Nickname: Shadow Warriors
- Mottos: "Death in the Dark" (Vietnam Era), "Striking 3/9" (Post-Vietnam Era)
- Engagements: World War II: Battle of Bougainville; Battle of Guam; Battle of Iwo Jima; Vietnam War; Operation Desert Storm; Operation Restore Hope; War on terror: Operation Iraqi Freedom; Operation Enduring Freedom

Commanders
- Current commander: None

The 3rd Battalion, 9th Marines (3/9) is an infantry battalion of the United States Marine Corps. Formed during World War I it served until the early 1990s when it was redesignated as 3rd Battalion, 4th Marines (3/4) during a realignment and renumbering of the Marine Corps' infantry battalions, following the deactivation of the 9th Marine Regiment. The 3rd Battalion, 9th Marines was initially a subordinate unit of the 9th Marine Regiment, 3rd Marine Division, but was later operationally transferred to the 1st Marine Division as a subordinate unit of the 7th Marine Regiment where it remained until its redesignation as 3/4.

3/9 was reactivated under the 2nd Marine Division in May 2008 as the Marines expanded as a result of the continuing war on terror.

== Current units ==
The battalion comprised four infantry companies, one weapons company and a headquarters and service company:

- Headquarters & Service Company
- India Company
- Kilo Company
- Lima Company
- Mike Company
- Weapons Company

== History ==
On 20 November 1917, at Marine Barracks, Quantico, Virginia, the 3rd battalion 9th Marine Regiment was organized. With the end of hostilities, the need for the battalion evaporated, so the entire regiment embarked 10 April 1919 aboard USS Hancock for Philadelphia, where it arrived and unloaded 25 April. The same day, the unit officially disbanded.

=== World War II ===
3rd Battalion, 9th Marine Regiment was reactivated on 12 February 1942, at Camp Elliot, San Diego, California as part of the 2nd Marine Division. The battalion was formed by a nucleus of officers and Marines from the 2nd Marine Regiment. In September 1942, the battalion was relocated to Marine Corps Base Camp Pendleton and reassigned to the 3rd Marine Division. The battalion was initially deployed to Cape Paerata, New Zealand in February 1943 and then moved to Guadalcanal in July of that year.

3/9 participated in the following campaigns during World War Two: Bougainville, Northern Solomons, Guam, and Iwo Jima. At Iwo Jima, 3/9 had the distinction of making the only battalion size unsupported, non-illuminated night attack against the Japanese in the Pacific War. Attesting to the ferocity of combat on Iwo Jima, all 22 of the battalion's officers who landed on D-Day were killed or wounded by the end of the battle. For their service at Iwo Jima, the battalion received the Presidential Unit Citation. The battalion was disbanded on 31 October 1945.

=== Laotian crisis of 1962 ===
On 19 May 1962 the Battalion Landing Team 3/9 Marines began flying in to Udorn Royal Thai Air Force Base from Bangkok as part of a buildup of US forces in Thailand in response to the worsening situation of the Royal Lao Government in the Laotian Civil War. The Marines were then moved north to the town of Nong Khai where they conducted field training exercises with the Royal Thai Army and civic action with Thai civilians. On 1 July, with the situation in Laos stabilizing, the Marines were flown from Udorn to the Philippines and then on to Okinawa.

=== Vietnam War ===
3/9 became the first battalion-sized ground combat unit to be deployed to Vietnam when they landed on 8 March 1965 at Da Nang, South Vietnam. Over the course of the next four and a half years, the battalion operated from Da Nang, An Hoa and Quảng Trị and participated in over 40 combat operations, including Operation Double Eagle, Operation Buffalo and Operation Dewey Canyon. The battalion redeployed on 13 August 1969, after four years of continuous combat operations.

Kilo and India companies were deployed to Bien Hoa Air Base to provide ground support, for Marine Aircraft Group 12 (MAG-12) in May 1972. They remained at Bien Hoa until January 1973.

Kilo Co. 3/9 was deployed to Bien Hoa from Okinawa on 22 May 1972, India Co. 3/9 relieved Kilo Co. on 26 August 1972 and remained at Bien Hoa until 3 Feb 1973. The last U.S. Marine killed in action before the war ended at 08:00 on 28 January 1973 (local) was PFC Mark Miller who was killed on 26 January 1973, listed as a member of MGAG-12, he was in fact a member of India Company 3/9 on temporary assignment to MAG-12.

3/9 was the Battalion on Float at the time of Operation Frequent Wind, on Mount Fuji, Japan doing cold weather training when the call came. They had to be flown back to Okinawa and loaded onto USS Denver and were involved with the evacuation of the VIP's and refugees until the very end.

=== The 1980s and 1990s ===
During 1986 though 1987 3/9 was commanded by LtCol James L Jones who later became the Commandant of the Marine Corps, NATO Commander, and the National Security Adviser. During 1986 the battalion participated in the filming of Heartbreak Ridge in Camp Pendleton, California and Hamburger Hill while deployed to the Philippines. From March 1990 to April 1990 3/9 was deployed to Honduras, to train the Honduras Military to fight against Rebels from Nicaragua and El Salvador. During this time they were detached to the CIA who had a Base close to that border region. They were sent on patrols and participated when fired upon and they would defuse land mines placed around friendly villages who supported the Honduron Military. Participated in Operation Desert Shield between August 1990 and January 1991. Participated in Operation Desert Storm between January 1991 and March 1991. There they participated in the Battle of Kuwait International Airport. Participated in Operation Restore Hope between 1992 and 1993. Deactivated on 2 September 1994 and redesignated 3rd Battalion 4th Marines.

=== 2000s ===
On 7 December 2006, Headquarters Marine Corps released a message stating that 3rd Battalion, 9th Marines would be reactivated during 2008 as part of the continuing Global War on Terror.

On 20 May 2008, 3/9 was reactivated at Marine Corps Base Camp Lejeune, North Carolina under the 2nd Marine Division.

In July 2009, 3rd Battalion 9th Marines deployed to Iraq in support of Operation Iraqi Freedom. They came home within 4 months due to troop withdrawals and were the last active duty Infantry Battalion to deploy to Iraq.

In December 2010, 3rd Battalion 9th Marines deployed to Marjah, Helmand Province, Afghanistan in support of Operation Enduring Freedom. On 23 April 2011, while conducting combat operations in Helmand province, Afghanistan, LCpl Dominic Ciaramitaro and Sgt Sean Callahan were killed in action.

The Marines and Sailors of 3/9 were responsible for disrupting enemy operations and allowing the civilian populace to move about freely. Prior to departure, the area of operations was turned over to the Afghan National Army (ANA). The Marines and Sailors of 3rd battalion, 9th Marine Regiment returned to the United States in early July 2011.

In October 2012, 3rd Battalion 9th Marines deployed to Marjah, Helmand Province, Afghanistan in support of Operation Enduring Freedom, returning in May of 2013. One Marine KIA, LCpl Anthony J. Denier, died while engaging enemy forces on Dec 2, 2012. He is now buried at the Gerald Solomon Saratoga National Cemetery in upstate New York.

== Medal of Honor recipients ==
The Medal of Honor is the highest military decoration awarded by the United States. It is bestowed on a member of the United States armed forces who distinguishes himself or herself "... conspicuously by gallantry and intrepidity at the risk of his life above and beyond the call of duty while engaged in an action against an enemy of the United States ...". The following table contains the names of the men who were recipients of the Medal of Honor while serving in 3/9. They are listed in accordance to the "Date of Action" in which the MoH citation was made.

Name	Rank	Unit	Place	Date of action	Ref.
John P. Bobo	Second Lieutenant	Company I, 3rd Battalion, 9th Marines, 3rd Marine Division	Quang Tri Province, South Vietnam	25 March 1967	
Thomas E. Creek	Lance Corporal	Company I, 3rd Battalion, 9th Marines, 3rd Marine Division	Cam Lo, South Vietnam	13 February 1969	
Alfred M. Wilson	Private First Class	Company M, 3rd Battalion, 9th Marines, 3rd Marine Division	Quang Tri Province, South Vietnam	3 March 1969	

== Unit awards ==
A unit citation or commendation is an award bestowed upon an organization for the action cited. Members of the unit who participated in said actions are allowed to wear on their uniforms the awarded unit citation. 3rd Battalion, 9th Marines has been presented with the following awards:

Presidential Unit Citation with one bronze star
Joint Meritorious Unit Award
Navy Unit Commendation with two bronze service stars
Meritorious Unit Commendation with one bronze service star

Asiatic-Pacific Campaign Medal with four bronze stars

World War II Victory Medal
National Defense Service Medal (with two bronze stars)

Korean Service Medal with two silver stars
Marine Corps Expeditionary Medal

Armed Forces Expeditionary Medal

Vietnam Service Medal with two silver stars and one bronze stars

Southwest Asia Service Medal with two bronze stars

Korean Presidential Unit Citation

Vietnam Cross of Gallantry with Palm Streamer

Philippine Presidential Unit Citation
Kuwait Liberation Medal (Saudi Arabia)
Kuwait Liberation Medal (Kuwait)

== Notable former members ==
- Joe Fulks, served in Headquarters Company during World War II
- Cody Nickson, served in Lima Company during OIF and STA during OEF

== See also ==
- List of United States Marine Corps battalions
- Organization of the United States Marine Corps
