= Vandegrift Combat Base =

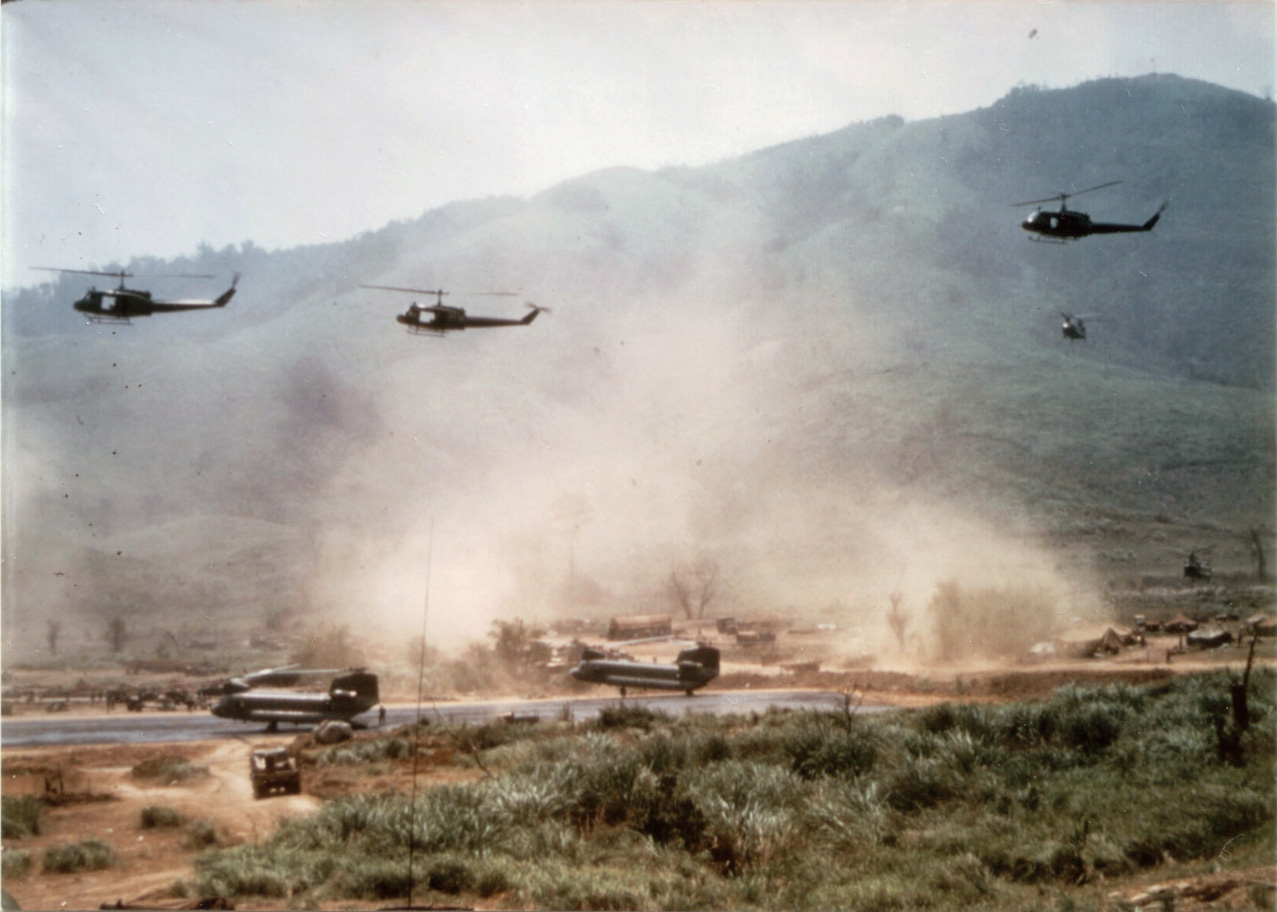
- April 4, 1968 1st Cavalry forces at LZ Stud

Site information
- Type: Army/Marines
- Condition: abandoned

Location
- Coordinates: 16.7°N 106.88°E

Site history
- Built: 1968
- In use: 1968-71
- Battles/wars: Vietnam War

Garrison information
- Occupants: 1st Cavalry Division; 9th Marines; ARVN 2nd Division

Vandegrift Combat Base (also known as FSB Vandegrift and LZ Stud) is a former U.S. Army, U.S. Marine Corps, and Army of the Republic of Vietnam (ARVN) base north of Ca Lu in Quảng Trị Province, Vietnam.

== History ==
=== 1968 ===
LZ Stud was originally established by the 1st Cavalry Division on Route 9 in early 1968 to support Operation Pegasus, the relief of Khe Sanh Combat Base. On 14 March engineer construction began on a 150 feet (46 m) x 2,500 feet (760 m) airstrip and a logistical complex at LZ Stud. On 24 March the quartering party moved to LZ Stud and began work on command and communications bunkers. By 29 March the strip was opened for C-7 Caribou aircraft. On 30 March the 11th Aviation Group moved to LZ Stud.

The base was later occupied by the 9th Marine Regiment, part of the 3rd Marine Division who renamed it Vandegrift Combat Base after Marine General Alexander Vandegrift.

=== 1969 ===
From January–March 1969 Vandegrift was used to support Operation Dewey Canyon, an offensive into the A Shau Valley south of the base.

On 9 April 1969 a Marine Sikorsky CH-53A Sea Stallion helicopter (BuNo 153738) of HMH-462 crashed into the logistics support area at Vandegrift triggering a large fire.

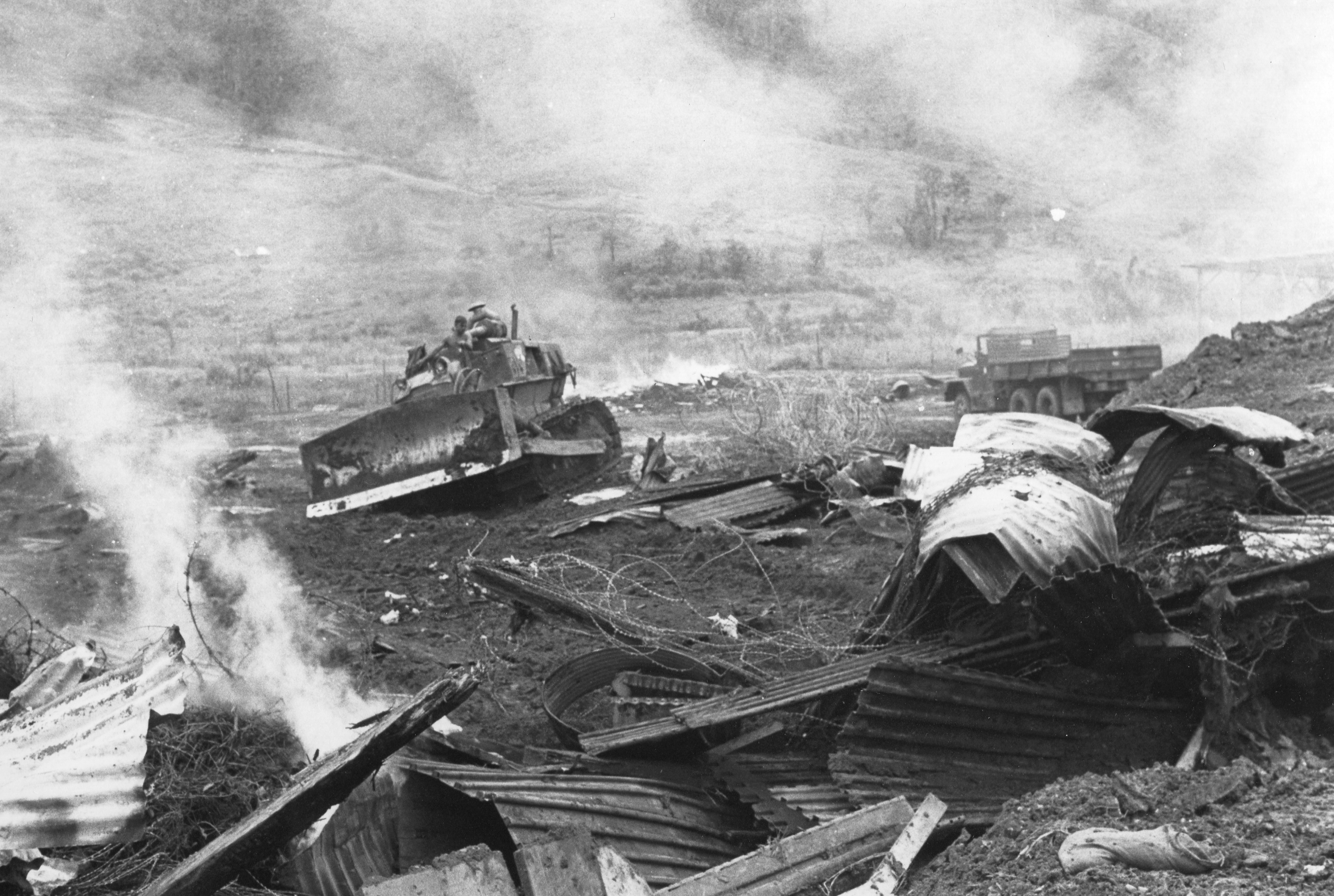
Destruction of Vandegrift Combat Base, 26 September 1969

In October 1969 the base was handed over to the ARVN 2nd Division who dismantled it and used it to reinforce Camp Carroll.

=== 1971 ===
In late January 1971 the base was reoccupied by the 1st Brigade, 5th Infantry Division in support of Operation Dewey Canyon II and Operation Lam Son 719.

On 21 March PAVN sappers attacked the base destroying 10,000 gallons of aviation fuel.

== Current use ==
The base is abandoned and turned over to farmland.
