= Deaths in May 1989 =

The following is a list of notable deaths in May 1989.

Entries for each day are listed alphabetically by surname. A typical entry lists information in the following sequence:

- Name, age, country of citizenship at birth, subsequent country of citizenship (if applicable), reason for notability, cause of death (if known), and reference.

== May 1989 ==
=== 1 ===
- Jim Barclay, 55, New Zealand Olympic field hockey player (1960).
- Antonio Janigro, 71, Italian cellist and conductor.
- Sally Kirkland, 76, fashion editor at Vogue and Life, emphysema.
- Scooter Lowry, 69, American child actor (Our Gang). (body found on this date)
- Marion Mack, 87, American film actress (The General), heart failure.
- Edward Ochab, 82, Polish communist politician, Chairman of the Polish Council of State.
- Binyamin Sasson, 85-86, Israeli politician, member of the Knesset (1951-1955).
- Muneyoshi Tokugawa, 91, Japanese army officer and politician.
- Douglass Watson, 68, American actor (Another World), heart attack.
- David Webster, 44, South African anti-apartheid activist, assassinated.

=== 2 ===
- Bennie Benjamin, 81, Virgin Islands–born American songwriter (Don't Let Me Be Misunderstood, Wheel of Fortune)).
- James Crabe, 57, American cinematographer (Rocky, The China Syndrome, The Karate Kid), complications of AIDS.
- Veniamin Kaverin, 87, Russian writer and dramatist.
- Charlie May, 90, Australian rules footballer.
- Gerald Scarpelli, 60–61, American mobster and hitman (Chicago Outfit), suicide.
- Giuseppe Siri, 82, Italian cardinal, Archbishop of Genoa.
- Virgil Stallcup, 67, American MLB player (Cincinnati Reds, St. Louis Cardinals).
- Maki Yūkō, 95, Japanese mountain climber.

=== 3 ===
- Sheikh Abbas, 76–77, Algerian diplomat and writer, rector of the Great Mosque of Paris.
- Walter Brödel, 63, German Olympic fencer (1952).
- Gordon Dailley, 77, Canadian-born British ice hockey player and Olympic gold medalist (1936).
- Christine Jorgensen, 62, American trans-gender woman, actress and singer, bladder and lung cancer.
- Aaron M. Kohn, 78, crime investigator and FBI agent.
- Muriel Ostriche, 92, American silent-screen actress.
- Roland Robinson, 82, British politician (Member of Parliament), and diplomat (Governor of Bermuda).
- William Squire, 72, Welsh actor (Callan).
- John Wiethe, 76, American NFL player (Detroit Lions).

=== 4 ===
- Adnan Khayr Allah, 49, Iraqi military officer and Saddam Hussein's brother-in-law, Minister of Defence, helicopter crash.
- Chalam, 59, Indian film actor (Mattilo Manikyam).
- Morris Copeland, 93, American economist (flow of funds analysis).
- Larry Fleisher, 58, American attorney and sports agent, founded the National Basketball Players Association, heart attack.
- John R. Heller Jr., 84, American director of the National Cancer Institute, known for the Tuskegee syphilis study.
- Herschel C. Loveless, 77, American politician, Governor of Iowa, lung cancer.
- James McKeown, 88, Irish missionary in the Gold Coast (Ghana), founded the Church of Pentecost.
- Ashutosh Mukhopadhyay, 68, Indian writer.
- Jacques Perrier, 60, French Olympic cross-country skier (1952).
- Lydia Pasternak Slater, 87, Soviet research chemist and poet.
- Jean-Marie Tjibaou, 53, French New Caledonian politician, leader of Kanak independence movement, assassinated.
- Evelle J. Younger, 70, American lawyer, Attorney General of California.

=== 5 ===
- Joe Batchelder, 90, American MLB player (Boston Braves).
- Frank Easton, 79, Australian cricketer.
- Jón Ingi Guðmundsson, 79, Icelandic Olympic water polo player (1936).
- Hermann Hölter, 89, German Olympic modern pentathlete (1928), Nazi German army general.
- Sister Mary Leo, 94, New Zealand religious sister, trained some of the world's best sopranos.
- Wolfgang Neuss, 65, German actor and Kabarett artist, cancer.
- Jennifer Hodge de Silva, 38, Canadian filmmaker.
- Eddie Scharer, 87, American NFL player (Detroit Panthers/Wolverines, Pottsville Maroons).
- Peter P. Stevens, 79, American football player and coach (Philadelphia Eagles, Temple Owls).
- Naval Tata, 84, Indian industrialist and philanthropist.
- Stefan E. Warschawski, 85, Russian-born American mathematician (conformal maps, minimal surfaces, harmonic functions).
- Don Wheeler, 73, American politician, member of the United States House of Representatives (1947-1955).

=== 6 ===
- Earl Blaik, 92, American football player and coach (United States Military Academy).
- Tally Brown, 64, American singer and actress.
- Adolfo Constanzo, 26, Cuban-American serial killer, drug dealer and cult leader, assisted suicide.
- Thakin Soe, 82–83, Burmese politician, founding member of the Communist Party of Burma.
- L. D. Weldon, 80–81, American track and field coach of decathletes.
- Ron McDonnell, 87, Republican member of the Montana Legislature.

=== 7 ===
- Lou Brock, 71, American NFL player (Green Bay Packers).
- Miranda Campa, 75, Swiss-Italian actress.
- Frank Cluskey, 59, Irish politician, leader of the Labour Party, cancer.
- Willie Covan, 91, American tap dancer, actor and vaudeville performer (The Duke Is Tops).
- Darío Echandía, 91, Colombian politician, acting president of Colombia, Colombian ambassador to the U.K.
- Earl J. Hamilton, 89–90, American historian.
- Mills Lane, 77, American banker (Citizens & Southern National Bank).
- Howie Moss, 69, American MLB player (New York Giants, Cincinnati Reds, Cleveland Indians).
- John Whittet, 63, American officer in the U.S. Navy, drowned.

=== 8 ===
- Anders Andersson, 60, Swedish politician, MP (since 1983), plane crash.
- Hendrik Allik, 88, Estonian politician (Estonian Communist Party).
- Felice Mario Boano, 85–86, Italian automobile designer and coachbuilder (Fiat).
- Mariga Guinness, 56, English-born architectural conservationist, co-founder of the Irish Georgian Society, heart attack.
- Andreas Hillgruber, 64, German historian, throat cancer.
- Tony Lucadello, 76, American professional baseball scout, suicide by shooting.
- John-Olof Persson, 50, Swedish politician, twice mayor of Stockholm, plane crash.
- Ruggero Maccari, 69, Italian screenwriter (Profumo di donna, La Famiglia).
- Rudolf Uhlenhaut, 82, British-German engineer (Mercedes-Benz).
- Bob Webb, 71, New Zealand cricketer.

=== 9 ===
- Karl Brunner, 73, Swiss economist.
- Timothy Farrell, 66, American actor (Jail Bait, The Violent Years, Glen or Glenda)
- Alex Fraser, 72, Canadian politician, member of the B.C. Legislative Assembly.
- Fred Halsted, 47, American gay pornographic film director and actor, suicide.
- Enrique Lucero, 68, Mexican actor (Canoa: A Shameful Memory).
- Devereaux Mytton, 64, Australian Olympic sailor (1956).
- Kenneth A. Roberts, 76, American politician, member of U.S. House of Representatives (1951-1965), heart failure.
- Keith Whitley, 34, American country music singer and songwriter (When You Say Nothing at All, I'm No Stranger to the Rain), alcohol poisoning.

=== 10 ===
- Wilhelm Bleckwenn, 82, Nazi German Wehrmacht general.
- Joseph Brennan, 88, American ABL basketballer (Brooklyn Visitations).
- Richard Green, 52, American teacher, New York City Schools Chancellor, cardiac arrest due to asthma.
- Dimitar Ilievski-Murato, 35, Macedonian mountaineer, first Macedonian to climb Mount Everest.
- Stewart Perowne, 87, British diplomat and archaeologist of the Middle East.
- Kalu Rinpoche, 84, Tibetan Buddhist lama and teacher.
- Woody Shaw, 44, American jazz trumpeter and bandleader, kidney failure.
- Hassler Whitney, 82, American mathematician (singularity theory), stroke.

=== 11 ===
- Vin Brown, 67, Australian rules footballer.
- Howard Francis Corcoran, 83, American attorney and district judge.
- Johan Schouten, 78, Dutch Olympic wrestler (1948).
- Xiao Wangdong, 78, Chinese Communist revolutionary and a lieutenant general of the People's Liberation Army.

=== 12 ===
- Arthur Hart, 83, Australian rules footballer.
- Paul Haynes, 79, Canadian NHL player (Montreal Maroons, Boston Bruins, Montreal Canadiens).
- Nicholas Wilder, 51–52, American art dealer, complications from AIDS.

=== 13 ===
- James Buchanan, 81, South African cricketer.
- Jack Grout, 79, American golfer.
- Charlie Mutton, 98, Australian politician.
- Vera Neferović, 82, Croatian Olympic discus thrower (1936).
- Bjørn Puggaard-Müller, 67, Danish film actor.
- Al Reiss, 80, American MLB player (Philadelphia Athletics).
- Tony Ries Sr., 75, South African Olympic wrestler (1948).
- Joanna Roos, 88, American actress and playwright.

=== 14 ===
- Marv Colen, 74, American basketball player.
- Nikifor Kalchenko, 83, Soviet politician.
- Joe Primeau, 83, Canadian professional ice hockey player.
- Hans Stubbe, 87, German agronomist and plant breeder.
- E. P. Taylor, 88, Canadian business tycoon, investor and philanthropist.

=== 15 ===
- Johnny Green, 80, American songwriter, conductor and pianist.
- Joe Hinson, 69, Australian rules footballer.
- Noel O'Brien, 56, Australian rules footballer.
- Kenneth Sellar, 82, English rugby union player and cricketer.
- Jack Shewchuk, 71, Canadian NHL player (Boston Bruins).
- Noriko Tsukase, 43, Japanese voice actress and singer, rectal cancer.

=== 16 ===
- Lamar Allen, 74, American college football player and coach, and Negro League baseball player.
- Fred Dean, 80, Australian rules footballer.
- Aharon Efrat, 78, Israeli politician, member of the Knesset (1974-1977).
- Ralph Gibson, 83, Australian communist organiser and writer.
- Josephine R. Hilgard, 83, American developmental psychologist, psychiatrist and psychoanalyst.
- Théodore Strawinsky, 82, Russian-Swiss painter.

=== 17 ===
- Ed Brett, 75, American NFL player (Chicago Cardinals, Pittsburgh Pirates).
- Good Rockin' Charles, 56, American blues harmonicist, singer and songwriter.
- Hallvard Eika, 68, Norwegian politician, member of the Norwegian Parliament.
- Walter Gross, 85, German actor.
- Ota Hofman, 61, Czech literature and screenwriter.
- Finn Juhl, 77, Danish architect, interior and industrial designer.
- Lucia Moholy, 95, Austro-Hungarian–born photographer and publications editor.
- József Remecz, 82, Hungarian Olympic discus thrower (1932).
- Specs Toporcer, 90, American Major League baseball player (St. Louis Cardinals), injuries sustained from a fall.
- Frank Vukosic, 74, American basketball player.

=== 18 ===
- Donald Hiss, 82, American legal secretary, younger brother of Alger Hiss.
- Hermann Höcherl, 77, German politician and lawyer, member of the Nazi Party.
- Ed McIlvenny, 64, Scottish footballer who represented the United States.
- Dorothy Ruth, 67, American daughter of US baseball player Babe Ruth and his mistress Juanita Jennings.
- Józef Szewczyk, 39, Polish footballer.
- Doris L. Thompson, 83, American politician.

=== 19 ===
- Anton Diffring, 72, German actor, cancer.
- Abel Herzberg, 95, Dutch lawyer and writer.
- John J. Muccio, 89, Italian-American diplomat, U.S. Ambassador to Guatemala, Iceland and South Korea.
- Gerd Oswald, 79, German director of American film and television, cancer.
- Yiannis Papaioannou, 79, Greek composer and teacher.
- Robert Webber, 64, American actor, Lou Gehrig's disease.

=== 20 ===
- Peter Evans, 38, American actor.
- Walter Heap, 67, American football player (Los Angeles Dons).
- Sir John Hicks, 85, British economist, Nobel Memorial laureate in Economic Sciences.
- Pavel Juráček, 53, Czech screenwriter and film director.
- Lyn Murray, 79, English-American composer, conductor and arranger of music, cancer.
- Warren G. Magnuson, 84, American lawyer and politician, President pro tempore of the United States Senate.
- Gilda Radner, 42, American actress, comedian, writer and singer, ovarian cancer.
- Mike Reinbach, 39, American Major League baseball player (Baltimore Orioles), car accident.
- Gōgen Yamaguchi, 80, Japanese martial artist, subarachnoid hemorrhage.

=== 21 ===
- Tito Colliander, 85, Finnish Eastern Orthodox Christian writer.
- Harry Cozart, 72, American Negro Leagues baseball player.
- Ena Stockley, 82, New Zealand Olympic swimmer (1928).
- Gerard Yantz, 71, American Olympic handball player (1936).
- Margot Zemach, 57, American illustrator of children's books, amyotrophic lateral sclerosis.

=== 22 ===
- Les Jones, 66, Australian rules footballer.
- Inge Limberg, 65, Swedish Olympic cross-country skier (1956).
- Carlton Massey, 59, American NFL footballer (Cleveland Browns, Green Bay Packers).
- Rush Rhees, 84, American philosopher.
- Robert Richardson Sears, 80, American psychologist.
- Bettina Somers, 84, Canadian painter.
- Karen Ulane, 47, American airline pilot, plane crash.

=== 23 ===
- Ansa Ikonen, 75, Finnish film and theatre actress.
- Ursula Knab, 59, German Olympic sprinter (1952).
- James Kay Thomas, 87, American lawyer and politician, Attorney General of West Virginia.
- George Thomas, 61, American NFL footballer (Washington Redskins, New York Giants).
- Georgy Tovstonogov, 73, Russian-Georgian theatre director, heart attack.
- Earle Wilson, 88, American triple-jumper and Olympian (1924).

=== 24 ===
- S. K. Dey, 82, Indian politician.
- Guus Dräger, 71, Dutch footballer and Olympian (1948).
- Virgil Geddes, 91-92, American playwright.
- Tom Harper, 86, American football player and coach.
- Steve McCall, 55, American jazz drummer.
- Tripti Mitra, 63, Indian actress.
- Henry Prior, 90, South African cricketer.
- Cyril Shiner, 81, British painter.
- Butch Simas, 80, American NFL player (Chicago Cardinals).

=== 25 ===
- Brigid Bazlen, 44, American film, television, and stage actress.
- John Brewis, 69, Scottish politician, MP (1959-1974).
- Ben H. Brown Jr., 75, American diplomat, U.S. Ambassador to Liberia, cancer.
- Ab DeMarco, 73, Canadian ice hockey player.
- Jean Despeaux, 73, French boxer and Olympic gold medalist (1936).
- Soma Wickremanayake, 74, Sri Lankan educator and politician, member of the Ceylonese Parliament.

=== 26 ===
- Pierre Everaert, 55, French racing cyclist.
- Clifford Grainge, 61, English cricketer.
- Eugene Keogh, 81, American politician, member of the United States House of Representatives (1937-1967).
- Wingate H. Lucas, 81, American politician, member of the United States House of Representatives (1947-1955).
- Phineas Newborn Jr., 57, American jazz pianist, growth on lungs.
- Don Revie, 61, English international footballer and manager, motor neurone disease.
- Kazuko Takatsukasa, 59, elder sister to Emperor Akihito of Japan, heart failure.
- Albert Woodbury, 79, American composer (They Shoot Horses, Don't They?).

=== 27 ===
- Jerry Anderson, 35, American NFL footballer (Cincinnati Bengals, Tampa Bay Buccaneers), drowned.
- Emmet Lanigan, 79, Australian cricketer.
- Jess Sweetser, 87, American golfer.
- Arseny Tarkovsky, 81, Russian poet and translator.

=== 28 ===
- Wally Anderzunas, 43, American basketballer (Cincinnati Royals).
- Mike Corgan, 70, American football player (Detroit Lions) and coach (Nebraska Cornhuskers).
- George Hague, 73, American Olympic rower (1936).
- Camille Médy, 86, French Olympic cross-country skier (1924, 1928).
- Abbas Nalbandian, 39–40, Iranian playwright, suicide.
- Iván Palazzese, 27, Italian-Venezuelan motorcycle racer, racing accident.
- Baltasar Lopes da Silva, 82, Portuguese writer, poet and linguist, cerebrovascular disease.
- John M. Systermans, Belgian-missionary and priest.
- Muttathu Varkey, 76, Indian novelist, short story writer and poet.

=== 29 ===
- John Oliver Andrews, 92, British WWI flying ace and RAF officer.
- Nora Barlow, 103, British botanist and geneticist, granddaughter of Charles Darwin.
- John Cipollina, 45, American guitarist, alpha-1 antitrypsin deficiency.
- George C. Homans, 78, American sociologist, founder of behavioral sociology, heart ailment.
- Joseph Van Ingelgem, 77, Belgian international footballer.
- Donald L. Katz, 81, American chemist and chemical engineer.
- Tariq Mehmood, 50, Pakistani military officer of Pakistan Army, parachute accident.
- Giuseppe Patanè, 57, Italian opera conductor, heart attack.
- William Sobey, 61, Canadian businessman.
- Bob Waters, 50, American footballer, Lou Gehrig's disease.

=== 30 ===
- Jane Fauntz, 78, American swimmer and diver, and Olympic medalist, leukemia.
- Frank Holmes, 89, Australian rules footballer.
- James Harry Lacey, 72, British Royal Air Force fighter pilot in World War II.
- Thoreau MacDonald, 88, Canadian illustrator, graphic and book designer, and artist.
- Zinka Milanov, 83, Croatian operatic dramatic soprano, stroke.
- Claude Pepper, 88, American politician, member of the U.S. House of Representatives, stomach cancer.
- Les Peterson, 80, American NFL player (Green Bay Packers, Staten Island Stapletons, Brooklyn Dodgers).

=== 31 ===
- Heinz Hasselberg, 75, German cyclist and Olympian (1936).
- Willi Horn, 80, German Olympic sprint canoeist (1936).
- Edward Hubbard, 51, English architectural historian, ankylosing spondylitis.
- C. L. R. James, 88, Trinidadian historian, journalist and Marxist writer, chest infection.
- Owen Lattimore, 88, American Orientalist and writer.
- Frank Nolan, 73, Australian rules footballer.
- Raisa Orlova, 70, Russian writer and American studies scholar.
- G. Vanmikanathan, 88, Indian scholar and author.

=== Unknown date ===
- John Sutton, 60–61, Irish hurler.
