= L/CPL Thomas P. Noonan Jr. Playground =

Park in Sunnyside, Queens

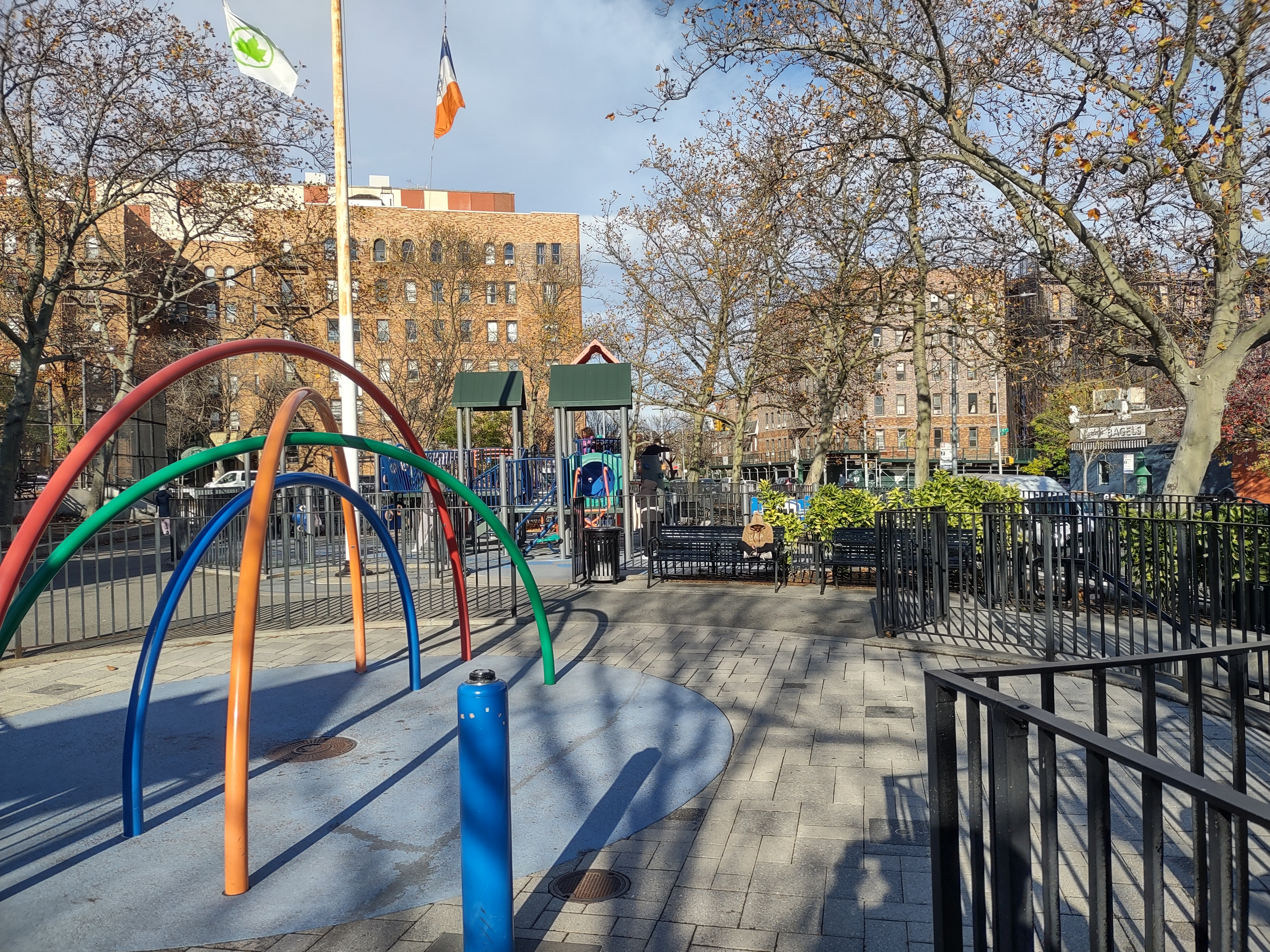
- The playground's rainbow spray shower and flagpole in 2024
- Interactive map of L/CPL Thomas P. Noonan Jr. Playground
- Type: Playground
- Location: Sunnyside, Queens, New York City, US
- Coordinates: 40.7411°N 73.9225°W
- Area: 1.05 acres (0.42 ha)
- Created: 1937
- Operator: New York City Department of Parks and Recreation
- Status: Open

L/CPL Thomas P. Noonan Jr. Playground is a 1.05-acre (0.42 ha) playground in the Sunnyside neighborhood of Queens, New York City, United States. Operated by the New York City Department of Parks and Recreation (NYC Parks), it occupies the block bounded by 42nd and 43rd Streets and Greenpoint and 47th Avenues. The playground opened in 1937 as Thomson Hill Park and was renamed in 1996 for Thomas P. Noonan Jr., a United States Marine raised in nearby Woodside who was posthumously awarded the Medal of Honor for his actions in the Vietnam War.

The park's rainbow spray shower has given it the local nickname "Rainbow Park". Its facilities include separate play areas for younger and older children, the spray shower, basketball and handball courts, public restrooms, and a dog run. The playground was rebuilt in a roughly $2 million reconstruction completed in 2015, which added an inscribed granite base to its flagpole honoring Noonan and a plaque naming four other Sunnyside residents killed in Vietnam. A $2.5 million dog run opened in 2024. It has also served as a venue for community and cultural events.

== Description ==
The playground occupies a 1.05-acre (0.42 ha) block in Sunnyside, bounded by 42nd and 43rd Streets and Greenpoint and 47th Avenues. It has separate play areas for children aged two to five and five to twelve, swings, and a rainbow spray shower, together with basketball courts, handball courts, public restrooms, and a dog run.

Near the center of the playground, an inscribed granite base at the foot of the flagpole commemorates Noonan, and an adjacent plaque honors four other Sunnyside residents killed in the Vietnam War: James Joseph Owens, Donald Charles Breuer, Thomas John Riley, and Edward Walter Corcoran.

== History ==
=== Thomson Hill Park ===
Calls for a public park in the growing Thomson Hill section of Sunnyside date to at least 1929, when a resident wrote to a local newspaper urging one. At an August 1930 meeting of the Anoroc Democratic Club, a member reported that Queens Borough President George U. Harvey had promised to seek a Board of Estimate appropriation for a park in the Thomson Hill section. NYC Parks acquired the site on December 18, 1936, as part of Thomson Hill Park. Earlier that year, the department's choice of the Greenpoint Avenue location had drawn local criticism that the site was too expensive, at $82,000 ($1.45 million in 2024), when cheaper ones were available, and that its rocky ground would be costly to clear. Parks commissioner Robert Moses defended it as nearly twice as large and better located than the alternative. Like most of the city's park projects of the era, it was built with New Deal work-relief labor, principally through the Works Progress Administration. The playground opened on October 26, 1937. A Department of Parks press release that day described the new playground, at 43rd Street between Greenpoint and 47th Avenues, as equipped with swings, see-saws, slides, playhouses, and horizontal bars and ladders, along with a rectangular wading pool encircled by an oval roller-skating track, handball courts, and a large play area for softball, with shade trees and concrete benches around its perimeter.

In 1958, the park was described as containing a playground, wading pool, table tennis equipment, and an ice skating area as well as courts for basketball, handball, paddle tennis, and volley ball.

By the late 1960s the playground had suffered years of vandalism. In 1967, the Department of Parks said it would ask the city for $50,000 to redesign and rehabilitate the playground, one of two vandalized North Queens playgrounds targeted for repair. City Councilman Francis X. Smith and local residents pressed for the work. A June 1971 New York Times article on narcotics in Sunnyside described the park, which it called "an old, pitted park at 43d Street and Greenpoint Avenue", as one of two centers of the neighborhood's drug traffic. Joan McDougall, president of the Sunnyside–Long Island City–Woodside Civic Association, said the park had been "unusable after dusk", when its 8-foot (2.4 m) hedges gave cover for dealing. The community had cut the hedges down about a year earlier so that the police could see inside. A $350,000 rehabilitation of the park was proposed in the city's capital budget in 1974.

=== Renaming and reconstruction ===
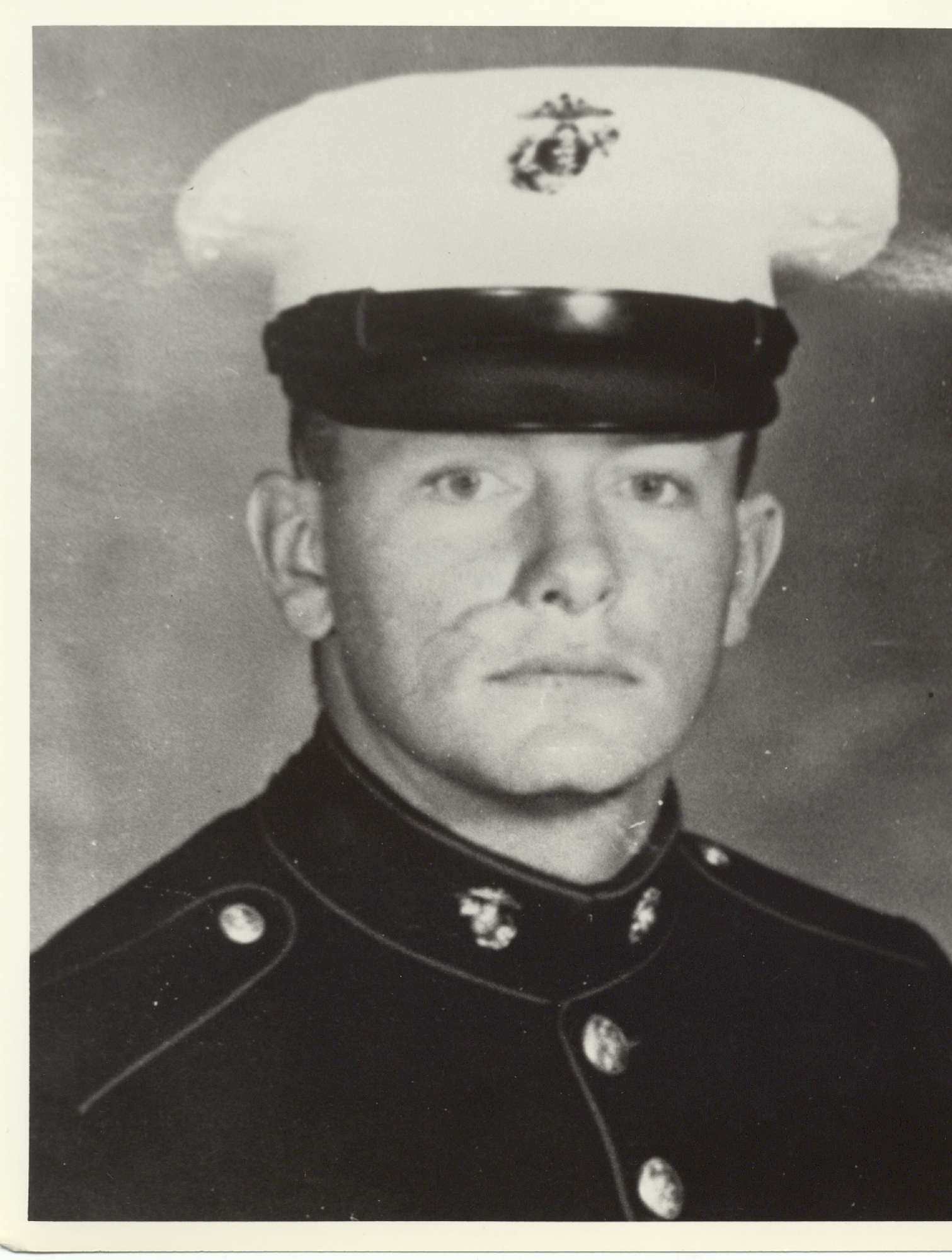
Thomas P. Noonan Jr., the Marine and Medal of Honor recipient for whom the playground was renamed in 1996

On May 14, 1996, the playground was renamed for Thomas P. Noonan Jr., a Marine who had grown up in Woodside. Born in Brooklyn, Noonan graduated from Hunter College in 1966 and enlisted in the Marine Corps Reserve in 1967. Serving as a lance corporal with Company G, 2nd Battalion, 9th Marines, 3rd Marine Division, he was killed on February 5, 1969, in Quảng Trị province while dragging a wounded Marine to safety under North Vietnamese fire, and was posthumously awarded the Medal of Honor. Noonan and his boyhood friend Robert E. O'Malley, who were in the same kindergarten class at Public School 76 in Woodside, both received the Medal of Honor for their service in Vietnam. Noonan is also commemorated by the nearby Thomas P. Noonan Jr. Department of Veterans Affairs Outpatient Clinic in Sunnyside, as designated by Congress in 2004. The Thomson Hill Park name continued to appear in local coverage after the renaming, including a 2000 Newsday report on the playground's renovation and a 2004 arts listing.

The city rebuilt the playground in 2000 in a $760,000 renovation. It was closed for about ten months and reopened at the end of May 2000 with modular play equipment, new fencing incorporating an ornamental eagle medallion, resurfaced basketball and handball courts, and new plantings and paving. Parks Commissioner Henry Stern led the reopening.

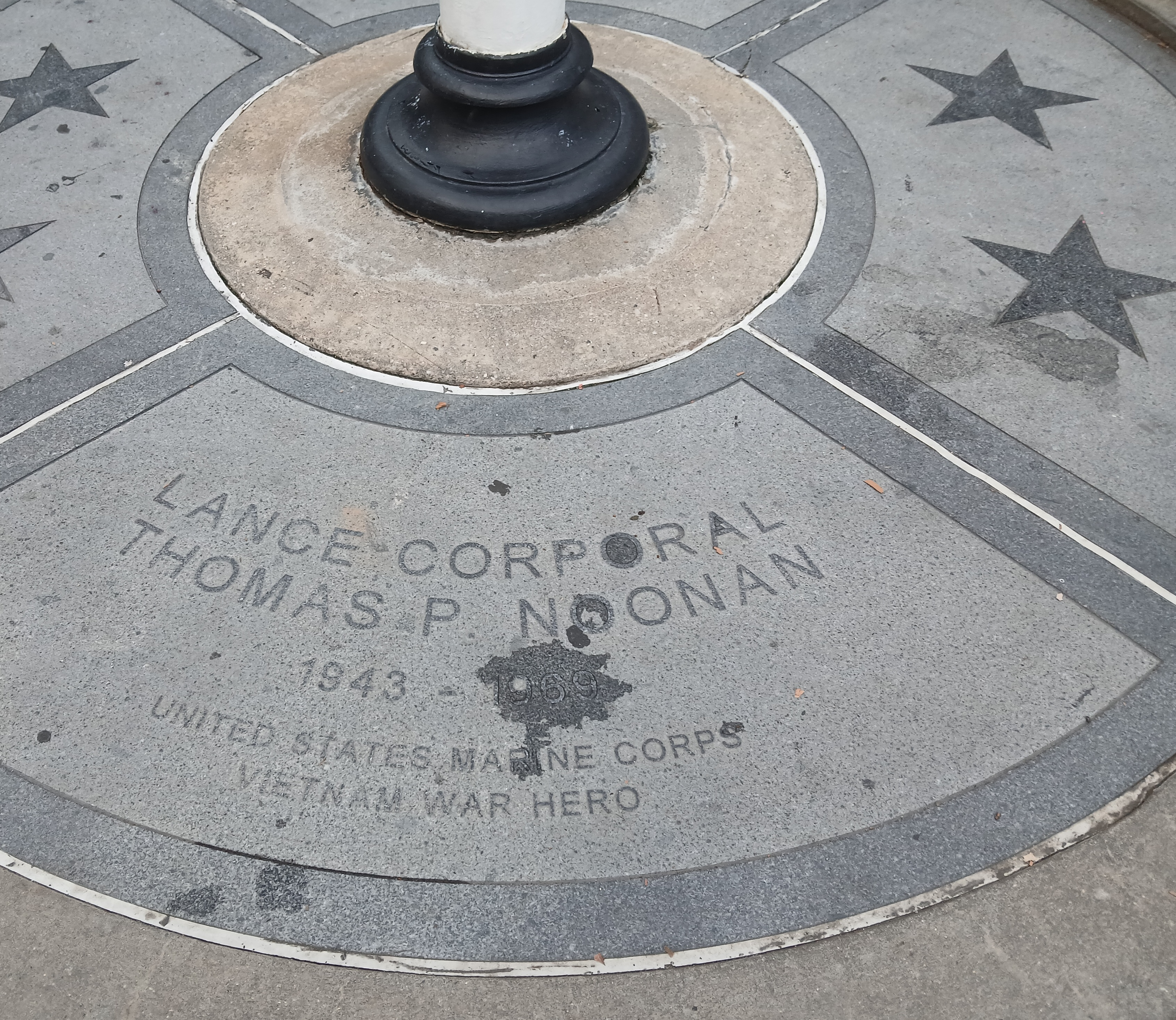
The inscribed granite base at the foot of the playground's flagpole, commemorating Lance Corporal Thomas P. Noonan

A subsequent reconstruction, funded with roughly $2 million secured by City Council member Jimmy Van Bramer, was completed in 2015, two months ahead of schedule. It added brightly colored, accessible play equipment, additional swings, a new rainbow spray shower, seating, and improved drainage and lighting, and rebuilt the main entrance. As part of the project, an inscribed granite base was added to the playground's flagpole in memory of Noonan, together with a plaque, championed by Community Board 2 chairman Joe Conley, honoring four other Sunnyside residents who had died in Vietnam. The reopening was attended by Van Bramer, Parks Commissioner Mitchell J. Silver, and State Senator Michael Gianaris. The playground's basketball and handball courts were reconstructed in a separate $200,000 project, funded by Mayor Bill de Blasio, between November 2015 and February 2016, completing a roughly $2.2 million overall renovation.

=== Dog run and later years ===
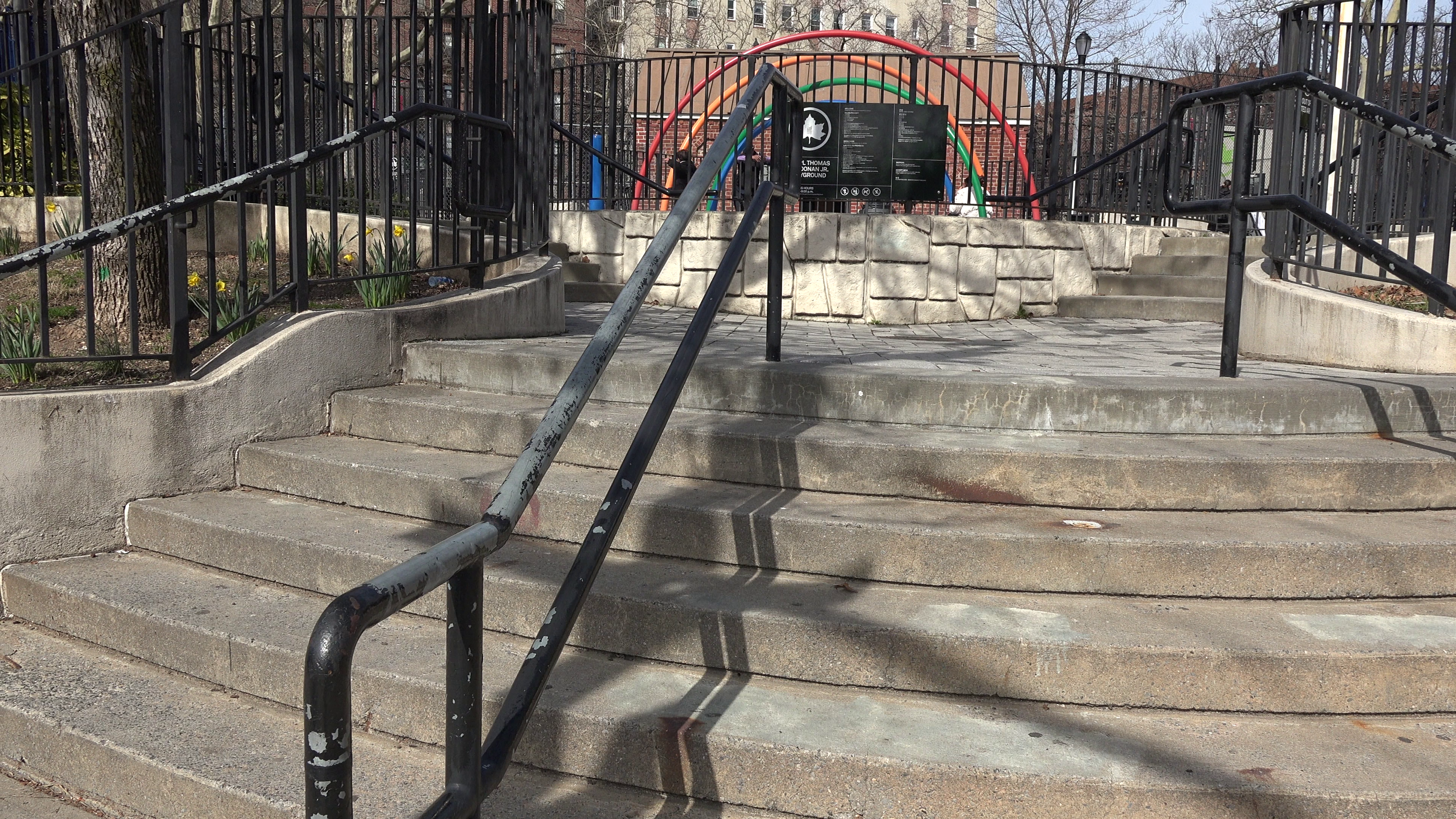
The playground's stepped entrance in 2024, with a rainbow spray-shower arch visible beyond the fence

In 2018, Van Bramer secured $2.5 million in mayoral funding to overhaul a run-down corner of the park at Greenpoint Avenue and 42nd Street, which local coverage described as a spot where homeless people congregated. The money was initially intended to expand the children's playground there, but was redirected to a dog run after a volunteer group, the Friends of Noonan Park Dog Run, advocated for one. Construction began in 2023, and the dog run opened in August 2024, its completion overseen by Van Bramer's successor on the City Council, Julie Won. Alongside the 1,500-square-foot dog run, with a separate 770-square-foot area for smaller dogs, the project reconstructed the park's seating area with new benches, plantings, and lighting.

Soon after the dog run opened, the New York Post reported complaints that a group of homeless men had been living in the playground, bathing in the children's spray shower and using drugs, and that the women's restroom had been closed as a result. Won, whose council district includes the playground, called people sleeping in parks "a pervasive citywide issue" tied to the city's shortage of affordable housing, and said her office was working with residents on recommendations to build more parks. In October 2024, a man whom Won described as homeless and known in the community was found dead in the playground. Police said the death appeared to result from natural causes, with no criminality suspected.

== Events and community use ==
Under its Thomson Hill name, the park was an active site in the city's Department of Parks recreation program. Its youth basketball team, the Thomson Hill Panthers, played in the borough's playground basketball tournaments, and by 1948 the site had a Parks Department director. In 1950, children from the playground performed a Dutch dance in the department's citywide summer folk-dance series.

The park also served as a venue for neighborhood events. From the mid-1980s into the 2010s the Thalia Spanish Theatre presented free outdoor music, dance, and zarzuela performances celebrating Spanish and Latino culture at the park, in a summer series billed over the years as "Concerts Under the Stars" and "Thalia Al Aire Libre". In the late 1980s, Community Board 2 organized National Night Out anti-crime gatherings there, opened by the Sunnyside Drum and Bugle Corps.

In the 2010s and 2020s, the playground hosted further community gatherings and outdoor film screenings. The Turkish Cultural Center of Queens held a public Ramadan celebration at the park in 2012. In April 2021, residents gathered there for a vigil, organized by two candidates for City Council, honoring the Sikh American victims of the 2021 Indianapolis FedEx shooting, four of the eight people killed in the attack. The park has also hosted free outdoor film screenings, including a local-filmmaker series presented by the Sunnyside business improvement district in 2019 and, in the 2020s, screenings in NYC Parks' Movies Under the Stars series.
