= Rosemary R. Gunning =

American lawyer and politician (1905–1997)

Member of the New York State Assembly from the 34th district
- In office January 1, 1969 – December 31, 1972
- Preceded by: Thomas P. Cullen
- Succeeded by: Joseph F. Lisa

Member of the New York State Assembly from the 37th district
- In office January 1, 1973 – December 31, 1976
- Preceded by: Samuel D. Wright
- Succeeded by: Clifford E. Wilson

Personal details
- Born: February 7, 1905 Brooklyn, New York City, U.S.
- Died: October 4, 1997 (aged 92) Roslyn, New York, U.S.
- Cause of death: Liver cancer
- Party: Conservative
- Spouse: Lester Moffett (m. 1946)
- Education: Brooklyn Law School (LLB)
- Profession: Lawyer, politician

Rosemary R. Gunning (February 7, 1905 – October 4, 1997) was an American lawyer and politician from New York. A founding member of the Conservative Party of New York State, she served in the New York State Assembly from 1969 to 1976, representing Queens. She was the first woman elected to the State Assembly from Queens.

== Early life and education ==
Gunning was born on February 7, 1905, in Brooklyn, New York City. She grew up in a family with an active interest in church and community work; one of her grandfathers had been a voluntary fire chief in Brooklyn when it was still a separate city.

She attended St. Brigid's School and Richmond Hill High School, graduating in 1922. She then entered Brooklyn Law School, one of only ten women in a class of 600, and graduated with an LL.B. in 1927. She was admitted to the New York State Bar in 1930.

== Legal career ==
After graduating from law school, Gunning practiced law in New York City. She worked for a Manhattan and Long Island law firm during the Great Depression. She then served as an attorney for the Department of the Army from 1942 to 1953.

She married Lester Moffett in 1946 and they lived in Ridgewood, Queens. She continued to use her maiden name professionally.

== Early political activism ==
Gunning entered the New York political scene as a Democrat and later joined the Conservative Party.

In the early 1960s, she became a leader in the fight against forced desegregation busing in New York City schools. She served as executive secretary of the Parents and Taxpayers Coordinating Council, a coalition of about 50 organizations opposed to the involuntary transfer of children from their neighborhood schools. In September 1964, she led a protest boycott that kept a quarter of the city's school system's students home.

In 1962, she was a founding member of the Conservative Party of New York.

== 1965 City Council campaign ==
In November 1965, Gunning ran on the Conservative ticket for President of the City Council, as part of a citywide ticket headed by mayoral candidate William F. Buckley Jr. She was defeated by Democrat Frank D. O'Connor.

== New York State Assembly ==
In 1967, Gunning was a delegate to the New York State Constitutional Convention.

In November 1968, she was elected with Republican endorsement to the New York State Assembly, becoming the first woman elected to the Assembly from Queens. She was one of the first two Conservatives to win an elective state office.

Gunning served four two-year terms in the Assembly. She represented the 34th district from 1969 to 1972, and the 37th district from 1973 to 1976.

During her tenure, she earned the grudging respect of more liberal colleagues for her careful and thorough approach to legislation. Although strongly identified with the Conservative Party, she made up her own mind on issues. She argued fervently for the Equal Rights Amendment and against abortion. In 1976, she surprised many Republicans with a strong defense of a bill sponsored by liberal Democrat Marie Runyon that prohibited anyone other than a physician from internally examining a prison inmate.

=== Major achievements ===
- Sponsored the legislation that created the New York City Housing Court.
- Supported bills for school decentralization.
- Helped to place 3,982 local homes on the National Register of Historic Places, making Ridgewood one of the largest federal historic districts in the nation.

== Retirement and death ==
On June 7, 1976, at the age of 71, Gunning announced she would not seek a fifth term in the Assembly. She told colleagues, "I'm sorry about it, but it's time to step down. I'll miss it. After all, you're in the action."

After retiring from the Assembly, she remained active in legal, political, and community organizations. She served on Community Board 5, the Board of the Ridgewood Property Owners and Civic Association, and the Greater Ridgewood Restoration Corporation. She also continued to serve as a member of the Advisory Council to the Housing Part of the Civil Court for more than two decades.

Gunning died on October 4, 1997, at the age of 92, at the home of one of her nieces in Roslyn, New York, of liver cancer.

== Legacy ==
In 1997, Council Member Thomas V. Ognibene funded the reconstruction of a playground in Ridgewood, which was named Rosemary's Playground in her honor. The playground is located in the Ridgewood neighborhood on the block bounded by Woodbine, Woodward, Madison, and Fairview Avenues.

New York State Assembly
Preceded by Thomas P. Cullen	Member of the New York State Assembly from the 34th district 1969–1972	Succeeded by Joseph F. Lisa
Preceded by Samuel D. Wright	Member of the New York State Assembly from the 37th district 1973–1976	Succeeded by Clifford E. Wilson
