= Samantha Kattan =

American politician

Member of the New York State Assembly from the 37th district
- Assuming office January 1, 2027
- Succeeding: Claire Valdez

Personal details
- Born: 1987 or 1988 (age 38–39) Austin, Texas, U.S.
- Party: Democratic
- Other political affiliations: Democratic Socialists of America (Note: The Democratic Socialists of America (DSA) are not a registered political party. Instead, they are a political organization for those with democratic socialist ideologies.)
- Education: Boston University (BA); University of Texas at Austin (MS)

Samantha Maria Kattan (born 1987/1988) is an American politician who is a member-elect of the New York State Assembly for the 37th District.

== Early life and career ==
Kattan is a native of Austin, Texas, and a first-generation American with her mother being from Mexico and her father being from Syria. She graduated from Boston University with a Bachelor of Arts in sociology then worked as an art interpreter at the Institute of Contemporary Art, Boston and launched "Advice & Banners," an art project spreading advice and motivational messages. She then graduated from University of Texas at Austin with a Master of Science in community and regional planning in August 2014.

Kattan works for the Urban Homesteading Assistance Board.

== New York State Assembly ==
Kattan announced her campaign for the 37th district of the New York State Assembly, looking to succeed incumbent Claire Valdez who successfully ran for the U.S. House. Valdez, Zohran Mamdani, NYC-DSA, DRUM Beats, and the Working Families Party among others endorsed her campaign. Kattan won the June 2026 primary with 66.87% of the vote and was unopposed in the general election.

== Personal life ==
Kattan moved to Brooklyn in 2014 and had lived in Ridgewood for "about six years" as of February 2026.
