= Thomas P. Noonan Jr. =

United States Marine Corps Medal of Honor recipient

Thomas Patrick Noonan Jr.
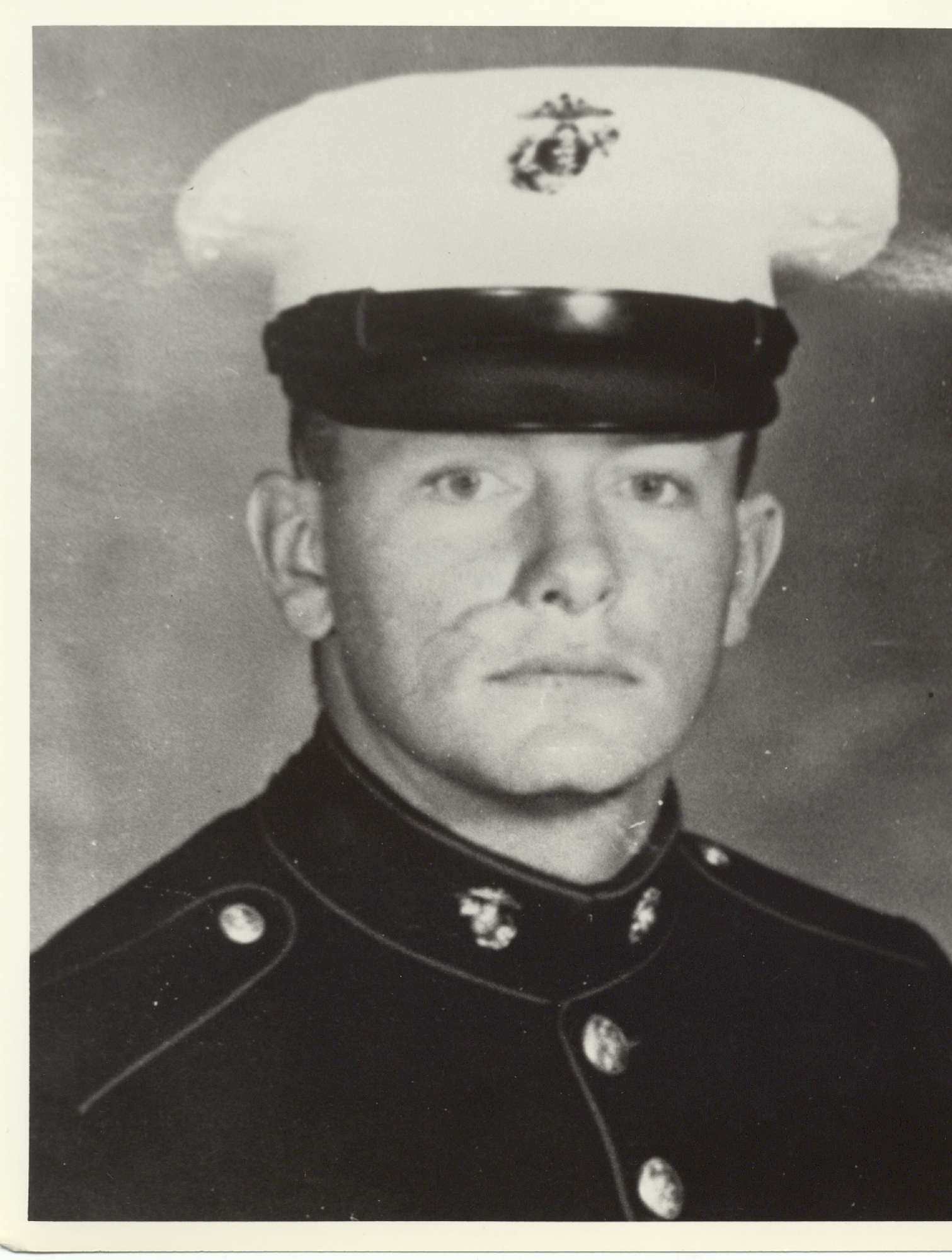
- Thomas Patrick Noonan Jr., posthumous Medal of Honor recipient
- Born: November 18, 1943; Brooklyn, New York, U.S.
- Died: February 5, 1969 (aged 25) near Vandegrift Combat Base, Quang Tri Province, South Vietnam
- Burial place: Calvary Cemetery, Woodside, New York
- Military career
- Allegiance: United States of America
- Branch: United States Marine Corps
- Service years: 1967–1969
- Rank: Lance Corporal
- Units: Company G, 2nd Battalion, 9th Marines, 3rd Marine Division
- Conflicts: Vietnam War: Operation Dewey Canyon †
- Awards: Medal of Honor; Purple Heart

Thomas Patrick Noonan Jr. (November 18, 1943 – February 5, 1969) was a United States Marine who was posthumously awarded the United States' highest military decoration — the Medal of Honor — for heroism during February 1969 in Vietnam.

== Biography ==
Noonan was born on November 18, 1943, in Brooklyn, New York. He graduated from Grover Cleveland High School in Ridgewood, New York in June 1961 and attended Hunter College in the Bronx, New York, graduating with a B.A. degree in Physical Education in June 1966. Coincidentally, he grew up with Sergeant Robert Emmett O’Malley, who would also be awarded the Medal of Honor in Vietnam. The two attended school and church together and were friends throughout childhood. After Noonan's death in Vietnam, O'Malley remained in contact with the Noonan family and visited Noonan's mother every year on Memorial Day.

He enlisted in the U. S. Marine Corps Reserve in Brooklyn, New York on December 26, 1967, and was subsequently discharged to enlist in the Regular Marine Corps on January 31, 1968.

Private Noonan completed recruit training with the 3rd Recruit Training Battalion, Marine Corps Recruit Depot Parris Island, South Carolina in April 1968, and was promoted to private first class on April 1, 1968.

Transferred to the Marine Corps Base Camp Lejeune, North Carolina, he underwent individual combat training with the 1st Battalion, 1st Infantry Training Regiment.

Ordered to the Republic of Vietnam in July 1968, he was assigned duty as mortar man with H&S Company, 2nd Battalion, 27th Marines, 1st Marine Division (Rein), FMF. In August, he was reassigned to the 3rd Marine Division where he saw combat as a rifleman, M-79 Man with Company G, 2nd Battalion, 9th Marines. He was promoted to Lance Corporal on January 1, 1969.

Noonan was killed in action on February 5, 1969, while participating in action against the enemy during Operation Dewey Canyon south of Vandegrift Combat Base in Quang Tri Province.

== Decorations ==
A complete list of his medals and decorations include: the Medal of Honor, Purple Heart, Army Presidential Unit Citation, National Defense Service Medal, the Vietnam Service Medal with two bronze stars, and the Republic of Vietnam Campaign Medal.

Medal of Honor		Purple Heart
National Defense Service Medal	Vietnam Service Medal with two bronze stars	Republic of Vietnam Campaign Medal

== Medal of Honor citation ==
The President of the United States in the name of The Congress takes pride in presenting the MEDAL OF HONOR posthumously to

LANCE CORPORAL THOMAS P. NOONAN, JR.
UNITED STATES MARINE CORPS

for service as set forth in the following CITATION:

For conspicuous gallantry and intrepidity at the risk of his life above and beyond the call of duty while serving as a Fire Team Leader with Company G, Second Battalion, Ninth Marines, Third Marine Division, in operations against the enemy in Quang Tri Province in the Republic of Vietnam. On February 5, 1969, Company G was directed to move from a position which they had been holding southeast of the Vandergrift Combat Base in A Shau Valley to an alternate location. As the Marines commenced a slow and difficult descent down the side of the hill, made extremely slippery by the heavy rains, the leading element came under a heavy fire from a North Vietnamese Army unit occupying well-concealed positions in the rocky terrain. Four men were wounded, and repeated attempts to recover them failed because of the intense hostile fire. Lance Corporal Noonan moved from his position of relative security and, maneuvering down the treacherous slope to a location near the injured men, took cover behind some rocks. Shouting words of encouragement to the wounded men to restore their confidence, he dashed across the hazardous terrain and commenced dragging the most seriously wounded man away from the fire-swept area. Although wounded and knocked to the ground by an enemy round, Lance Corporal Noonan recovered rapidly and resumed dragging the man toward the marginal security of a rock. He was however, mortally wounded before he could reach his destination. His heroic actions inspired his fellow Marines to such aggressiveness that they initiated a spirited assault which forced the enemy soldiers to withdraw. Lance Corporal Noonan's indomitable courage inspiring initiative and selfless devotion to duty upheld the highest traditions of the Marine Corps and the United States Naval Service. He gallantly gave his life for his country.

/S/ RICHARD M. NIXON

== In memory ==
The name Thomas P. Noonan Jr. is inscribed on the Vietnam Veterans Memorial ("The Wall") on Panel 33W Line 067.

Noonan has a playground named in his honor in Sunnyside, Queens, NY.

The Thomas P. Noonan Jr. VA Community Clinic in Sunnyside, NY is named in his honor.

== See also ==
- List of Medal of Honor recipients
- List of Medal of Honor recipients for the Vietnam War
