= Juan Ardila =

American politician

Member of the New York State Assembly from the 37th district
- In office January 1, 2023 – December 31, 2024
- Preceded by: Catherine Nolan
- Succeeded by: Claire Valdez

Personal details
- Born: Elmhurst, Queens, New York, U.S.
- Party: Democratic
- Education: Fordham University (BA); New York University (MPA)
- Website: Official website

Juan Ardila is an American politician who served as a member of the New York State Assembly for the 37th district for one term. Elected in 2022, he lost re-nomination to Claire Valdez in 2024.

== Early life and education ==
Born in Elmhurst, Ardila was raised in Maspeth, Queens. After graduating from Archbishop Molloy High School, he earned a Bachelor of Arts degree in political science from Fordham University and a Master of Public Administration from the Robert F. Wagner Graduate School of Public Service at New York University.

== Career ==
From 2015 to 2017, Ardila served as the office manager and scheduler for City Councilman Brad Lander. He was also a youth tutor for the International Rescue Committee. From 2017 to 2019, he served as an expansion consultant for the New York City Department of Education. In 2019, he joined the Legal Aid Society as a program coordinator.

=== 2021 New York City Council campaign ===
Ardila ran for New York City Council in the 30th district in 2021. He ran on a progressive platform and sought to represent the district's growing Latino population, earning him endorsements from Queens elected officials including Mike Gianaris, Jessica Ramos, Donovan Richards, Jimmy Van Bramer, and the Working Families Party. In April 2021, the New York Post published an article chronicling numerous homophobic and racist derogatory comments and slurs made by Ardila on Facebook while in high school from 2009 to 2011. Ardila apologized the next day and said he regretted making the comments.

He was defeated by incumbent Robert Holden, a conservative Democrat who originally won on the Republican ballot line, in the primary with 45% of the vote.

=== New York State Assembly ===
Ardila was elected to the New York State Assembly in 2022.

In March 2023, Ardila was accused of having sexually assaulted two women in 2015. Governor Kathy Hochul and others responded by calling on Ardila to resign from the Assembly. Ardila initially apologized for his conduct, but later released a 34-page report stating that his behavior on the evening in question had been entirely consensual.

In his bid for re-election in 2024, Ardila placed third in the Democratic primary with 9.7% of the vote behind eventual winner Claire Valdez and Johanna Carmona.

== Electoral history ==
=== 2024 ===
2024 New York State Assembly election, District 37
Primary election
Party	Candidate	Votes	%
Democratic	Claire Valdez	4,075	58.6
Democratic	Johanna Carmona	2,179	31.3
Democratic	Juan Ardila (incumbent)	675	9.7
Write-in		21	0.3
Total votes		6,951	

=== 2022 ===
2022 New York State Assembly election, District 37
Primary election
Party	Candidate	Votes	%
Democratic	Juan Ardila	3,549	43.8
Democratic	Brent O'Leary	2,105	26.0
Democratic	Johanna Carmona	1,614	19.9
Democratic	Jim Magee	821	10.1
Write-in		18	0.2
Total votes		8,107	100.0
General election
Democratic	Juan Ardila	16,663	
Working Families	Juan Ardila	5,551	
Total	Juan Ardila	22,214	98.5
Write-in		333	1.5
Total votes		22,547	100.0
Democratic hold			

=== 2021 ===
2021 New York City Council election, 30th District, Democratic Primary election
Party	Candidate	Votes	%
Democratic	Robert Holden (incumbent)	5,250	54.6
Democratic	Juan Ardila	4,324	45.0
Write-in		38	0.4
Total votes		9,612	100.0
