= Thomas P. Cullen =

American lawyer and politician (1908–1968)

Member of the New York State Assembly from the 34th district
- In office January 1, 1967 – December 31, 1968
- Preceded by: Thomas V. LaFauci
- Succeeded by: Rosemary R. Gunning

Member of the New York State Assembly from the 36th district
- In office January 1, 1966 – December 31, 1966
- Preceded by: District created
- Succeeded by: Rudolph F. DiBlasi

Member of the New York State Assembly from the Queens County 2nd district
- In office January 1, 1965 – December 31, 1965
- Preceded by: William C. Brennan
- Succeeded by: District abolished

Personal details
- Born: January 1, 1908 Brooklyn, New York City, U.S.
- Died: January 24, 1968 (aged 60)
- Cause of death: Heart attack
- Party: Democratic
- Other political affiliations: Liberal
- Spouse: Mathilda Dunn
- Children: 1
- Education: Georgetown University; New York Law School (LLB)
- Profession: Lawyer, politician

Thomas P. Cullen (January 1, 1908 – January 24, 1968) was an American lawyer and politician from New York. A Democrat, he served in the New York State Assembly from 1965 until his death in 1968.

== Life ==
Cullen was born on January 1, 1908, in Brooklyn, New York City. He attended St. Mary's School, Brooklyn Preparatory School, and Georgetown University. He graduated from New York Law School in 1941, was admitted to the bar, and practiced law in New York City.

Cullen married Mathilda Dunn, and they had one son, Thomas Patrick Cullen. They lived in Sunnyside, Queens.

Cullen was appointed as an Assistant Queens County District Attorney in 1946, and entered politics as a Democrat. He was a member of the New York State Assembly from 1965 until his death in 1968, sitting in the 175th, 176th and 177th New York State Legislatures.

He died on January 24, 1968, of a heart attack.

New York State Assembly
Preceded by William C. Brennan	New York State Assembly; Queens County, 2nd District; 1965	Succeeded by District abolished
Preceded by District created	New York State Assembly; 36th District; 1966	Succeeded by Rudolph F. DiBlasi
Preceded by Thomas V. LaFauci	New York State Assembly; 34th District; 1967–1968	Succeeded by Rosemary R. Gunning
