= Grover Cleveland High School (Queens) =

Public school in New York City

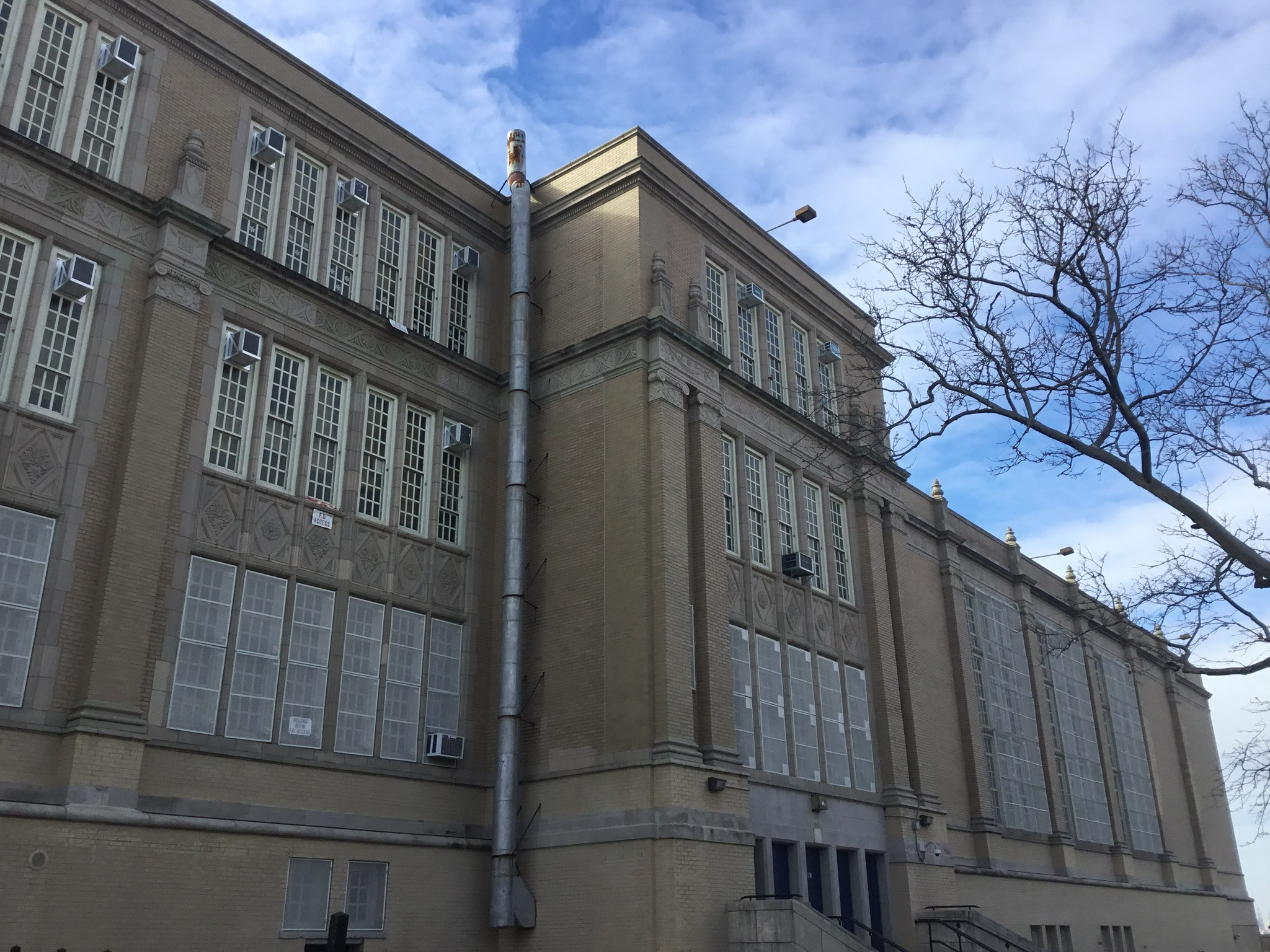

Location
- 21-27 Himrod St; Ridgewood, Queens, New York 11385; United States
- Coordinates: 40°42′41″N 73°54′32″W

Information
- Type: Public
- Motto: Unity in Diversity
- Established: 1931
- School district: New York City Department of Education
- NCES School ID: 360009801959
- Principal: Marc Pascente
- Teaching staff: 109.28 (on an FTE basis)
- Grades: 9-12
- Enrollment: 1,536 (2023-2024)
- Student to teacher ratio: 14.06
- Campus: City: Large
- Colors: Black and Gold
- Mascot: Tigers
- Newspaper: The Grover Cleveland Herald
- Yearbook: Cleveland Log
- Website: www.groverclevelandhs.org

Grover Cleveland High School is a large, comprehensive high school in Ridgewood, Queens. Grover Cleveland High School, Bayside High School, Samuel J. Tilden High School, Abraham Lincoln High School, John Adams High School, Walton High School, and Andrew Jackson High School were all built during the Great Depression from one set of blueprints in order to save money. The school is named after former U.S. president Grover Cleveland.

== Extracurricular activities ==
=== Sports ===
Sports teams include:

Boys

- Baseball (Varsity and Junior Varsity)
- Basketball (Varsity and Junior Varsity)
- Bowling (Varsity)
- Cross Country
- Handball
- Indoor Track (Varsity)
- Outdoor Track (Varsity)
- Soccer (Varsity)
- Swimming (Varsity)
- Tennis (Varsity)
- Volleyball (Varsity)
- Wrestling

Girls

- Basketball (Varsity and J.V.)
- Bowling (Varsity)
- Indoor Track
- Outdoor Track
- Swimming (Varsity)
- Tennis (Varsity)
- Volleyball (Varsity and J.V.)

=== Academic teams ===
Physics Robotics Science Olympiad Science Research Debate (won the 2009 NYC Lincoln-Douglas Debate Championships in the Rising Star Tier)

=== Yearbook ===
The yearbook was called the Cleveland Log.

== Notable alumni ==
- Cheryl James – singer from Grammy Award-winning Salt-N-Pepa
- Jim Gordon – sportscaster
- Marisol Maldonado – model
- Thomas P. Noonan, Jr. – Medal of Honor USMC veteran
- Rosie Perez – award-winning actress, activist
- Emanuel Xavier – award-winning poet, LGBTQ activist
- Bob Sheppard – Yankee Stadium announcer
- Joe Massino – former boss of the Bonanno Crime Family
- Julius LaRosa – singer and entertainer
- Catherine Nolan – Assemblywoman of District 37 Ridgewood, Queens
- Salvatore Vitale – former underboss of the Bonanno crime family
- Gerard Yantz – member of the United States field handball squad which played at the 1936 Summer Olympics
- George Eisenbarth – expert in type 1 diabetes
