= Catherine Nolan =

American politician (1958–2026)

Catherine T. Nolan

Deputy Speaker of the New York State Assembly
- In office January 1, 2019 – December 31, 2022
- Preceded by: Earlene Hooper
- Succeeded by: Phil Ramos

Member of the New York State Assembly from the 37th district
- In office January 3, 1985 – December 31, 2022
- Preceded by: Clifford Wilson
- Succeeded by: Juan Ardila

Personal details
- Born: March 12, 1958 Syracuse, New York, U.S.
- Died: March 11, 2026 (aged 67) New York City, U.S.
- Party: Democratic
- Spouse: Gerard Marsicano (m. 1978)
- Children: 1
- Education: New York University
- Profession: Politician
- Website: Official website

Catherine Theresa Nolan (March 12, 1958 – March 11, 2026) was an American politician from the state of New York. A Democrat, Nolan served as the Deputy Speaker of the New York State Assembly. Nolan represented New York's 37th State Assembly district, which included the Queens neighborhoods of Sunnyside, Ridgewood, Astoria, Woodside, Long Island City, Maspeth, Queensbridge, Ravenswood, Dutch Kills, and Blissville, from 1985 to 2022.

== Life and career ==
Nolan was born in Syracuse, New York, on March 12, 1958. She lived in her Assembly district for most of her life. She graduated from Grover Cleveland High School. She received a B.A. degree (cum laude) in political science from New York University. She was first elected to the Assembly in 1984. Nolan was a member of the Democratic leadership in the Assembly and served as chair of both the Labor and Banking Committee during her career. In January 2006, Nolan was appointed chair of the Assembly Standing Committee on Education. She was also a member of the Rules Committee and the Ways & Means Committee.

She ran uncontested in the 2008 general election and won the 2010 general election with 84 percent of the vote. She did not run for re-election in 2022.

Nolan resided in Ridgewood, Queens. She was married to Gerard Marsicano, in 1978 and had a son. She died in Queens from mesothelioma on March 11, 2026, the day before her 68th birthday.

New York State Assembly
Preceded by Clifford E. Wilson	New York State Assembly; 37th District; 1985–2022	Succeeded by Juan Ardila
