= Rudolph F. DiBlasi =

American politician

Member of the New York City Council from the 19th district
- In office January 1, 1970 – December 31, 1973
- Preceded by: Dominick Corso
- Succeeded by: Edward L. Sadowsky

Member of the New York State Assembly from the 36th district
- In office January 1, 1967 – September 4, 1969
- Preceded by: Thomas P. Cullen
- Succeeded by: Peter G. Mirto

Personal details
- Born: February 24, 1919 Brooklyn, New York City, New York
- Died: November 2, 1977 (aged 58) Manhattan, New York City, New York
- Party: Democratic

Rudolph F. DiBlasi (February 24, 1919 – November 2, 1977) was an American politician who served in the New York State Assembly from the 36th district from 1967 to 1969 and in the New York City Council from the 19th district from 1970 to 1973.

He died on November 2, 1977, in Manhattan, New York City, New York at age 58.
