= William C. Brennan =

American politician (1918–2000)

William C. Brennan (October 11, 1918 – May 8, 2000) was an American lawyer and politician from New York.

== Life ==
He was born on October 11, 1918, in New York City. He attended Junior High School No. 125. He graduated from Newtown High School. Then he became a traffic patrolman. In 1941, he married Gloria M. Lauer, and they had two children. During World War II he served in the U.S. Army Air Force. He graduated from New York University School of Law in 1948, and practiced law in New York City. He also entered politics as a Democrat.

Brennan was a member of the New York State Assembly (Queens Co., 2nd D.) from 1955 to 1964, sitting in the 170th, 171st, 172nd, 173rd and 174th New York State Legislatures. On July 2, 1964, he was appointed by Mayor Robert F. Wagner, Jr. to the New York City Criminal Court. Brennan left the bench when the new Mayor John V. Lindsay did not re-appoint him in January 1966.

Brennan was a member of the New York State Senate (12th D.) in 1967 and 1968. In November 1968, he was elected to the New York City Civil Court and returned to the bench in January 1969. In November 1969, he was elected to the New York Supreme Court and served from 1970 to 1985.

On July 25, 1985, he was indicted by a federal grand jury for taking $47,000 in bribes to fix cases in his court. On July 31, he was arraigned before Justice Jack B. Weinstein in the United States District Court for the Eastern District of New York, and pleaded not guilty. On December 12, Brennan was convicted of taking bribes and several related charges. He then resigned from the bench. On February 3, 1986, he was sentenced to five years in prison, and fined $209,000. On February 11, he was denied bail while appealing, and was ordered to go to jail on March 10. Brennan served 26 months of his sentence, and was released on parole from Allenwood Federal Prison on May 13, 1988. On the same day, his appeal was judged: nine of the original 26 charges were dismissed, and his fine was reduced to $9,000, but the prison sentence was upheld.

He died on May 8, 2000.

== Sources ==
New York State Assembly
| Preceded by Edward J. Riley | New York State Assembly; Queens County, 2nd District; 1955–1964 | Succeeded by Thomas P. Cullen |
New York State Senate
| Preceded by Nicholas Ferraro | New York State Senate; 12th District; 1967–1968 | Succeeded by Martin J. Knorr |
