= Clifford E. Wilson =

American politician (1946–2018)

Member of the New York State Assembly from the 37th district
- In office January 1, 1977 – December 31, 1984
- Preceded by: Rosemary R. Gunning
- Succeeded by: Catherine Nolan

Personal details
- Born: December 18, 1946 Queens, New York City, New York
- Died: December 14, 2018 (aged 71)
- Party: Democratic

Clifford E. Wilson (December 18, 1946 – December 14, 2018) was an American politician who served in the New York State Assembly from the 37th district from 1977 to 1984.

New York State Assembly
Preceded by Rosemary R. Gunning	New York State Assembly; 37th District; 1977–1984	Succeeded by Catherine Nolan
