= Clifford Grainge =

English cricketer and educator

Personal information
- Full name: Clifford Marshall Grainge
- Born: 21 July 1927; Heckmondwike, Yorkshire, England
- Died: 26 May 1989 (aged 61); Leeds, Yorkshire, England
- Batting: Right-handed
- Bowling: Right-arm fast-medium

Domestic team information
- Years: Team
- 1950–1952: Oxford University

Career statistics
Competition	First-class
Matches	14
Runs scored	47
Batting average	5.22
100s/50s	–/–
Top score	14*
Balls bowled	2,023
Wickets	25
Bowling average	43.60
5 wickets in innings	1
10 wickets in match	–
Best bowling	5/127
Catches/stumpings	4/–
- Source: Cricinfo, 24 March 2020

Clifford Marshall Grainge (21 July 1927 – 26 May 1989) was an English first-class cricketer and educator.

Grainge was born in July 1927 at Heckmondwike, Yorkshire. He later studied at Keble College, Oxford where he played first-class cricket for Oxford University. He made his debut against Lancashire at Oxford in 1950, with Grainge playing first-class cricket for Oxford until 1952, making a total of fourteen appearances. Playing as a right-arm fast-medium bowler, he took 25 wickets at an average of 43.60. He took one five wicket haul, figures of 5 for 127 which came against Surrey in 1951. He was a poor tailend batsman, scoring just 47 runs at an average of 5.22.

After graduating from Oxford, he became a schoolteacher. His first teaching position was in Norfolk at Langley School, before taking up a post teaching geography at Leeds Grammar School. Late in his teaching career in 1984 he suffered a leg amputation, prior to retiring in July 1987. Grainge died at Leeds in May 1989.
