= New York's 37th State Assembly district =

American legislative district

Assemblymember
Claire Valdez; D–Ridgewood

New York's 37th State Assembly district is one of the 150 districts in the New York State Assembly. It has been represented by Claire Valdez since 2025, defeating then-incumbent Juan Ardila.

== Geography ==
District 37 is located in Queens.

=== 2020s ===
It contains the neighborhoods of Sunnyside, Sunnyside Gardens, and portions of Ridgewood, Long Island City and Maspeth.

The district overlaps (partially) with New York's 6th and 7th congressional districts, the 12th, 18th and 59th districts of the New York State Senate, and the 26th, 30th and 34th districts of the New York City Council.

=== 2010s ===
It contains the neighborhoods of Sunnyside, Ridgewood, portions of Astoria, Woodside, Long Island City, Maspeth, Queensbridge, Ravenswood, Dutch Kills and Blissville.

== Recent election results ==
=== 2026 ===
2026 New York State Assembly election, District 37
Primary election
Party	Candidate	Votes	%
Democratic	Samantha Kattan	8,031	66.9
Democratic	Melissa Orlando	2,028	16.9
Democratic	Pia Rahman	1,904	15.9
Write-in		46	0.3
Total votes		12,009	100.0
General election
Democratic	Samantha Kattan		
Working Families	Samantha Kattan		
Total	Samantha Kattan		
Write-in			
Total votes			100.0

=== 2024 ===
2024 New York State Assembly election, District 37
Primary election
Party	Candidate	Votes	%
Democratic	Claire Valdez	4,075	58.6
Democratic	Johanna Carmona	2,179	31.3
Democratic	Juan Ardila (incumbent)	675	9.7
Write-in		21	0.3
Total votes		6,951	
General election
Democratic	Claire Valdez	26,527	
Working Families	Claire Valdez	7,766	
Total	Claire Valdez	34,293	98.5
Write-in		532	1.5
Total votes		34,825	100.0
Democratic hold			

=== 2022 ===
2022 New York State Assembly election, District 37
Primary election
Party	Candidate	Votes	%
Democratic	Juan Ardila	3,549	43.8
Democratic	Brent O'Leary	2,105	26.0
Democratic	Johanna Carmona	1,614	19.9
Democratic	Jim Magee	821	10.1
Write-in		18	0.2
Total votes		8,107	100.0
General election
Democratic	Juan Ardila	16,663	
Working Families	Juan Ardila	5,551	
Total	Juan Ardila	22,214	98.5
Write-in		333	1.5
Total votes		22,547	100.0
Democratic hold			

=== 2020 ===
2020 New York State Assembly election, District 37
Primary election
Party	Candidate	Votes	%
Democratic	Catherine Nolan (incumbent)	6,554	47.7
Democratic	Mary Jobaida	5,043	36.7
Democratic	Danielle Brecker	2,106	15.3
Write-in		32	0.3
Total votes		13,735	100.0
General election
Democratic	Catherine Nolan (incumbent)	40,614	98.9
Write-in		448	1.1
Total votes		41,062	100.0
Democratic hold			

=== 2018 ===
2018 New York State Assembly election, District 37
Party	Candidate	Votes	%
Democratic	Catherine Nolan	26,494	
Working Families	Catherine Nolan	2,541	
Total	Catherine Nolan (incumbent)	29,035	99.3
Write-in		195	0.7
Total votes		29,230	100.0
Democratic hold			

=== 2016 ===
2016 New York State Assembly election, District 37
Party	Candidate	Votes	%
Democratic	Catherine Nolan	31,423	
Working Families	Catherine Nolan	3,412	
Total	Catherine Nolan (incumbent)	34,835	99.5
Write-in		162	0.5
Total votes		34,997	100.0
Democratic hold			

=== 2014 ===
2014 New York State Assembly election, District 37
Party	Candidate	Votes	%
Democratic	Catherine Nolan	8,817	
Working Families	Catherine Nolan	1,519	
Total	Catherine Nolan (incumbent)	10,336	92.6
Libertarian	John Wilson	792	7.1
Write-in		29	0.3
Total votes		11,157	100.0
Democratic hold			

=== 2012 ===
2012 New York State Assembly election, District 37
Party	Candidate	Votes	%
Democratic	Catherine Nolan	23,029	
Working Families	Catherine Nolan	1,314	
Total	Catherine Nolan (incumbent)	24,343	87.7
Republican	John Wilson	3,384	12.2
Write-in		21	0.1
Total votes		27,748	100.0
Democratic hold			

=== 2010 ===
2010 New York State Assembly election, District 37
Party	Candidate	Votes	%
Democratic	Catherine Nolan	10,988	
Working Families	Catherine Nolan	1,182	
Total	Catherine Nolan (incumbent)	12,170	83.9
Republican	John Wilson	2,300	15.9
Write-in		26	0.2
Total votes		14,496	100.0
Democratic hold			

=== 2008 ===
2008 New York State Assembly election, District 37
Party	Candidate	Votes	%
Democratic	Catherine Nolan (incumbent)	20,601	100.0
Write-in		5	0.0
Total votes		20,606	100.0
Democratic hold			

=== 2006 ===
2006 New York State Assembly election, District 37
Party	Candidate	Votes	%
Democratic	Catherine Nolan (incumbent)	10,102	100.0
Write-in		5	0.0
Total votes		10,107	100.0
Democratic hold			

=== 2004 ===
2004 New York State Assembly election, District 37
Party	Candidate	Votes	%
Democratic	Catherine Nolan	17,525	
Working Families	Catherine Nolan	1,012	
Total	Catherine Nolan (incumbent)	18,537	100.0
Write-in		3	0.0
Total votes		18,540	100.0
Democratic hold			

=== 2002 ===
2002 New York State Assembly election, District 37
Party	Candidate	Votes	%
Democratic	Catherine Nolan	8,157	
Working Families	Catherine Nolan	481	
Total	Catherine Nolan (incumbent)	8,638	94.4
Green	Patrick Langhenry	510	5.6
Write-in		3	0.0
Total votes		9,151	100.0
Democratic hold			

=== 2000 ===
2000 New York State Assembly election, District 37
Party	Candidate	Votes	%
Democratic	Catherine Nolan	16,873	
Working Families	Catherine Nolan	608	
Liberal	Catherine Nolan	457	
Total	Catherine Nolan (incumbent)	17,938	83.3
Republican	Alice Lemos	3,099	
Conservative	Alice Lemos	262	
Right to Life	Alice Lemos	223	
Total	Alice Lemos	3,584	16.7
Write-in		1	0.0
Total votes		21,523	100.0
Democratic hold			

=== Federal results in Assembly District 37 ===
Year	Office	Results
2024	President	Harris 65.3 - 31.9%
2024	Senate	Gillibrand 69.6 - 29.1%
2022	Senate	Schumer 73.5 - 25.7%
2020	President	Biden 78.7- 19.8%
2018	Senate	Gillibrand 87.9 - 12.0%
2016	President	Clinton 80.9 - 15.3%
2016	Senate	Schumer 84.4 - 12.0%
2012	President	Obama 83.8 - 14.7%
2012	Senate	Gillibrand 86.8 - 11.4%
