= James Buchanan (South African cricketer) =

South African cricketer (1908–1989)

Personal information
- Born: 22 February 1908; Port Elizabeth, South Africa
- Died: 13 May 1989 (aged 81); Port Elizabeth, South Africa
- Source: Cricinfo, 17 December 2020

James Buchanan (22 February 1908 – 13 May 1989) was a South African cricketer. He played in twenty-one first-class matches from 1936/37 to 1953/54.
