= Emmet Lanigan =

Australian cricketer

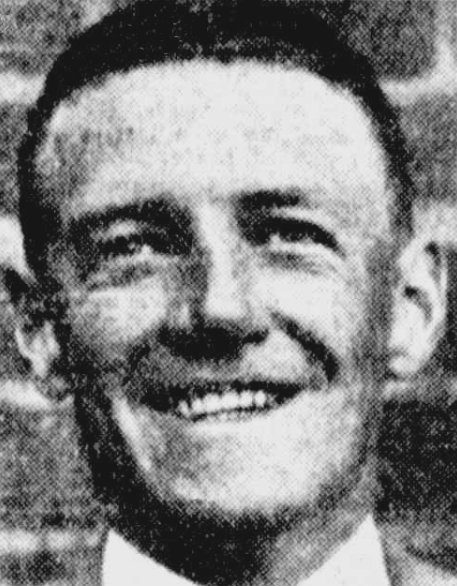

Personal information
- Born: 6 September 1909; Maffra, Australia
- Died: 27 May 1989 (aged 79); Australia

Domestic team information
- Years: Team
- 1931/2: Victoria
- Source: Cricinfo, 22 November 2015

Emmet Lanigan (6 September 1909 – 27 May 1989) was an Australian cricketer. He played one first-class cricket match for Victoria in 1931.

== See also ==
- List of Victoria first-class cricketers
