= Robert Emmett O'Malley =

United States Marine non-commissioned officer and Medal of Honor recipient

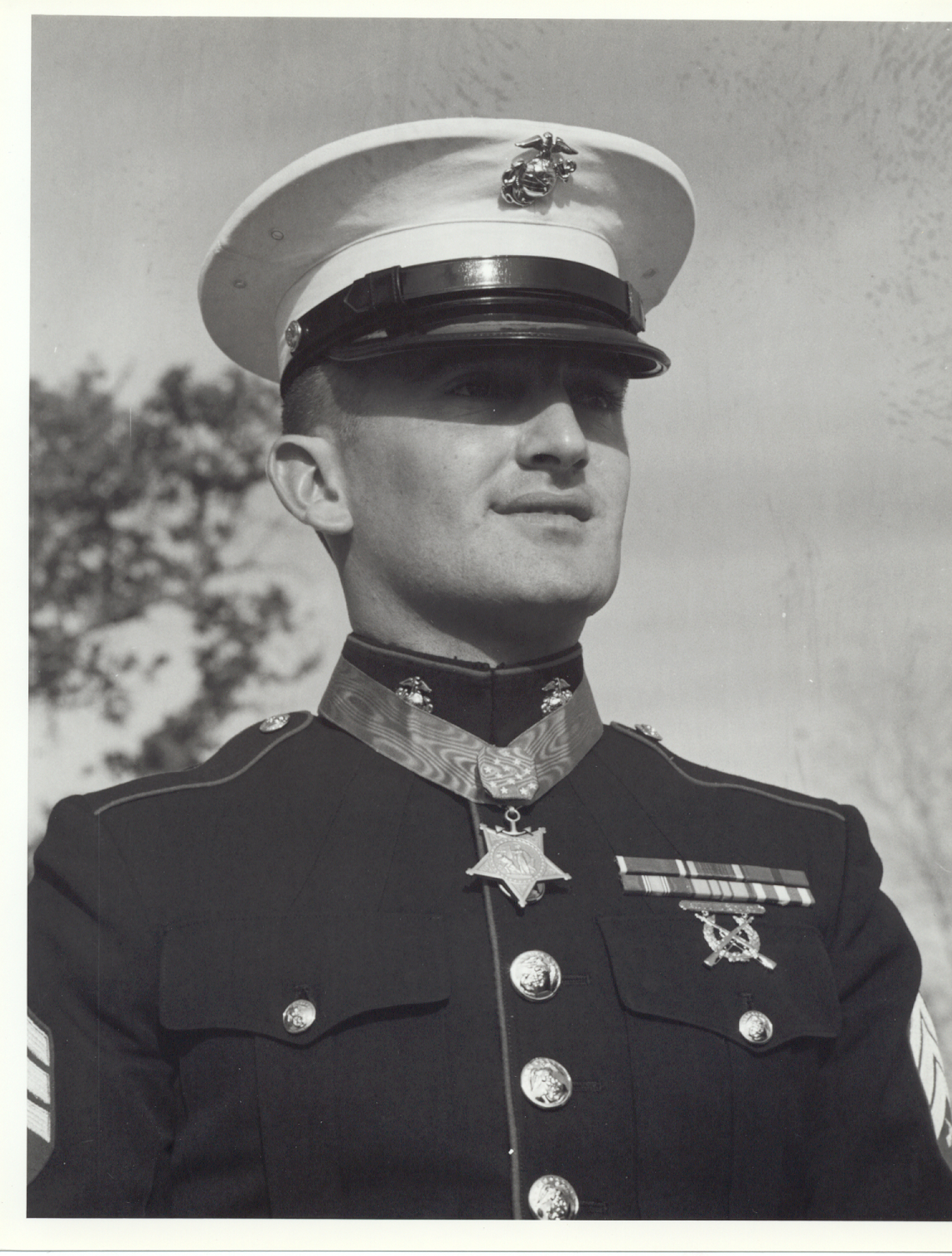
- Sergeant Robert E. O'Malley
- Born: June 3, 1943 (age 83); New York City, New York
- Military career
- Allegiance: United States
- Branch: United States Marine Corps
- Service years: 1961–1966
- Rank: Sergeant
- Units: 3rd Battalion 9th Marines; 2nd Battalion 1st Marines; 3rd Battalion 3rd Marines
- Conflicts: Vietnam War: Operation Starlite
- Awards: Medal of Honor; Purple Heart

Robert Emmett O'Malley (born June 3, 1943) is a United States Marine veteran who was the first Marine Corps recipient of the Medal of Honor in the Vietnam War. He received the medal for his actions as a corporal on August 18, 1965, during Operation Starlite.

== Early life ==
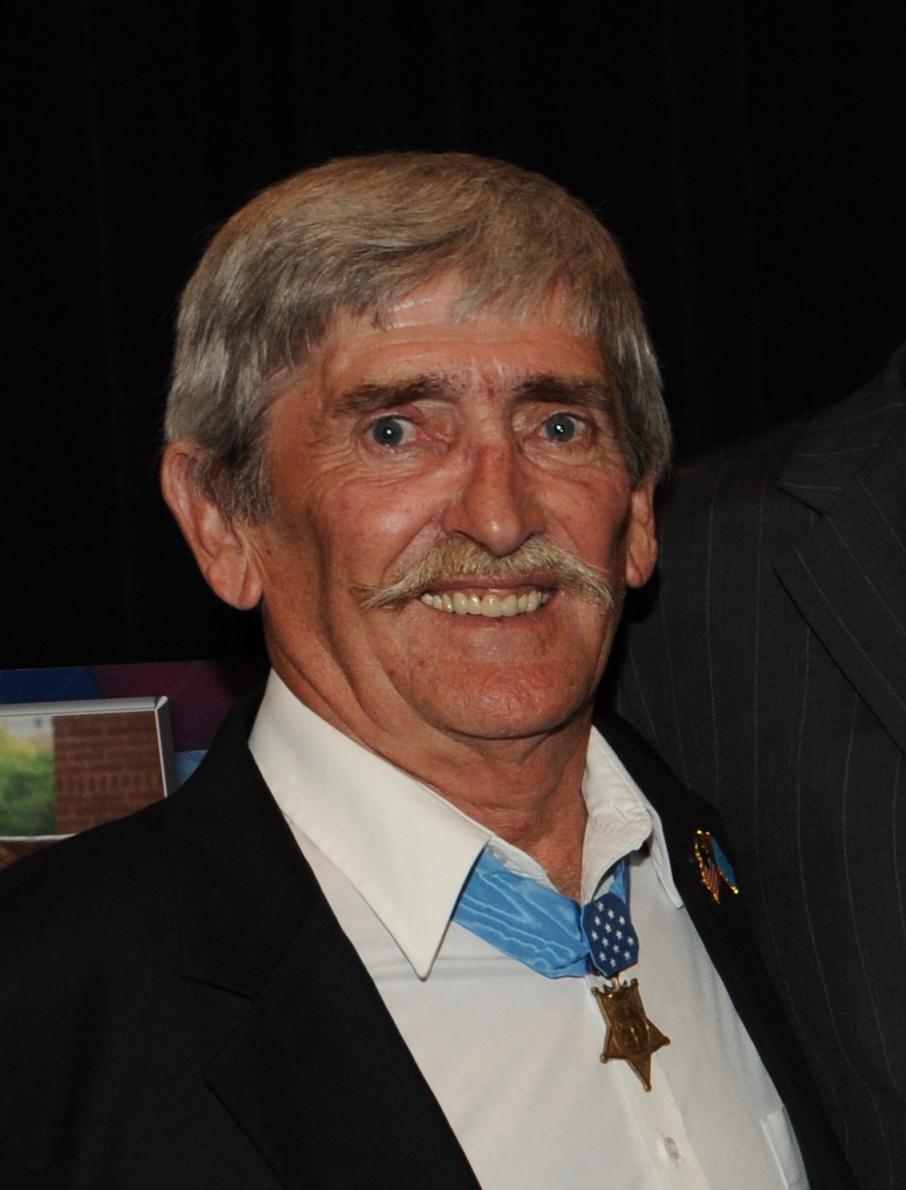
O'Malley in 2010

O'Malley was born on June 3, 1943, in New York City. He was raised and attended school in the Woodside, Queens, section of the city. O'Malley graduated from high school in 1961 and joined the United States Marines soon after; all three of his brothers also served in the Marine Corps. Coincidentally, O'Malley grew up with Lance Corporal Thomas P. Noonan, Jr., who would also be awarded the Medal of Honor in Vietnam, albeit posthumously. The two attended school and church together and were friends throughout childhood. After Noonan's death in Vietnam, O'Malley remained in contact with the Noonan family and visited Noonan's mother every year on Memorial Day.

== Military career ==
Enlisting in the United States Marine Corps on October 11, 1961, O'Malley completed recruit training at the Marine Corps Recruit Depot Parris Island. He then transferred to Marine Corps Base Camp Pendleton and served with the 5th Marine Regiment, 1st Marine Division. He was promoted to private first class in May 1962.

The following year, O'Malley arrived on Okinawa as a member of the 3rd Battalion 9th Marines, then part of 3rd Marine Division. While there, he was promoted to lance corporal in March 1963, and to corporal in November. He returned to Camp Pendleton in 1964 as a member of the 2nd Battalion 1st Marines. In October 1964, he was awarded a Good Conduct Medal upon completing three years of satisfactory service in the Marine Corps.

As a squad leader in Company I, 3rd Battalion 3rd Marines, O'Malley was sent to Vietnam in 1965, arriving at the Chu Lai Marine Corps base in May. Three months later, intelligence indicated a Viet Cong regiment had moved down from the mountains and positioned itself a few miles south of Chu Lai. At dawn on August 18, 1965, as part of Operation Starlite, a preemptive strike against the Viet Cong force, O'Malley's battalion performed an amphibious landing near the village of An Cuong 2. Shortly after landing, they came under mortar and small arms fire. During the ensuing firefight, O'Malley single-handedly attacked a Viet Cong trench and helped to evacuate wounded Marines. Eventually, his squad was ordered to withdraw. As he led his men to the helicopter extraction point, he was hit in the legs, arm, and chest by mortar fragmentation. Despite his wounds, he refused to be evacuated and instead provided suppressive fire until all of his Marines had boarded a helicopter.

After the battle, O'Malley received treatment in Japan for his wounds, including surgery to remove fragmentation that had lodged in his lungs. He was promoted to sergeant in December 1965, and returned to Camp Pendleton, where he stayed for the remainder of his service. He left the Marine Corps in April 1966.

O'Malley was flown on Air Force One to Austin, Texas, and, on December 6, 1966, was awarded the Medal of Honor by President Lyndon B. Johnson at the Federal Building in Austin. Both the United States Marine Corps Silent Drill Platoon and Marine Corps Band took part in the ceremony at the Texas White House.

== Awards and decorations ==
O'Malley's awards include:

Medal of Honor		Purple Heart
Combat Action Ribbon	Navy Unit Commendation	Marine Corps Good Conduct Medal
National Defense Service Medal	Vietnam Service Medal w/ 1 bronze service star	Vietnam Campaign Medal
"RIFLE EXPERT" Badge

- O'Malley received one service stripe.

=== Medal of Honor citation ===
The President of the United States takes pleasure in presenting the MEDAL OF HONOR to

CORPORAL ROBERT E. O'MALLEY
UNITED STATES MARINE CORPS

for service as set forth in the following CITATION:

For conspicuous gallantry and intrepidity in action against the communist (Viet Cong) forces at the risk of his life above and beyond the call of duty while serving as Squad Leader in Company "I", Third Battalion, Third Marines, Third Marine Division (Reinforced) near An Cu'ong 2, South Vietnam, on 18 August 1965. While leading his squad in the assault against a strongly entrenched enemy force, his unit came under intense small arms fire. With complete disregard for his personal safety, Corporal O'Malley raced across an open rice paddy to a trench line where the enemy forces were located. Jumping into the trench, he attacked the Viet Cong with his rifle and grenades, and singly killed eight of the enemy. He then led his squad to the assistance of an adjacent Marine unit which was suffering heavy casualties. Continuing to press forward, he reloaded his weapon and fired with telling effect into the enemy emplacement. He personally assisted in the evacuation of several wounded Marines, and again regrouping the remnants of his squad, he returned to the point of the heaviest fighting. Ordered to an evacuation point by an officer, Corporal O'Malley gathered his besieged and badly wounded squad, and boldly led them under fire to a helicopter for withdrawal. Although three times wounded in this encounter, and facing imminent death from a fanatic and determined enemy, he steadfastly refused evacuation and continued to cover his squad's boarding of the helicopters while, from an exposed position, he delivered fire against the enemy until his wounded men were evacuated. Only then, with his last mission accomplished, did he permit himself to be removed from the battlefield. By his valor, leadership, and courageous efforts in behalf of his comrades, he served as an inspiration to all who observed him, and reflected the highest credit upon the Marine Corps and the United States Naval Service.

/S/ LYNDON B. JOHNSON

== See also ==
- List of Medal of Honor recipients for the Vietnam War
