= Gerard Yantz =

American handball player

Personal information
- Full name: Gerard Anthony Yantz
- Nationality: United States
- Born: 27 June 1917 New York, United States
- Died: 21 May 1989 (aged 71) Lansing, United States

Sport
- Sport: Handball

Senior clubs
- Years: Team
- ?-?: German Sport Club Brooklyn
National team
Years	Team	Apps
?-?	United States	3
- Updated on only during the 1936 Summer Olympics

Gerard Anthony Yantz (27 June 1917 - 21 May 1989) was an American male handball player. He was a member of the United States men's national handball team. He was part of the team at the 1936 Summer Olympics, playing 3 matches. On club level he played for German Sport Club Brooklyn in the United States.

Additionally he was a track athlete for the Grover Cleveland High School (Queens).
