= Joe Hinson =

Australian rules footballer, born 1919

Personal information
- Full name: Joseph Ford Hinson
- Born: 31 August 1919; Richmond, Victoria
- Died: 15 May 1989 (aged 69)
- Original team: Burnley
- Height: 174 cm (5 ft 9 in)
- Weight: 76 kg (168 lb)

Playing career^{1}
Years	Club	Games (Goals)
1942, 1944	Richmond	8 (0)
- ^{1} Playing statistics correct to the end of 1944.

Joseph Ford Hinson (31 August 1919 – 15 May 1989) was an Australian rules footballer who played with Richmond in the Victorian Football League (VFL).

== Military service ==
He enlisted in the Second AIF on 3 July 1942; and, while serving overseas, he lost the sight in one eye.
