= Claire Valdez =

American politician (born 1989)

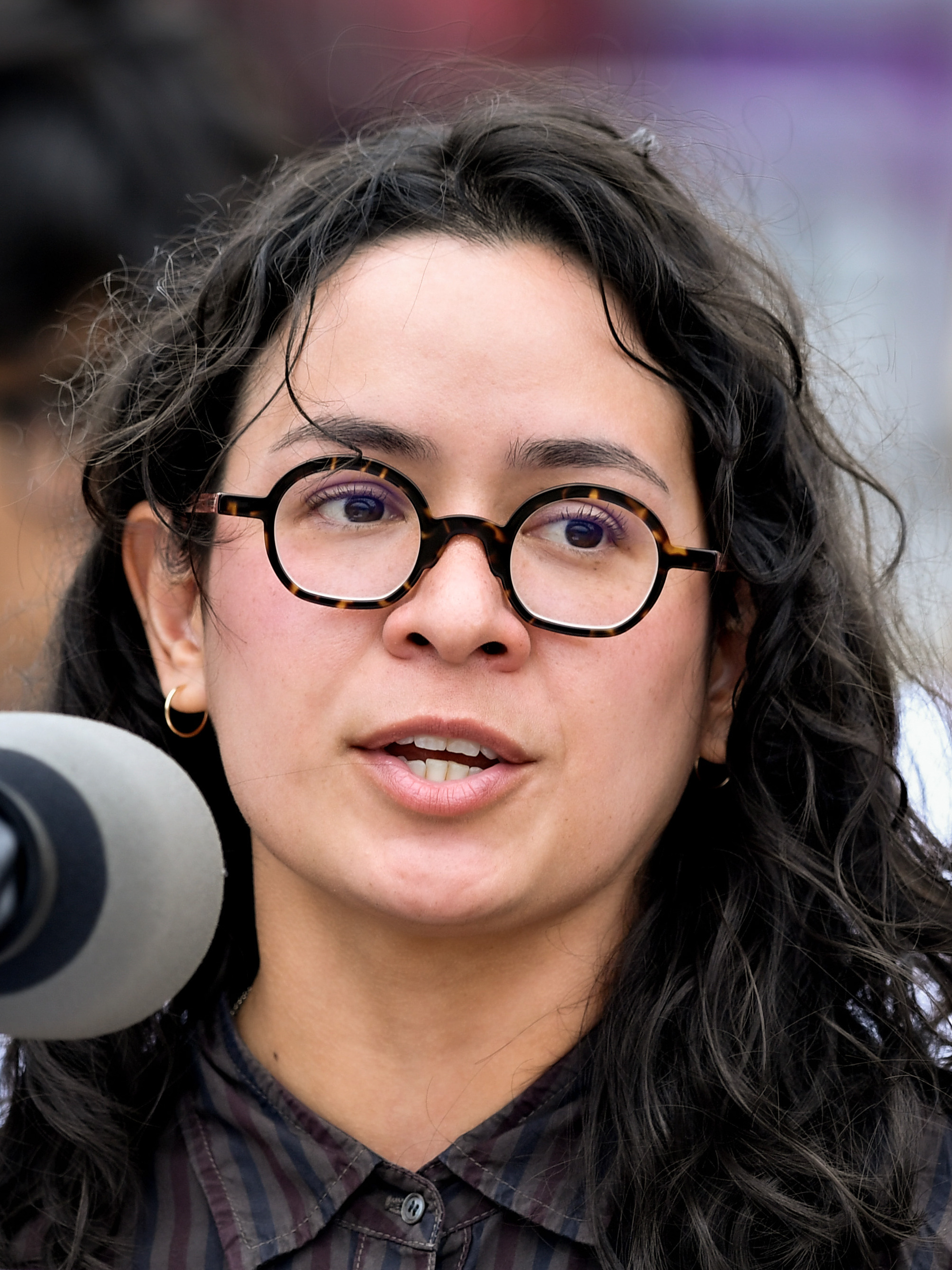
- Valdez in 2025

Member-elect of the U.S. House of Representatives from New York's 7th district
- Assuming office January 3, 2027
- Succeeding: Nydia Velázquez

Member of the New York State Assembly from the 37th district
- Incumbent
- Assumed office January 1, 2025
- Preceded by: Juan Ardila

Personal details
- Born: October 12, 1989 (age 37) Lubbock, Texas, U.S.
- Citizenship: American; Ysleta del Sur Pueblo
- Party: Democratic
- Other political affiliations: Democratic Socialists of America (Note: The Democratic Socialists of America (DSA) are not a registered political party. Instead, they are a political organization for those with democratic socialist ideologies. Valdez is a member of, and is endorsed by, the New York City DSA chapter.)
- Education: School of the Art Institute of Chicago (BFA)

Claire Marie Valdez (born October 12, 1989) is an American politician who is the U.S. representative-elect for New York's 7th congressional district. A member of the Democratic Party and the Democratic Socialists of America, Valdez has served as a member of the New York State Assembly for the 37th district since 2025, representing part of Queens.

== Early life and education ==
Originally from Lubbock, Texas, Valdez moved to New York City in 2015 and lives in Ridgewood, Queens. She is a member of the Democratic Socialists of America and Socialist Majority Caucus. She is "a dual citizen of Ysleta del Sur Pueblo Nation and the United States."

Valdez received her Bachelor of Fine Arts from the School of the Art Institute of Chicago, studying painting and art history. She worked a series of service jobs, including at Taco Bell, Pizza Hut, and Trader Joe's, before moving to New York City to pursue a career in art.

== Early career ==
After graduating from college, Valdez worked as a program assistant in the visual arts department at Columbia University before beginning her term as an assembly member. While working at Columbia, she became an active member of United Auto Workers Local 2110 and was elected unit chair in the local.

In 2019, Valdez joined the New York City chapter of the Democratic Socialists of America and went on to serve as the New Member Coordinator. She has worked on many of the chapter's electoral projects, including Julia Salazar's 2020 reelection and Samy Olivares's 2022 campaign for New York State Assembly.

== New York State Assembly ==
In the 2024 New York State Assembly election, Valdez was a candidate in the 37th district. The incumbent, Juan Ardila, was seen as vulnerable to a primary challenge after two women accused him of sexual assault and misconduct. In the Democratic Party primary, Valdez defeated Ardila by 48 percentage points and moderate Johanna Carmona by 27 percentage points. She was endorsed by Congresswoman Alexandria Ocasio-Cortez, Democratic Socialists of America, and the Working Families Party. She ran unopposed in the November general election.

After launching her assembly campaign in 2023, Valdez called for a ceasefire in Gaza. Upon her election, she joined New York State Socialists in Office. She was arrested during a 2025 demonstration outside the offices of U.S. senators Chuck Schumer and Kirsten Gillibrand, protesting their votes against a resolution halting U.S. sales of arms to Israel. She has sponsored the Not On Our Dime Act, first introduced by Zohran Mamdani during his term in the assembly. The pro-Israel Solidarity PAC spent over $40,000 to oppose her 2024 candidacy for New York State Assembly.

While in the Assembly, Valdez sponsored legislation that sought to bar the use of state and local resources in federal immigration enforcement actions. On September 28, 2025, she was arrested while inspecting the facilities at 26 Federal Plaza in Manhattan.

Amid the investigations into Mayor of New York City Eric Adams, Valdez publicly called for his resignation. She endorsed Zohran Mamdani in the 2025 New York City mayoral election. She was among the early supporters of his campaign and the only elected official present at his October 2024 campaign launch.

== U.S. House of Representatives ==
=== Elections ===
==== 2026 ====
2026 Democratic primary results by precinct Valdez: 30–40%; 40–50%; 50–60%; 60–70%; 70–80%; 80–90%; 90–100%; Reynoso: 30–40%; 40–50%; 50–60%; 60–70%; 70–80%; 80–90%; 90–100%; Won: 30–40%; 40–50%; Tie: 30–40%; 40–50%

On January 8, 2026, Valdez announced her candidacy for New York's 7th congressional district to succeed retiring incumbent Nydia Velázquez. In the primary, she faced Brooklyn borough president Antonio Reynoso and New York City Councilor Julie Won. The race was seen as a fight between progressives, who largely backed Reynoso, and socialists, who backed Valdez. Valdez was endorsed by New York City mayor Zohran Mamdani, Senator Bernie Sanders, NYC-DSA, Justice Democrats, and the United Auto Workers. Reynoso received the support of Velázquez and the Working Families Party and received the majority of labor union endorsements.

Valdez, along with fellow Mamdani-endorsed congressional candidates Brad Lander and Darializa Avila Chevalier, received outside support from the super PAC American Priorities, which was created to counter the influence of AIPAC. AIPAC did not directly involve itself in the campaign.

On May 14, Valdez's campaign ratified a union contract under the Campaign Workers Guild, becoming the first campaign in New York to unionize during the 2026 election cycle.

On June 23, Valdez defeated Reynoso and Won. She was expected to win the general election, as New York's 7th district was considered a safe seat with a Cook Partisan Voting Index of D+25, and did so on November 3, making her the first Native American woman to represent New York in Congress.

== Political positions ==
=== Environment ===
As a State Assembly member, Valdez was the primary sponsor of legislation to create a state office to coordinate environmental sustainability policies at the State University of New York.

In January 2026, Valdez and then-Assembly candidate Diana Moreno wrote an op-ed calling for a $200 million commitment to public renewable energy in the 2026 state budget.

=== Foreign policy ===
==== Iran ====
Valdez strongly opposes the 2026 Iran war. In March 2026 she said that US intervention would cause "mass chaos and destruction" and criticized congressional Democratic leaders for their rhetorical choices about the war, saying: "The emphasis on procedure and expecting the Trump administration to provide some evidence or rationale that supports this war is an abdication of our responsibility to say that we don't want another endless war". She also said, "The Iranian regime, the crushing of dissent in their own country, is of course awful, but military intervention from the U.S. is not going to solve that problem."

==== Israel and Palestine ====
During her State Assembly campaign, Valdez advocated for a ceasefire in Gaza and was a vocal supporter of justice in Palestine. As an Assembly member, she sponsored the Not On Our Dime Act, which would prohibit New York nonprofits from supporting Israeli settlement activity. During her Congressional campaign, Valdez was a strong critic of Israel, calling its actions in Gaza a genocide and apartheid and supporting the arrest of Israeli Prime Minister Benjamin Netanyahu if he came to New York.

=== Housing ===
Valdez has advocated policies including universal rent control, construction of social housing, and stronger tenant protections. To enact rent control, she has supported helping states build county-level rent boards to set rents.

In the State Assembly, Valdez co-sponsored a bill to build and finance the construction of new social housing. She supports the Homes Act, which would establish a federally backed development authority to build affordable public housing capped at 25% of a household's adjusted gross income.

=== Labor ===
Valdez has advocated for significant labor law reform, including ending at-will employment, a federal job guarantee, and a four-day workweek. She has also expressed strong supports for unions, saying, "We're going to prioritize rebuilding the labor movement and getting every single worker into a union. And that's going to be priority number one for me when I'm in office."

Valdez supports the Protecting the Right to Organize Act, which would expand employees' rights to organize and collectively bargain.

=== Healthcare ===
Valdez supports Medicare for All and transitioning to a single-payer healthcare system.

=== Social issues ===
==== Immigration ====
Valdez has called for abolishing the U.S. Immigration and Customs Enforcement (ICE) agency, naming it as one of her day-one legislative priorities in Congress.

Valdez attends a 2026 protest against NYU Langone's decision to bar minors from gender-affirming care.

==== LGBTQ rights ====
Valdez is a proponent of LGBTQ rights. She supports transgender rights, including funding for gender-affirming care and the adoption of a Transgender Bill of Rights to provide anti-discrimination protection based on gender identity.

== Electoral history ==
=== 2024 ===
2024 New York State Assembly election, District 37
Primary election
Party	Candidate	Votes	%
Democratic	Claire Valdez	4,075	58.6
Democratic	Johanna Carmona	2,179	31.3
Democratic	Juan Ardila (incumbent)	675	9.7
Write-in		21	0.3
Total votes		6,951	
General election
Democratic	Claire Valdez	26,527	77.4
Working Families	Claire Valdez	7,766	22.6
Total	Claire Valdez	34,293	98.5
Write-in		533	1.5
Total votes		34,826	100.0
Democratic hold			

=== 2026 ===
2026 New York's 7th congressional district election
Party	Candidate	Votes	%
Democratic	Claire Valdez	37,531	56.1
Democratic	Antonio Reynoso	23,960	35.8
Democratic	Julie Won	4,231	6.3
Democratic	Vichal Kumar	1,134	1.7
Democratic	Write-in	97	0.1
Total votes		66,953	100.0

== See also ==
- List of LGBT members of the United States Congress
- List of Native Americans in the United States Congress
- Native American women in politics
- Women in the United States House of Representatives

== Notes ==
U.S. House of Representatives
Preceded by Nydia Velázquez	Member of the U.S. House of Representatives from New York's 1st congressional district Taking office 2027	Elect
