= Raisa Orlova =

Russian writer and American studies scholar

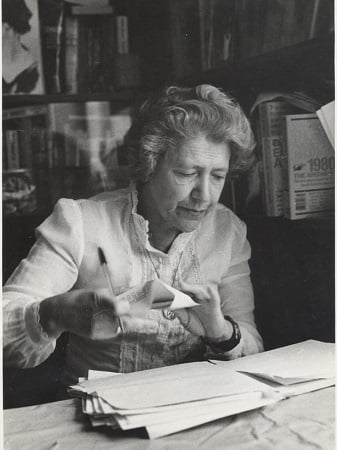
Raisa Orlova in Moscow, 1980.

Raisa Davydovna Orlova-Kopeleva (Russian: Раи́са Давы́довна Орло́ва-Ко́пелева, 23 July 1918, Moscow – 31 May 1989, Cologne) was a Russian writer and American studies scholar.

She was the second wife of Lev Kopelev.

== Selected works ==
Books

- Die Türen öffnen sich langsam (1984), Двери открываются медленно (1994)
- Memoirs (USA 1983), Eine Vergangenheit, die nicht vergeht. Rückblicke aus fünf Jahrzehnten (1985), Воспоминания о непрошедшем времени (Moscow 1993)
- Briefe aus Köln über Bücher aus Moskau (1987)
- Als die Glocke verstummte; Alexander Herzens letztes Lebensjahr (1988)
- Warum ich lebe (1990. posthumous)

With Lev Kopelev

- Boris Pasternak. „Bild der Welt im Wort“ (1986)
- Wir lebten in Moskau (1987), Мы жили в Москве (1) (USA 1988, Moscow 1990)
- Zeitgenossen, Meister, Freunde (1989), Мы жили в Москве (2)
- Wir lebten in Köln. Aufzeichnungen und Erinnerungen (1996), Мы жили в Кёльне (2003)

Articles

- Orlowa, Raissa; Kopelew, Lew (28 May 1982). "Die Erinnerungen Pjotr Grigorenkos : Der Hauptheld ist die Wahrheit" [Memoirs by Pyotr Grigorenko: The Main Hero is the Truth]. Die Zeit (in German).
