= Karen Ulane =

American aviator

- Born: December 10, 1941; Chicago, Illinois, U.S.
- Died: May 22, 1989 (aged 47) near DeKalb, Illinois, U.S.
- Occupation: Aviation
- Known for: Legal precedent for transsexual people under Civil Rights Act of 1964

Karen Frances Ulane (December 10, 1941 – May 22, 1989) was an American airline pilot who was dismissed by Eastern Airlines after undergoing sex reassignment surgery in 1980. The case Ulane v. Eastern Airlines became the federal legal precedent for transsexual legal status under the Civil Rights Act of 1964.

== Life and career ==
Ulane was born in Chicago, Illinois and graduated from St. Ignatius College Prep. Ulane joined the United States Army and flew combat missions in the Vietnam War from 1964 to 1968, then became a pilot for Eastern Airlines. Following employment with Eastern Airlines, Ulane transitioned and changed her legal name in April 1980.

T.R. Buttion, the Senior Vice President of Flight Operations presented her with a letter of termination on April 24, 1981, that read, "It is our belief that the controversial nature of the operation you have undergone will detract from and prevent any flight crew of which you are a part of from operating in the integrated, coordinated fashion that is necessary to attain the highest degree of safety." The letter also noted that other Eastern pilots would refuse to fly with her.

Ulane filed a discrimination charge with the Equal Employment Opportunity Commission which resulted in the civil case, Ulane v. Eastern Airlines. In her case against Eastern Airlines, Ulane reported coping with gender dysphoria from the age of 5 or 6. U.S. District Judge John F. Grady ruled in her favor, ordering her reinstatement and $158,590 in back pay. Eastern appealed the ruling and it was overturned in the U.S. Court of Appeals for the Seventh Circuit, and in 1985, the U.S. Supreme Court let the appellate ruling stand. According to her attorney, Ulane ultimately received a settlement from the airlines that was "substantially more" than the amount ordered by judge Grady.

Ulane died in the crash of a chartered DC-3 she was piloting on a training flight, approximately five miles southwest of DeKalb, Illinois on May 22, 1989. Two others also died in the crash.

=== Legacy ===
The case Ulane v. Eastern Airlines set legal precedent in the United States that transgender identities did not fall under the protection of the Civil Rights Act of 1964, a standing which remained for decades.
