= Fred Dean (Australian footballer) =

Australian rules footballer, born 1909

Personal information
- Full name: Fred Dean
- Born: 14 April 1909
- Died: 16 May 1989 (aged 80)
- Original team: Havelocks / West Melbourne
- Height: 173 cm (5 ft 8 in)
- Weight: 76 kg (168 lb)

Playing career^{1}
Years	Club	Games (Goals)
1930	North Melbourne	5 (2)
- ^{1} Playing statistics correct to the end of 1930.

Fred Dean (14 April 1909 – 16 May 1989) was an Australian rules footballer who played with North Melbourne in the Victorian Football League (VFL).
