= Virgil Geddes =

American dramatist

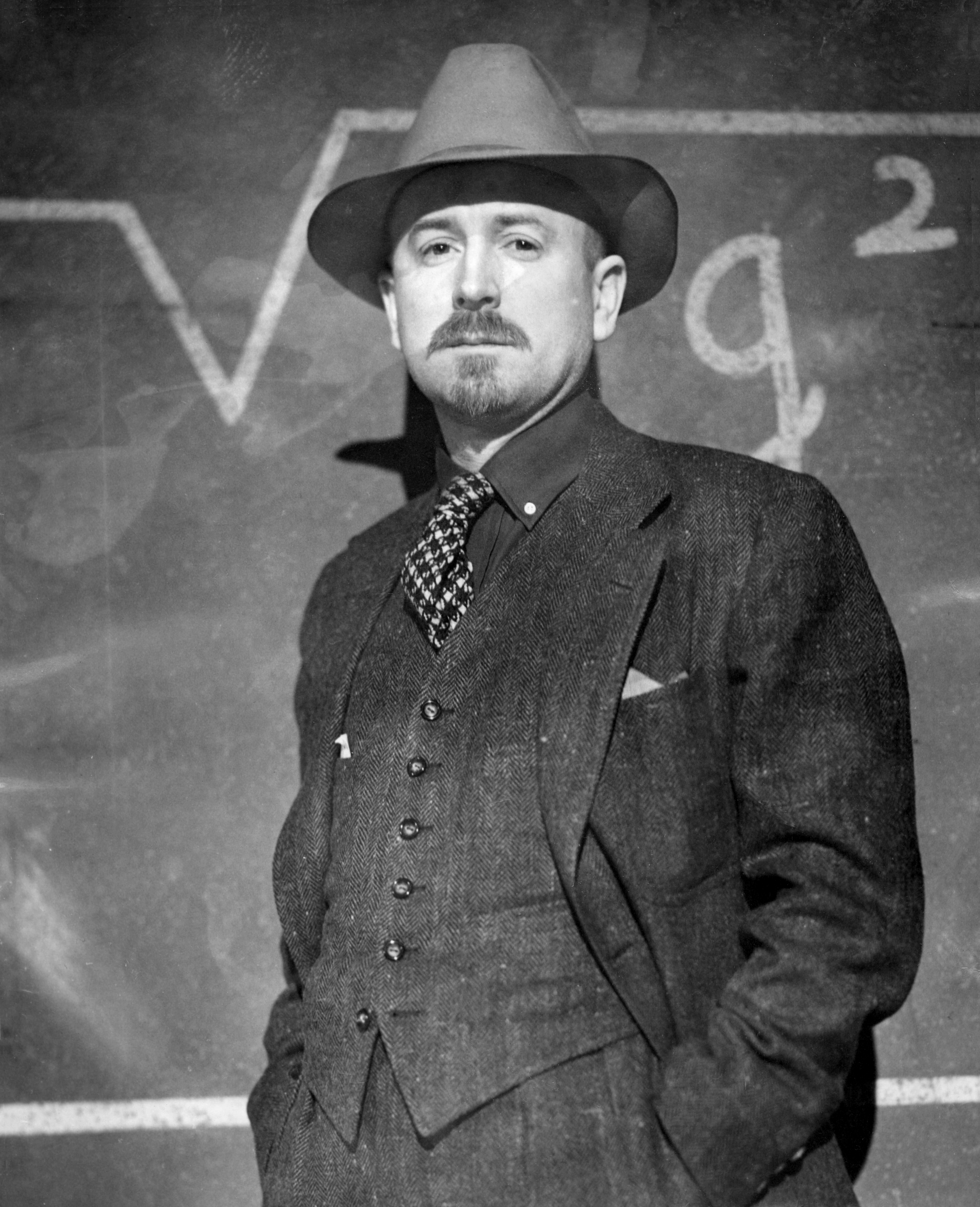
- Geddes in 1936, while directing the Federal Theatre Project production of Chalk Dust
- Born: 1897; Nebraska
- Died: May 24, 1989 (aged 92); Togus, Maine
- Occupations: Writer, newspaper columnist, and playwright

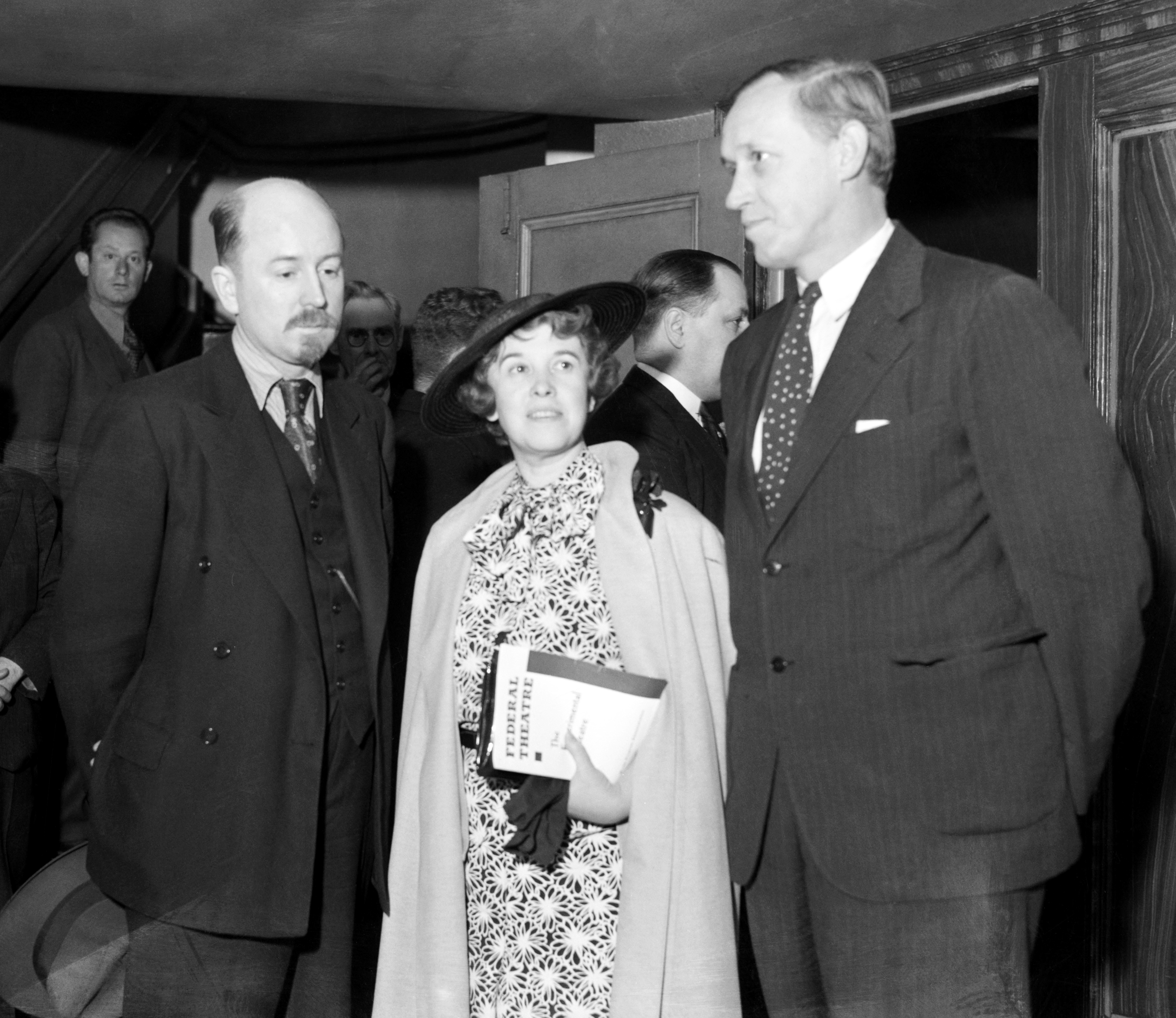
Geddes, Hallie Flanagan and Harry Hopkins at a performance of Chalk Dust (1936)

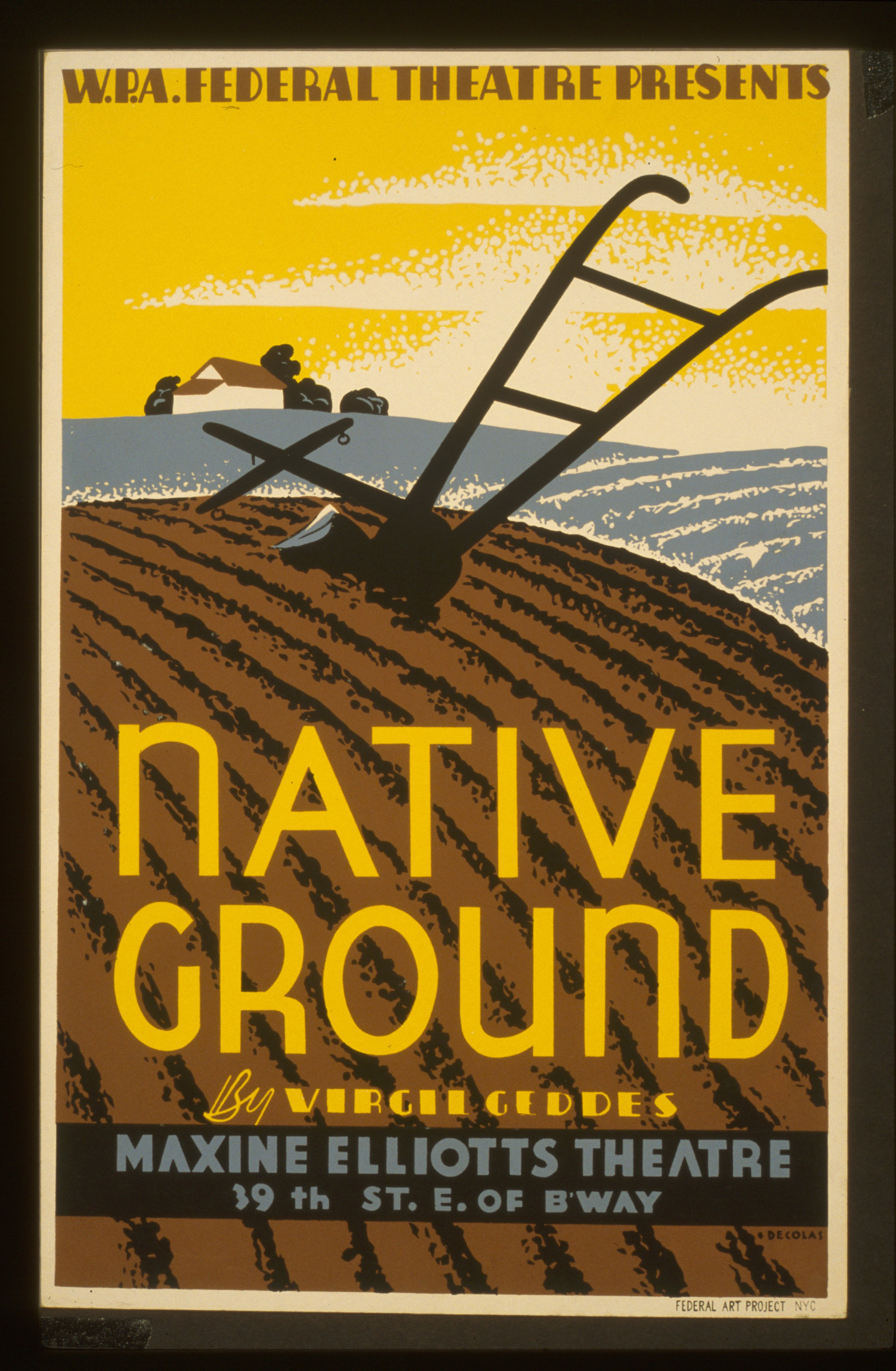
Poster for the Federal Theatre Project production of Native Ground (1937)

Virgil Geddes (1897–1989) was an American playwright.

Geddes grew up in rural Nebraska, the setting for his plays The Earth Between, and Native Ground. He did not go to college. He spent several years in Paris where he met and married writer Minna Besser Geddes (Vassar College), class on 1916. The couple moved to Brookfield, Connecticut in 1929.

Geddes, a member of several Communist organizations including the League of American Writers, Workers Film and Photo League (USA), and the League of Workers Theaters, was listed multiple times by the House Un-American Activities Committee in its 1948 Report.

Geddes established a theater company, The Brookfield Players. The company performed in an erstwhile tobacco barn, called the Brookfield County Playhouse, and both the company and the venue were referred to as the Brookfield Playhouse.

Geddes was the long-serving postmaster in Brookfield, a job he told the Hartford Courant that he took because it offered a steady income.

== Plays ==
- 1929: The Earth Between
  The Provincetown Playhouse presented this drama in March 1929. Bette Davis was cast in one of her first roles.
- 1929: Native Ground
  The Federal Theatre Project produced this play in 1937.
- 1933: Pocahontas and the Elders, A Folkpiece in Four Acts

== Books ==
- Collected poems of Virgil Geddes, National Poetry Foundation, 1977
- Country Postmaster, 1952
- The Melodramadness of Eugene O'Neill, Brookfield Players, 1934
