= Jim Barclay (field hockey) =

New Zealand hockey player (1933–1989)

Personal information
- Full name: James Barr Barclay
- Nationality: New Zealand
- Born: 6 June 1933 Te Awamutu, New Zealand
- Died: 1 May 1989 (aged 55)

Sport
- Sport: Field hockey

James Barr Barclay (6 June 1933 – 1 May 1989) was a New Zealand field hockey player. He competed in the men's tournament at the 1960 Summer Olympics. Barclay died on 1 May 1989, at the age of 55.
