= Frank Holmes (footballer) =

Australian rules footballer, born 1900

Personal information
- Full name: Frank Thomas Holmes
- Born: 1 April 1900; Wallan, Victoria
- Died: 30 May 1989 (aged 89); Glenroy, Victoria

Playing career^{1}
Years	Club	Games (Goals)
1930	North Melbourne	3 (0)
- ^{1} Playing statistics correct to the end of 1930.

Frank Thomas Holmes (1 April 1900 – 30 May 1989) was an Australian rules footballer who played with North Melbourne in the Victorian Football League (VFL).
