= List of people from Fairmont, West Virginia =

People from Clarksburg, West Virginia

This is a list of notable people who were born in, lived in, or are closely associated with the city of Fairmont, West Virginia.

== Athletics ==
- Tony Adamle, football player
- Max Balchowsky, prominent 1950s and 1960s American race car builder and driver
- David Carpenter, professional baseball player
- Ron Everhart, college basketball head coach
- Zach Frazier, football player
- Rashod Kent, football player
- Raphiael Putney, basketball player
- Mary Lou Retton, gymnast, 1984 Olympic gold medalist, member of President's Council on Physical Fitness and Sports
- Nick Saban, college football head coach and assistant coach in the NFL, born in Fairmont
- Dante Stills, football player
- Darius Stills, football player

== Arts, media, and entertainment ==
- Joe Cerisano, singer, songwriter, musician ("Be All That You Can Be", "Hands Across America")
- Art Finley, North American television and radio personality, mostly in San Francisco and Vancouver, remembered by many as "Mayor Art", host of children's show aired on KRON-TV in San Francisco from 1959 to 1966
- Johnnie Johnson, piano player and blues musician, member of Rock and Roll Hall of Fame
- Fuzzy Knight, film and television actor, appeared in over 180 films between 1929 and 1967, usually as a cowboy hero's sidekick
- John Knowles, author of A Separate Peace
- Stephen Montague, classical composer, lived in Fairmont as a child from 1952 to 1957
- Doris Piserchia, science fiction writer
- Jeffrey Tinnell, film producer
- Robert Tinnell, screenwriter, director, producer, author of comic books and graphic novels

== Military, politics and public service ==
- Frank J. Breth, United States Marine Corps brigadier general
- Augusta Clark, librarian, politician and lawyer; second African-American woman on Philadelphia City Council (1980–2000)
- Ann K. Covington, former chief justice of Supreme Court of Missouri, first woman to hold that position
- Mike DeVault, state legislator
- Frank Kendall Everest Jr., U.S. Air Force officer best remembered as aeroengineer and test pilot during 1950s; once known as "Fastest Man Alive"
- Aretas B. Fleming, 8th Governor of West Virginia
- Carrie Watson Fleming, First Lady of West Virginia, 1890–1893
- Frank Cruise Haymond, Judge of West Virginia Supreme Court of Appeals, 1945–1972
- Thomas Haymond, 19th Century congressman and lawyer
- Philip C. Jimeno, member of Maryland State Legislature
- Phil Mallow, West Virginia state delegate
- Alan Mollohan, U.S. Representative from West Virginia's 1st District
- Michael Oliverio II, member of state senate, representing 13th District
- Francis H. Pierpont, Governor of union controlled parts of Virginia during American Civil War, known as "father of West Virginia"
- Daniel Polsley, first Lieutenant Governor of the Restored Government of Virginia, U.S. Representative from West Virginia's 3rd Congressional District
- George S. Roberts, combat fighter pilot with the Tuskegee Airmen
- Charles W. Swisher, thirteenth Secretary of State of West Virginia
- Hershel W. Williams, awarded Medal of Honor during the Battle of Iwo Jima

== Science, education, and business ==
- Luella Mundel, professor and McCarthyism victim
- Rosemary M. Thomas, academic administrator
- Clarence Wayland Watson, founded several companies that became Consolidation Coal and Mining Companies, was U.S. Senator from West Virginia from 1911 to 1913
