= Alpha Company, Anti-Terrorism Battalion, 4th Marine Division =

Alpha Company is a United States Marine Corps unit based in Rochester, New York and a component of the Anti-Terrorism Battalion, 4th Marine Division. Before being attached to the Anti-Terrorism Battalion, the Rochester Marine unit was assigned to the 8th Tank Battalion. Alpha Company has been deployed multiple times, supporting operations related to the war on terror.

== Marine Corps Reserves ==
Marines in the 4th Marine Division are only required to conduct military training one weekend a month and two weeks during the summer. This allows the Marines to pursue full-time careers as civilians or go to college. Like all Marines, those in the reserves must attend boot camp at either Marine Corps Recruit Depot Parris Island or Marine Corps Recruit Depot San Diego. They undergo exactly the same training as those who have chosen active duty service, and must also attend the United States Marine Corps School of Infantry to learn basic infantry tactics, and must attend other schools if their job specialty requires it. All of their training is done alongside active duty Marines, and reserve Marines are held to the same standards that active duty Marines are held to. Reserve officers who have not been previously active duty are also required to complete the same training as active duty officers. Reserve officer candidates must complete Officer Candidate School in Quantico, Virginia, The Basic School, and their MOS school, they will be sent to their respective reserve units. Some of the Marines at Alpha Company are prior active duty Marines who have chosen to pursue other opportunities while still serving in the Marines.

== Korea and Desert Storm, 8th Tank Battalion ==
The 8th Tank Battalion was created in the fall of 1949, with the unit meeting in Syracuse, New York. When attached to the 8th Tank Battalion, Rochester was the location of the Headquarters and Service company. At the birth of the company, they trained with the M4A3E8, a tank designed under the M4 Sherman umbrella. The 8th Tank Battalion was deployed during the Korean War, comprising 520 Marines. Once arriving to their duty station in California, the Marines were divided into different units that were deploying to the Korean Theater. Four decades later, the Rochester Marines deployed in December 1990 to Southwest Asia, and saw combat in the Gulf War. Assigned to the 2nd Marine Division based in Camp Lejeune, the company provided support to the 6th and 8th Marine Regiments. While conducting combat missions in support of Desert Storm, the Rochester Marines captured an Iraqi Republican Guard T-72 tank. Following their return home, the 8th Tank Battalion was demobilized in March 1991, resulting in a five-year transition period for the Rochester Marines to upgrade their equipment, while also operating with a much smaller training allowance. The captured Iraqi tank now resides outside of the headquarters of Alpha Company. Although the 8th Tank Battalion is no longer in active service, the Iraqi T-72 serves as a reminder of the 8th Tank Battalion's history and accomplishments

== Anti-terrorism Battalion ==
The Anti-Terrorism Battalion was put into active service on October 29, 2004. The idea behind the newly formed battalion was to have Marines and sailors capable of rapidly deploying in response to terror threats. The Marines were to receive additional training essential in counter terror missions, such as counter-intelligence, advanced training in urban combat, and the ability to respond to nuclear, biological, and chemical weapons of mass destruction threats. The mission of the battalion is to detect, deter, and defend against terrorism. The active duty component of ATBN was deactivated in 2007, shifting the Marines in the battalion to 2nd Battalion 9th Marines, which was deactivated in 1994. The Marine Corps was able to create new battalions because of additional military spending due to the wars in Iraq and Afghanistan, allowing the Marines to expand its numbers to slightly above 200,000

=== Djibouti ===
A platoon of Marines from Alpha Company deployed to Djibouti, and returned from the deployment in the spring of 2007. The United States military has a base, Camp Lemonnier, in Djibouti to support humanitarian and counter-terrorism operations around the Horn of Africa. Deployments to the area began in early 2002 in support of Operation Enduring Freedom and other American military missions in the region. The US State Department also provides humanitarian assistance to Djibouti, which has become an important trading partner in the region. Despite help from the American government in multiple forms of economic and military aid, the country struggles with a large amount of unusable desert land, refugees from Ethiopia due to civil wars, and a 50% unemployment rate.

== Iraq ==
Alpha Company deployed to Iraq in 2009, attached to 3rd Battalion 3rd Marines. They made up Task Force Military Police, responsible for convoy security in the Al Anbar province. During the deployment, 3/3 was involved in recovering the remains of Navy pilot Scott Speicher, who was shot down but body was never located during Operation Desert Storm. President Barack Obama said of the discovery, "I am grateful to the Marines who pursued the information that led to Captain Speicher's recovery so that he can now come home." Alpha Company was awarded the Navy Unit Commendation for its role in the recovering of the pilot's body. After seven months in Iraq, Alpha Company returned to Rochester, suffering no casualties After seven years in Iraq, the Marine Corps officially ended all operations in the country in January 2010, handing the responsibilities over to the Army. Doing so allowed the Marines to focus its resources solely on the war in Afghanistan. The United States formally ended all combat operations and withdrew its forces from Iraq December 18, 2011. Following the end of the war, President Obama said to the final troops leaving Iraq "Iraq's future will be in the hands of its people. America’s war in Iraq is over... On behalf of a grateful nation, I'm proud to finally say these two words: Welcome home."

=== Iraq awards ===
For the Iraq deployment, the company was awarded the Navy Sea Service Deployment Ribbon, Global War on Terrorism Expeditionary Medal and the Armed Forces Reserve Medal.

== Deactivation ==
Alpha Company, Anti-Terrorism Battalion was deactivated along with the last remaining elements of the battalion in September 2013.
