= Operation Keystone Eagle =

Operation Keystone Eagle was the withdrawal of the initial units of the 3rd Marine Division from South Vietnam and their redeployment to Okinawa, taking place from 29 June to 30 August 1969.

== Background ==
Following from the policy of Vietnamization, U.S. President Richard Nixon sought to reduce U.S. forces in South Vietnam. After a visit to South Vietnam in March 1969, Secretary of Defense Melvin Laird recommended that planning begin for the withdrawal of 50–70,000 U.S. troops in 1969 with further withdrawals in 1970. MACV began planning for the withdrawal of 50,000 troops or approximately two Divisions plus support units in late 1969. In late May the Joint Chiefs of Staff presented Laird with a plan for the phased withdrawal of 244,000 of the total 549,000 U.S. personnel in South Vietnam with the withdrawal of 50,000 troops in late 1969 comprising one Marine Division and one Army Division. Laird forwarded the plan to Nixon in early June with the recommendation that 20–25,000 troops be withdrawn starting in July. MACV had determined that the first units to be withdrawn would be the 3rd Marine Division and the 9th Infantry Division. On 8 June, Nixon met South Vietnamese President Nguyễn Văn Thiệu on Midway Island and Nixon convinced Thiệu to accept the fact of U.S. force reductions, following the meeting Nixon announced the beginning of unilateral U.S. troop withdrawals.

The initial withdrawal named Operation Keystone Eagle was the withdrawal of one Regimental Landing Team, however the selected Regiment, the 9th Marine Regiment and its supporting units did not meet the 8388-man level mandated by MACV and so additional support and miscellaneous units were added to make up the numbers.

== Operation ==
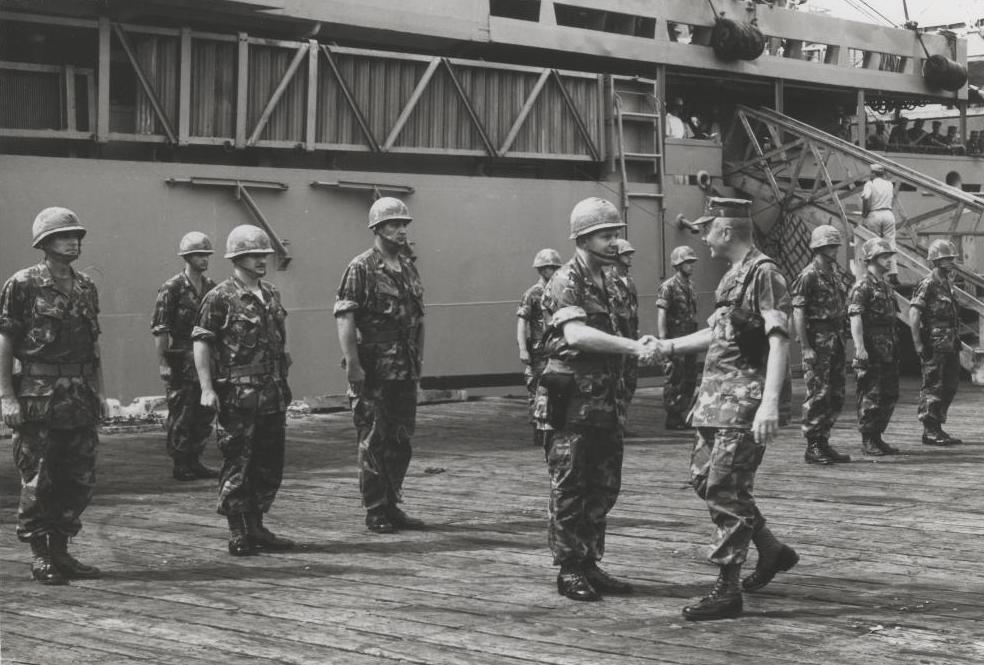
3rd Marine Division commander MG William K. Jones farewells 2/9 Marines commander Lt Col. Robert J Modjeski

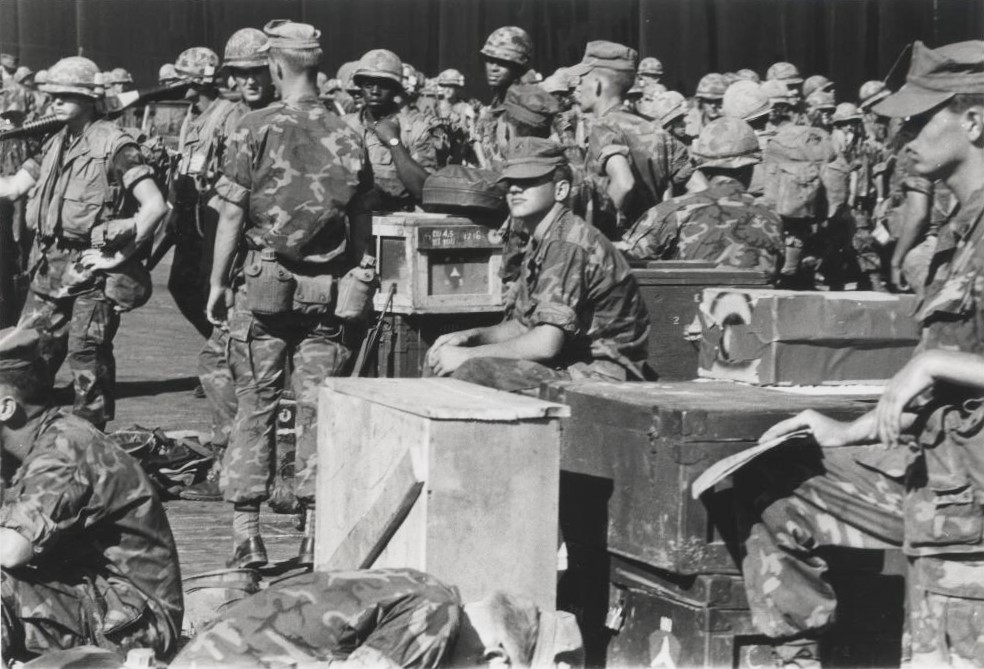
2/9 Marines wait to board USS Paul Revere

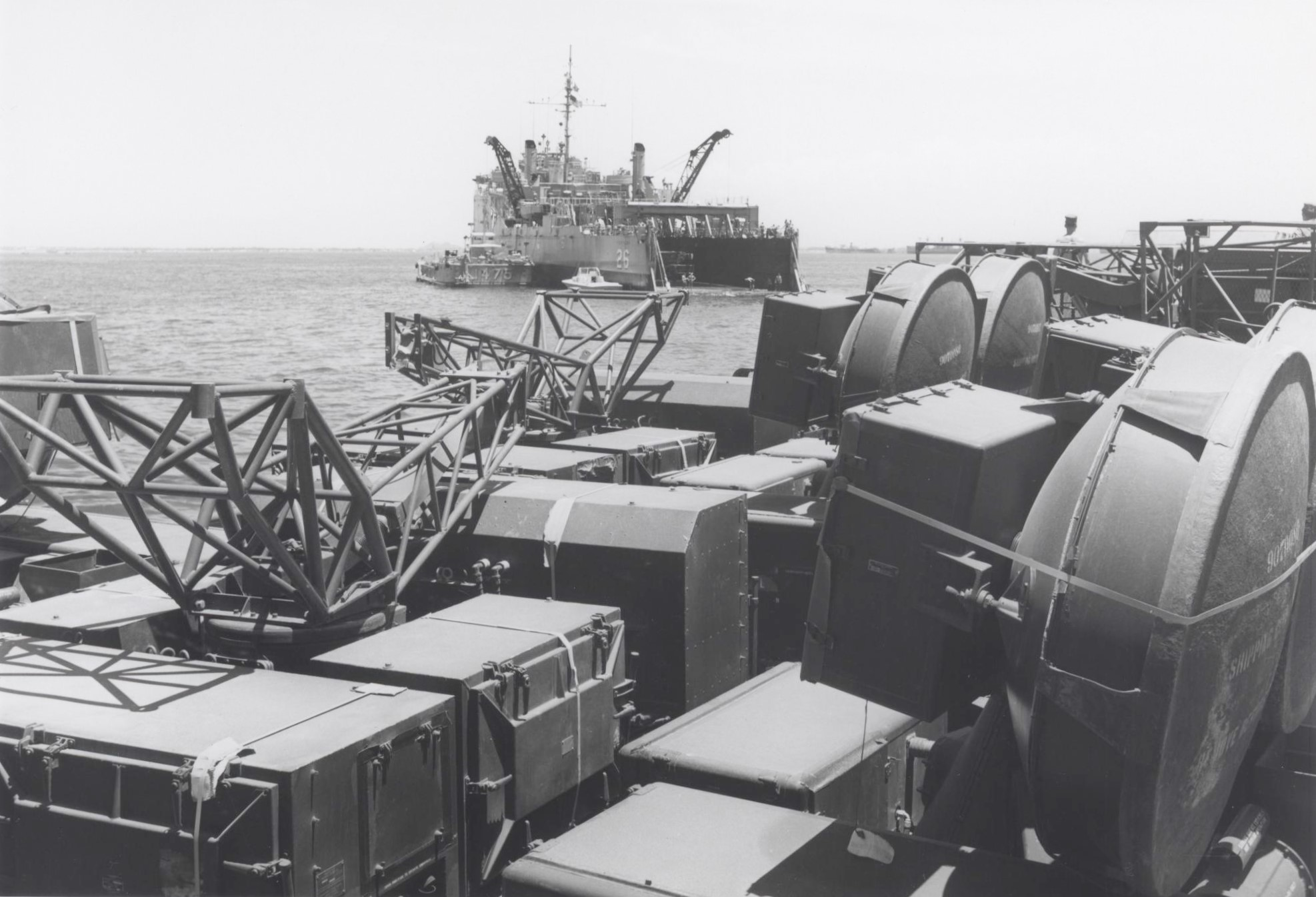
Equipment of the 1st LAAM Battalion on board a ship in Da Nang Harbour

On 14 June the 9th Marine Regiment was notified of its redeployment. On 23 June after completing its involvement in Operation Utah Mesa, the 1st Battalion, 9th Marines stood down at Vandegrift Combat Base. On 14 July following a farewell ceremony at Da Nang, the 1/9 Marines boarded the USS Paul Revere, becoming the first U.S. battalion to be withdrawn.

The Keystone Eagle redeployments took place as follows:

Departure Date	Unit	Strength
29 June 1969	3rd Anti-Tank Battalion	19
13 July 1969	Companies A, B & C (Reinforced), 3rd Motor Transport Battalion	167
13 July 1969	Company C (Reinforced), 3rd Tank Battalion	74
13 July 1969	Detachment, 3rd Dental Company	1
13 July 1969	1st Amphibian Tractor Battalion	135
13 July 1969	Battery D, 2nd Battalion, 12th Marine Regiment	139
13 July 1969	Company C, 11th Engineer Battalion	180
14 July 1969	1st Battalion, 9th Marines	1166
14 July 1969	1st Searchlight Battery	116
15 July 1969	Company B (Reinforced), 3rd Medical Battalion	42
15 July 1969	Company D (Reinforced), 11th Engineer Battalion	175
15 July 1969	Company C (Reinforced), 3rd Shore Party Battalion	144
15 July 1969	1st Armed Amphibian Company	42
15 July 1969	Headquarters Battery, Field Artillery Group	24
15 July 1969	Detachment, Marine Air Traffic Control Unit	23
30 July 1969	Company C (Reinforced), 3rd Engineer Battalion	257
31 July 1969	Detachment, Headquarters Battery, 12th Marine Regiment	21
31 July 1969	Battery E, 2/12 Marines	139
31 July 1969	Headquarters Battery, 2/12 Marines	161
1 August 1969	2nd Battalion, 9th Marines	1166
1 August 1969	Headquarters Company, 9th Marine Regiment	234
5 August 1969	Detachment, Headquarters Battalion, 3rd Marine Division	354
12 August 1969	Detachment, Force Logistics Command	150
13 August 1969	3rd Battalion, 9th Marines	1166
13 August 1969	Battery F, 2/12 Marines	139
13 August 1969	Battery L, 4/12 Marines	112
13 August 1969	Company C (Reinforced), 3rd Reconnaissance Battalion	120
13 August 1969	Detachment, Headquarters Company, 9th Marine Regiment	20
14 August 1969	Company A (Reinforced), 9th Motor Transport Battalion	130
14 August 1969	HMM-165	279
16 August 1969	1st Light Antiaircraft Missile Battalion	661
30 August 1969	VMFA-334	388

== Aftermath ==
Operation Keystone Eagle concluded on 30 August 1969, it was immediately followed by Operation Keystone Cardinal.

1/9 Marines and 3/9 Marines would return to South Vietnam in April 1972 during the Easter Offensive and in April 1975 during Operation Frequent Wind.
