= 2/9 =

2/9 may refer to:

- February 9 (month-day date notation)
- September 2 (day-month date notation)
- 2nd Battalion, 9th Marines, an infantry battalion of the United States Marine Corps
