= Wilson D. Watson =

US Marine Corps Medal of Honor recipient (1922–1994)

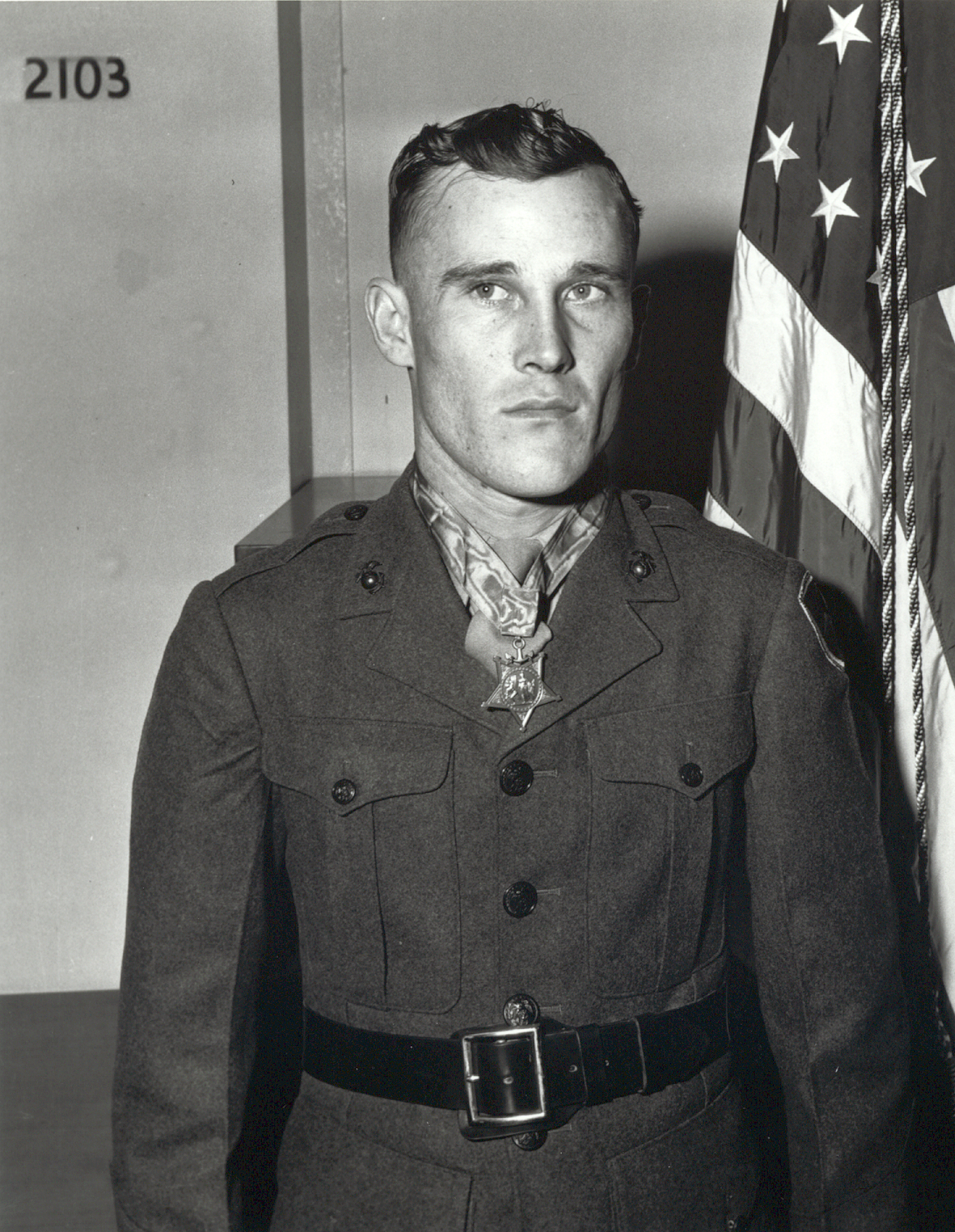
- Watson circa 1945
- Born: February 16, 1922; Tuscumbia, Alabama
- Died: December 19, 1994 (aged 72); Russellville, Arkansas
- Burial place: Russell Cemetery, Ozone, Arkansas
- Military career
- Allegiance: United States of America
- Branch: United States Marine Corps; United States Army
- Service years: USMC (1942-1946); USAAF (1946 - ?); US Army (?-1966)
- Rank: Private (Marine Corps); Staff Sergeant (Army)
- Nicknames: Doug; One-Man Regiment
- Units: 2nd Battalion, 9th Marines
- Conflicts: World War II: Battle of Bougainville; Battle of Guam; Battle of Iwo Jima
- Awards: Medal of Honor; Purple Heart

Wilson Douglas Watson (February 16, 1922 – December 19, 1994) was a United States Marine Corps private who received the Medal of Honor for his actions on Iwo Jima during World War II. He single-handedly killed 60 (Note: Sources are divided as to whether the number of soldiers is 60 or 90) enemy soldiers, thus enabling his platoon to advance, earning him the name "One-Man Regiment of Iwo Jima". After World War II, Watson continued his military service in the United States Army. At the time he retired, he held the rank of Staff Sergeant.

== Biography ==
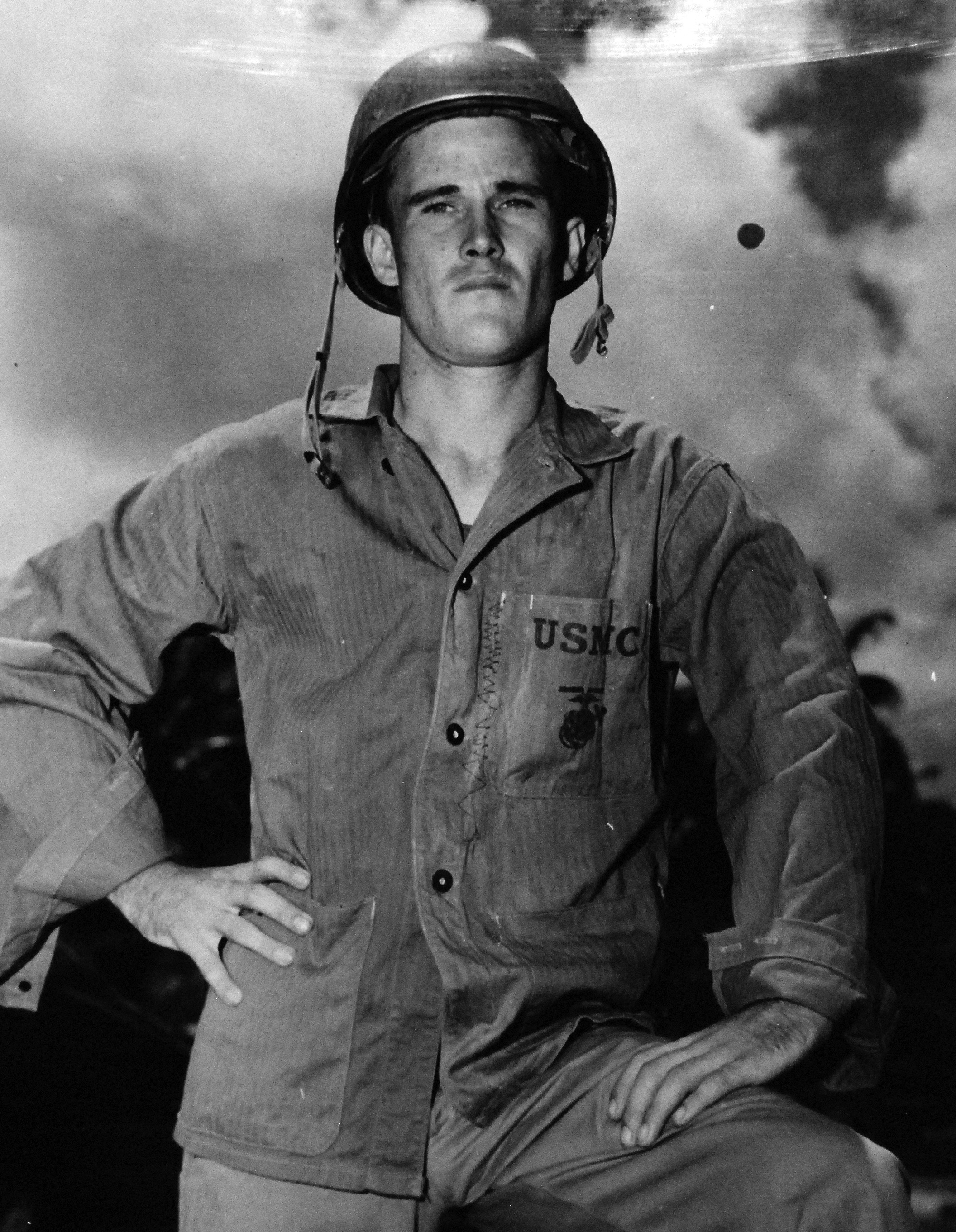
Watson during his time in the USMC

Wilson Douglas "Doug" Watson was born on February 18, 1922, to Charles Watson and Ada Watson (née Posey), in Tuscumbia, Alabama. He is one of twelve kids; eight brothers, three sisters. Before his enlistment in Little Rock, Arkansas, on August 6, 1942, he worked on his father's farm and completed seven years of grade school. Watson received his basic training at Marine Corps Recruit Depot San Diego, California, and was deployed overseas on January 24, 1943.

Serving as an automatic rifleman with Company G, 2nd Battalion, 9th Marines, 3rd Marine Division during the bitter fighting on Iwo Jima, Watson earned the Medal of Honor for heroism during February 26–27, 1945, when he single-handedly killed more than 60 Japanese and enabled his pinned-down platoon to continue the advance. In the attack, he was shot seven times and was hit in the shoulder by mortar fragments. He was evacuated from Iwo Jima after he suffered a gunshot wound to the neck on March 2, 1945. He previously saw action at Bougainville, Guadalcanal, and Guam.

Private Watson was presented the Medal of Honor by President Harry S. Truman on October 5, 1945, at the White House.

Following his discharge from the Marine Corps, he enlisted in the United States Army Air Force, and then the United States Army as a private, working as a mess hall cook. In 1963, he was arrested in Marion, Arkansas and charged with desertion after being reported missing from his post in Fort Rucker, Alabama in October 1962. When asked about his leaving, Watson stated he just got "fed up" with the Army and left. He eventually reached the rank of Staff Sergeant and finally retired from the military in 1966.

He was married to wife Patricia, whom he had two children with.

Watson died on December 19, 1994, in Russellville, Arkansas.

== Medal of Honor citation ==
The President of the United States takes pleasure in presenting the MEDAL OF HONOR to

PRIVATE WILSON D. WATSON
UNITED STATES MARINE CORPS RESERVE

for service as set forth in the following CITATION:

For conspicuous gallantry and intrepidity at the risk of his life above and beyond the call of duty as Automatic Rifleman serving with the Second Battalion, Ninth Marines, Third Marine Division, during action against enemy Japanese forces on Iwo Jima, Volcano Islands, 26 and 27 February 1945. With his squad abruptly halted by intense fire from enemy fortifications in the high rocky ridges and crags commanding the line of advance, Private Watson boldly rushed one pillbox and fired into the embrasure with his weapon, keeping the enemy pinned down single-handedly until he was in a position to hurl in a grenade and then running to the rear of the emplacement to destroy the retreating Japanese and enable his platoon to take its objective. Again pinned down at the foot of a small hill, he dauntlessly scaled the jagged incline under fierce mortar and machine-gun barrages and with his assistant automatic rifleman charged the crest of the hill, firing from his hip. Fighting furiously against Japanese troops attacking with grenades and knee-mortars from the reverse slope, he stood fearlessly erect in his exposed position to cover the hostile entrenchments and held the hill under savage fire for fifteen minutes, killing sixty Japanese before his ammunition was exhausted and his platoon was able to join him. His courageous initiative and valiant fighting spirit against devastating odds were directly responsible for the continued advance of his platoon and his inspiring leadership throughout this bitterly fought action reflects the highest credit upon Private Watson and the United States Naval Service.

/S/ HARRY S. TRUMAN

== Cultural influence ==
Watson was credited with giving actor John Wayne his inspiration for his "shoot from the hip" style in his films. Wayne heard of Watson's style after hearing about how Watson charged the crest of a hill on Iwo Jima, firing from his hip.

== See also ==
- List of Medal of Honor recipients
- List of Medal of Honor recipients for World War II
- List of Medal of Honor recipients for the Battle of Iwo Jima
