= 1st Searchlight Battery (United States) =

- Country: United States
- Branch: USMC
- Part of: 12th Marine Regiment; 3rd Marine Division
- Garrison/HQ: MCAGCC 29 Palms
- Engagements: Vietnam War

1st Searchlight Battery was a United States Marine Corps unit formed during the Vietnam War to monitor the "Electronic Wall of Defense" that was set up along the Vietnamese Demilitarized Zone. They fell under the 12th Marine Regiment and the 3rd Marine Division.

== History ==
1st Searchlight Battery was a new unit organized, supervised and controlled by the United States Secretary of Defense, Robert McNamara and was part of the "Electronic Wall of Defense".

The Battery began at Marine Corps Base Twentynine Palms, California. It was the first unit in the history of the Marine Corps with infrared/xeon arc technology searchlights.

There were 122 men in the Battery: 6 Officers, 113 Enlisted and 3 Enlisted U.S. Navy Corpsmen. Commanding Officer was Captain Victor B. Snider.

Deployed to South Vietnam on the USS Paul Revere, departing the continental limits of the United States from National City, California, on May 31, 1967. All personnel had "Secret" security clearance.

== Vietnam ==
On June 27, 1967, the Battery arrived in Da Nang, South Vietnam. At 05:30 on June 28 it departed Da Nang for Đông Hà Combat Base, arriving there on June 29. The Battery HQ was built in Đông Hà.

Attached to 12th Marine Regiment, 3d Marine Division (Rein) FMF.

== Equipment ==
There were 18 M274 Mechanical Mules converted with generators and the searchlight. Each searchlight had a 23" Dual Blade. They had infrared (viewed with M-18 binoculars) and white light capability. The white light had a Xenon Arc, with 75 million candlepower.

On July 3 the Battery began deployment of the 3 platoons to seven areas of the Quảng Trị Province/I Corps: Con Thien, Cửa Việt, Khe Sanh, Gio Linh, Đông Hà, Cam Lộ, Camp Carroll and Thừa Thiên Provinces: (Phu Bai and Camp Evans).

The primary use of the searchlight was for perimeter defense. The lights were also used in six major combat operations with excellent results.

== Combat history ==
Significant operations participated in:

- Apache Snow
- Ardmore
- Bear Claw
- Buffalo
- Cameron Falls
- Choctaw
- Cimarron
- Concordia Square
- Con Thien
- Dawson River
- Dewey Canyon
- Dyemarker
- Ellis Ravine
- Fremont
- Herkimer Mountain
- Hickory II
- Highrise
- Iroquois Grove
- Kingfisher
- Kentucky
- Lancaster II
- Liberty
- Marshall Mountain
- Maine Crag
- Massachusetts Bay
- Montana Mauler
- Napoleon
- Neosho
- Pegasus
- Purple Martin
- Saline
- Saline II
- Scotland
- Scotland II
- Rice
- Thor
- Utah Mesa
- Virginia Ridge
