= VMFA-334 =

Marine Fighter Attack Squadron 334
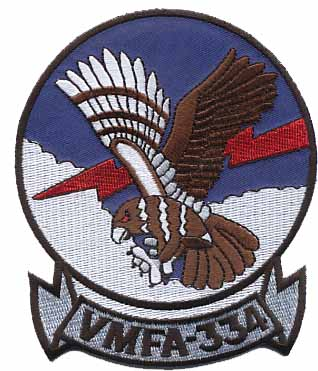
- VMFA-334 Insignia
- Active: 1 Aug 1943 – 10 Oct 1944; 31 May 1952 – 30 Dec 1971
- Country: United States of America
- Branch: United States Marine Corps
- Type: Attack
- Role: Close air support Air interdiction Aerial reconnaissance
- Part of: Deactivated
- Nickname(s): Falcons; Death Dealers (WWII)
- Tail Code: WU
- Engagements: World War II; Vietnam War

Aircraft flown
- Bomber: SBD Dauntless
- Fighter: F9F Panther; FJ Fury; F-8 Crusader; F-4J Phantom II

Marine Fighter Attack Squadron 334 (VMFA-334) was a United States Marine Corps fighter squadron. Known as the "Falcons", it was part of Marine Aircraft Group 15 and Marine Aircraft Group 33. The squadron participated in action during World War II and the Vietnam War and was decommissioned in 1971.

== History ==
=== Early years ===
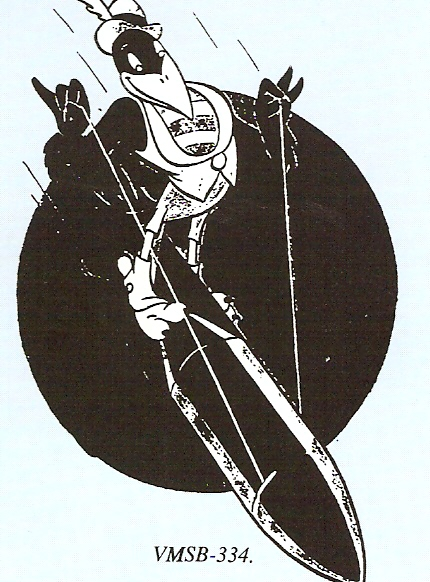
Squadron logo during WWII when they were VMSB-334

Marine Scout Bomber Squadron 334 (VMSB-334) was commissioned on 1 August 1943 at Marine Corps Air Station Cherry Point flying the Douglas SBD Dauntless. The squadron traveled around the United States for a year training until it was decommissioned on 10 October 1944, a day that many other scout bomber squadrons were deactivated.

=== Post World War II years ===
Marine Attack Squadron 334 (VMA-334) was reactivated on 31 May 1952 at Marine Corps Air Station Miami as part of the general increase in the United States military brought on by the Korean War. At this time they were equipped with the F6F Hellcat, later with the F4U Corsair, then the F9F Panther. Less than two years later, on 23 January 1954, the squadron transitioned to the FJ Fury and was redesignated Marine Fighter Squadron 334 {VMF-334}.

VMF-334’s first overseas deployment came in early 1957 when it was sent to Naval Air Station Atsugi for more than a year. The squadron returned to Marine Corps Air Station El Toro in January 1958 where it became the first West Coast squadron to transition to the F8U-1 Crusader.

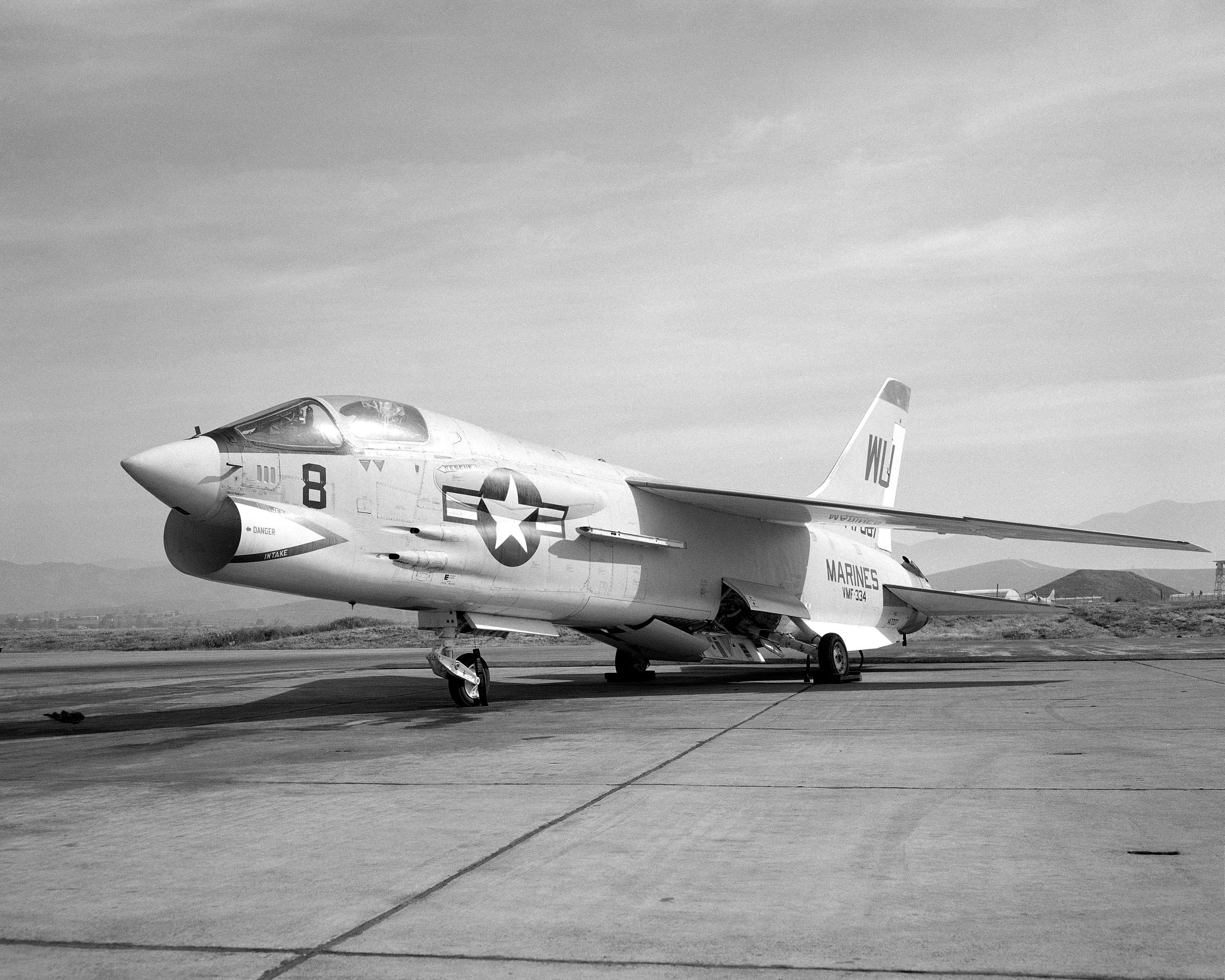
A F-8 Crusader from VMF-334 on the ramp at MCAS El Toro in 1966.

=== Vietnam War ===
The Falcons were re-designated Marine Fighter Attack Squadron 334 (VMFA-334) on 1 August 1967 and again transitioned airframes to the F-4J Phantom II. The Falcons departed MCAS El Toro on 20 August 1968. The squadron arrived at Da Nang Air Base on 1 September and combat operations began almost immediately. VMFA-334 relocated to Chu Lai early in 1969. VMFA-334 remained in Vietnam until September 1969 when they were relocated to Marine Corps Air Station Iwakuni, Japan. From there they flew air support over the US Navy intelligence ship the USS Pueblo, which had been attacked and captured by North Korea.

In March 1971 VMFA-334 returned to MCAS El Toro and was decommissioned later that year on 30 December 1971.

== See also ==
- United States Marine Corps Aviation
- List of active United States Marine Corps aircraft squadrons
- List of decommissioned United States Marine Corps aircraft squadrons
