= Vietnamese Demilitarized Zone =

Area separating North and South Vietnam (1954–1976)

Coordinates: 16.9°N 107.0°E

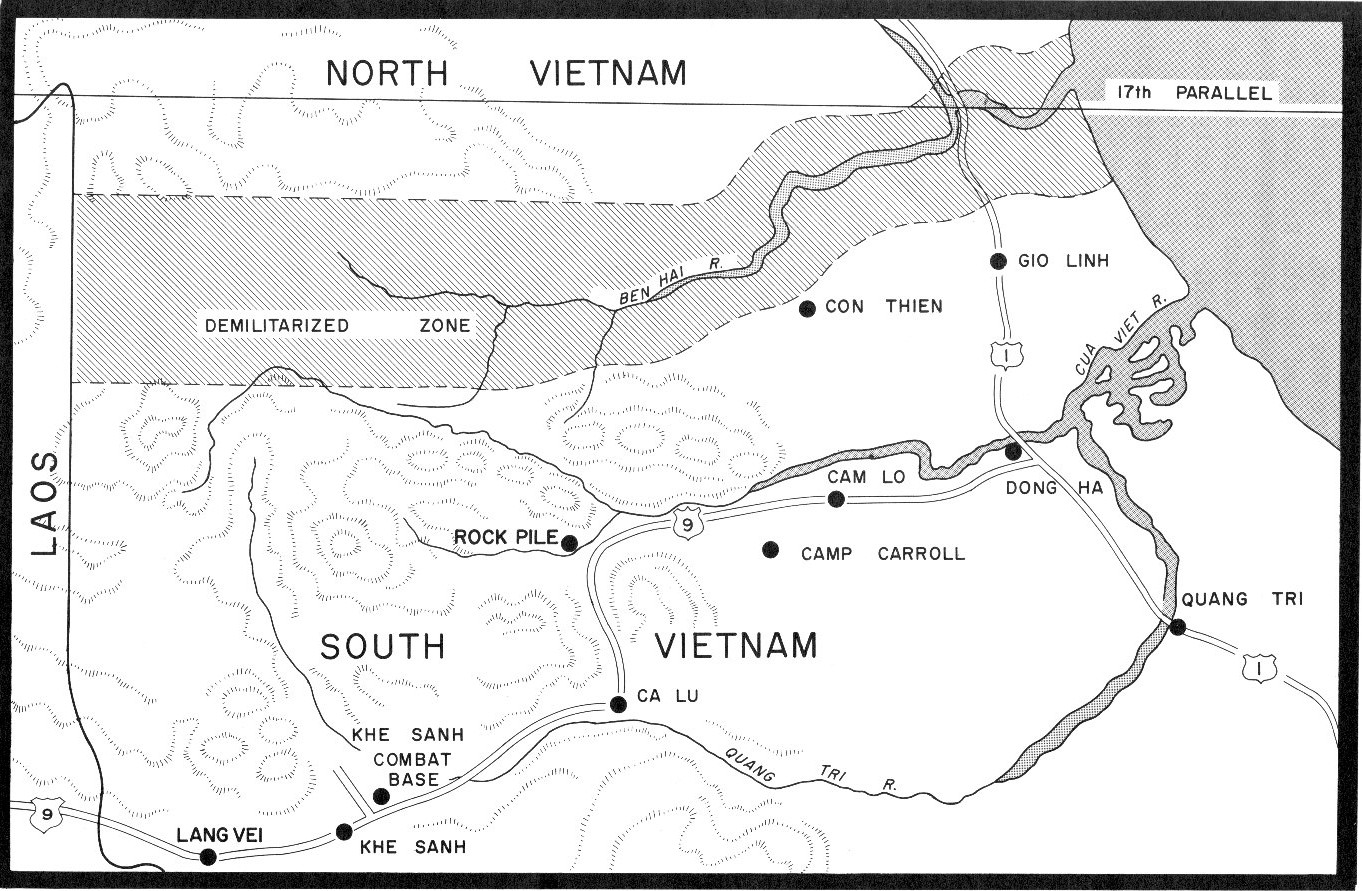
1969 map of the Demilitarized Zone

The Vietnamese Demilitarized Zone, abbreviated as V-DMZ, was a demilitarized zone at the 17th parallel in Quảng Trị province that was the dividing line between North Vietnam and South Vietnam from 21 July 1954 to 2 July 1976, when Vietnam was officially divided into two de facto countries, which was two de jure military gathering areas supposed to be sustained in the short term after the First Indochina War.

During the Vietnam War (1955–1975) it became important as the battleground demarcation between communist North Vietnam and anti-communist South Vietnam. The zone de jure ceased to exist with the reunification of Vietnam in 1976 (de facto in 1975).

== Geography ==
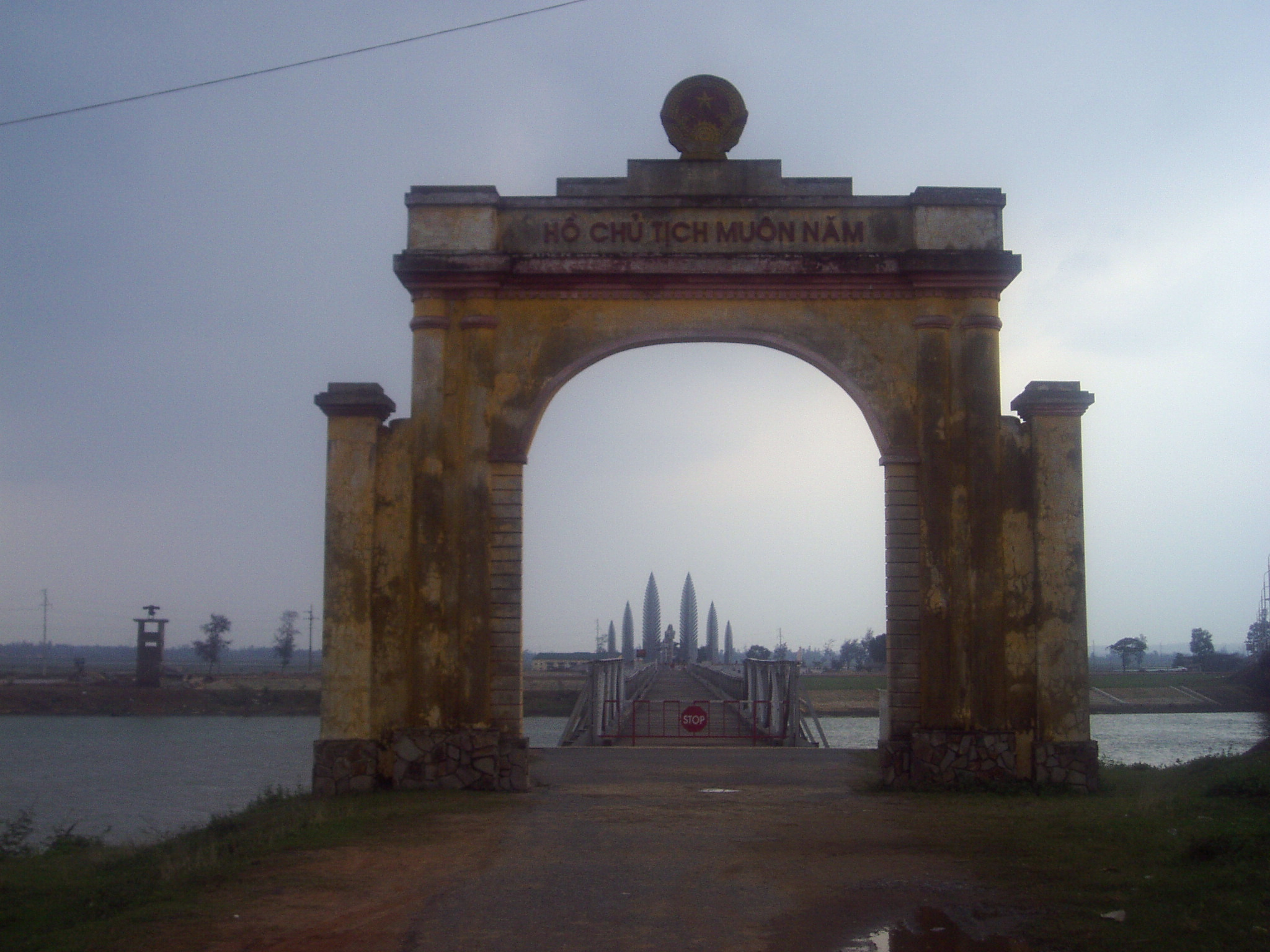
Photo taken from the north side of the DMZ at the Route 1 crossing. The guard tower on the left is a re-creation and spires seen in the distance through the arch are a new monument.

The border between North and South Vietnam was 76.1 kilometers (47.3 mi) in length and ran from east to west near the middle of present-day Vietnam within Quảng Trị province. Beginning in the west at the tripoint with Laos, it ran east in a straight line until reaching the village of Bo Ho Su on the Bến Hải River. The line then followed this river as it flowed in a broadly northeastwards direction out to the Gulf of Tonkin. Either side of the line was a Demilitarized Zone, forming a buffer of about 5 km per side in width. Although it was nominally described as being at "the 17th parallel," the border never actually followed that line, only straddling the general area of that line of latitude.

== History ==
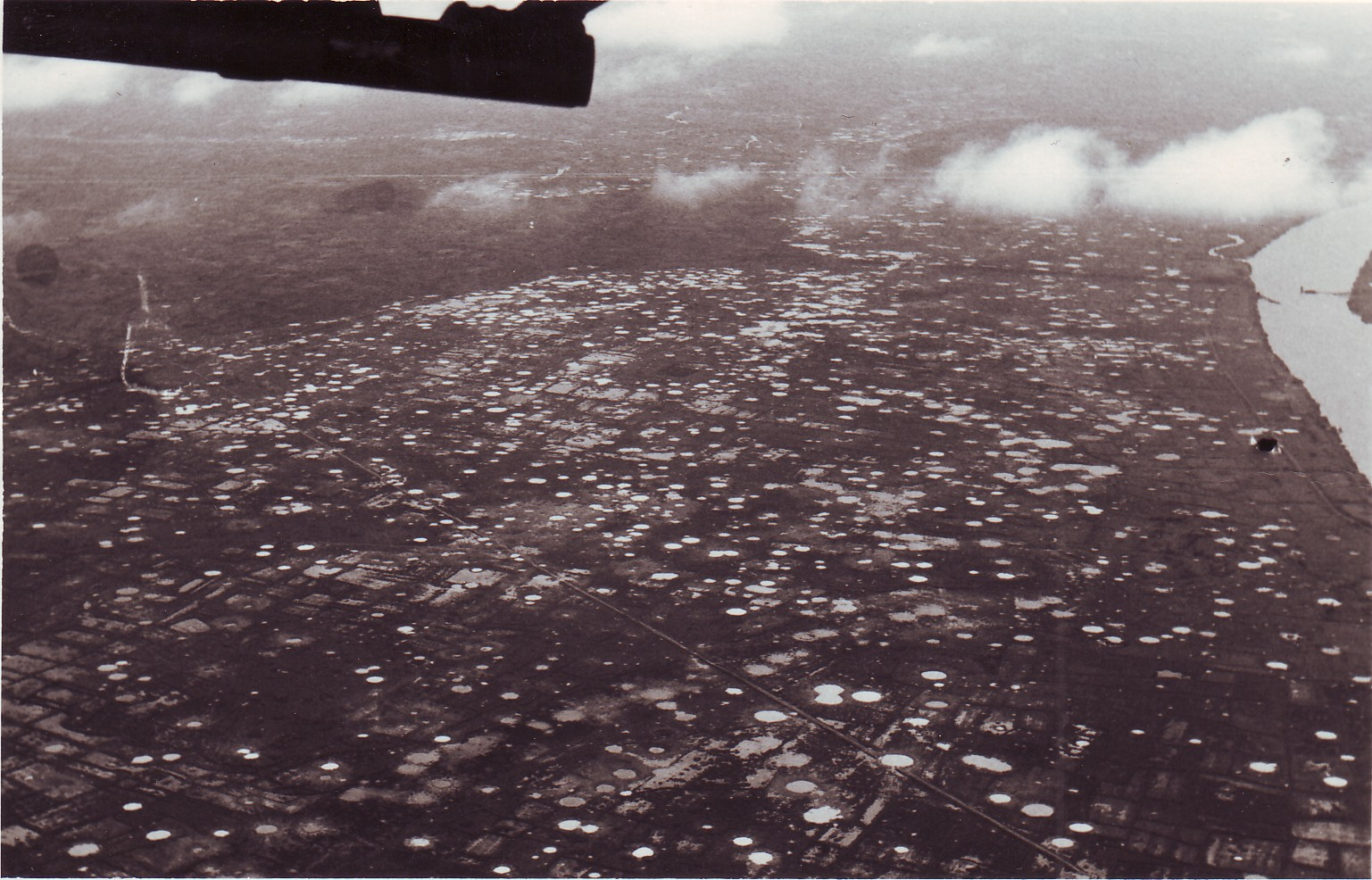
The Demilitarized Zone between North and South Vietnam, March 1968, looking west toward Laos.

The First Indochina War (also called the French Indochina War) was fought in French Indochina where was usually and shortly called "Indochina" from 1946 to 1954 between the French Union (including the anti-communist State of Vietnam) aided by the US on the one side, and the communist-dominated Viet Minh/Democratic Republic of Vietnam and allies (aided by China) on the other. The Viet Minh won the war after their victory in Dien Bien Phu on 7 May 1954. On 21 July 1954, the State of Vietnam gave up its control of Vietnam when the agreement between France and the Democratic Republic of Vietnam in Geneva took effect, Vietnam was de facto divided into two countries: North Vietnam (Democratic Republic of Vietnam, capital Hanoi) and South (State of Vietnam, capital Saigon).

The postcolonial conditions of Vietnam were set at the Geneva Conference of 1954, and an agreement about Vietnam (as parts of the three agreements about French Indochina) was signed between France and the Democratic Republic of Vietnam on 21 July 1954. The agreement reflected the military situation on the ground: the northern part of Vietnam, which was almost entirely controlled by the Viet Minh, became the Democratic Republic of Vietnam, under the communist leader Ho Chi Minh. The southern part of Vietnam, where the Viet Minh controlled only relatively small and remote areas, became the independent State of Vietnam under Bảo Đại, the last scion of the old Vietnamese imperial house. The State of Vietnam later became the Republic of Vietnam after the 1955 South Vietnam referendum, ruled by Ngo Dinh Diem. A temporary boundary, running primarily along the Ben Hai River was established pending elections, with the area on either side of the border declared a demilitarized zone. Troops of both governments were barred from that area.

After war between North and South Vietnam broke out in 1955 – one year after the division – the DMZ hardened into a de facto international boundary. The war itself evolved into a proxy conflict of the Cold War and millions of American and allied soldiers were sent to the country to help the anti-communist government of South Vietnam against communist North Vietnam from 1965 to 1973. Despite the DMZ's supposed status, 3rd Marine Division intelligence estimated that the combat strength of North Vietnamese Army and the Viet Cong (a nominally independent militant group aligned with North Vietnam against the South Vietnamese government) in the DMZ area in January 1968 was 40,943 troops.

The North was ultimately victorious in the war and the Republic of Vietnam's government collapsed on 30 April 1975. The DMZ ceased to exist after the reunification of the two Vietnamese countries under communist regimes: First the Republic of South Vietnam (de facto controlled by the Viet Cong and the North) and the Democratic Republic of Vietnam, then full reunification as the communist Socialist Republic of Vietnam on 2 July 1976.

== Gallery ==
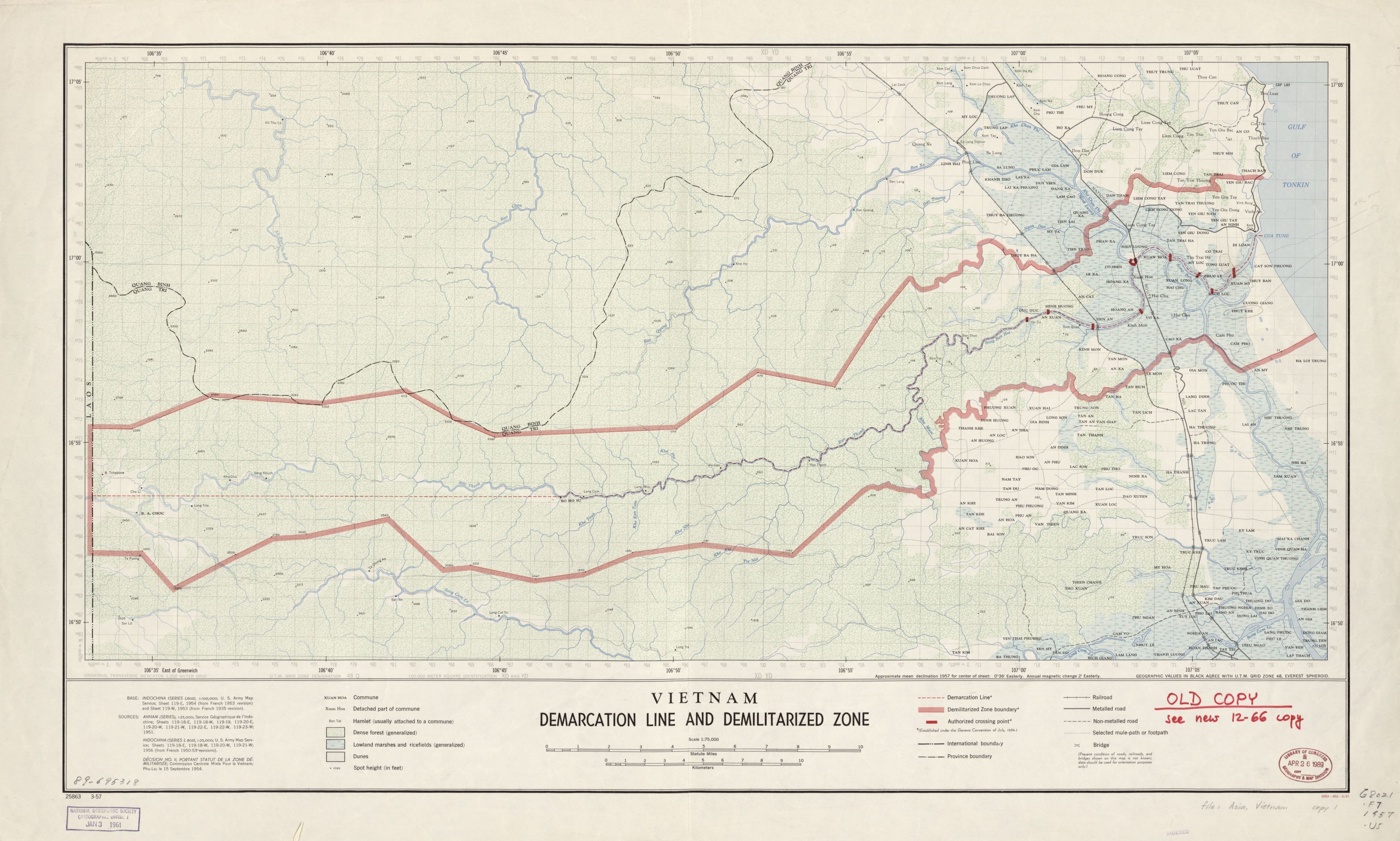
Map of the DMZ from 1957

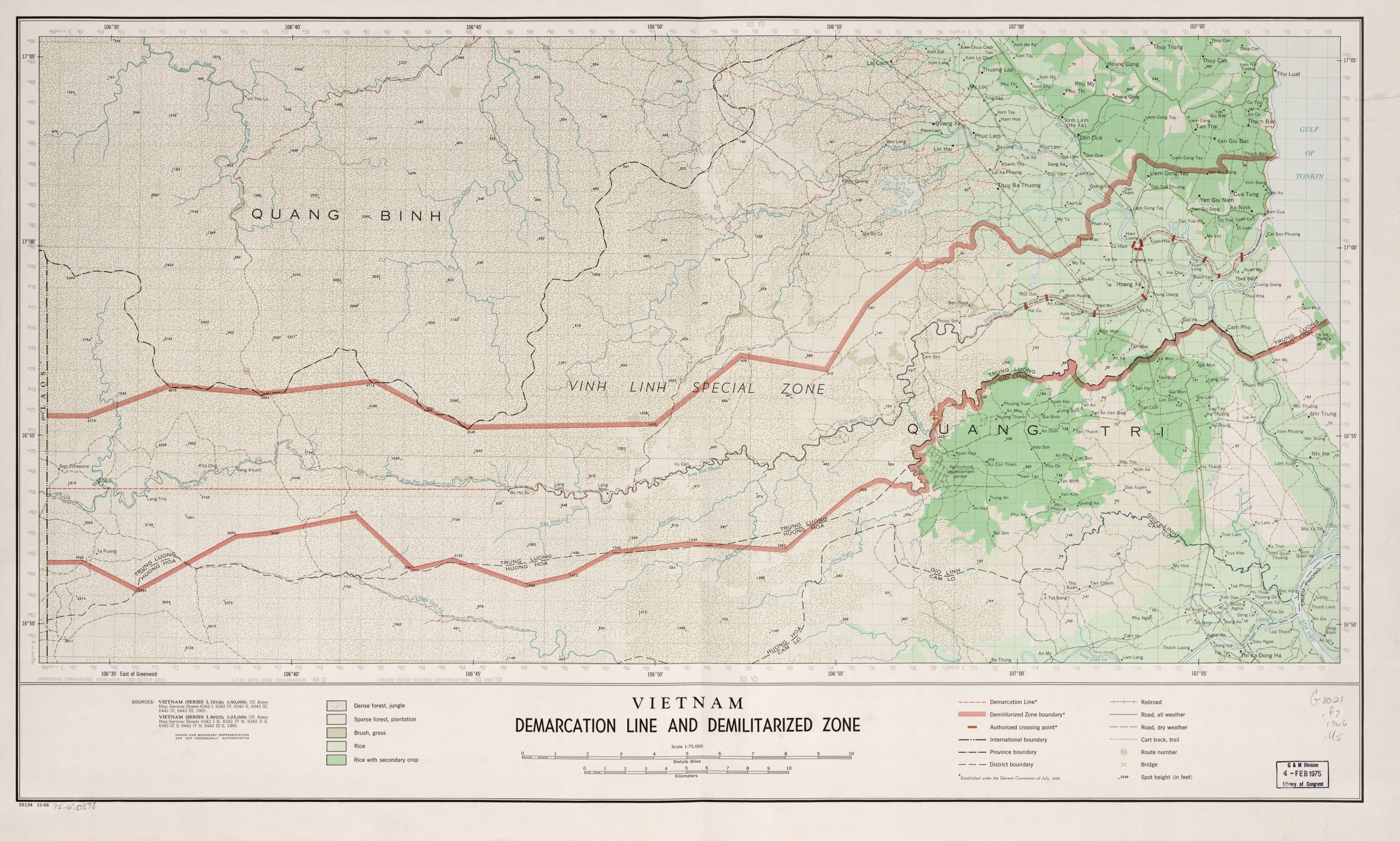
Map of the DMZ from 1966

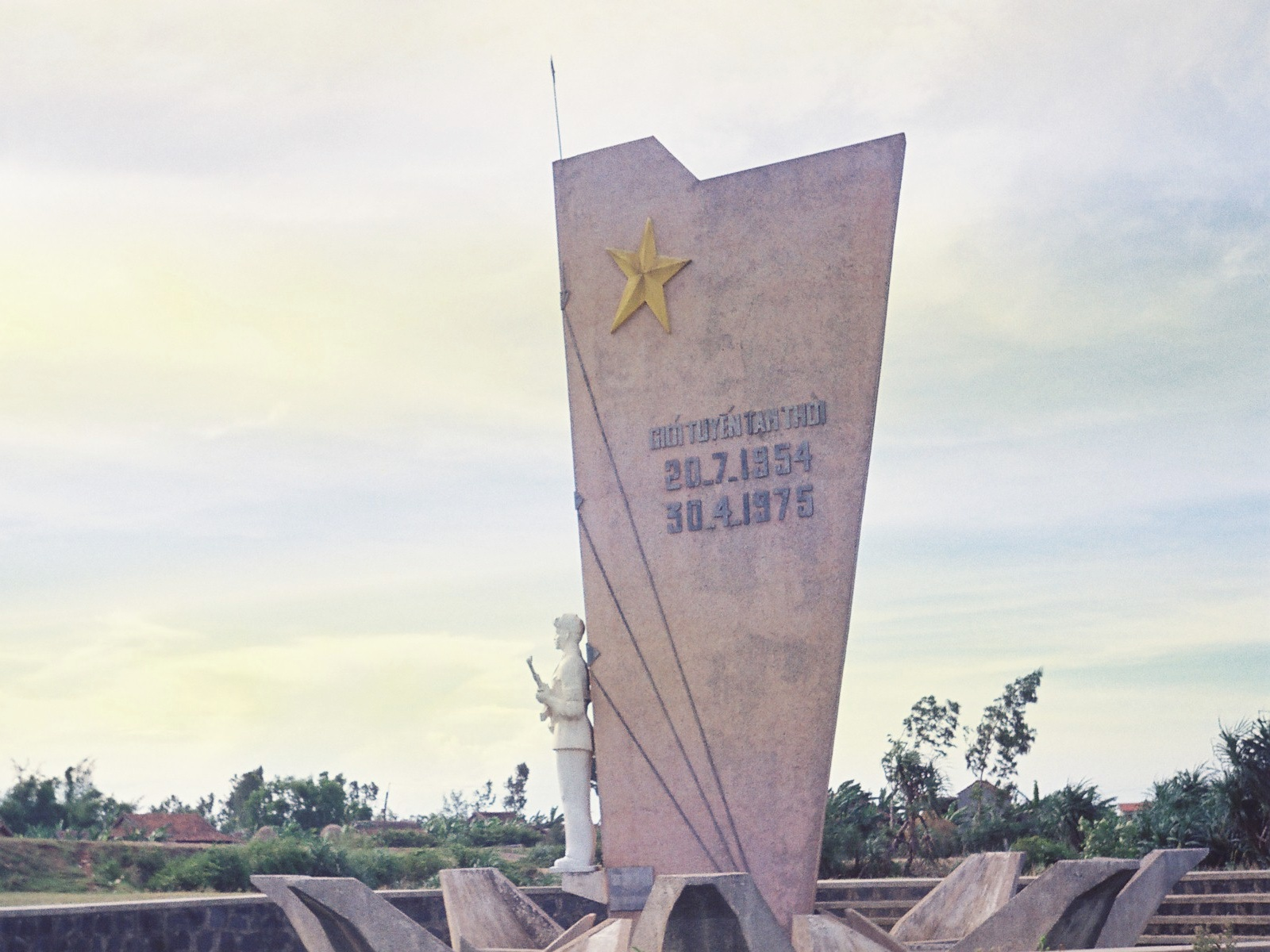
Monument to the DMZ

== See also ==
- 1st Searchlight Battery (United States)
- Clear Path International - an American NGO assisting victims of bombs and landmines left over from the Vietnam War in Central Vietnam
- Demilitarized zone
- Hiền Lương Bridge
- Korean Demilitarized Zone
- McNamara Line
- Inner German border and Berlin Wall
