= Chowan University =

Christian university in Murfreesboro, North Carolina, US

Coordinates: 36.435313°N 77.0981743°W

- Former names: Chowan Baptist Female Institute (1848–1850); Chowan Female Collegiate Institute (1850–1867); Chowan Baptist Female Institute (1867–1910); Chowan College (1910–2006)
- Motto: Lux et Veritas
- Motto in English: Light and Truth
- Type: Private university
- Established: 1848; 178 years ago
- Religious affiliation: Baptist State Convention of North Carolina (former)
- President: Rosemary M. Thomas
- Provost: John J. Dilustro
- Students: 886 (fall 2022)
- Undergraduates: 800
- Postgraduates: 86
- Location: Murfreesboro, North Carolina, U.S.
- Campus: Rural
- Colors: Blue and white
- Nickname: Hawks
- Sporting affiliations: NCAA Division II – Carolinas; NCCAA
- Mascot: Murf the Hawk
- Website: chowan.edu
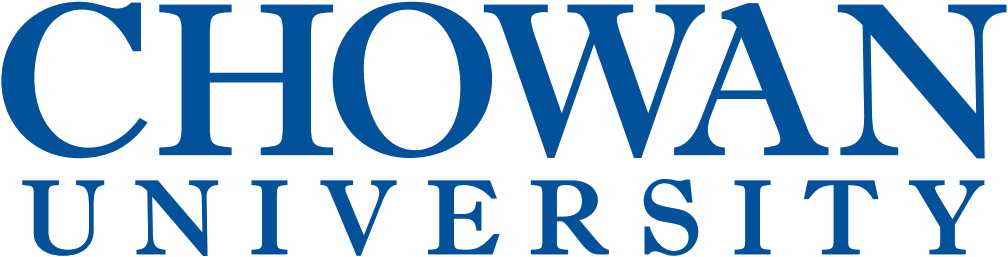

Chowan University (/tʃoʊˈwɒn/) is a private Christian university in Murfreesboro, North Carolina, United States. The university offers associate, bachelor's, and master's degrees in 70 academic disciplines and is accredited by the Southern Association of Colleges and Schools.

== History ==
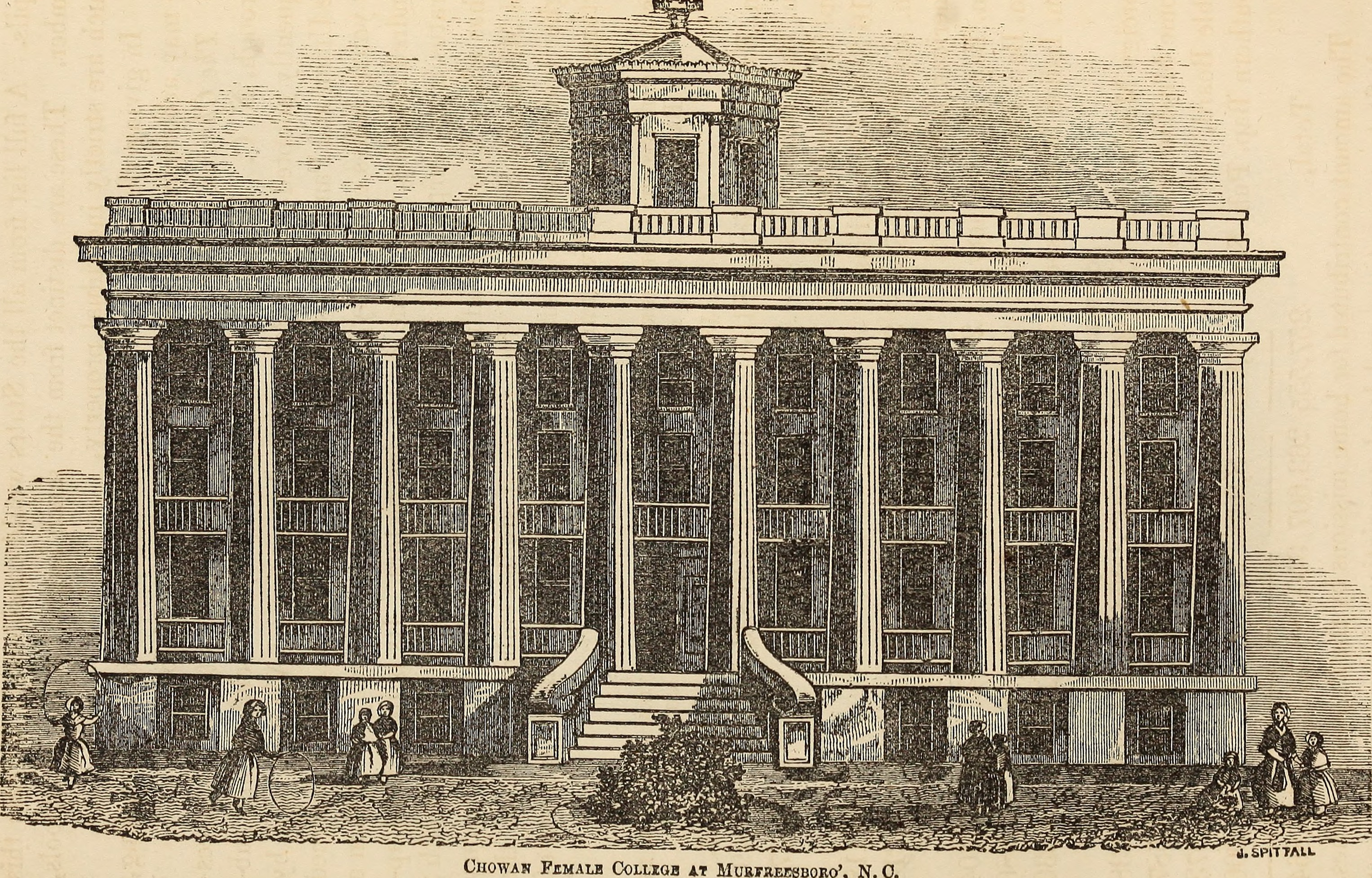
Chowan Female College, 1854

Chowan was founded by Godwin Cotton Moore in 1848 as Chowan Baptist Female Institute, a four-year women's college. It traces its roots to the Hertford Academy. The McDowell Columns building, which houses the administrative offices of the college, was constructed in 1851. Between 1850 and 1867, the school changed names to the Chowan Female Collegiate Institute, then switched back to the Chowan Baptist Female Institute. The school takes its name from the Chowanoke tribe of indigenous people who previously inhabited the land on which Murfreesboro and Chowan University stand.

The school was renamed Chowan College in 1910 when it began awarding baccalaureate degrees, and began admitting male students in 1931. Financial strain from the effects of the Great Depression forced the school to become a two-year institution in 1937.

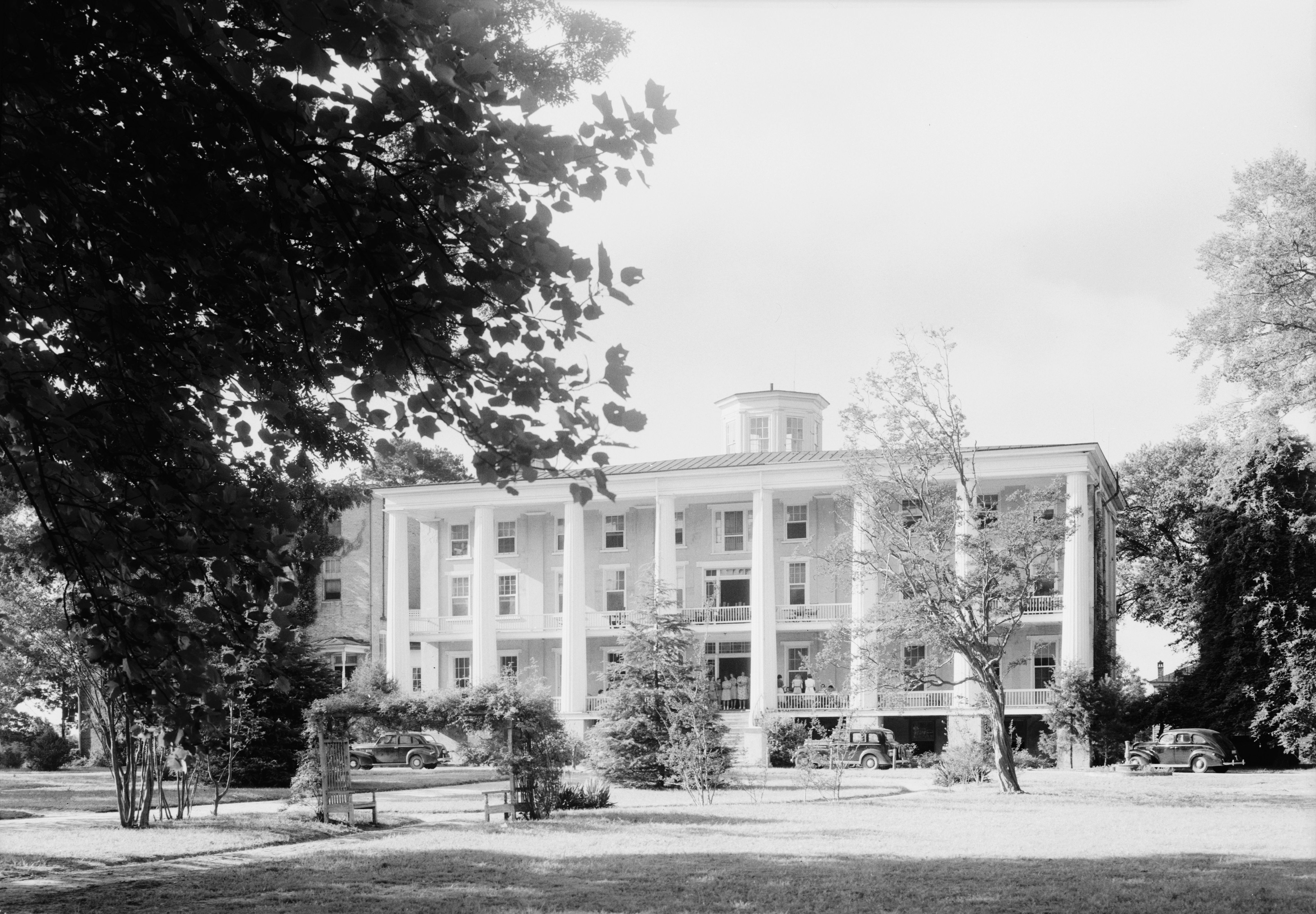
Chowan College in 1940

In 1992, the college returned to four-year status when it admitted a junior class. The college's board of trustees elected to officially change the name to Chowan University on April 6, 2006, and the change in status took place on September 1, 2006.

In 2007, Chowan University, along with four other private North Carolina Christian universities (Mars Hill University, Campbell University, Wingate University, and Gardner-Webb University), began a process to change their relationships with the Baptist State Convention of North Carolina, to obtain more academic freedom and select their own trustees. The state convention also agreed to start transferring funds traditionally given directly to the universities into a new scholarship fund for Baptist students. Two years later, the universities gained autonomy from the Baptist State Convention of North Carolina and established a "good faith and cooperative" relationship with it.

In December 2023, Rosemary M. Thomas was named as its 24th president and the first woman to serve in the role. She took office on March 11, 2024.

== Accreditation ==
Chowan University is accredited by the Southern Association of Colleges and Schools Commission on Colleges to award associate, baccalaureate, and masters degrees, along with other programs accredited by discipline-specific accreditors and approved by state agencies.

== Athletics ==
Chowan changed affiliation to the National Collegiate Athletic Association's (NCAA) Division II, primary competing in Conference Carolinas, and was formerly also a member of the National Christian College Athletic Association. Chowan previously competed in the USA South Athletic Conference of the National Collegiate Athletic Association's Division III and the Central Intercollegiate Athletic Association of the National Collegiate Athletic Association's Division II. The school's original mascot, adopted in the 1940s, was the Braves but was changed in 2006 to the Hawks due to NCAA policy on Native American mascots.

Chowan University has the following athletic teams: Women's Soccer, Men's Soccer, Football, Volleyball, Men's and Women's Cross Country, Men's Basketball, Women's Basketball, Softball, Baseball, Men's and Women's Golf, Men's and Women's Tennis, Men's and Women's Lacrosse, Women's Bowling, Women's Acrobatic and Tumbling, Men's and Women's Swimming, co-ed Esports and Cheerleading.

== Notable alumni ==
- Fred Banks, professional football player
- Robert Brown, professional football player
- David Green, professional football player
- Jerry Holmes, professional football player
- Howard Jacque Hunter III, politician
- Jude McAtamney, professional football player
- Khalid Sheikh Mohammed, confessed planner of the September 11 attacks (did not graduate)
- George Koonce, professional football player
- Nate McMillan, professional basketball player and coach
- Lucy Henderson Owen Robertson, academic and the first woman president of a college in the Southern United States
- Mark Royals, professional football player
- Jody Schulz, professional football player
- Curtis Whitley, professional football player
- Chandler Hallow, Youtuber
