= Operation Utah Mesa =

Part of the Vietnam War (1969)

- Part of the Vietnam War
Date	12 June – 6 July 1969
Location	northwest Quảng Trị Province, South Vietnam
Result	Allies claim operational success

Belligerents
United States	North Vietnam

Commanders and leaders
MG William K. Jones; Col. Edward F. Danowitz	

Units involved
(United States) 1st Battalion, 9th Marines; 2nd Battalion, 9th Marines; 3rd Battalion, 9th Marines; Companies B and C, 1st Battalion, 61st Infantry Regiment (Mechanized); Company B 1st Battalion, 77th Armored Regiment (South Vietnam) 2nd Regiment	24th Regiment

Casualties and losses
(United States) 14 killed	US body count: 309 killed

Operation Utah Mesa was a United States Marine Corps, United States Army and Army of the Republic of Vietnam (ARVN) operation in northwest Quảng Trị Province, South Vietnam from 12 June to 6 July 1969.

== Background ==
In late May, intelligence gained during Operation Cameron Falls and from sensor and reconnaissance reports indicated that the People's Army of Vietnam (PAVN) 24th Regiment of the 304th Division had infiltrated Quảng Trị Province near the Khe Sanh plateau. Task Force Hotel which was responsible for this area of Quảng Trị Province ordered the formation of Joint Task Force Guadalcanal, comprising 1st Battalion, 9th Marines, and Task Force Mustang, comprising Companies B and C, 1st Battalion, 61st Infantry Regiment (Mechanized) and Company B 1st Battalion, 77th Armored Regiment of the 1st Brigade, 5th Infantry Division (Mechanized) operating with the ARVN 2nd Regiment to sweep the area.

== Operation ==
The operation began on 12 June with the 1/9 Marines landed by helicopter at Landing Zone Bison (16.695°N 106.8175°E) and Hill 950, while the ARVN 3rd Battalion, 2nd Regiment was landed at Firebase Quantico (16.661°N 106.756°E); both battalions were to sweep west towards Khe Sanh. On 13 June the ARVN 2nd Battalion, 2nd Regiment was landed at Landing Zone Cokawa, north of Hill 950. On 15 June Company D 1/9 Marines was landed at Landing Zone Horn (16.639°N 106.777°E) to secure the advance of Task Force Mustang west along Route 9 towards Khe Sanh.

At 03:35 on 18 June over 100 soldiers from the PAVN 24th Regiment attacked Company B 1/61st Infantry's night defensive position east of Lang Vei penetrating the perimeter. When they withdrew at dawn the PAVN left behind 41 dead while U.S. losses were 11 dead. Later that day a reconnaissance patrol from Company C 1/9 Marines patrolling 3 km southeast of Khe Sanh was ambushed by entrenched PAVN with three Marines killed by machine gun fire, the ambushed platoon was recovered by the rest of Company C and they overran the PAVN position.

On 20 June the PAVN launched 3 separate attacks against a Company B, 1/61st Infantry and Company D, 1/9 Marines position. The attacks were repulsed with air and artillery support resulting in 27 PAVN killed.

On 22 June 1/9 Marines was replaced by 3rd Battalion, 9th Marines.

At 01:30 on 24 June 2 PAVN platoons attacked Company K, 3/9 Marines' night ambush position south of Route 9, the Marines retreated to the main Company position which then came under attack in an attack which last until dawn. On the night of 26 June Company K, 3/9th Marines' night defensive position was attacked again by an estimated two companies of PAVN, which was repulsed within yhree hours. PAVN losses in both attacks were 41 dead. On the night of 27 June 2 PAVN companies attacked Company I, 3/9 Marines position east of Lang Vei, losing 22 killed.

On 2 July 2nd Battalion, 9th Marines reopened Firebase Spark (16.488°N 106.756°E), 14 km south of Khe Sanh. The PAVN soon began shelling the base; 2/9 Marines patrolled the surrounding area forcing the PAVN to withdraw.

== Aftermath ==
On 6 July the 2/9 Marines and 3/9 Marines returned to Vandegrift Combat Base in preparation for the 9th Marine Regiment's redeployment from South Vietnam ending Operation Utah Mesa. U.S claimed the PAVN losses were 309 killed.
