= Anti-Terrorism Battalion =

Anti-Terrorism Battalion (AT BN)
- Active: 2004–2007 (USMC); 2007–2013 (USMCR)
- Country: United States of America
- Branch: United States Marine Corps
- Type: Specialized Infantry
- Size: 1,000
- Garrison/HQ: Marine Corps Base Camp Lejeune
- Motto: Vigilia Aeternus (Eternal Vigilance)
- Engagements: Iraq War; Combined Joint Task Force - Horn of Africa

The United States Marine Corps' Anti-Terrorism Battalion (AT BN) was a specialized infantry battalion. The battalion was disbanded in 2013.

== Mission ==
In response to the 9-11 attacks, the mission of the Anti-Terrorism Battalion was to rapidly deploy specially trained advanced infantry, intelligence personnel, support elements, and sustainable forces to detect, deter, defend, and conduct initial incident response to combat the threat of terrorism worldwide.

== Rotational Duty ==
After September 11, 2001, the Marine Corps began rotating standard infantry battalions such as 3rd Battalion 8th Marines (3/8) through 6-month on-call assignments as the designated "Anti-Terrorism Battalion" to meet short term/no-notice mission requirements. Examples included augmenting security at the American Embassy in Kabul, Afghanistan, with a rifle company for site security. These rotations required company and smaller size detachments but removed the entire force of the 1,000-man infantry battalion from the main war fighting effort. This posed a problem for the Marine Corps as Operations Enduring Freedom (OEF) and Iraqi Freedom (OIF) began to require additional full strength infantry battalions to rotate in and out of theater at a higher rate.

== USMC AT BN Activation ==
The permanent AT Battalion (AT BN) was activated 29 October 2004 under the 4th Marine Expeditionary Brigade (Anti Terrorism) (4th MEB (AT)). The 4th MEB (AT) was deactivated in February 2006, on the same day Marine Corps Forces Special Operations Command stood up, and the AT BN was administratively transferred initially to the II Marine Expeditionary Force (II MEF), and then finally to the 2d Marine Division by March 2006. The Foreign Military Training Unit (FMTU) along with 4th MEB (AT BN) headquarters element were absorbed into Marine Corps Special Operations Command (MarSoc).

The Active duty component of AT BN consisted of;

- Headquarters and Service Company (which included a Counter-Intelligence (CI) Human Exploitation Team (HET) permanently assigned to the battalion.)
- Alpha Company
- Bravo Company
- Charlie Company
- Delta Company
- Support Company (which acted as a Weapons Company, made up of a machine gun platoon, sniper section, and section of engineers). This was the premise for 3 CAAT sections and eventually evolved into Mobile Assault Platoons.

The Reserve component consisted of:

- Echo Company
- Fox Company
- India Company
- Kilo Company
- Lima Company

== Iraq & Horn of Africa ==
Between 2004 and 2007, the AT Battalion had served in western Al Anbar, central Baghdad and northern Diyala provinces of Iraq. Deployments included:

- A detachment of 30+ Marine Officers and SNCO's fulfilled the Border Transition Team's (BTT) mission on the Syrian border for a year over 2005–2006.
- The Personal Security Detachment (PSD) for the II MEF Commanding General. Rotations were 1 year each in 2005–2006 and 2007–2008 at Camp Fallujah.
- A Combined Anti-Armor Team (CAAT) platoon (CAAT III) deployed in support of the II Marine Expeditionary Force Headquarters Group as a motorized heavy machine gun platoon based out of Camp Fallujah in Al-Anbar province from October 2005 – March 2006. While there the platoon conducted convoy escort, route clearance, QRF, and other short term/no notice missions.
- Combined Anti-Armor Team (CAAT) platoons (CAAT I, II) deployed in support of OIF to FOB Spartan (later FOB Grizzly) located adjacent and within Camp Ashraf, Ashraf city, Diyala Province Iraq October 2005 – May 2006 and worked with various U.S. Army units.
- The Personal Security Detachment (PSD) for Regimental Combat Teams (RCT) 2 and 6 Commanders. Each team deployed for a year over 2007–2008.
- Four rotations to the American Embassy in Baghdad (initially company size, later reduced to platoon sized.) A Co, D Co, two separate platoons from B Co rotated on seven-month deployments from 2005 to 2007.
- Three company size rotations (B Co 2005 (Reinforced by CAAT I, II teams), A Co 2006–2007, and B Co 2007) to Camp Ashraf / Forward Operating Base Grizzly in Diyala Province in support of US Army 18th MP Brigade and US Army 43rd MP Brigade. A Co 1st Bn 9th Marines (2005–2006) and a Task Force from the Marine Corps National Capital Region (TF NCR 2007–2008) also deployed to Ashraf.
- The PSD requirement for the Combined Joint Task Force – Horn of Africa (CJTF-HOA) was supported by a squad size element from the ATBN in 2005–2006.

Numerous Marines also augmented other requirements for National Police Training Teams (NPTT), Military Transition Teams (MiTTs), and MEF augmentation requests to other infantry units.

Most Marines in the battalion completed two to three consecutive combat deployments in a single three-year tour of duty with the battalion as part of their initial 4-year enlistment contract.

== USMC AT BN Deactivation ==
On 13 July 2007, the active duty AT BN stood down in name and was reflagged as the 2nd Battalion 9th Marines as part of the increase in the size of the Marine Corps.

== USMCR AT BN Activation ==
In 2007 the Marine Corps Reserve reactivated the AT BN to meet similar mission requirements for the 4th Marine Division that the active duty battalion had met.

== Iraq Deployment ==
From Summer 2007 to Spring 2008, E Co AT BN 4th MARDIV deployed to combat operations, augmenting TFMP 1/10 and II MEF in Ramadi, Iraq and Fallujah, Iraq.

== Yemen ==
Fox Company AT BN 4th MARDIV augmented the US Embassy security and Anti-Terrorism operations in Sana'a Yemen 2011–2012.

== USMCR AT BN Deactivation ==
On 21 September 2013, the USMCR AT BN was officially deactivated.

== See also ==
- List of United States Marine Corps battalions
