= Frank J. Breth =

United States Marine Corps general (1937–2003)

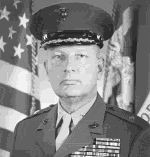
- Born: October 12, 1937; Fairmont, West Virginia, U.S.
- Died: December 6, 2003 (aged 66); Fairfax, Virginia, U.S.
- Military career
- Allegiance: United States of America
- Branch: United States Marine Corps
- Service years: 1959–1989
- Rank: Brigadier general
- Commands: 2nd Battalion, 1st Marines; Director of Intelligence, HQMC
- Awards: Legion of Merit (3); Bronze Star (3); Purple Heart (2)

Frank J. Breth (October 12, 1937 – December 6, 2003) was a United States Marine Corps brigadier general who was the commanding general, Marine Corps Recruit Depot and the Western Recruiting Region, San Diego, California.

== Early years ==
Frank Breth was born in Fairmont, West Virginia. He graduated from Shades Valley High School in Homewood, Alabama, and the Virginia Military Institute, Lexington, Virginia, where he earned his B.S. degree in chemistry. He also earned a M.A. in personnel administration from George Washington University.

== Marine Corps career ==
He was commissioned in 1959, following the completion of the platoon Leaders Class Program. Upon completion of The Basic School at Quantico, Virginia in March 1960, he assigned as a platoon commander in the 2nd Battalion, 7th Marines, which transplaced to the Western Pacific as the 2nd Battalion, 9th Marines. While overseas, he was promoted to first lieutenant in December 1960. Returning from overseas in 1961, he reported to the 2nd Marine Division, Camp Lejeune, North Carolina for duty as weapons platoon commander, 81mm mortar platoon commander, company executive officer and company commander in the 1st Battalion, 6th Marines. In 1963, he was assigned as executive officer of the Marine Detachment, aboard Galveston in the Western Pacific.

Promoted to captain in February 1964, he reported to The Basic School and served as a company officer, leadership instructor, and tactics instructor. Subsequently, Breth attended the Canadian Army Staff College, Kingston, Ontario, where he was recognized as a Distinguished Graduate. Upon completion of his studies in August 1967, he was assigned to the 3rd Marine Division in the I Corps sector of the Republic of Vietnam, where he served with the 3rd Battalion, 9th Marines as a rifle company commander and operations officer. During the tour he also served as the 3rd Marine Division liaison officer to the 1st ARVN Division in Huế. He was promoted to major in November 1967.

Breth returned to the United States in September 1968, and was assigned to Marine Barracks, Washington, D.C., where he served as Guard Company Commander and executive officer, Marine Corps Institute. During April 1972, he reported to Headquarters Marine Corps, Washington, D.C., as Head Special Officer Programs Section, Personnel Procurement Branch in the Manpower Department. Upon completion of the Marine Corps Staff and Command College at Quantico in June 1975, Breth was assigned to the Commander, Naval Forces Korea, as the liaison officer to the 1st Marine Division, Republic of Korea Marine Corps in Pohang, Korea. He was promoted to lieutenant colonel in September 1975.

In July 1976, Breth assumed command of the 2nd Battalion, 1st Marines, 1st Marine Division, Camp Pendleton, California, and later, served as assistant chief of staff, G-1. He subsequently attended the United States Army War College, Carlisle Barracks, Pennsylvania, graduating in June 1979. He then returned to Korea to serve as Chief, Contingency Plans Branch(C-5), of the newly formed ROK-US Combined Forces Command, Seoul, Korea.

Promoted to colonel in May 1981, he returned to the United States the following month for duties as the deputy director, 9th Marine Corps District, Kansas City, Kansas. In August 1982, he assumed command of the 9th Marine Corps District. He returned to Camp Pendleton in July, for duty as the assistant chief for staff, G-3, I Marine Amphibious Force. In June 1985, he was promoted to brigadier general and assumed the duty as the director of Intelligence, Headquarters Marine Corps. In January 1988, he was assigned as director of the C412 Department/Director of Marine Corps Intelligence, Headquarters Marine Corps. He assumed the duties of commanding general, MCRD/WRR, San Diego in September 1988, and completed military service and retired in September 1989.

General Breth died of cancer on December 6, 2003, and is buried at Arlington National Cemetery.

== Bibliography ==
Online resources

- "Brigadier General Frank J. Breth – Deceased". United States Marine Corps. 20 August 2004. Archived from the original on 20 August 2007.
