= Rosemary M. Thomas =

American academic administrator

24th President of Chowan University
- Incumbent
- Assumed office March 11, 2024
- Preceded by: Charles Taylor (interim)

Personal details
- Education: Clemson University; University of South Carolina; West Virginia University

Rosemary M. Thomas is an American academic administrator serving as the twenty-fourth president of Chowan University since 2024. She was the executive vice president of Davis & Elkins College.

== Life ==
Thomas is from Fairmont, West Virginia. She earned a B.A. in political science and communications from Clemson University in 1990. She completed a M.P.A. at the University of South Carolina. She earned a D.Ed. in educational leadership at West Virginia University. She completed postdoctoral work at Harvard University.

In 2017, Thomas joined Davis & Elkins College as its vice president of enrollment management and institutional advancement. During this time, she implemented a campus retention initiative and participated in its $100 million fundraiser. She was promoted to executive vice president where she managed enrollment, marketing and communications, and also served as the acting director of athletics. She is the president of the Elkins General Federation of Women's Club, director of the American Legion Auxiliary West Virginia Rhododendron Girls State, and president of the Community of Care of West Virginia, Inc. board of directors. In December 2023, she was named as the incoming twenty-fourth president of Chowan University. She began on March 11, 2024. She is its first female president.
