= 2nd Battalion, 9th Marines =

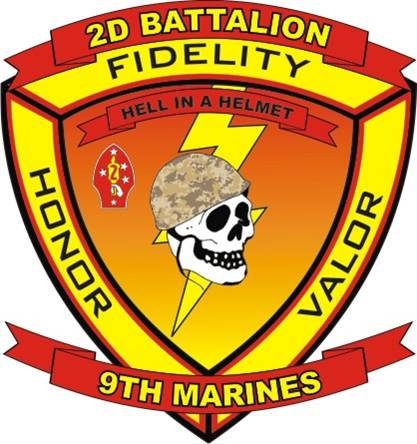
- 2nd Battalion, 9th Marine Regiment insignia
- Active: November 20, 1917 – September 2, 1994; July 13, 2007 – April 1, 2015
- Country: United States
- Branch: United States Marine Corps
- Type: Marines
- Role: Amphibious warfare Close-quarters combat Jungle warfare Raiding; Reconnaissance; Urban warfare
- Size: Battalion
- Nickname: "Hell in a Helmet"
- Engagements: World War II; Battle of Bougainville; Battle of Guam; Battle of Iwo Jima; Vietnam War; Battle of Hill 881; Operation Kingfisher; Battle of Khe Sanh; Operation Frequent Wind; Mayaguez Incident; Persian Gulf War; Operation Desert Storm; Somali Civil War; Operation Restore Hope; Iraq War; War in Afghanistan

2nd Battalion, 9th Marines (2/9) was an infantry battalion of the United States Marine Corps. Formed during World War I, the unit played an instrumental role in the defeat of the Japanese forces in the Battles of Guam and Iwo Jima during World War II. The battalion distinguished itself in the defense of Khe Sanh during the Vietnam War, and later participated in an ill-fated invasion of Koh Tang Island in Southeast Asia, with the intention of rescuing the crew of SS Mayaguez. During Operation Desert Storm, the battalion served as the lead battalion for the III Marine Expeditionary Force (III MEF).

2/9 also participated in various humanitarian missions. The battalion helped evacuate Americans from Northern China during the Chinese Civil War and in various occasions participated in providing relief to the victims of typhoons. In 1992, the battalion participated in Operation Restore Hope in Somalia.

2nd Battalion 9th Marines served until September 2, 1994, when it was deactivated to make room for one of three light armor reconnaissance battalions. It was part of the 9th Marine Regiment and the 3rd Marine Division. On July 13, 2007, 2nd Battalion 9th Marines was re-activated again as part of the 6th Marine Regiment and replaced the Anti-Terrorism Battalion (ATBN). On April 1, 2015, it was deactivated as part of a post-war drawdown from Afghanistan.

== Battalion composition ==
A battalion in the Marine Corps is headed by the battalion commander, usually a lieutenant colonel and sometimes a colonel, his staff, headquarters, and the battalion sergeant major. It usually consists of 3–5 companies, with a total of 300 to 1,200 marines. 2nd Battalion 9th Marines comprises a headquarters & service (H&S) company, weapons company and three infantry companies: Echo, Fox, and Golf. During the Vietnam war the battalion comprised headquarters & service (H&S) company, and four infantry companies: Echo, Fox, Golf, and Hotel. Each company had its own weapons platoon with 3 squads of M60 machine guns (7.62) and 60 mm mortars and ether 3.5-inch rocket launchers (super bazooka) or later LAAWS.

== History ==
=== Early years ===
With the advent of World War I, the United States expanded the armed forces, to include the United States Marine Corps. The 2nd Battalion, 9th Marines (also known as 2/9) was created and activated on November 20, 1917, at Quantico, Virginia. During this period, there was turmoil in Cuba's sugar producing regions. American companies operated the island's sugar industry, which was vital to the economy of the United States. The battalion's first mission was to keep order in the island and once this was accomplished, it was reassigned. There were rumors that German agents were going to disrupt Mexican oil shipments to Texas. The battalion was sent to Texas to safeguard these shipments. 2/9 was disbanded after the war on April 25, 1919, only to be reactivated in 1925. The battalion's main objective was to train reserve Marines and its headquarters was now transferred to Kansas City, Missouri, with two companies stationed at St. Louis. 2/9 was once again disbanded in 1937.

=== World War II ===
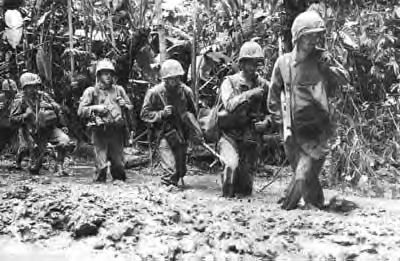
Marines trudge forward through calf–deep mud on the Numa Numa Trail, Bougainville—November 1943

In April 1942, five months after the Japanese attack on Pearl Harbor, the unit was activated as part of the 2nd Marine Division. The headquarters was at Camp Elliot in San Diego, California, where it underwent intensive amphibious training. Before being reassigned to the 3rd Marine Division, the unit was assigned to Amphibious Corps, Pacific Fleet. The regiment was sent to Guadalcanal in July 1943 to relieve the 1st Marine Division. 2nd Battalion, 9th Marines participated in the Bougainville campaign of the Solomon Islands in the latter part of 1943. On July 21, 1944, 2/9 participated in the invasion of Guam. The Japanese forces staged seven counterattacks, however the Marines prevailed despite the fact that they suffered over 50% casualties. It was during this initial battle that one Marine, Captain Louis H. Wilson Jr., (who would in the future become a Commandant of the Marine Corps) earned the Medal of Honor.

The 2nd Battalion, 9th Marines were part of the reserve forces for the Battle of Iwo Jima and were committed to the action five days after D-Day. Among the Marines who distinguished themselves on Iwo Jima was Private Wilson D. Watson who received the Medal of Honor. After the island was secured, the unit was sent back to Guam where they underwent training for a possible invasion of the Japanese mainland. The invasion never occurred since hostilities between Japan and the United States came to an end. The 2nd Battalion, 9th Marines was sent to Camp Pendelton where, in December 1945, it was once again disbanded.

=== Post-World War II ===
In November 1948, 2nd Battalion, 9th Marines was again reestablished. The final stages of fighting between the Nationalists and the Chinese Communist Party in the Chinese Civil War occurred between 1945 and 1950. When the fighting escalated, the 2nd Battalion, 9th Marines were ordered to Northern China to evacuate all Americans. This mission was accomplished by March 1949 and after which the battalion was sent to Camp Lejeune, North Carolina and was renamed as the 3rd Battalion, 6th Marine.

On June 25, 1950, war broke out between the provisional governments of North and South Korea as they competed for control over the Korean Peninsula. North Korea was supported by the People's Volunteer Army (PVA) of the People's Republic of China and South Korea by the allies under the aegis of the United Nations which included the United States. The conflict is known as the Korean War. The 1st Marine Division was sent in and saw action in the Battle of Chosin Reservoir. In 1952, 2nd Battalion, 9th Marines was reactivated and underwent training in Japan with the intention of participating in the conflict as part of the 3rd Marine Division. However an armistice was signed on July 27, 1953, and the unit did not deploy to Korea. Even though 2nd Battalion, 9th Marines did not actively participate in the conflict, the unit was awarded the Korean Service Streamer and National Defense Service Medal Streamer. The 3rd Marine Divisions headquarters was moved to Okinawa in 1955 and in 1959 the 2nd Battalion, 9th Marines returned to the 1st Marine Division. In 1960, the battalion returned to the 3rd Marine Division in Okinawa.

=== Vietnam War ===
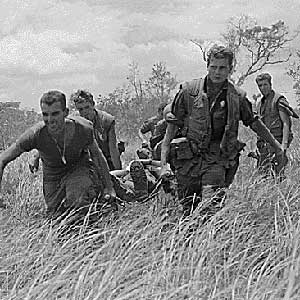
Marines of E/2/9 carry a wounded Marine to a MEDEVAC helicopter during Operation Hickory III

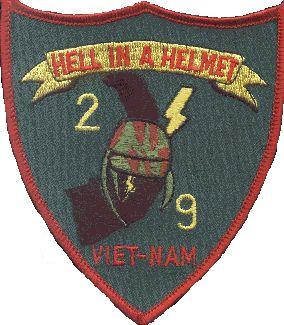
2/9 insignia from the Vietnam-era.

The Vietnam War, was a conflict between the Democratic Republic of Vietnam (DRVN, DRV or North Vietnam) and the Republic of Vietnam (RVN or South Vietnam), which eventually involved their respective allies. In 1959, the United States sent military advisors to train the Army of the Republic of Vietnam (ARVN). By 1965, there were 25,000 military advisors in South Vietnam and on March 8, 1965, the United States Marines became the first US combat troops to land in South Vietnam, with a force of 3,500.

The 3d Marine Division began operating in Vietnam when on May 6, 1965, they opened a Marine Compound at the Da Nang Air Base. On July 4, 1965, 2nd Battalion, 9th Marines were ordered to Vietnam from Okinawa. 2nd Battalion, 9th Marines fought battles in or around Danang, Hue, Phu Bai, Đông Hà, Camp Carroll, Cam Lộ, Con Thien, Than Cam Son, Quảng Trị, Cửa Việt, Vandegrift Combat Base and what is considered by many as their most vicious engagement, the Battle of Khe Sanh.

In September 1962, U.S. military forces constructed an airstrip outside the town of Khe Sanh which became known as the Khe Sanh Combat Base. In 1965 the U.S. Special Forces constructed a base next to it. The base's defense was codenamed Operation Scotland and manned by the 2nd Battalion, 9th Marines from 1967. It was used as a staging ground for a number of attacks on People's Army of Vietnam (PAVN) troop movements down the Ho Chi Minh Trail.

From April to June 1966, the 2/9 Marines were caught in crossfire of the Buddhist Uprising, when much of the forces of I Corps rebelled against Prime Minister and Air Marshal Nguyen Cao Ky, the head of the ruling junta, who had dismissed their commander, General Nguyen Chanh Thi.

In April and May 1967 The Hill Fights on Hills 861, 881 North and 881 South around Khe Sanh Combat Base between the 2/9 Marines and PAVN occurred. In January 1968, Khe Sanh came under heavy attack in what is known as the Battle of Khe Sanh. The main objective of the PAVN was to draw off American troops into the countryside in preparation for the Tet Offensive. Despite being outnumbered, 2/9 Marines, the 26th Marine Regiment and ARVN forces held their ground and the PAVN were driven off of the area around after experiencing heavy casualties by heavy aerial bombardment.

From January 22 to March 18, 1969, 2/9 participated in Operation Dewey Canyon which was a sweep of the A Shau Valley and the last major offensive by the Marine Corps in Vietnam.

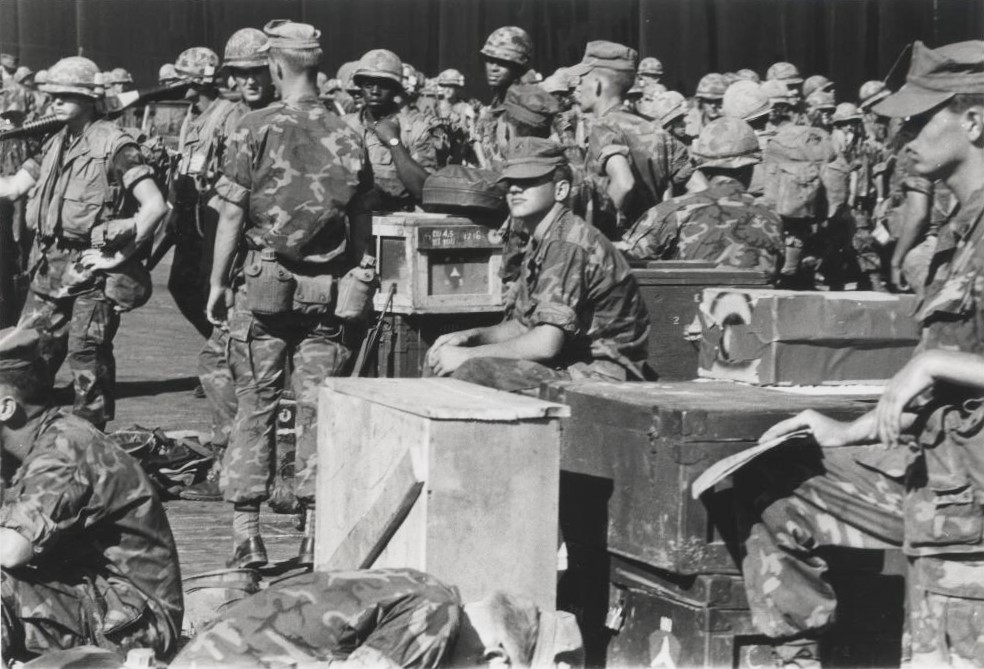
2/9 Marines wait to board USS Paul Revere

On August 1, 1969, 2/9 departed Vietnam onboard the USS Paul Revere bound for Camp Schwab, Okinawa. During its 49 months in combat the battalion participated in more than 20 major operations. During this period the unit was assigned to sea duty in and around the waters of Vietnam and continued to receive combat training at Camp Fuji, Japan and Subic Bay in the Philippines.

==== Mayaguez Incident ====
On May 12, 1975, barely two weeks after the fall of Saigon, Khmer Rouge forces seized a U.S. flagged merchant ship, the SS Mayaguez in recognized international sea lanes claimed as territorial waters by Cambodia and removed its crew for questioning. The Khmer Rouge naval forces used abandoned US Navy "Swift Boats" in the seizure of the U.S. container ship.

Calling the seizure "piracy", President Ford ordered a military response to retake the ship and its 39-man crew, mistakenly thought to be on Koh Tang Island. On May 13, two A-7D Corsairs saw the 39 man crew board a fishing boat and saw people disembarking fishing boats at Koh Tang Island. They assumed that the Mayaguez crew was on the island. Elements of the 1st Battalion, 4th Marines, the 2nd Battalion, 4th Marines, and the 2nd Battalion, 9th Marines, were flown to an advanced staging of a joint US Task Force. On May 14, the Marines from Company D, 1st Battalion, 4th Marines boarded the Mayaguez only to find it deserted and raised the American flag. A Thai fishing boat with a Thai crew and the 39 crew members of the SS Mayaguez which had been set free, approached the USS Wilson.

==== Battle of Koh Tang Island ====
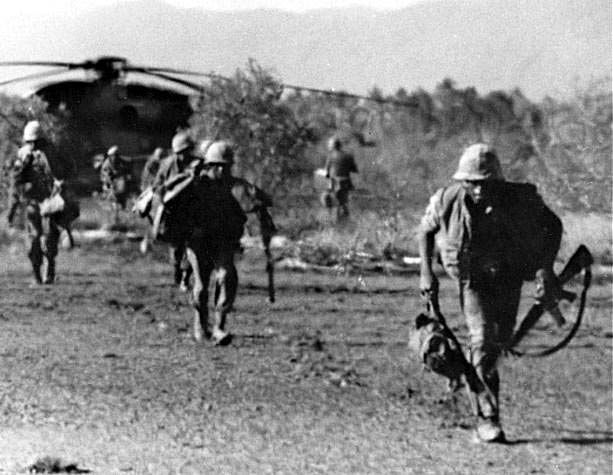
2nd Battalion, 9th Marines evacuate a damaged helicopter during the Mayaguez incident

2nd Battalion, 9th Marines landed on Koh Tang Island where the crew of the SS Mayaguez was believed to be held, they were unaware that the crew was already in American hands. The Marines and the CH-53 helicopters which transported them, were attacked by the Khmer Rouge with machine guns, mortars, and rocket propelled grenade launchers in what became known as the Battle of Koh Tang Island. When the battalion received word of the safe arrival of the Mayaguez crew on the USS Wilson the Marines planned their withdrawal once they received orders from the U.S. Joint Chiefs of Staff to that effect. After the last helicopter left, a head count showed that 3 Marines were left behind on the island. They were: PFC Gary Hall, LCpl. Joseph Hargrove, and Pvt Danny Marshall from E CO, 2nd Battalion, 9th Marines. The three Marines were captured by the Khmer Rouge within a few days, tortured and executed.

The Mayagüez incident with the Khmer Rouge, which ended on May 15, 1975, marked the last official battle of the 2nd Battalion, 9th Marines in the Vietnam War. The unit deployment program was put into practice in February 1979, and 2nd Battalion, 9th Marines became the first battalion to rotate to the United States. A total of 18 Marines were killed on the last day of the SS Mayaguez rescue operation. They are the last Marines listed on the timeline of the Vietnam Veterans Memorial located in Washington, D.C.

=== Post Vietnam era ===
==== Operations Desert Shield & Desert Storm ====
Before the August 2, 1990, invasion of Kuwait by Saddam Hussein's Iraqi forces, 2nd Battalion, 9th Marines was deployed to Okinawa, Japan as part of the Unit Deployment Program. In October 1990 the unit deployed to the Republic of the Philippines where it became the Ground Combat Element of Marine Air-Ground Task Force (MAGTF) 4-90. In November 1990, the island of Cebu, a Philippine providence, was devastated by a typhoon. Members of the battalion provided assistance during the disaster relief efforts. The battalion remained in the Philippines until April 1991 when it returned to Okinawa, Japan. Subsequently, the battalion returned to Camp Pendleton in August 1991.

2/9 never returned to Okinawa in 1991. This is incorrect. We went directly from Subic Bay, Philippines to Camp Pendleton, CA USA. We left the Philippines about 2 weeks before Mt Pinatubo erupted on JUN 12 1991. We may have stopped in Okinawa on the way home but were never there until August. We went back to San Mateo 62 Area, Camp Pendleton. We had barracks on the South East end, South of where the 62 Area BAS is now(2026). They were squad bays back then, one story. Not the nice multi level apartments currently there. A Marine, Fox CO 2/9.

This is not correct. 2/9 did return to Okinawa after their time at Subic Bay. The unit returned to Camp Schwab until August 91 and then was at San Mateo. A Marine H&S Company 2/9.

==== Somalia ====
The 5th Marine Regiment designated 2/9 to participate in the Marine Expeditionary Unit deployment cycle during November 1991. With the successful culmination of the Special Operations Capable Exercise (MEUSOC), 2nd Battalion, 9th Marines became the designated Battalion Landing Team (BLT) for the 15th Marine Expeditionary Unit (15th MEU).

By this time, Somalia had suffered over four years of civil war. Dictator Mohammed Siad Barre had deliberately broken up the armed forces into clan factions in order to maintain his hold on power, starting from 1987. By 1991 there were two dominant factions in the immediate area of Mogadishu, the capital. One of the factions was led by Ali Mahdi Mohamed; and the other, by the warlord Mohammed Farah Aidid.

In 1991, the United States initiated Operation Provide Relief (UNOSOM I) which was part of a UN endorsed effort called The Unified Task Force (UNITAF), to provide humanitarian relief. In August 1992, President George H. Bush sent, 25,000 US troops (mostly US Marines from I MEF) to the Republic of Somalia and the mission was renamed Operation Restore Hope, also known as UNOSOM II. Its main objectives were to provide humanitarian relief, initiate 'nation building', disarm the various factions, restore law and order, help the people set up a representative government, and restore the infrastructure.

That same month, 2nd Battalion, 9th Marines was deployed to Somalia. BLT 2/9's mission was to be the lead unit, Marine Raiders from Fox Company performing the first live rubber boat landing since WW2 secured the seaport and a force Recon unit followed by Gulf company secured the airfield in Mogadishu which allowed the rapid build-up of forces in-country. The mission was accomplished between December 9, 1992, and February 1993. The Somalis referred to Marines of 2nd Battalion, 9th Marines as "The Black Boots." On January 30, 1993, a Marine patrol was ambushed in Mogadishu by gunmen faithful to warlord Mohammed Farah Aidid bringing about casualties. 2/9 remained in Somalia until April 1993 when they returned to Camp Pendleton. The battalion's next two deployments were to Fort Sherman, Panama for jungle training and then Fort Hunter Liggett which they participated in the Javelin anti-tank missile evaluation program. On September 2, 1994, 2nd Battalion 9th Marines was deactivated and redesignated 2nd Battalion 4th Marines.

=== 2007-2015 ===
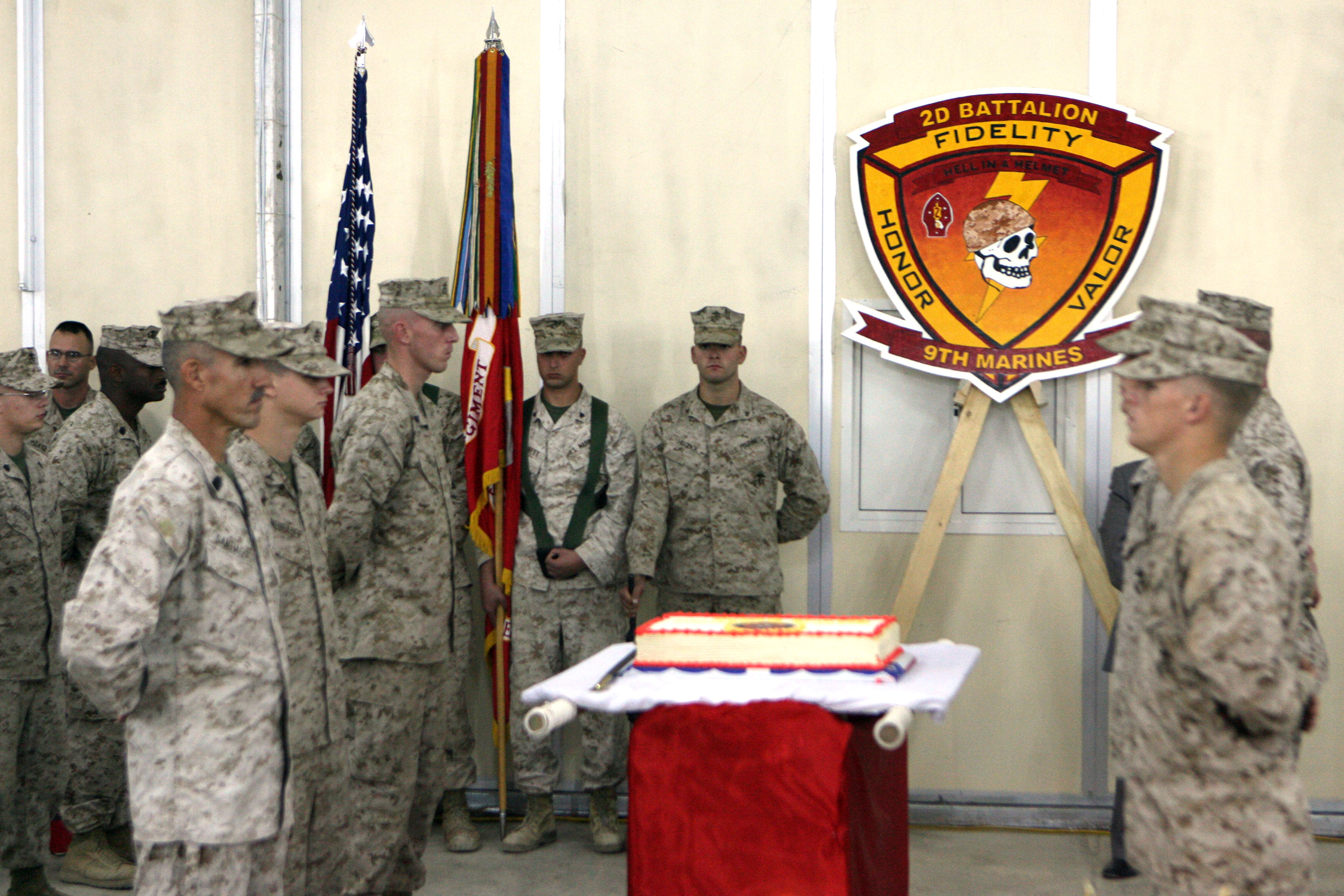
2/9 celebrates the Marine Corps birthday in Ramadi in 2008

On December 7, 2006, Headquarters Marine Corps released a message stating that 2nd Battalion 9th Marines would be reactivated during 2007 as part of the continuing Global War on Terror. 2nd Battalion 9th Marines was re-activated on July 13, 2007, and replaced the Anti-Terrorism Battalion (ATBn). In September 2008, Marines and Sailors from 2/9 deployed to Al Anbar Province in support of Operation Iraqi Freedom. They were based in the city of Ramadi and returned in April 2009 without any Marines or Sailors killed in action. July 2010 Marines and Sailors from 2/9 deployed to Marjah, Helmand Province, Afghanistan in support of Operation Enduring Freedom. In December 2010 Echo Company from 2/9 were attached to 3/5 in Sangin, Afghanistan where they earned the notorious nickname of "Green Hats." They returned February 2011. They redeployed back to Marjah December 2011 and returned July 2012. Echo and Weapons companies deployed once more to Afghanistan from January through April 2013, participating in combat operations out of Camp Leatherneck. On April 1, 2015, the battalion was deactivated in a ceremony at Camp Lejeune.

== Medal of Honor recipients ==
The Medal of Honor is the highest military decoration awarded by the United States. It is bestowed on a member of the United States armed forces who distinguishes himself or herself "... conspicuously by gallantry and intrepidity at the risk of his life above and beyond the call of duty while engaged in an action against an enemy of the United States ...". The following table contains the names of the men who were recipients of the Medal of Honor while serving in 2/9. They are listed in accordance to the "Date of Action" in which the MoH citation was made. † indicates that the Medal of Honor was awarded posthumously

Name	Rank in 2/9	Unit	Place	Date of action	Ref.
Louis H. Wilson Jr.	Captain	Company F, 2nd Battalion, 9th Marines, 3rd Marine Division	Near Font Hill, Guam	July 25, 1944 – July 26, 1944	
Wilson D. Watson	Private	Company G, 2nd Battalion, 9th Marines, 3rd Marine Division	Iwo Jima	February 26, 1945 – February 27, 1945	
Harvey C. Barnum, Jr.	First Lieutenant	Company H, 2nd Battalion, 9th Marines, 3rd Marine Division	Near Ky Phu, Republic of Vietnam	December 18, 1965	
Thomas P. Noonan, Jr. †	Lance Corporal	Company G, 2nd Battalion, 9th Marines, 3rd Marine	Near Quanq Tri Province, Republic of Vietnam	February 5, 1969	
William D. Morgan †	Corporal	Company H, 2nd Battalion, 9th Marines, 3rd Marine Division	Near Quanq Tri Province, Republic of Vietnam	February 25, 1969	
William K. Carpenter	Corporal	Company F, 2nd Battalion, 9th Marines, 1st Marine Division	Marjah, Helmand Province, Afghanistan	November 21, 2010	

== Commandants of the Marine Corps ==
The Commandant of the United States Marine Corps is the highest-ranking officer of the United States Marine Corps and a member of the Joint Chiefs of Staff, reporting to the Secretary of the Navy but not to the Chief of Naval Operations. Three Marines who served in 2nd Battalion 9th Marines became Commandant of the Marine Corps. They are listed in the table in accordance to the years in which they served as Commandants and their ranks are those which they held while serving in 2/9, they were:

Name	Rank in 2/9	Unit served	Served as Commandant	Ref.
Robert E. Cushman, Jr.	Lieutenant Colonel	Commanding officer of 2/9 from January 2, 1943, to April 20, 1945	January 1, 1972, to June 30, 1975	
Louis H. Wilson Jr.	Captain	Company F, 2nd Battalion, 9th Marines, 3rd Marine Division	July 1, 1975, to June 30, 1979	
Charles C. Krulak	Major	Operations Officer of 2/9 from 1977 to 1978	June 30, 1995, to June 30, 1999	

== Distinguished Marines ==
Other Marines who served in the 2nd Battalion 9th Marines during their careers, who subsequently distinguished themselves by either becoming a general officer (O-7 and above) or recipients of the Medal of Honor while assigned to a different unit were:

Name	Rank	Unit served	Distinction	Ref.
Frank J. Breth	Brigadier General	Platoon Commander (1960–1961)	Reached the rank of Brigadier General	
Joseph J. McMenamin	Brigadier General	Served as the 81mm Mortar Platoon Commander and Headquarters & Service Company Executive Officer (1974–1976)	Reached the rank of Brigadier General	
Howard V. Lee	Lieutenant Colonel	Platoon commander of Co. F, 2nd Battalion, 9th Marines, 3rd Marine Division (1958–1959)	Medal of Honor (1966)	
Allan J. Kellogg	Sergeant Major	Company Supply Non-commissioned Officer of Company F, 2nd Battalion, 9th Marines, 3rd Marine Division (1965–1967)	Medal of Honor (1970)	

== Other notable former members ==
- Francis J. "Bing" West, an American author and former Assistant Secretary of Defense for International Security Affairs during the Reagan Administration. He served in the mortar platoon during the Vietnam War in 1965.

== Unit awards ==
A unit citation or commendation is an award bestowed upon an organization for the action cited. Members of the unit who participated in said actions are allowed to wear on their uniforms the awarded unit citation. 2/9 has been presented with the following awards:

- Presidential Unit Citation (Navy/Marine Corps)
- Presidential Unit Citation (Army/Air Force)
- Navy Unit Commendation
- Meritorious Unit Commendation (Navy/Marine Corps)
- Asiatic-Pacific Campaign
- World War II Victory
- National Defense Service
- China Service
- Korean Service
- Armed Forces Expeditionary
- Southwest Asia Service
- Vietnam Service
- Republic of Vietnam Armed Forces Meritorious Unit Citation of the Gallantry Cross
- Philippine Presidential Unit Citation
- Fourragère - 2/9 under the 5th or 6th Marines command rates a French Fourragère

== See also ==
- History of the United States Marine Corps
- List of United States Marine Corps battalions
- Organization of the United States Marine Corps
