= List of allied military operations of the Vietnam War (1969) =

This article is a list of known military operations of the Vietnam War in 1969, conducted by the armed forces of the Republic of Vietnam, the United States and their allies.

Date Duration	Operation Name	Unit(s) – Description	Location	VC–PAVN KIA (US Sources)	Allied KIA(US Sources)
Jan 1 – Mar 31	Operation Skysweep	1st Battalion, 503rd Airborne Infantry Regiment clear and search operation			
Jan 1 – Aug 31	Operation Rice Farmer	9th Infantry Division and ARVN 5th Regiment operation	Dinh Tuong, Kien Tuong and Kien Hoa Provinces	1,860	
Jan 1 – Dec 31	Operation Quyet Thang II	ARVN 7th Division, 9th Division and 21st Division clear and search operations	IV Corps	37,874	
Jan 2	Operation Barrier Reef	Fourth and last interdiction barrier in the Mekong Delta established with naval patrols operating on the LaGrange-Ong Long Canal from, Tuyen Nhon on the Vam Co Tay River to An Long	Mekong Delta		
Jan 2 – 4	Operation Tiger Balm	1st Battalion, Royal Australian Regiment and 1st Australian Civil Affairs Unit cordon and search operation	Phước Tuy Province		
Jan 3 – 7	Operation Water Trap	Mobile Riverine Force 9th Infantry cordon and search operation	Thoi Son Island, Mỹ Tho River, south of Dong Tam Base Camp		
Jan 5 – 17	Operation Big Muddy	3rd Brigade, 25th Infantry Division operations	along the Saigon River		
Jan 10 – 18	Operation Treasure Island	2nd Squadron, 11th Armored Cavalry Regiment cordon and search operation	Bình Dương Province		
Jan 13 – Feb 9	Operation Bold Mariner (part of Operation Game Warden)	HMM-362, SLF-A, ARVN 2nd Division, 2/26th Marines, HMM-164 cordon, search, and sweep operation was the largest amphibious assault of the war	Batangan Peninsula, Quảng Ngãi Province	239	5
Jan 15 – 20	Operation Russell Beach	198th Infantry Brigade, 3rd Battalion, 26 Marines and ARVN joint operation to remove Vietnamese refugees from the area before pushing forward to root out VC troops and fortifications	Batangan Peninsula, Quảng Tín Province		
Jan 20 – 23	Operation Toan Thang 1/69	4th Battalion, Royal Australian Regiment/Royal New Zealand Infantry Regiment (ANZAC) reconnaissance operation in Phước Tuy Province			
Jan 22 – Feb 3	Operation Wheeler Place	2nd Brigade, 25th Infantry Division and ARVN 2nd Division operation	Bình Dương Province		
Jan 22 – Mar 18	Operation Dewey Canyon	1st Battalion, 9th Marines, 2nd Battalion, 9th Marines, 3rd Battalion, 9th Marines, 2nd Battalion, 3rd Marines and ARVN 2nd Regiment offensive against PAVN communication lines in Laos	north of the A Shau Valley in Thừa Thiên Province	1,667	130 USMC
Jan 24 – Feb 28	Operation Ohio Rapids	3rd Brigade, 101st Airborne Division and ARVN 1st Division reconnaissance in force operation	Thừa Thiên Province		
Jan 27	Operation Arlington	2nd Battalion, 1st Infantry Division search and destroy operation			
Jan 27 – Feb 7	Operation Linn River	1st Battalion, 7th Marines and 2nd Battalion, 26th Marines clear and search operation	Quảng Nam Province		
Jan 29 – Feb 9	Operation Sherman Peak	2nd Brigade, 101st Airborne Division and ARVN 1st Division clear and search operation	north of the A Shau Valley, Quảng Trị Province	1	
Jan 31 – Feb 8	Operation Wayne Arrow	3rd Battalion, 8th Infantry Regiment clear and search operation	Bình Định Province		
Jan 31 – Feb 12	Operation Hancock Knight	3rd Battalion, 506th Airborne Infantry Regiment clear and search operation	Lâm Đồng Province		
Jan 31 – Feb 17	Operation Greene Thunder	1st Battalion, 12th Infantry Regiment, and 1st Battalion, 14th Infantry Regiment clear and search operation	Kon Tum and Pleiku Provinces		
Jan 31 – Feb 25	Operation Greene Blue	2nd Battalion, 35th Infantry Regiment clear and search operation	Darlac Province		
Jan 31 – Mar 3	Operation Darby Crest	173rd Airborne Brigade and 1st Battalion, 503rd Airborne Infantry clear and search operation	Bình Định Province		
Jan 31 – Mar 16	Operation Putnam Panther	1st, 2nd and 3rd Battalions, 8th Infantry Regiment, 1st and 3rd Battalions, 12th Infantry Regiment; 1st Battalion, 14th Infantry Regiment; 1st Battalion, 22nd Infantry Regiment and 2nd Battalion, 35th Infantry Regiment clear and search operation	Kon Tum Province		
Feb 1 – May 6	Operation Greene Queen	2nd Battalion, 35th Infantry Regiment clear and search operation	Darlac Province		
Feb 1 – Nov 17 1970	Operation Hines	4th Infantry Division operations. Subordinate operations were the Wayne series (1st Brigade), the Putnam series (2d Brigade) and the Greene series (3d Brigade)			
Feb 2 – 7	Operation Wayne Dart	1st Battalion, 8th Infantry Regiment clear and search operation	Pleiku Province		
Feb 3 – 20	Operation Hancock Eagle	3rd Battalion, 506th Airborne Infantry Regiment clear and search operation	north of Phan Thiết, Bình Thuận Province	654	282
Feb 3 – Apr 16	Operation Darby Trail II	2nd Battalion, 503rd Airborne Infantry clear and search operation	Bình Định Province		
Feb 4 – 12	Operation Strangler I	199th Infantry Brigade cordon and search operation	Gia Định Province		
Feb 4 – Apr 19	Operation Cheyenne Sabre	3/1 Cavalry search and destroy operation	Biên Hòa Province	600	
Feb 7 – Mar 12	Operation Greene Cyclone	1st Battalion, 35th Infantry Regiment clear and search operation	Pleiku Province		
Feb 10 – 28	Operation Wayne Green	1st, 2nd & 3rd Battalions, 8th Infantry Regiment and 1st & 3rd Battalions, 12th Infantry Regiment clear and search operation	Kon Tum and Pleiku Provinces		
Feb 13 – 16	Operation Strangler II	199th Infantry Brigade cordon and search operation	Gia Định Province		
Feb 14 – Mar 28	Operation Navajo Warhorse II	1st Cavalry Division operation	Hậu Nghĩa Province		
Feb 16 – Oct 31	Operation Toan Thang III	25th Infantry Division and 3rd Brigade, 9th Infantry Division search and destroy operations	Bình Dương, Gia Dinh, Hậu Nghĩa, Long An and Tây Ninh Provinces	41,803	1,533
Feb 17 – Apr 2	Operation Federal	9th Battalion, Royal Australian Regiment and 4th Battalion, Royal Australian Regiment/Royal New Zealand Infantry Regiment (ANZAC) security operation	Biên Hòa Province		
Feb 20 – Mar 3	Operation Spokane Rapids	1st Brigade, 101st Airborne Division operation			
Feb 24 – Mar 10	Operation Quyet Thang 22	ARVN 2nd Division operation	Quảng Ngãi Province	777	
Feb 25 – 27	Operation Greene Tornado	2nd Battalion, 35th Infantry Regiment clear and search operation	Pleiku Province		
Feb 27 – May 8	Operation Purple Martin	1st Battalion, 4th Marines, 2nd Battalion, 4th Marines and 3rd Battalion, 4th Marines clear and search operation. Originally Operation Massachusetts Bay	Quảng Trị Province		
Feb 27 – Jun 20	Operation Quảng Nam	ARVN 1st Ranger Group operation	Quảng Nam Province	688	
Feb 28 – Apr 2	Operation Greene Thunder II	2nd Brigade, 4th Infantry Division clear and search operation	Pleiku Province		
Feb 28 – Mar 31 1971	Operation Iron Mountain	11th Infantry Brigade clear and search operation	along the Song Tra Khuc River south and west to Song Re River, Quảng Ngãi Province	4,476	340
Feb 28 – May 8	Operation Massachusetts Striker	2nd Brigade, 101st Airborne Division reconnaissance in force operation	A Shau Valley		
Mar 1 - 9	Operation Quintus Thrust	5th Battalion, Royal Australian Regiment reconnaissance in force	west of Nui Dat	11	3
Mar 1 – Apr 14	Operation Wayne Grey	1st, 2nd & 3rd Battalions, 8th Infantry Regiment, 3rd Battalion, 12th Infantry Regiment, 1st Battalion, 22nd Infantry Regiment and 1st Battalion, 35th Infantry Regiment clear and search operation	Kon Tum Province	608	
Mar 1 – Aug 14	Operation Kentucky Jumper	101st Airborne Division and ARVN 3rd Regiment, 1st Division clear and search operation	Thừa Thiên Province	317	61
Mar 4 – 25	Operation Darby Crest II	173rd Airborne Brigade and 1st Battalion, 503rd Airborne Infantry clear and search	Bình Định Province		
Mar 6	Operation Stingray I	173rd Airborne Brigade clear and search operation	Bình Định Province		
Mar 10 – Apr 8	Operation Federal Overlander	5th Battalion, Royal Australian Regiment reconnaissance in force	east of Long Binh base		2
Mar 11	Operation Stingray II	173rd Airborne Brigade clear and search operation	Bình Định Province		
Mar 12 – 14	Operation Lulu	3rd Brigade, 9th Infantry Division, 199th Infantry Brigade, ARVN 46th Regiment and 5th Ranger Group clear and search operation	Long An Province		
Mar 15 – May 2	Operation Maine Crag	1st Brigade, 5th Infantry Division, 1st Battalion, 3rd Marines, 2nd Battalion, 3rd Marines, 3rd Battalion, 3rd Marines and 1st Battalion, 12th Marines reconnaissance in force operation along the Laotian border	west of Khe Sanh, Quảng Trị Province	157	21
Mar 16 – Apr 15	Operation Darby Crest III	173rd Airborne Brigade and 1st Battalion, 503rd Airborne Infantry clear and search	Bình Định Province		
Mar 16 – Apr 15	Operation Darby March	173rd Airborne Brigade and 4th Battalion, 503rd Airborne Infantry clear and search operation	Phú Yên Province		
Mar 16 – Apr 29	Operation Remagen	1st Brigade, 5th Infantry Division reconnaissance in force	Quảng Trị Province		
Mar 17	Operation Rain Dance	USAF air support for Royal Lao Army counteroffensive	Plain of Jars		
Mar 17 – 29	Operation Atlas Wedge	1st Infantry Division, 11th Armored Cavalry Regiment, 1/4th Cavalry operation. After making contact, the PAVN were defeated with the "pile on" tactics using air strikes, air and armored cav, Rome Plows, and infantry	Michelin Rubber Plantation near Dầu Tiếng	421	
Mar 18 – May 2	Operation Breakfast	the first phase of secret B-52 bombing of eastern Cambodia; the start of a four-year bombing campaign that drew Cambodia into the Vietnam War	eastern Cambodia		
Mar 18 – May 28, 1970	Operation Menu	US Strategic Air Command secret bombing of Cambodia	Cambodia		
Mar 18 – Feb 28 1971	Operation Frederick Hill	196th Infantry Brigade and ARVN 5th Regiment clear and search operation	Quang Tin and Quảng Ngãi Provinces	7,524	600
Mar 18 – Feb 28 1971	Operation Geneva Park	198th Infantry Brigade clear and search operation	Quang Tin and Quảng Ngãi Provinces	2,237	253
Mar 19 – Apr 14	Operation Greene Hurricane	1st Battalion, 35th Infantry Regiment clear and search operation	Pleiku Province		
Mar 20 – 31	Operation Quyet Thang 25	ARVN 4th Regiment operation	Quảng Ngãi Province	592	
Mar 23 – 28	Operation Hancock Knight II	3rd Battalion, 506th Airborne Infantry Regiment clear and search operation	Lâm Đồng and Tuyen Muc Provinces		
Mar 23 – 31	Operation Hancock Eagle III	3rd Battalion, 506th Airborne Infantry Regiment clear and search operation	Bình Thuận Province		
Mar 23 – Apr 3	Operation Montana Mauler	3rd Marine Division, 1st Brigade, 5th Infantry Division and ARVN 2nd Regiment reconnaissance in force operation	vicinity of Con Thien, Quảng Trị Province	571	21
Mar 23 – Apr 7	Operation Clarksville	3rd Brigade, 101st Airborne Division security operation	Biên Hòa Province		
Mar 25	Operation Cane Field	1/1 Cavalry clear and search operation	Quảng Nam Province		
Mar 29 – Jun 23	Operation Montana Scout	1st Cavalry Division operation along the southern frontier of War Zone "C"	Tây Ninh Province	1,570	284
Mar 31 – May 29	Operation Oklahoma Hills	1st Battalion, 7th Marines, 2nd Battalion, 7th Marines, 3rd Battalion, 7th Marines and 3rd Battalion, 26th Marines and ARVN 51st Regiment clear and search operation	Happy Valley, Quảng Nam Province	596	44
Apr – May 70	Operation Sea Tiger	US Navy Swift Boats, River Division 543 PBRs, Vietnamese Coastal Group 14 junks, and River Assault Group 32 operation to clear and keep open the Cua Dai River for commercial and fishing activities	Cua Dai River		
Apr 2 – 10	Operation Overland	9th Battalion, Royal Australian Regiment reconnaissance in force operation	borders of Biên Hòa Province, Long Khánh Province and Phước Tuy Province		
Apr 3 – 7	Operation Hancock Knight III	3rd Battalion, 506th Airborne Infantry Regiment clear and search operation	Lâm Đồng Province		
Apr 6 – 20	Operation Muskogee Meadows	1st Battalion, 5th Marines, 2nd Battalion, 5th Marines and 3rd Battalion, 5th Marines clear and search operation	Quảng Nam Province	162	16
Apr 7 – 15	Operation Ellis Ravine	1st Brigade, 5th Infantry Division clear and search operation	Ba Long Valley, Quảng Trị Province		
Apr 10	Operation Atlas Power	1st Infantry Division security operation	near Saigon		
Apr 11 – 15	Operation Overlander	9th Battalion, Royal Australian Regiment reconnaissance in force operation	Biên Hòa Province		
Apr 12 – 18	Operation Deerstalk	5th Battalion, Royal Australian Regiment ambush and reconnaissance operations	west of Nui Dat	1	
Apr 12 – May 2	Operation Surfside	5th Battalion, Royal Australian Regiment reconnaissance in force operation against the VC D445 Battalion	Ho Tram Cape south of Xuyên Mộc, Phước Tuy Province	3	
Apr 12 – May 14	Operation Montana Raider	1st Cavalry Division and 11th Armored Cavalry Regiment operations from Dầu Tiếng to Quan Loi on a series of coordinated search operations designed to destroy the PAVN support and supply facilities along Route 13	Tây Ninh Province	358	
Apr 13 – 19	Operation Beaver Dam	5th Battalion, Royal Australian Regiment security for land-clearing operation	Phước Tuy Province		
Apr 13 – Oct 18	Operation Wayne Javelin	1st, 2nd & 3rd Battalions, 8th Infantry Regiment, 3rd Battalion, 12th Infantry Regiment, 1st Battalion, 69th Armor Regiment, 2nd Squadron, 1st Cavalry Regiment and 1st Squadron, 10th Cavalry Regiment clear and search operation	Bình Định and Pleiku Provinces		
Apr 14 – 27	Operation Greene Orange	2nd Battalion, 35th Infantry Regiment clear and search operation	Pleiku Province		
Apr 15 – Jan 1 1971	Operation Washington Green	173rd Airborne Brigade pacification operation	An Lao Valley, Bình Định Province	1,957	64
Apr 17 – May 1	Operation Greene Typhoon	1st Battalion, 35th Infantry Regiment clear and search operation	Pleiku Province		
Apr 17 – May 1	Operation Stafford	4th Battalion, Royal Australian Regiment/Royal New Zealand Infantry Regiment (ANZAC) reconnaissance in force operation	Phước Tuy Province		
Apr 18 – Dec 31	Operation Dan Thang 69	ARVN 22nd Division operation	Bình Định Province	507	
Apr 18 – Dec 31	Operation Dan Tien 33D	ARVN 23rd Regiment operation	Quang Duc Province	746	
Apr 21 – 22	Operation Greene Lion	1st and 2nd Battalions, 35th Infantry Regiment clear and search operation	Pleiku Province		
Apr 22 – Jun 20	Operation Lam Son 277	2nd ARVN Regiment operation	Quảng Trị Province	541	
Apr 22 – Sep 22	Operation Putnam Tiger	2nd and 3rd Battalions, 8th Infantry Regiment, 1st and 3rd Battalions, 12th Infantry Regiment, 1st Battalion, 22nd Infantry Regiment and 2nd Battalion, 35th Infantry Regiment operation	Kon Tum and Pleiku Provinces	563	435
Apr 23 – Jun 15	Operation Massachusetts Bay	1st Brigade, 5th Infantry Division patrolling and ambushes provided security and denied access to rice producing area to PAVN/VC	Base Area 101 and the districts of Quảng Trị Province		
Apr 24 – May 15	Operation Bristol Boots	1st Brigade, 101st Airborne Division operation	Ruong Ruong Valley, Thừa Thiên and Quảng Nam Provinces		
Apr 30 – May 14	Operation Greene Queen II	3rd Brigade, 4th Infantry Division clear and search operation	Darlac Province		
May 1 – 31	Operation Mailed Fist	B Squadron, 1st Armoured Regiment pacification and reconnaissance operation	Duc Thanh District		
May 1 – 16 July	Operation Virginia Ridge	1st Battalion, 3rd Marines, 2nd Battalion, 3rd Marines, 3rd Battalion, 3rd Marines, 1st Battalion, 12th Marines and 1st Brigade, 5th Infantry Division clear and search operation	DMZ	560	
May 2 – 5	Operation Greene Orange II	1st Battalion, 14th Infantry Regiment and 1st Battalion, 35th Infantry Regiment clear and search operation	Pleiku Province		
May 2 – 13	Operation Twickenham I	5th Battalion, Royal Australian Regiment ambush operations	around Nui Thi Vai Mountain	10	
May 5 – 20	Operation Daring Rebel	ARVN 2nd Division, ROK 2nd Marine Brigade, U.S. forces operation mounted to seek out and destroy Vietcong rest camps	Barrier Island, 24 km south of Da Nang	105	2
May 5 – Jun 21	Operation Greene Typhoon II	1st Battalion, 35th Infantry Regiment clear and search operation	Pleiku Province		
May 5 – Aug 4	Operation Greene Orange III	1st Battalion, 14th Infantry Regiment clear and search operation	Pleiku Province		
May 8 – Jun 15	Operation Reynella	9th Battalion, Royal Australian Regiment pacification operation	Phước Tuy Province		
May 8 – Jul 17	Operation Herkimer Mountain	1st Battalion, 4th Marines, 2nd Battalion, 4th Marines, 3rd Battalion, 4th Marines, 1st Battalion, 9th Marines, 2nd Battalion, 9th Marines and 3rd Battalion, 9th Marines clear and search operation	Quảng Tri Province		
May 10 – Jun 7	Operation Apache Snow	9th Marines and 101st Airborne Division operation	A Shau Valley, Thừa Thiên Province	977	54
May 13 – 22	Operation Roadside	5th Battalion, Royal Australian Regiment reconnaissance operations to prevent attacks by VC 5th Division on Long Binh base	Xuan Loc		1
May 15 – Jun 7	Operation Dan Quyen 38-A	ARVN 42nd Regiment and 22nd Ranger Group operation	Ben Het–Đắk Tô region of II Corps	945	
May 15 – Jun 21	Operation Greene Basket	3rd Brigade, 4th Infantry Division clear and search operation	Pleiku Province		
May 16 – Aug 13	Operation Lamar Plain	23rd Infantry Division, 1st Brigade, 101st Airborne Division and ARVN 1st Division operation	southwest of Tam Ky, Quảng Tín Province	524	116
May 18 – Jun 30	Operation Greene Gallop	3rd Brigade, 4th Infantry Division and 1st Squadron, 10th Cavalry Regiment clear and search operation	Pleiku Province		
May 22 – Jun 1	Operation Twickenham II	5th Battalion, Royal Australian Regiment search and destroy operations	around Nui Thi Vai Mountain and Nui Dinh		
May 24 – Jun 24	Operation Irish	3rd Brigade, 4th Infantry Division search and destroy operation			
May 29 – Jun 23	Operation Cameron Falls	2nd Battalion, 9th Marines and 3rd Battalion, 9th Marines operation	southwest of Ca Lu, Quảng Trị Province		
May 26 – Nov 7	Operation Pipestone Canyon	1st Battalion, 1st Marines, 2nd Battalion, 1st Marines, 3rd Battalion, 5th Marines, 1st Battalion, 26th Marines and ROK 2nd Marine Brigade clear and search operation	13 km west of Hội An, Qung Nam Province	852	71
May 30 – Jul 1	Operation Lavarack	6th Battalion, Royal Australian Regiment/Royal New Zealand Infantry Regiment (ANZAC) reconnaissance in force operations	north of Nui Dat	102	3
Jun – Jul	Operation Esso	5th Battalion, Royal Australian Regiment security operations	Đất Đỏ District		7
Jun 6 – 8	Operation Hammer	5th Battalion, Royal Australian Regiment operations against the PAVN 1st Battalion, 33rd Regiment	Bình Ba village	107	1
Jun 7 – 8	Operation Tong	5th Battalion, Royal Australian Regiment operations against the VC Châu Đức District Unit Company	Hoa Long village		
Jun 8 – Aug 15	Operation Montgomery Rendezvous	3rd Brigade, 101st Airborne Division clear and search operation	A Shau Valley, Thừa Thiên Province	393	70
Jun 12 – Jul 9	Operation Utah Mesa	1st Battalion, 9th Marines, 2nd Battalion, 9th Marines, 1st Brigade, 5th Infantry Division and ARVN 1st Division clear and search operation	vicinity of Khe Sanh, Quảng Trị Province	309	
Jun 15 – Sep 25	Operation Iroquois Grove	1st Brigade, 5th Infantry Division and 2nd Battalion, 5th Marines clear and search operation to protect civilians and assist in accelerated pacification program	PAVN Base Area 101 southeast of Quảng Trị City	134	13
Jun 21 – Aug 5	Operation Green Ax	1st and 2nd Battalions, 35th Infantry Regiment clear and search operation	Pleiku Province		
Jun 22 – Jan 31 1970	Operation Kentucky Cougar	3/1 Cavalry and 11th Armored Cavalry Regiment operation	Binh Long, Gia Định and Tây Ninh Provinces		
Jun 23 – Jul 1	Operation Tennessee Pride	101st Airborne Division clear and search operation	Thừa Thiên Province		
Jun 26	Operation Sea Float/Solid Anchor/Tran Hung Dao III	Joint US/Vietnamese attempt to inject an allied presence into An Xuyen Province, 175 miles southwest of Saigon to penetrate areas traditionally controlled by the VC and to extend allied control over the strategic Nam Can region of the Cà Mau Peninsula	An Xuyen Province		
Jun 29 – Aug 30	Operation Keystone Eagle	9th Marine Regiment redeployment from South Vietnam to Okinawa		n/a	n/a
Jun 29 – Jul 17	Operation Matthew	9th Battalion, Royal Australian Regiment reconnaissance in force operation	Long Khánh Province		4
Jun 30 – Jul 3	Operation Forsythe Grove	1st Battalion, 5th Marines, 2nd Battalion, 5th Marines and 1st Battalion, 7th Marines clear and search operation	Quảng Nam Province		
Jul – Mar 70	Operation Dong Tien	1st Infantry Division support for Vietnamization program			
Jul 3 – Sep 21	Operation Arlington Canyon	2nd Battalion 4th Marines and 3rd Battalion 4th Marines clear and search and security operations	around Vandegrift Combat Base	23	10
Jul 5	Operation Waiouru	6th Battalion, Royal Australian Regiment/Royal New Zealand Infantry Regiment (ANZAC) and 1st Armoured Regiment road clearing operation along Route 15	between Ba Ria and Phú Mỹ		
Jul 12	Operation Williams Glade	1st Battalion, 4th Marines and 1st Brigade, 5th Infantry Division search and clear operation	between Mai Loc and Ba Long, Quảng Trị Province		
Jul 12 – Aug 15	Operation Campbell Steamer	2nd Brigade, 101st Airborne Division and 2nd Battalion, 502nd Airborne Infantry Regiment clear and search operation	Quảng Nam and Thừa Thiên Provinces		
Jul 14 – Aug 15	Operation Mundingburra	6th Battalion, Royal Australian Regiment/Royal New Zealand Infantry Regiment (ANZAC) reconnaissance in force, ambush, patrolling and village security operation	Đất Đỏ and Long Điền Districts		10
Jul 15 – 30	Operation Gaffey Base	1st Brigade, 4th Infantry Division clear and search operation	Bình Định Province		
Jul 15 – 31	Operation Greene Jack	3rd Brigade, 4th Infantry Division operation	Pleiku Province		
Jul 16 – Sep 25	Operation Georgia Tar	1st Battalion, 4th Marines, 2nd Battalion, 4th Marines, 3rd Battalion, 4th Marines and 3rd Battalion, 9th Marines clear and search operation	northeast of Khe Sanh, Quảng Trị Province	40	1
Jul 17 – 31	Operation Hat Dich	9th Battalion, Royal Australian Regiment reconnaissance in force	Phước Tuy Province		
Jul 17 – Aug 7	Operation Ginger	B Squadron, 1st Armoured Regiment pacification operation	Duc Than District		
Jul 20 – Aug 13	Operation Durham Peak	1st Battalion, 1st Marines, 2nd Battalion, 1st Marines, 2nd Battalion, 5th Marines, 3rd Battalion, 5th Marines, 2nd Battalion, 11th Marines and ARVN 21st and 37th Ranger Battalions clear and search operation	Quảng Nam and Quảng Tín Provinces		
Jul 20 – Mar 8 1971	Operation Nantucket Beach	198th Infantry Brigade and ARVN 2nd Division clear and search operation	Batangan Peninsula, Quảng Ngãi Province	630	
Jul 21 – 26	Operation Distant Trumpet	5th Battalion, Royal Australian Regiment operation to locate and engage elements of the VC D445 Battalion	near Xuyen Moc		
Jul 21 – Sep 21	Operation Strangle	1st Infantry Division operation	Bình Dương Province	365	
Jul 21 – Sep 25	Operation Idaho Canyon	3rd Marine Regiment operation	north-central Quảng Trị Province	565	159
Jul 28	Operation Nutcracker	2nd Brigade, 25th Infantry Division operation against VC 268th Regiment			
Jul 29	Operation Double Shift	105 US and Vietnamese riverine craft were concentrated to protect against enemy threats to Tây Ninh city	Vam Co Dong north of Go Dau Ha		
Jul 29 – Aug 30	Operation Camden II	5th Battalion, Royal Australian Regiment operation to protect a land clearing team (US), and conduct reconnaissance in force (RIF) operations to locate and destroy VC main force units in AO (Area Operations) Mindy	between Route 15 (Saigon to Vũng Tàu), Route 2 (Ba Ria to Xuyen Moc) and Route 1		
Aug 1 – 14	Operation Platypus (1969)	B Squadron, 1st Armoured Regiment interdiction of VC movement across Route 15	Phước Tuy Province		
Aug 4 – Oct 16	Operation Greene Ace	2nd Battalion, 8th Infantry Regiment, 1st Battalion, 14th Infantry Regiment, 1st and 2nd Battalions, 35th Infantry Regiment clear and search operation	Pleiku Province		
Aug 8 – Sep 28	Operation Cumberland Thunder	1st Brigade, 101st Airborne Division and ARVN 1st Division operation	Thừa Thiên Province		
Aug 14 – Sep 28	Operation Carolina Blaster	3rd Brigade, 101st Airborne Division and ARVN 3rd Regiment search and clear operation	A Shau Valley and Đa Krông Valley in Quảng Trị and Thừa Thiên Provinces		
Aug 14 – Sep 28	Operation Richland Square	3rd Brigade, 101st Airborne Division and ARVN 3rd Regiment clear and search operation	A Shau and Đa Krông Vallies, Quảng Trị and Thừa Thiên Provinces		
Aug 15 – Sep 15	Operation Neppabunna	9th Battalion, Royal Australian Regiment reconnaissance in force and pacification operation	Đất Đỏ and Xuyên Mộc Districts, Phước Tuy Province		
Aug 15 – Sep 28	Operation Claiborne Chute	2nd Brigade, 101st Airborne Division clear and search and rice harvest security operation	Quảng Trị and Thừa Thiên Provinces		
Aug 15 – Sep 28	Operation Louisiana Lee	3rd Brigade, 101st Airborne Division and ARVN 1st Division operation	A Shau Valley		
Aug 18 – Sep 24	Operation Bull Run I	5th Special Forces Group and 3rd Mike Force reconnaissance in force operation	Phước Long Province		
Aug 25 – Dec 31	Operation Lien Ket 414	ARVN 4th Regiment operation	Quảng Ngãi Province	710	
Aug 25 – Dec 31	Operation Lien Ket 531	ARVN 5th Regiment operation	Quảng Tín Province	542	
Aug 29 – Sep 30	Operation Burnham	6th Battalion, Royal Australian Regiment/Royal New Zealand Infantry Regiment (ANZAC), 199th Infantry Brigade and Royal Thai Army Volunteer Force reconnaissance and land-clearing operation	Phước Tuy Province		
Sep 3 – Oct 4	Operation Chieftain	B Squadron, 1st Armoured Regiment pacification operation	Duc Than District		
Sep 7	Operation Defiant Stand	ROK 2nd Marine Brigade and 1st Battalion, 26th Marines amphibious assault	Barrier Island, 55 km south of Da Nang.		
Sep 10 – Oct 11	Operation Wayne Boulder	1st Battalion, 8th Infantry Regiment clear and search operation	Bình Định Province		
Sep 14 – Oct 15	Operation Kingston	5th Battalion, Royal Australian Regiment operation to locate and engage elements of the VC D445 Battalion	near Thua Tich village		
Sep 18 – Dec 15	Operation Keystone Cardinal	3rd Marine Division redeployment from South Vietnam to the United States			
Sep 21 – Oct 28	Operation Putnam Cougar	2nd Brigade, 4th Infantry Division clear and search operation	Bình Định Province		
Sep 27 – Oct 7	Operation Hancock Flame	3rd Battalion, 506th Airborne Infantry Regiment clear and search operation	Bình Thuận Province		
Sep 28 – Dec 6	Operation Republic Square	101st Airborne Division clear and search operation	Quảng Trị and Thừa Thiên Provinces		
Sep 29 – Nov 8	Operation Norton Falls	3rd Brigade, 101st Airborne Division operation to screen the deployment of the 4th Marines	Quảng Trị and Thừa Thiên Provinces		
Sep 29 – Dec 31	Operation Quyet Thang 21/38	ARVN 32nd Regiment operation	An Xuyen Province	721	
Sep 30 – Oct 31	Operation Jack	9th Battalion, Royal Australian Regiment reconnaissance in force operation	Biên Hòa Province		
Oct 1 – 5	Operation Darby Trail III	4th Infantry Division and 173rd Airborne Brigade clear and search operation	Bình Định Province		
Oct 5 – Dec 4	Operation Saturate	101st Airborne Division and ARVN 54th Regiment clear and search operation	Thừa Thiên Province		
Oct 14 – Nov 24	Operation Hartle Green	4th Infantry Division security operation	Bình Định and Pleiku Provinces		
Oct 14 – Nov 30	Operation Ross	6th Battalion, Royal Australian Regiment/Royal New Zealand Infantry Regiment (ANZAC) ambush and reconnaissance operation	Phước Tuy Province		
Oct 16 – Jan 6 1970	Operation Cramer White	1st Squadron, 10th Cavalry security operation	along Route 14	52	2
Oct 16 – Jan 30 1970	Operation Greene Bear	1st and 2nd Battalions, 8th Infantry Regiment, 3rd Battalion, 12th Infantry Regiment, 1st Battalion, 14th Infantry Regiment, 1st and 2nd Battalions, 35th Infantry Regiment and 1st Squadron, 10th Cavalry Regiment clear and search operation	Kon Tum and Pleiku Provinces		
Oct 18 – Jan 4 1970	Operation Wayne Breaker	1st and 3rd Battalions, 8th Infantry Regiment pacification and security operations	Bình Định and Pleiku Provinces		
Oct 20 – Nov 19	Operation Hodges Black	2nd Battalion, 8th Infantry Regiment clear and search operation	Pleiku Province		
Oct 20 – Nov 20	Operation Greene Bullet	3rd Battalion, 12th Infantry Regiment and 1st Battalion, 35th Infantry Regiment operation	Pleiku Province		
Oct 21 – 24	Operation Cliff Dweller	1st Brigade, 25th Infantry Division operation	Nui Ba Den (Black Virgin Mountain) in Tây Ninh Province		
Oct 22	Operation Union Square	US operation	Quảng Trị Province		
Oct 22 – Jan 18 1970	Operation Fulton Square	ARVN 1st Division, 101st Airborne Division, 1st Brigade, 5th Infantry Division operation	Quảng Trị Province	339	28
Oct 31 – Dec 12	Operation Kings Cross	5th Battalion, Royal Australian Regiment operation against the VC 274th Regiment	along Route 15		
Nov 1 – Jan 18 1970	Operation Putnam Wildcat	1st Battalion, 12th Infantry Regiment and 1st Battalion, 22nd Infantry Regiment clear and search operation	Bình Định Province		
Nov 1 – Apr 10 1970	Operation Commando Hunt II	USAF dry season area interdiction campaign in Laos			
Nov 1 – May 1	Operation Toan Thang IV	1st Cavalry Division, 1st Infantry Division, 3rd Brigade, 9th Infantry Division and 25th Infantry Division search and destroy operations to prevent PAVN/VC movement and operations	III Corps and IV Corps	14,479	685
Nov 11 – Dec 29	Operation Wayne Rock	1st Brigade, 4th Infantry Division pacification operation	Darlac Province		
Nov 11 – Dec 30	Operation Spragins White	1st Battalion, 14th Infantry Regiment, 35th Infantry Regiment and 3rd Battalion, 506th Airborne Infantry Regiment	Darlac Province		
Nov 12 – Dec 28	Operation Dan Tien 40	ARVN 23rd Regiment operation	Quang Duc Province	1012	
Nov 14 – 17	Operation Burtrand	5th Special Forces Group and 3rd Mike Force reconnaissance in force operation	Hon Tre Island southeast of Nha Trang		
Nov 21 – 29	Operation While Away	2nd Battalion, 16th Infantry Regiment security operation	Biên Hòa Province		
Nov 24 – 27	Operation Texas Traveller	3rd Squadron, 11th Armored Cavalry Regiment operation	III Corps		
Nov 24 – 28	Operation Ransom Raider	199th Infantry Brigade and ARVN 18th Division clear and search operation	Long Khánh Province		
Nov 24 – Jan 30 1970	Operation Waldron Blue	2nd Battalion, 8th Infantry Regiment highway security operation	Pleiku Province		
Nov 28 – Dec 28	Operation Marsden	6th Battalion, Royal Australian Regiment/Royal New Zealand Infantry Regiment (ANZAC) ambush and reconnaissance operation	Phước Tuy Province		
Dec 2 – Jan 5 1970	Operation Hughes Black	2nd Battalion, 8th Infantry Regiment highway security operation	Bình Định Province		
Dec 5 – 26	Operation Long Reach II	11th Armored Cavalry Regiment operation	Bình Long Province		
Dec 7 – Mar 31 1970	Operation Randolph Glen	101st Airborne Division and ARVN 1st Division clear and search operation on edge of populated lowlands	eastern Thừa Thiên Province	670	
Dec 10 – Jan 10 1970	Operation Atherton	8th Battalion, Royal Australian Regiment operation to drive the elements of VC 274th Regiment into the border area, by reconnaissance in force, to ambush locations in the east	along the Long Khánh Province/Phước Tuy Province borders		
Dec 14 – 24	Operation Vintage Rally	5th Battalion, Royal Australian Regiment reconnaissance and ambush operations	Phước Tuy Province		
Dec 22 – 24	Operation Tangle	A Squadron, 1st Armoured Regiment pacification operation	Duc Thanh District, Phước Tuy Province		
Dec 27 – Feb 16 1970	Operation Bondi	5th Battalion, Royal Australian Regiment cordon and search	Duc Trung, Bình Ba and Duc My villages		

== See also ==
- List of allied military operations of the Vietnam War (1970)
