= Operation Robin =

Part of the Vietnam War (1968)

- Part of the Vietnam War
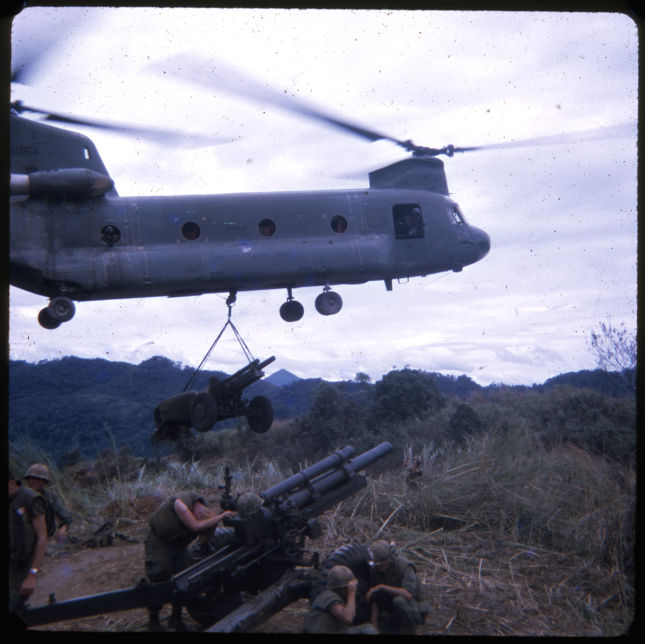
- CH-47 lands a 105mm gun at Landing Zone Robin
Date	2–19 June 1968
Location	Vietnam Salient, Quảng Trị Province, South Vietnam 16.579°N 106.753°E
Result	U.S. victory

Belligerents
United States of America	North Vietnam

Commanders and leaders
Raymond G. Davis	

Strength
3rd Marine Division: 4th Marine Regiment; 1st Battalion, 1st Marines; 2nd Battalion, 3rd Marines; 3rd Battalion, 9th Marines; 1st Battalion, 12th Marines	308th Infantry Division: 88th Infantry Regiment; 102nd Infantry Regiment

Casualties and losses
65+ killed	US body count: 635 killed 48 captured

Operation Robin was a U.S. Marine Corps operation that took place southeast of Khe Sanh, Quảng Trị Province from 2–19 June 1968.

== Background ==
In late May 1968 US aerial reconnaissance detected a People's Army of Vietnam (PAVN) supply road being constructed through the jungle from the Ho Chi Minh Trail in Laos parallel to, but 15 km south of, Route 9 in an area known as the "Vietnam Salient" where Vietnam protrudes into Laos.

The 3rd Marine Division planned Operation Robin as a two-stage operation, in Operation Robin North the 1st Marine Regiment would attempt to engage the recently infiltrated PAVN 88th and 102nd Regiments of the 308th Division south of Route 9, while in Operation Robin South the 4th Marine Regiment would conduct airmobile operations further south and locate and destroy the PAVN supply road.

In preparation for the operation 219 attack aircraft and 30 B-52 sorties were flown against the intended landing zones while Marine artillery fired over 10,000 rounds.

== Operation Robin North ==
On 2 June the 1st Battalion, 1st Marines conducted a helicopter assault into Landing Zone Robin (16.576°N 106.787°E) 10 km southeast of Khe Sanh and then moved north towards Route 9 in an attempt push the PAVN against the 2nd Battalion, 3rd Marines blocking positions on Route 9. That evening the 2nd Battalion 4th Marines was lifted to Robin from Ca Lu Combat Base. On the morning of 3 June the 1st Battalion, 4th Marines relieved the 2/4 Marines at Landing Zone Robin.

The 2/4 Marines boarded helicopters to assault into Landing Zone Loon (16.579°N 106.753°E) 4 km west of Robin and approximately 8 km southeast of Khe Sanh. The initial landing at Loon on 3 June was met by the PAVN with small arms, mortar and artillery fire. At 06:00 on 4 June a company from the PAVN 88th Regiment attacked Company F 2/4 Marines resulting in two U.S. and 34 PAVN killed.

The 4th Marines headquarters was established at LZ Robin on 4 June and the 1st Battalion, 12th Marines arrived to establish and artillery base. Companies from the 1/4 Marines replaced the 2/4 Marines on Loon on 4 June and the 2/4 Marines were lifted to establish Landing Zone Crow 2 km northeast of Loon.

On 5 June Company C 1/1 Marines encountered a PAVN bunker system 4 km south of Route 9, the battle continued until the following afternoon.

At 06:00 on 6 June a PAVN Battalion attacked Landing Zone Loon, after a two-hour battle that resulted in 154 PAVN dead, the PAVN withdrew under cover of mortar and artillery fire. Due to the steady pressure on Loon it was decided to evacuate the landing zone and during the afternoon the 1/4 Marines were extracted by helicopter. The last HMM-165 CH-46 (#152533) to leave Loon was hit by PAVN anti-aircraft fire and crashed resulting in 13 U.S. killed. The total U.S. losses for their three days at Loon was 24 dead and 37 wounded.

== Operation Robin South ==
On 6 June the 3rd Battalion, 9th Marines conducted a helicopter assault into a landing zone southeast of Robin and near the eastern end of the PAVN supply road. The Marines found that the road was well constructed, up to 18 ft wide with numerous culverts and the trees overhead tied together to reduce aerial observation. Beside the road were bunkers, hospitals kitchens and storehouses. The 3/9 Marines moved west along the road for several days destroying it and PAVN facilities as they went.

On 11 June the 3rd Battalion, 4th Marines helicopter assaulted into Lang Hole, a Montagnard village south of Landing Zone Loon, where PAVN prisoners indicated a major supply area was located.

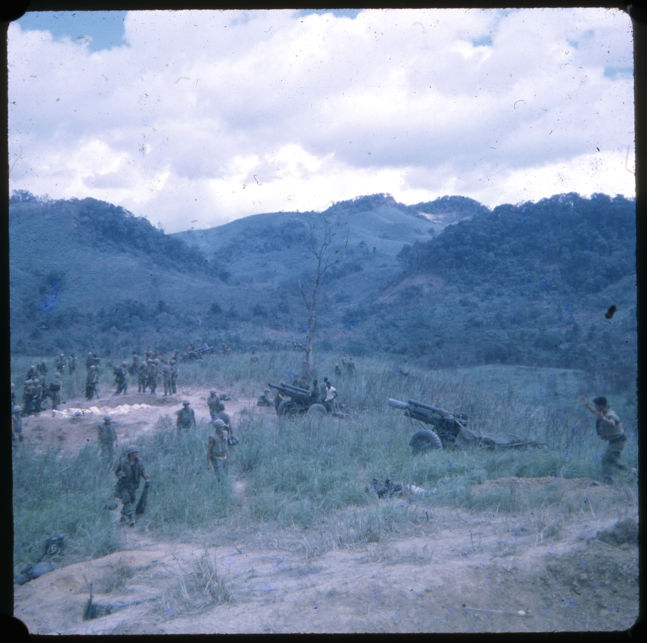
Landing Zone Torch, June 1968

On 14 June 2/4 Marines were lifted by helicopter onto the PAVN road near the Laos border and moved east to link up with the 3/9 Marines locating and destroying numerous bunkers and stores as they went.

Shortly before dawn on 15 June a Battalion of the PAVN 88th Regiment attacked the 3/4 Marines near Lang Hole penetrating the Marine position. The battle continued until 9am when the PAVN withdrew pursued by helicopter gunships. Marine losses were 16 dead and 58 wounded while PAVN losses were 219 dead and 11 captured.

At 02:15 on 16 June the PAVN attacked the 1/4 Marines at Landing Zone Torch (16.527°N 106.78°E) penetrating the Marine perimeter. Battery C 1/12 Marines levelled their guns and fired Beehive rounds into the attackers. The PAVN withdrew at 04:00 leaving 28 dead while Marine losses were 14 dead.

On the morning of 18 June the PAVN attacked Company K 3/4 Marines' night defensive position in a daylong battle the Marines with air and artillery support repulsed the PAVN attack resulting in 11 Marines killed and 30 wounded while the PAVN lost 131 killed.

== Aftermath ==
Operation Robin concluded on 19 June when the 4th Marines returned to Khe Sanh Combat Base. PAVN losses were 635 killed and 48 captured.

The Marines would penetrate into the Vietnam Salient again during Operation Maine Crag from 15 March to 2 May 1969 reopening Landing Zone Torch.
