= USS Satyr =

US Navy landing craft repair ship

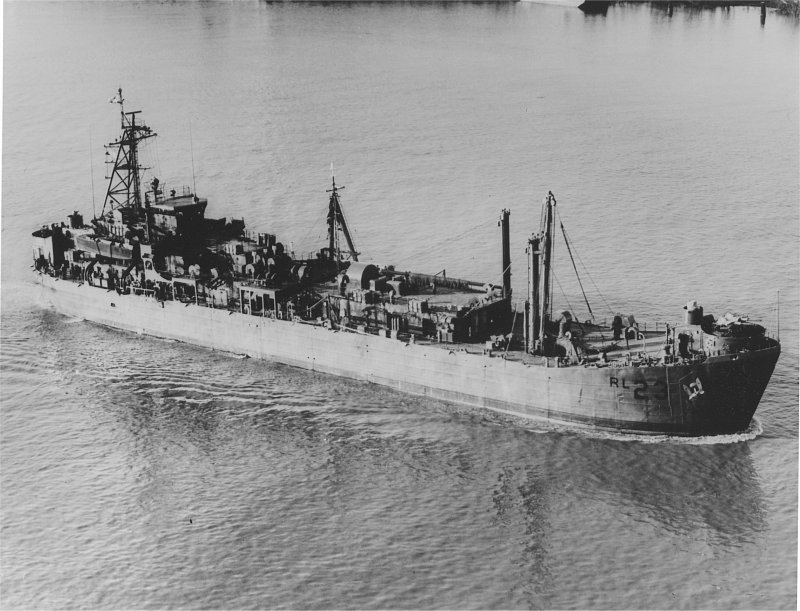

History

United States
- Name: Satyr
- Namesake: Satyr
- Builder: Bethlehem Shipbuilding Corporation
- Laid down: 16 August 1944
- Launched: 13 November 1944
- Commissioned: 27 November 1944
- Decommissioned: 1 August 1947
- Recommissioned: 8 September 1950
- Decommissioned: 17 April 1956
- Recommissioned: 15 February 1968
- Decommissioned: 30 September 1971
- Fate: Transferred to South Vietnam, 30 September 1971

South Vietnam
- Name: Vinh Long
- Acquired: City of Vinh Long or, Province of Vihn Long
- Commissioned: 30 September 1971
- Decommissioned: 1975
- Fate: Transferred to the Philippines, 1975

Philippines
- Name: Yakal
- Namesake: Shorea astylosa
- Acquired: 1975

General characteristics
- Class & type: Achelous-class repair ship
- Displacement: 2,125 long tons (2,159 t) light; 4,100 long tons (4,166 t) full
- Length: 328 ft (100 m)
- Beam: 50 ft (15 m)
- Draft: 11 ft 2 in (3.40 m)
- Propulsion: 2 × General Motors 12-567 diesel engines, two shafts, twin rudders
- Speed: 12 knots (14 mph; 22 km/h)
- Complement: 255 officers and enlisted men
- Armament: 2 × quad 40 mm guns (with Mark 51 director); 2 × twin 40 mm guns (with Mark 51 director); 6 × twin 20 mm guns

Service record
- Operations: Korean War; Vietnam War
- Awards: 2 battle stars (Korea); 3 battle stars (Vietnam)

USS Satyr (ARL-23) was one of 39 Achelous-class landing craft repair ships built for the United States Navy during World War II. Named for the Satyr (a sylvan deity in Greek mythology), she was the only US Naval vessel to bear the name.

Originally laid down as LST-852 on 16 August 1944, by the Chicago Bridge and Iron Company of Seneca, Illinois; launched on 13 November 1944; and commissioned on 27 November 1944. Following her initial commissioning, LST-852 proceeded to Jacksonville, Florida, where she was decommissioned on 28 December 1944; was converted to a landing craft repair ship; and recommissioned as USS Satyr (ARL-23) on 28 April 1945.

== Service history ==
=== World War II ===
During the next month, she underwent training exercises in Chesapeake Bay; and, on 3 June, she departed the east coast for the Panama Canal, California, and duty in the Pacific Fleet. By the end of July, the ARL had crossed the International Date Line; and, on 10 August, she joined the Pacific Fleet's Amphibious Force at Guam. Ten days later, she continued west in a convoy of LSTs and APDs, but a collision the next day sent her to Saipan for repairs to her bow doors. Repairs were completed on 28 August. Temporary duty with Service Division 103 (ServDiv 103) occupied the first week of September. On 10 September, she sailed for Okinawa, whence she continued on to Japan for occupation duty. Satyr anchored in Tokyo Bay off Yokosuka on 25 September. On 1 October, she cleared the bay, moved north to Hokkaidō, and operated out of Otaru, for two months. She then returned to Yokosuka where she joined ServDiv 102. In April 1946, she shifted to the China Coast. In July, she returned to Japan; and, at mid-month, sailed for the United States.

Steaming via Pearl Harbor, Satyr arrived in California, in September, and for the next ten months, operated out of San Pedro, in support of various amphibious commands. On 1 August 1947, she was decommissioned and berthed with the San Diego Group, Pacific Reserve Fleet.

=== Korean War ===
Three years later, in June 1950, the North Korean People's Army crossed the 38th parallel and invaded the Republic of Korea. In early August, Satyr was ordered activated. On 8 September, she was recommissioned; and, on 23 October, she assumed duties as landing craft tender at San Diego. For the next four months, she supported units training off southern California; then, on 2 March 1951, she headed west toward Japan and the Korean Peninsula. She arrived in Yokosuka on 7 April and departed on 24 April. On 28 April, she took up duties as a landing craft tender at Pusan and continued that service until mid-July. She then returned to Japan where she provided similar services at Sasebo and Yokosuka and participated in amphibious training exercises in northern Honshū and Hokkaidō. On 14 December, she headed back to California, and tender duties at San Diego. After the cessation of open hostilities in Korea, Satyr returned to the Far East. Arriving in Yokosuka, on 21 September 1953, she participated in amphibious assault exercises in northern Japan, during October; provided tender services in ServDiv 31 into January 1954; participated in further exercises in the Ryukyu, Benin, and Volcano Islands and supported SeaBee operations at Buckner Bay into March. She then sailed for Yokosuka to prepare for recrossing the Pacific to California.

Returning to San Diego, in early May, Satyr performed tender services there until 1 October, when she was transferred to Long Beach, and assigned to Amphibious Squadron 7 for operational control. On 11 October, she sailed for her new homeport, whence she operated until again ordered inactivated in January 1956. She returned to San Diego; and, on 17 April 1956, she was again decommissioned and berthed with the Pacific Reserve Fleet.

=== Vietnam War ===
In December 1966, the ARL was ordered reactivated a second time. She spent 1967 in New Orleans, for modernization. On 15 February 1968, she was recommissioned at the Naval Support Activity, Algiers, Louisiana; and, a month later, she headed for San Diego, her homeport. Refresher training was completed at the end of May. On 5 June, she sailed for the western Pacific. On 5 July, she arrived at Subic Bay; and, on 10 July, she anchored at Vũng Tàu, Republic of Vietnam. The next day, Satyr moved into the Mekong Delta; and, on 12 July, joined TF 117, the Mobile Riverine Force. Based primarily at Dong Tam Base Camp, she operated throughout the delta area. On 25 July, she proceeded to the junction of the Soirap and Vanco Rivers, near Nha Be, where she operated for nearly two months. On 16 September, she returned to Dong Tam. In early October, she supported operations in the Vinh Long area; and, toward the end of the month, she entered the Bassac River and proceeded to the Can Tho area. During November, she supported units at Long Xuyen, Dai Ngai, and Can Tho. In mid-December, she moved into the Gulf of Thailand to support units participating in Operation Sea Lords. On 23 December, she escorted boats to Rach Gia, whence she returned to Can Tho, arriving on 26 December, to resume support operations for TG 117.2.

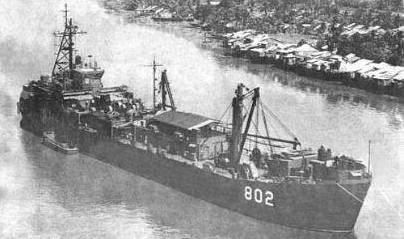
The ex-USS Satyr (ARL-23) in South Vietnamese service as RVNS Vinh Long (HQ 802).

Satyr remained in the delta area for another three months, then proceeded to Sasebo, Japan. On 15 June 1969, she returned to Dong Tam, and rejoined TP 117. A month later, that task force was dissolved and operational control of Satyr shifted to Commander, Naval Support Activity, Saigon. In October, Satyr again moved into the Gulf of Thailand; and, from then into January 1970, she operated in the vicinity of the Song Ong Doc. Ten days into the new year, she entered the Bassac River en route to An Long, where she arrived two days later and commenced support of Operation Barrier Reef. In May, she moved up the Mekong River to the vicinity of the Cambodian border and, into August, supported American and Vietnamese naval and marine units involved in "Tran Hung Dao" I, VII, XI, XVII, and XVIII. In September, she returned to Vung Tau, whence she again proceeded to Japan, for overhaul and repairs. By mid-December, she was back in the Mekong Delta area; and, on 19 December, she arrived at Tan Chau, to resume support operations along the Cambodian border. With one run to Long Xuyen, she remained in the Tan Chau area until 15 February 1971, then returned to Long Xuyen, whence she operated until decommissioned and transferred to the Republic of Vietnam Navy on 30 September.

She was recommissioned the same day as RVNS Vinh Long (HQ-802).Placed in the custody of the Philippines government in 1975, with the fall of the South Vietnamese Government, and she was brought to Subic Bay, Zambales, Philippines. Because there was need of a repair ship in the Philippine Navy the ship was transferred to the Philippine Government through the foreign military sales (FMS). Named BRP YAKAL (ARL-517) the vessel was commissioned on 21 June 1983, and placed under the Naval Forces on 1 August 1983. Later the bow number was changed from ARL-517 to ARL-617 and finally to AD-617. Her first commanding officer was CDR Victor Salazar, PN. She started her tour in the southern Philippines under the Commander Naval Forces Philippines on 2 November 1983. Aside from mobile repairs rendered to the units of NAVFORSOUTH she had performed other missions. Notably, the Barrier/Negation patrol along the Philippine-Malaysian border during the Maldanas incident in October 1985, the sealift of Filipino repatriates from Indonesia to the Philippines in February 1986, the support mission for President Corazon C. Aquino's visit to Jolo, and lately, the transport of 600 Boy Scouts from General Santos, during the BSP National Jamboree, 11–17 November 1988, in Zamboanga City. Other missions include transport of personnel, anti-smuggling negation patrols, and as a logistic ship for small craft. Decommissioned on 7 June 2001. Yakal is reefed in 2004.

Satyr earned 2 campaign stars for her service during the Korean War and 3 for her service in the Vietnam War.
