= Operation Maine Crag =

Part of the Vietnam War (1969)

- Part of the Vietnam War
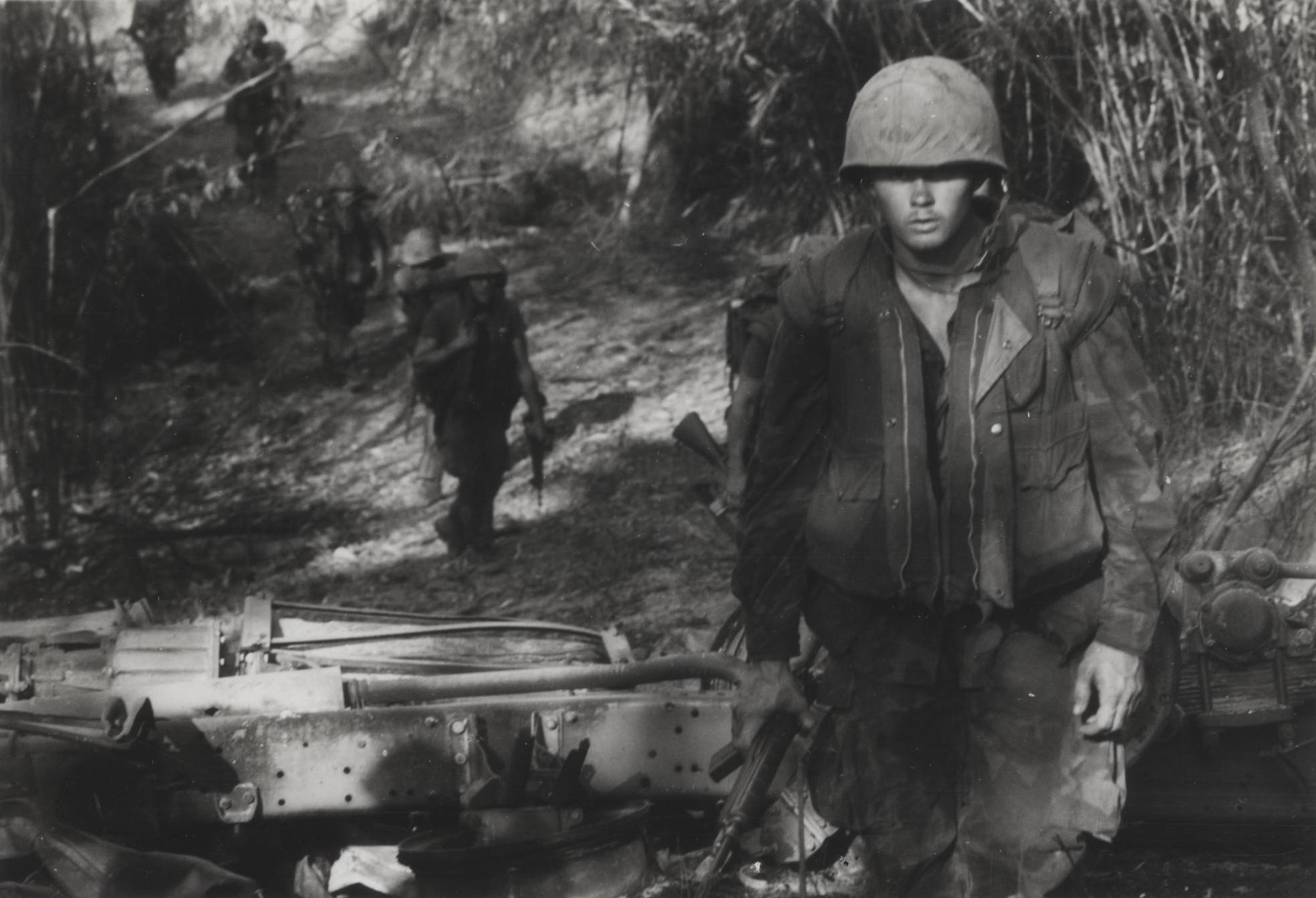
- 2/3 Marines pass a destroyed PAVN truck
Date	15 March – 2 May 1969
Location	Vietnam Salient, Quảng Trị Province, South Vietnam 16.579°N 106.753°E
Result	Allies claim operational success

Belligerents
United States; South Vietnam	North Vietnam

Commanders and leaders
(United States) Paul D. Lafond (South Vietnam) Hoàng Xuân Lãm	Unknown

Strength
(United States) 2nd Battalion 3rd Marines; 1st Battalion 3rd Marines; 1st Battalion 12th Marines; Company B, 1st Battalion, 61st Mechanized Infantry; 1st Battalion, 77th Armor; 1st Battalion, 44th Artillery (South Vietnam) 3rd Battalion, 2nd Regiment	Unknown

Casualties and losses
Unknown	US body count: 207 killed

Operation Maine Crag was a US Marine Corps, United States Army and Army of the Republic of Vietnam (ARVN) operation that took place in northwest Quảng Trị Province, lasting from 15 March – 2 May 1969.

== Background ==
Since early March 1969, U.S. reconnaissance detected an increase in People's Army of Vietnam (PAVN) activity south of Route 9 in the area known as the "Vietnam Salient" where Vietnam protrudes into Laos as the PAVN sought alternative supply routes to avoid U.S. forces engaged on Operation Dewey Canyon against Base Area 611 and Operation Massachusetts Striker in the A Shau Valley The plan for the operation called for the 1st Battalion 3rd Marines and 2nd Battalion 3rd Marines to launch a helicopter assault from Firebase Snapper (16.587°N 106.701°E), 4 km south of Lang Vei to establish fire support bases in the south of the salient and then conduct search operations along Route 616, supported by the ARVN 3rd Battalion, 2nd Regiment. Several days later an Army task force Task Force Remagen comprising Company B, 1st Battalion, 61st Mechanized Infantry, 1st Battalion, 77th Armor, 1st Battalion, 44th Artillery and Army and Marine bulldozer teams under operational control of the 3rd Marine Regiment would move west from Vandegrift Combat Base along Route 9 to Lang Vei and then south to join up with the Marines, deterring any PAVN armored threat. On 10 March 2/3 Marines deployed by helicopter to Landing Zone Hawk south of Route 9 and marched the 7 km to Landing Zone Snapper.

== Operation ==
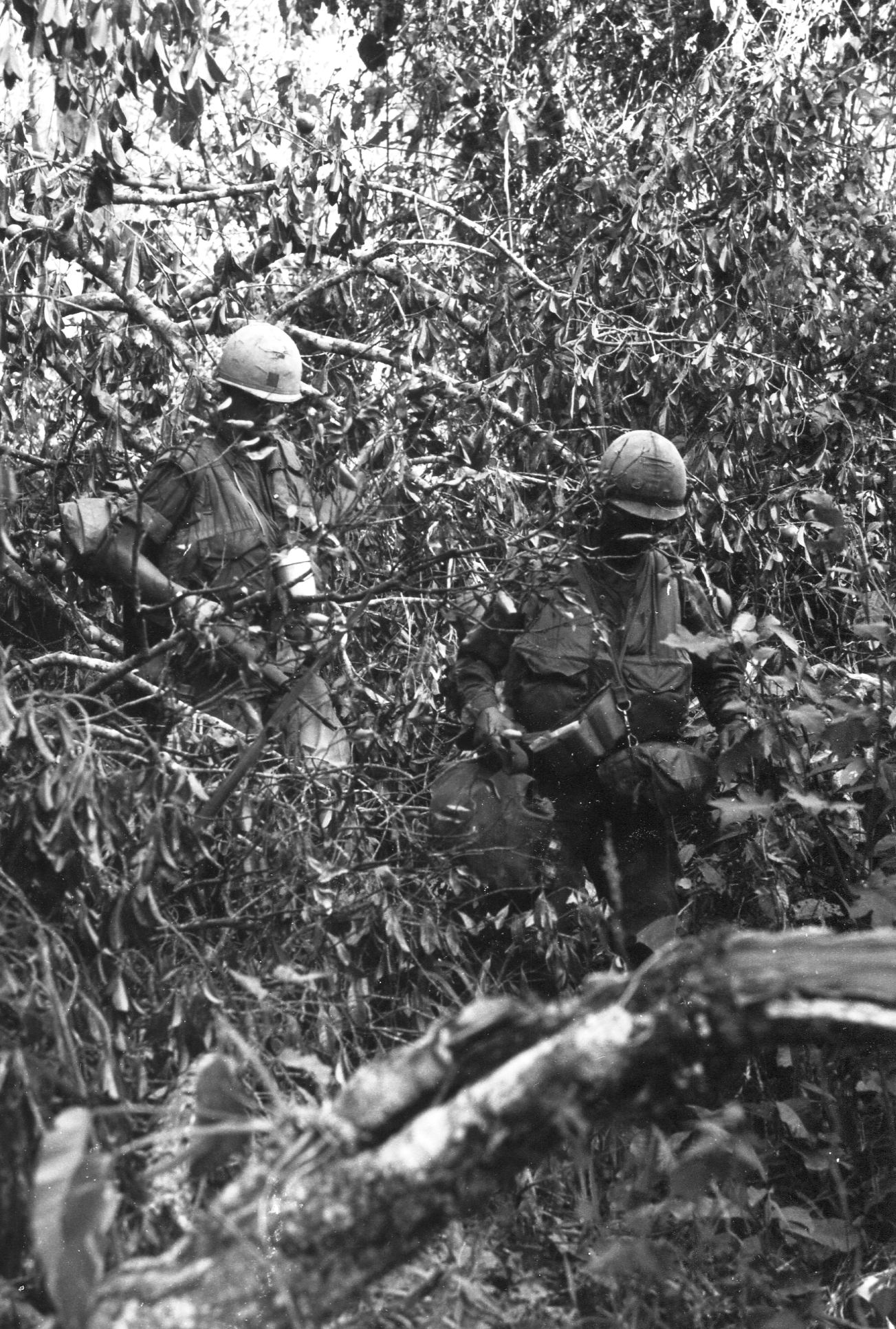
Infantry from 2nd Battalion, 3rd Marines move through jungle

Due to bad weather, the helicopter deployment from Landing Zone Snapper was delayed and 2/3 Marines marched into the salient establishing Firebase Saigon (16.524°N 106.703°E) overlooking Route 616. On 17 March Battery A 1st Battalion 12th Marines was landed at Firebase Saigon and Companies G and H began patrolling southwest onto Route 616.

On 18 March Company G ambushed two PAVN supply trucks on Route 616 killing more than 7 PAVN. On 19 March Task Force Remagen set out west along Route 9, while 1/3 Marines was landed by helicopter at Firebase Saigon and then began patrolling southwest supported by 2 M50 Ontos. 2/3 Marines continued patrolling Route 616 engaging several PAVN squads in brief firefights and on 20 March the PAVN ambushed a Company H water detail killing 3 Marines and wounding 15. On 21 March near the site of the previous day's ambush Company H discovered a PAVN staging area including over 350 tons of rice, 7000 pounds of salt and large stocks of ammunition.

2/3 Marines continued patrolling the Route 616 area encountering few PAVN but finding additional storage sites, prisoner interrogation confirmed that the area was only lightly defended by supply units and recently infiltrated soldiers. In early April the PAVN began firing rockets and artillery on the salient from positions in Laos causing limited damage as the Marines had already begun to leave the area. On 6 April control of Task Force Remagen passed from the Marines back to the Army which began operations on the Khe Sanh plateau and later the 3rd Battalion, 2nd ARVN Regiment which had been based at Landing Zone Torch (16.524°N 106.787°E) east of Landing Zone Saigon was lifted back to Đông Hà Combat Base. The Marines moved south from the salient into the Đa Krông Valley where they patrolled with no significant contacts for a further 2 weeks before being redeployed to the central DMZ for Operation Virginia Ridge.

== Aftermath ==
Operation Maine Crag concluded on 2 May, in addition to the loss of large quantities of weapons and supplies the PAVN had lost 207 killed.
