= An Long, Ho Chi Minh City =

An Long Xã An Long
- Commune
- Interactive map of An Long
- Coordinates: 11°21′39″N 106°41′34″E
- Country: Vietnam
- Municipality: Ho Chi Minh City
- Established: June 16, 2025

Area
  - Total: 38.63 sq mi (100.05 km^{2})

Population (2024)
  - Total: 17,906
  - Density: 463.53/sq mi (178.97/km^{2})
- Time zone: UTC+07:00 (Indochina Time)
- Administrative code: 25867

An Long (Vietnamese: Xã An Long) is a commune of Ho Chi Minh City, Vietnam. It is one of the 168 new wards, communes and special zones of the city following the reorganization in 2025.

== History ==
On June 16, 2025, the National Assembly Standing Committee issued Resolution No. 1685/NQ-UBTVQH15 on the arrangement of commune-level administrative units of Ho Chi Minh City in 2025 (effective from June 16, 2025). Accordingly, the entire land area and population of An Linh, Tân Long and An Long communes of the former Phú Giáo district will be integrated into a new commune named An Long (Clause 141, Article 1).
