= An Long =

An Long may refer to the following places in Vietnam:

- An Long, Ho Chi Minh City, commune in Ho Chi Minh City, formerly a commune in the former Phú Giáo district
- An Long, Đồng Tháp, commune in Đồng Tháp province, formerly a commune of Tam Nông district
