= An Xuyên province =

Historic province of South Vietnam

Coordinates: 9.2315°N 105.1804°E

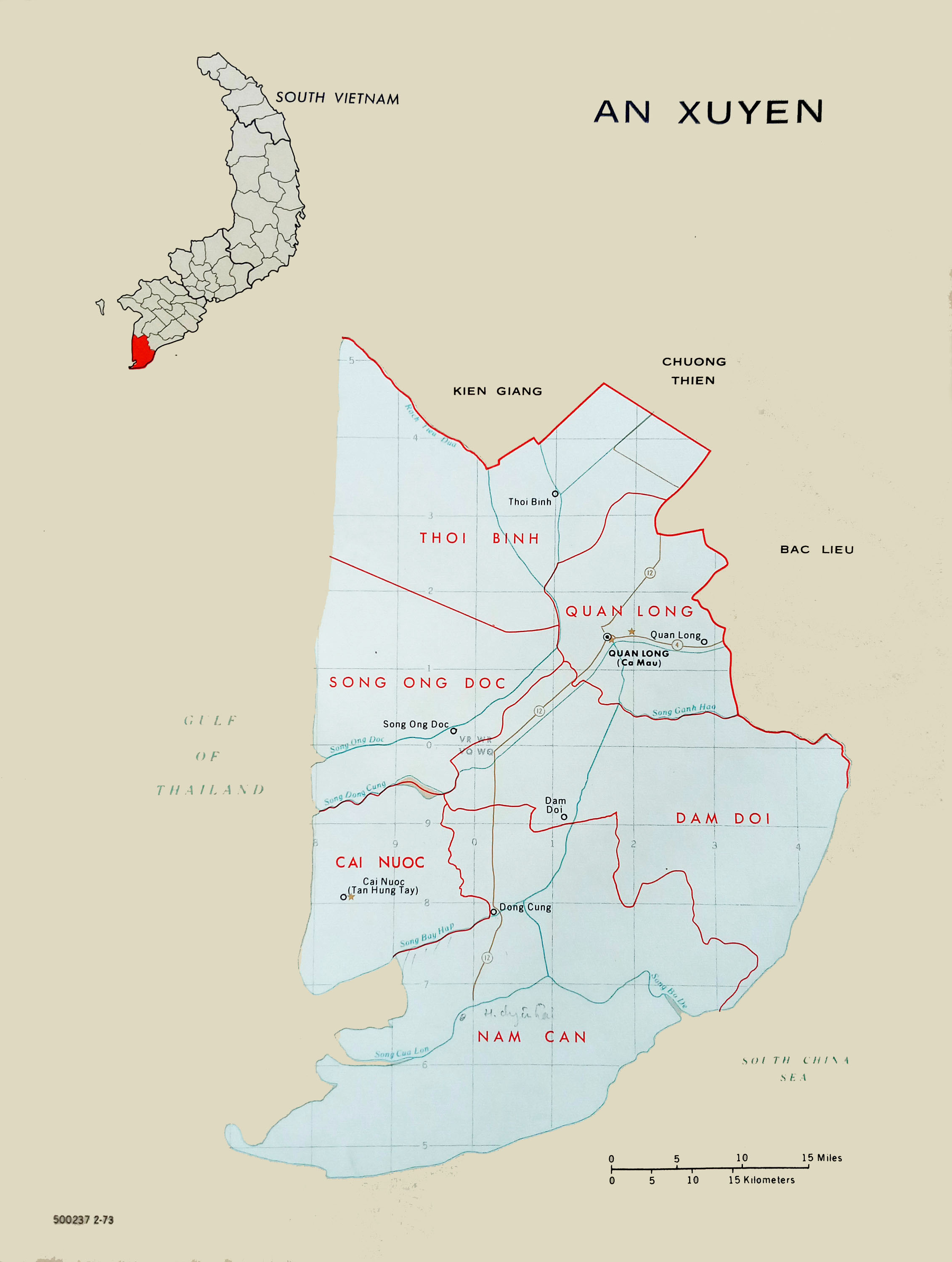

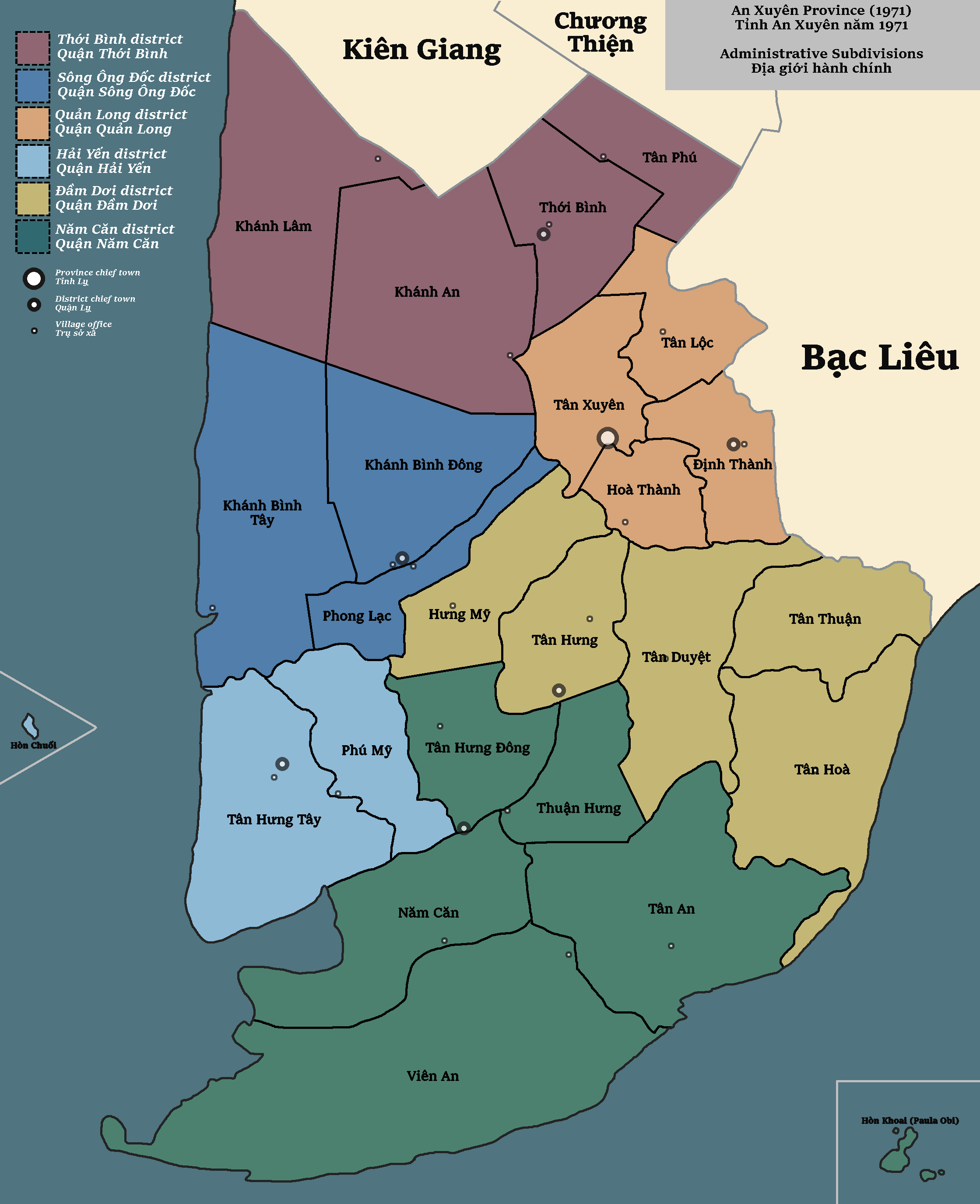

An Xuyên (chữ Hán: 安川) was a province on the Mekong Delta in during the Republic of Vietnam. On October 22, 1956, Cà Mau province was renamed to An Xuyên. Its capital was Quản Long. On May 8, 1957, it had 6 districts and 23 communes. In February 1976 it was merged with part of Bạc Liêu province to establish Minh Hải province.

== Districts ==
- Quản Long
- Cái Nước
- Đầm Dơi
- Thới Bình
- Năm Căn
- Sông Ông Đốc
