= Đa Krông district =

Đakrông District Huyện Đakrông
- District
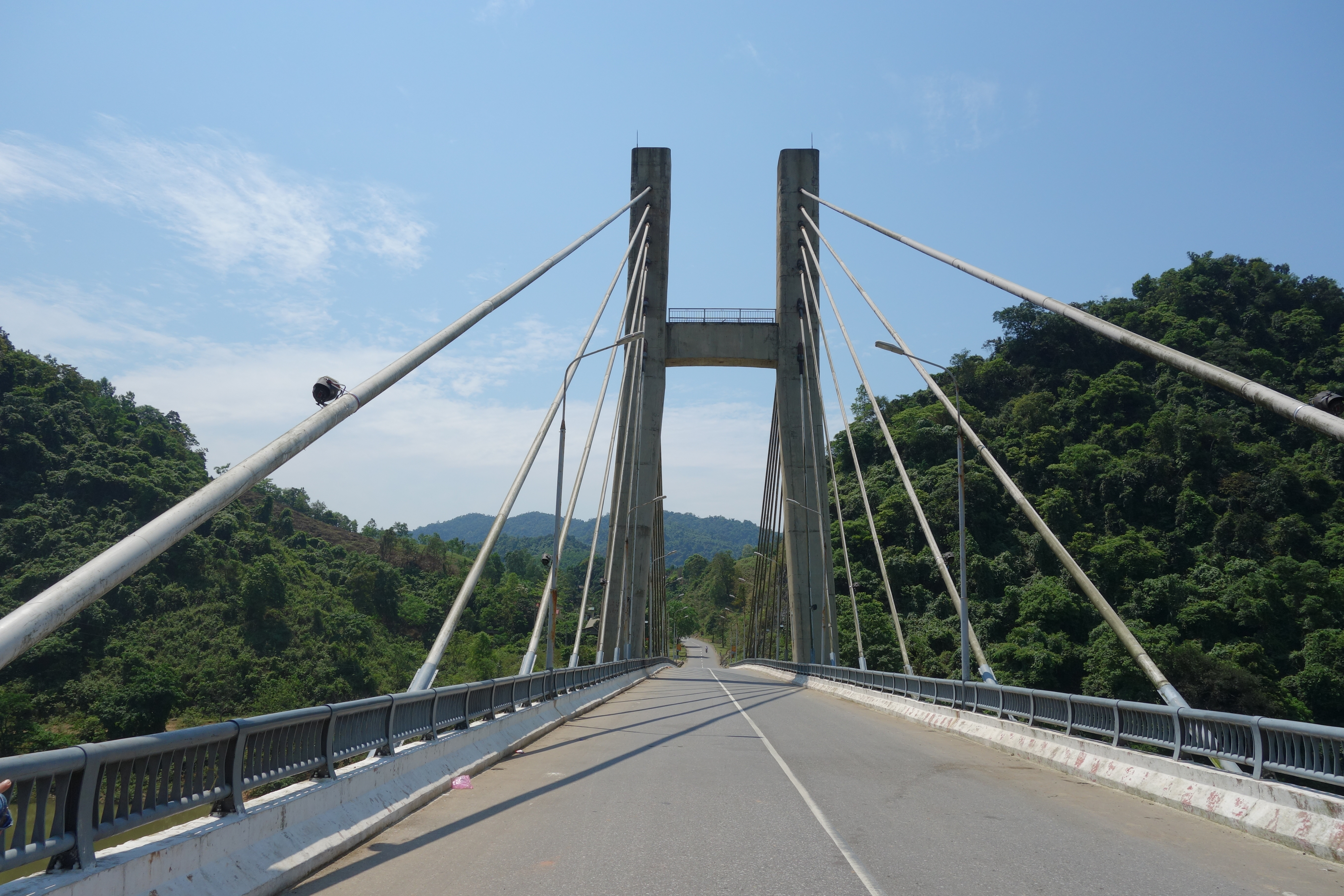
- Dakrong Bridge

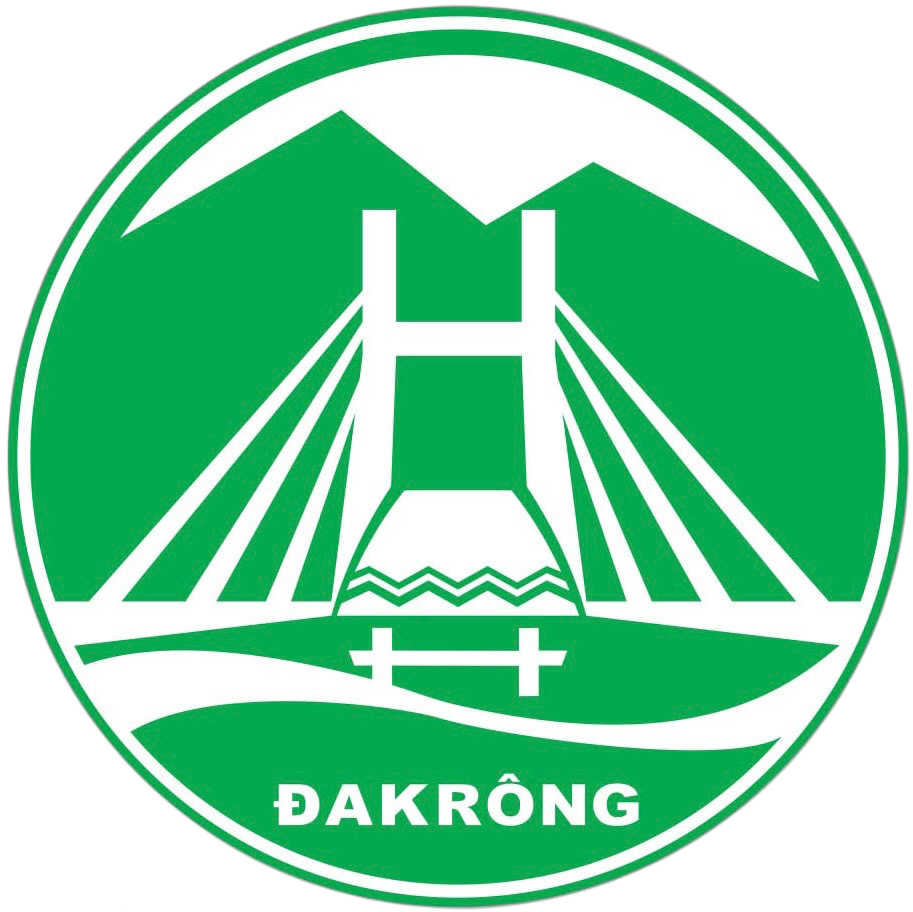
- Seal
- Interactive map of Đakrông District
- Coordinates: 16°34′N 106°56′E
- Country: Vietnam
- Region: North Central Coast
- Province: Quảng Trị
- Capital: Krông Klang

Area
  - Total: 472 sq mi (1,223 km^{2})

Population (2003)
  - Total: 31,529
- Time zone: UTC+07:00 (ICT)

Đakrông ( ; means The big river) is a rural district of Quảng Trị province in the North Central Coast region of Vietnam. As of 2003 the district had a population of 31,529. The district covers an area of 1,223 km^{2} (472 sq mi). The district capital lies at Krông Klang.
