= 1st Battalion, 12th Marines =

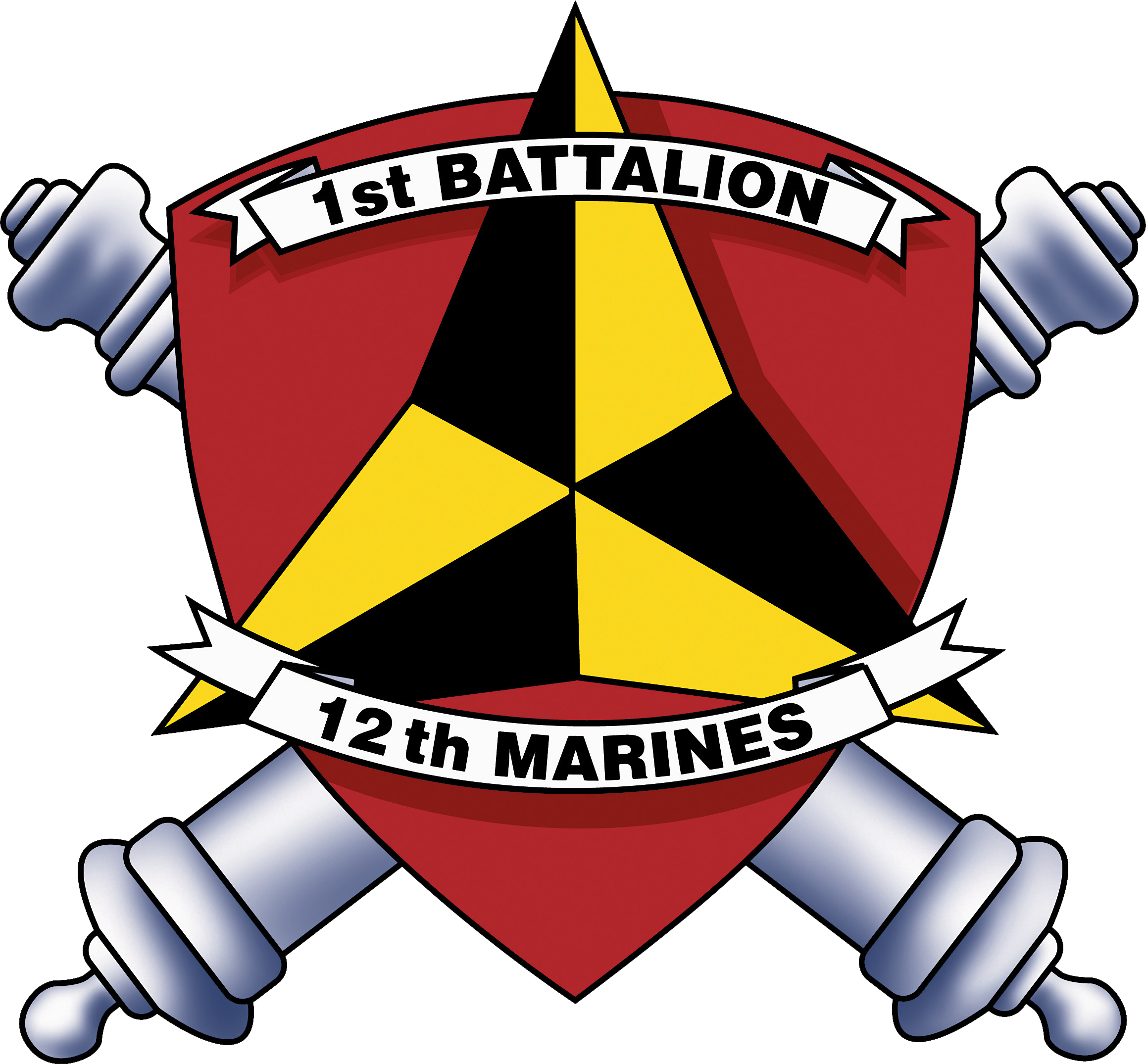
- 1/12 Insignia
- Active: 1 September 1942 –26 May 2023
- Country: United States of America
- Branch: United States Marine Corps
- Type: Artillery
- Role: Provide fires in support of 3rd Marine Regiment
- Part of: 12th Marine Regiment; 3rd Marine Division
- Garrison/HQ: Marine Corps Base Hawaii
- Nickname: "Kings of Battle"
- Engagements: World War II: Battle of Bougainville; Battle of Guam; Battle of Iwo Jima; Vietnam War; Operation Desert Storm; War on terror: Operation Iraqi Freedom; Operation Enduring Freedom

Commanders
- Current commander: LtCol Joseph L. Gill II

== Mission ==
Provide direct support of the 3rd Marine Regiment in time of conflict. That support may come in the traditional fashion of artillery support to maneuver forces, or by providing batteries to serve as provisional rifle companies. They also have the secondary mission of being the primary providers of civil-military operations (CMO). CMO is defined as the activities of the commander that establish, maintain, influence, or exploit relations between military organizations, Government and civilian organizations and the civilian populace.

== Units ==
- Headquarters Battery
- Battery A (Alpha Battery)
- Battery B (Bravo Battery)
- Battery C (Charlie Battery)
- Battery K ( Kilo Battery)

== History ==
=== World War II ===
1st Battalion, 12th Marines came into existence during World War II. The battalion was activated 1 September 1942, at San Diego, California as the 4th Battalion, 12th Marines and assigned to the 3rd Marine Division.

During October 1942, the battalion relocated to Camp Dunlap, California. They were deployed to Auckland, New Zealand during March 1943, then redeployed during July 1943 to Guadalcanal. During this period, the battalion was heavily involved in numerous campaigns including the Battle of Bougainville, Battle of Guam and the Battle of Iwo Jima.

After being re-designated on 5 April 1945 as 1st Battalion, 12th Marines, the battalion was relocated during December 1945 to Camp Pendleton, California and as deactivated on 8 January 1946.

=== 1950s through the 1980s ===
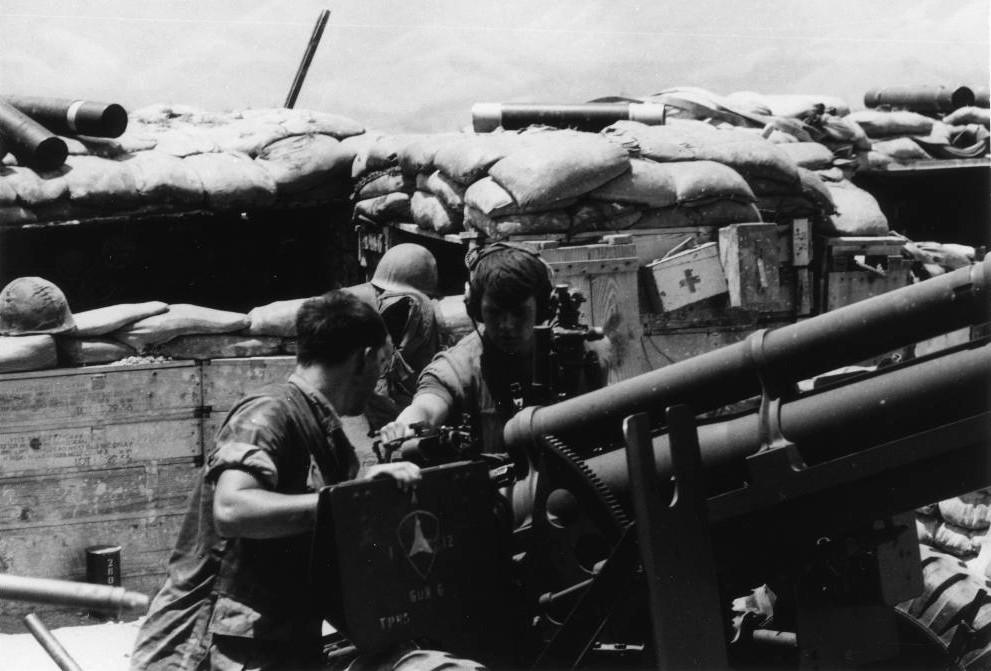
Battery A, 1/12 Marines prepare to fire their M101 at Firebase Fuller, January 1969

Five years later, the battalion was reactivated on 20 June 1951 at Camp Pendleton, California and was assigned to the 3rd Marine Division. In August 1953, 1st Battalion, 12th Marines deployed to Camp Mcnair, Japan and redeployed to South Camp Fuji, Japan during March 1956. During March and April 1965, the battalion was called upon to deploy to the Republic of Vietnam. They participated in the Vietnam War from April 1965 to September 1969, operating from Phu Bai, Danang, Cam Lộ, Khe Sanh and Camp Carroll. The battalion after the Vietnam war was reduced to cadre status.

During October 1969, the battalion was re-established at Camp Pendleton, California and assigned to the 5th Marine Division. One year later, in November 1969, they were reassigned to the 5th Marine Expeditionary Brigade.

In April 1971, the 1/12 was reassigned to the 1st Marine Division. The battalion deployed in June 1971 to Kaneohe Bay, Hawaii and was later reassigned to the 1st Marine Brigade. During the 1970s and 1980s, the unit participated in numerous training exercises to remain combat ready. 1st Marine Brigade re-designated on 30 August 1985 as the 1st Marine Amphibious Brigade. In the years that followed, 1st Marine Amphibious Brigade was re-designated as the 1st Marine Expeditionary Brigade.

=== 1990s & the global war on terrorism ===
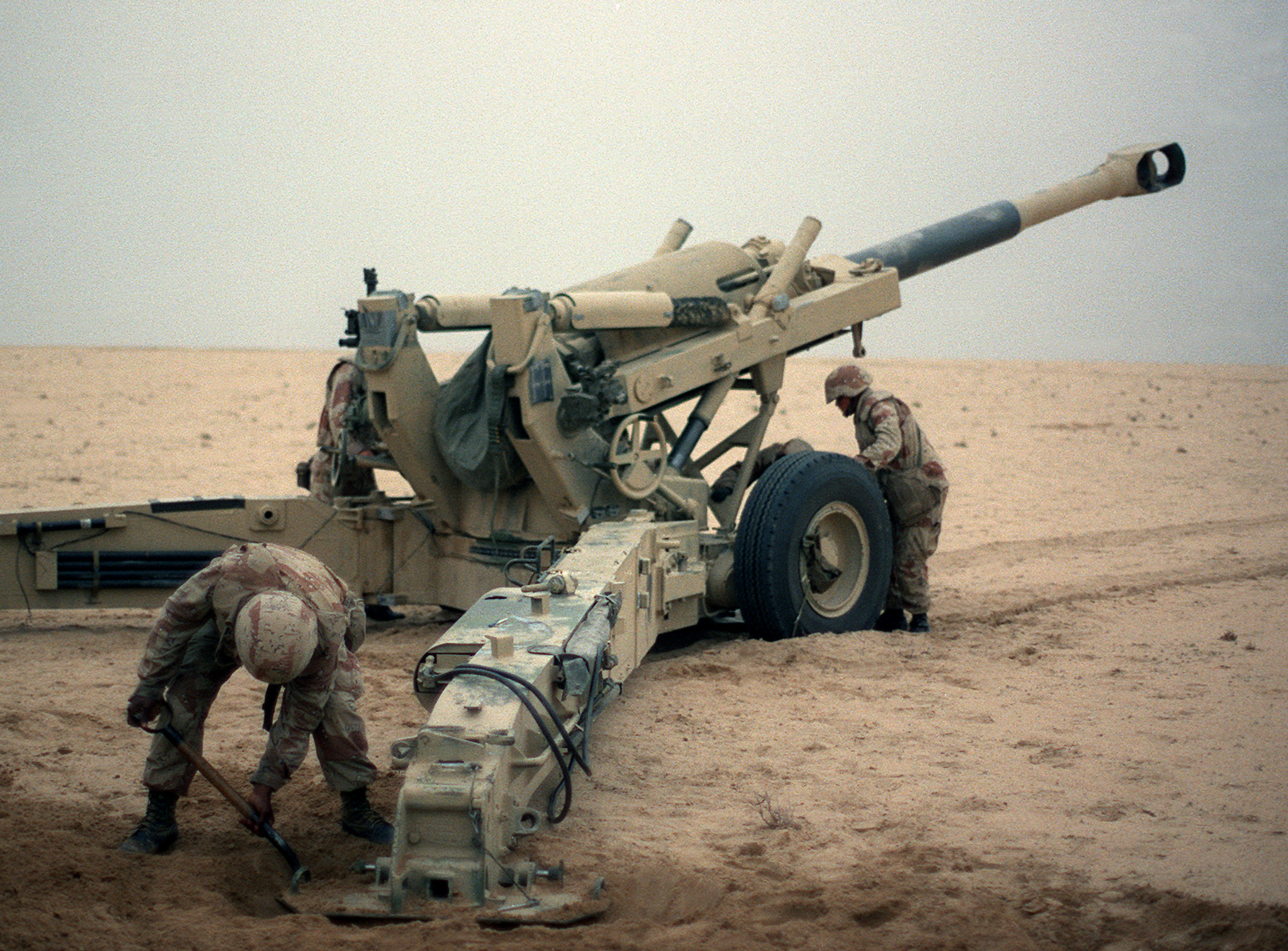
Artilleryman of 1/12 during Battle of Khafji

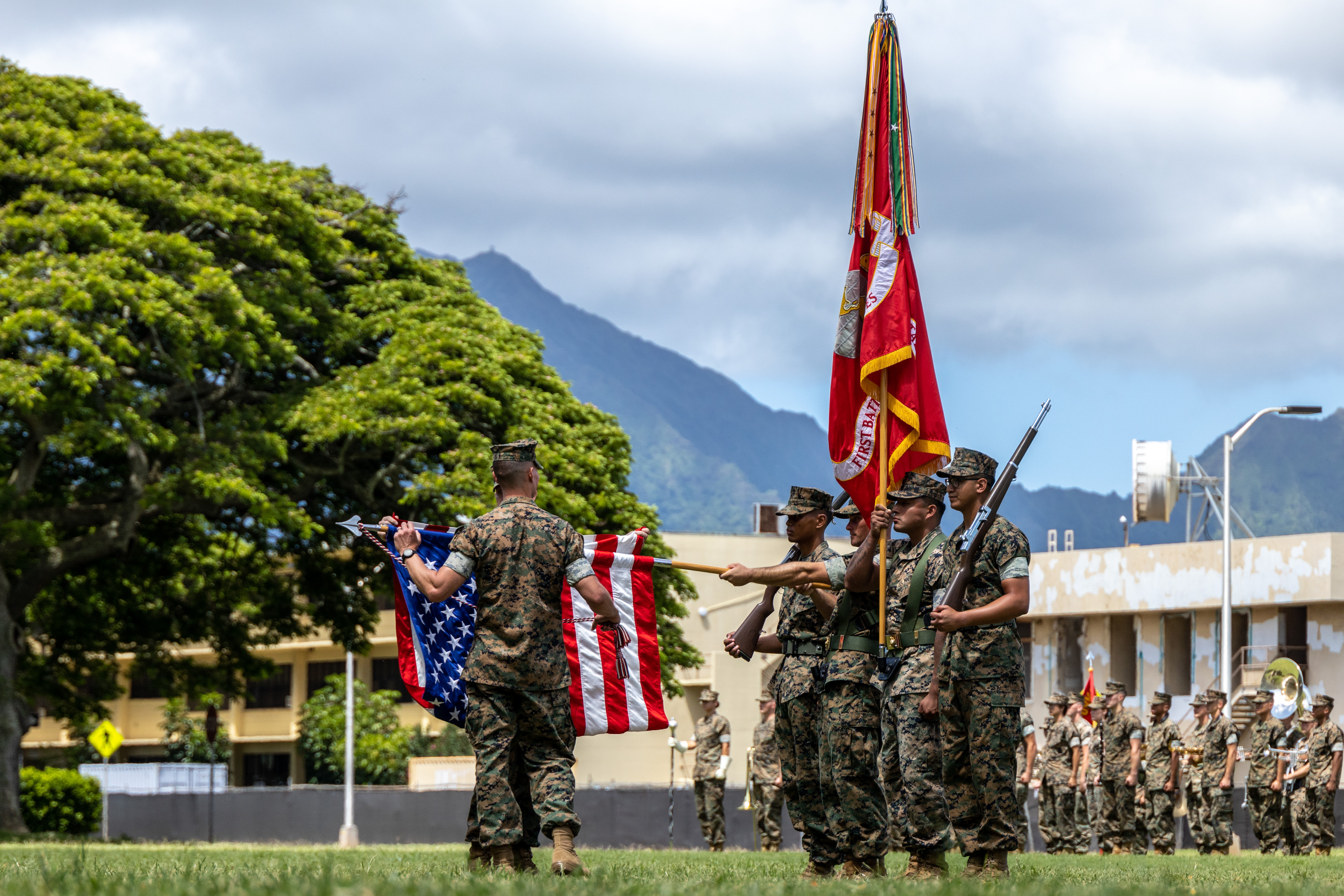
Casing the colors of 1/12 Marines during its deactivation ceremony at Marine Corps Base Hawaii

1st Battalion, 12th Marines participated in Operation Desert Shield and Operation Desert Storm in Southwest Asia during September 1990 to April 1991. In September 1994, the battalion was reassigned to 3rd Marine Division as part of the III Marine Expeditionary Force, Hawaii.

From July 2004 through April 2005, Charlie Battery, 1st Battalion, 12th Marines, deployed in support of Operation Iraqi Freedom. They were attached to 1st Battalion, 3rd Marines and deployed to Fallujah, Iraq participating in Operation Phantom Fury.

From March 2007 through October 2007 and September 2008 through April 2009, 1st Battalion 12th Marines conducted the provisional mission of Task Force MP operating in the Al Anbar province of Iraq.

In April 2011, Charlie, Alpha and Headquarters and Service Battery of 1/12 deployed to Helmand Province, with Echo Battery of 2/12 deployed to Outpost Shrine in Kajaki, Afghanistan to replace 1st Battalion, 10th Marines as the main artillery unit in the area. Bravo Battery remained in garrison for live fire during training exercises.

2nd Battalion 12th Marines was deactivated following Operation: Desert Storm due to defense cut-backs and the relocation of 12th Marine Regiment from Camp Foster to Camp Hansen, both in Okinawa. 3rd Battalion maintains its headquarters at Camp Hansen and sources the Unit Deployment Program as the headquarters element for deployed artillery batteries drawn from across the Corps. 3/12's permanent firing batteries have been reassigned to other units: Battery K to 2nd Battalion 11th Marines, Battery L to 3rd Battalion, 11th Marines, and Battery I to 1st Battalion, 11th Marines.

The battalion was deactivated at Marine Corps Base Hawaii on 26 May 2023.

== See also ==
- List of United States Marine Corps battalions
- Organization of the United States Marine Corps

Smith, Charles R. (Charles Richard). A Brief History of the 12th Marines. Washington, D.C: Historical Division, Headquarters, U.S. Marine Corps, 1972. Print.

Loewenson, Irene. “Historic Marine Artillery Battalion Deactivates on Hawaii,” June 5, 2023. https://www.marinecorpstimes.com/news/your-marine-corps/2023/06/05/historic-marine-artillery-battalion-deactivates-on-hawaii/.
