= Khe Sanh =

District capital of Hướng Hoá District, Vietnam

- Commune
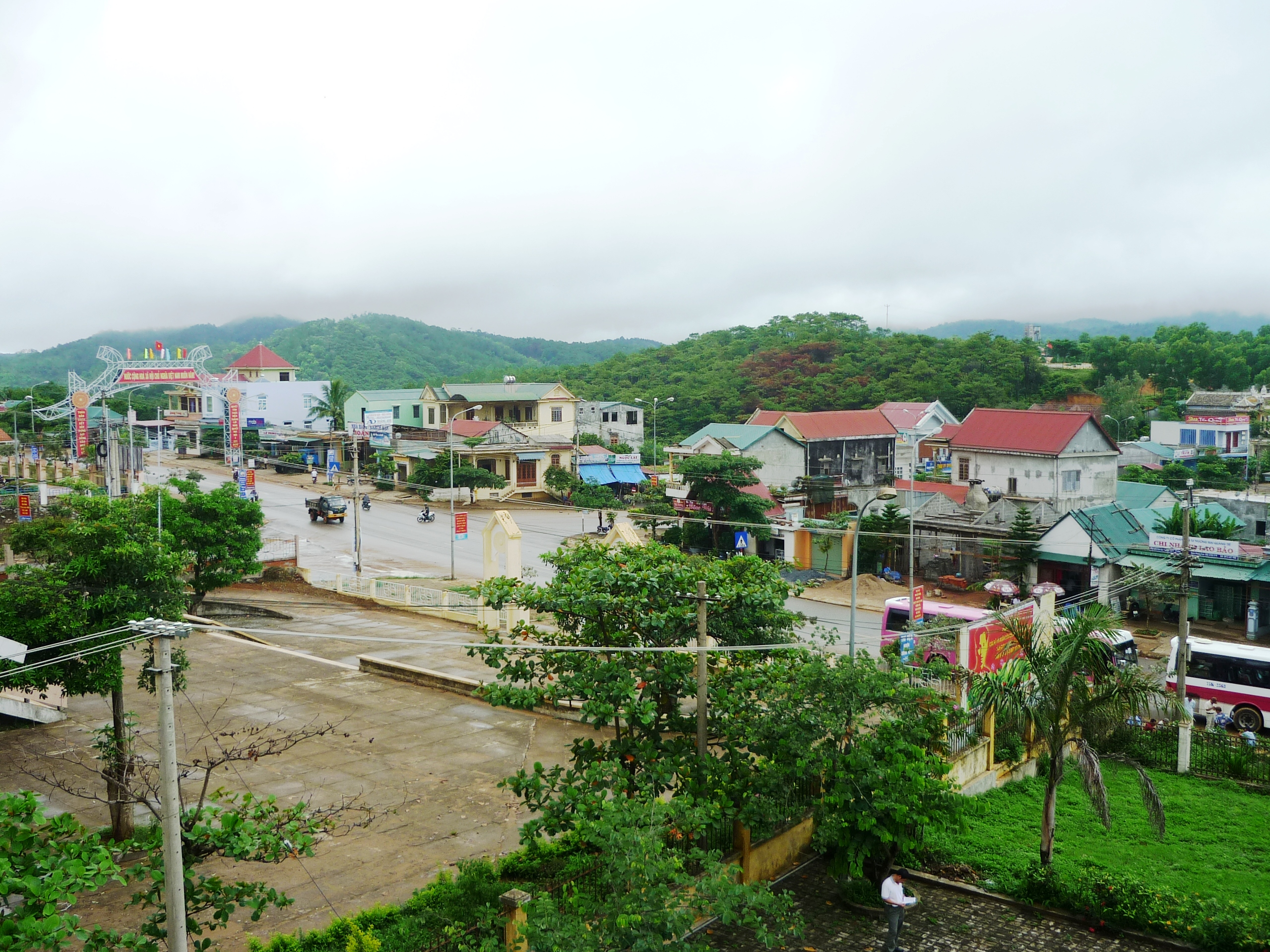
- Khe Sanh in 2010

- Location within Vietnam
- Coordinates: 16°37′9.51″N 106°43′49.83″E
- Country: Vietnam
- Region: North Central Coast
- Province: Quảng Trị

Population
  - Total: 13,927
- Time zone: UTC+07:00 (ICT)

Khe Sanh (Vietnamese pronunciation: [kʰɛ1 saɲ1]) is the commune of Quảng Trị Province, Vietnam, located 63 km west of Đông Hà.

During the Vietnam War, the Khe Sanh Combat Base was located to the north of the city. The Battle of Khe Sanh took place there. The former airstrip is now an open-air museum where relics of the war are exhibited. Most of the former base is now overgrown by wilderness or coffee and banana plants.

== Climate ==
Climate data for Khe Sanh, elevation 367 m (1,204 ft)
Month	Jan	Feb	Mar	Apr	May	Jun	Jul	Aug	Sep	Oct	Nov	Dec	Year
Record high °C (°F)	33.2 (91.8)	35.7 (96.3)	38.1 (100.6)	39.8 (103.6)	38.7 (101.7)	38.0 (100.4)	35.5 (95.9)	34.8 (94.6)	34.3 (93.7)	38.1 (100.6)	37.2 (99.0)	32.3 (90.1)	39.8 (103.6)
Mean daily maximum °C (°F)	22.1 (71.8)	23.9 (75.0)	27.5 (81.5)	30.9 (87.6)	31.5 (88.7)	30.4 (86.7)	29.6 (85.3)	29.1 (84.4)	28.9 (84.0)	26.9 (80.4)	24.2 (75.6)	21.7 (71.1)	27.2 (81.0)
Daily mean °C (°F)	18.1 (64.6)	19.2 (66.6)	21.8 (71.2)	24.6 (76.3)	25.9 (78.6)	25.9 (78.6)	25.4 (77.7)	25.0 (77.0)	24.4 (75.9)	23.1 (73.6)	21.0 (69.8)	18.5 (65.3)	22.7 (72.9)
Mean daily minimum °C (°F)	15.8 (60.4)	16.6 (61.9)	18.6 (65.5)	21.1 (70.0)	22.6 (72.7)	23.2 (73.8)	22.7 (72.9)	22.6 (72.7)	22.0 (71.6)	21.0 (69.8)	19.1 (66.4)	16.7 (62.1)	20.2 (68.4)
Record low °C (°F)	8.2 (46.8)	9.2 (48.6)	8.6 (47.5)	13.5 (56.3)	16.1 (61.0)	17.5 (63.5)	19.4 (66.9)	18.2 (64.8)	17.2 (63.0)	13.7 (56.7)	12.0 (53.6)	7.7 (45.9)	7.7 (45.9)
Average precipitation mm (inches)	18.4 (0.72)	18.4 (0.72)	38.4 (1.51)	86.8 (3.42)	159.9 (6.30)	193.6 (7.62)	223.0 (8.78)	283.2 (11.15)	376.6 (14.83)	456.8 (17.98)	197.3 (7.77)	62.8 (2.47)	2,113.1 (83.19)
Average rainy days	10.0	7.4	8.3	10.5	16.3	16.9	18.6	22.2	20.6	21.0	19.0	15.9	187.0
Average relative humidity (%)	90.2	89.7	86.0	83.3	82.9	84.4	85.9	88.6	90.0	90.6	90.7	90.5	87.7
Mean monthly sunshine hours	125.2	124.6	164.5	189.8	203.7	170.4	162.4	150.8	141.5	126.3	104.0	89.4	1,764.9
Source 1: Vietnam Institute for Building Science and Technology
Source 2: The Yearbook of Indochina (1930-1931)
