= Deaths in May 2009 =

The following is a list of deaths in May 2009.

Entries for each day are listed alphabetically by surname. A typical entry lists information in the following sequence:

- Name, age, country of citizenship at birth, subsequent country of citizenship (if applicable), reason for notability, cause of death (if known), and reference.

== May 2009 ==
=== 1 ===
- Delara Darabi, 22, Iranian convicted murderer, executed by hanging.
- Fred Delmare, 87, German actor, complications from pneumonia.
- Ric Estrada, 81, Cuban-born American comic book artist (Superman, Batman), co-creator of Power Girl, prostate cancer.
- Danny Gans, 52, American entertainer.
- Norman Gash, 97, British historian.
- Brian Grove, 88, Australian cricketer.
- Albert Hamilton Gordon, 107, American businessman.
- George Hannan, 98, Australian politician.
- Jokke Kangaskorpi, 37, Finnish footballer.
- Jack D. Maltester, 95, American politician, mayor of San Leandro, California.
- Derek Noonan, 62, British rugby league and rugby union player.
- Marc Rocco, 46, American film director (Murder in the First, Where the Day Takes You) and screenwriter.
- Sunline, 13, New Zealand champion racehorse, euthanized.
- John Wilke, 54, American investigative reporter, pancreatic cancer.

=== 2 ===
- Alfred Appel Jr., 75, American scholar, expert on Vladimir Nabokov, heart failure.
- K. Balaji, 74, Indian Tamil actor and producer, multiple organ failure.
- Augusto Boal, 78, Brazilian dramatist and theater director (Theatre of the Oppressed), respiratory failure.
- Víctor Andrés Catena, 84, Spanish screenwriter and director.
- Marilyn French, 79, American writer, heart failure.
- Eilene Galloway, 102, American space law researcher and editor, breast cancer.
- Harold Hankins, 78, British electrical engineer and academic administrator, Vice-Chancellor of UMIST.
- Kiyoshiro Imawano, 58, Japanese rock musician.
- Janus Kamban, 95, Faroese sculptor and graphic designer.
- Jack Kemp, 73, American politician and football player, candidate for Vice President (1996), cancer.
- Carole C. Noon, 59, American primatologist, founder of Save the Chimps, pancreatic cancer.
- Robert Pauley, 85, American executive, President of ABC Radio (1961–1967), heart failure.
- Virginia Prince, 96, American transgender activist.

=== 3 ===
- Bobby Campbell, 86, Scottish football player (Chelsea, Scotland) and manager.
- Robert B. Choate Jr., 84, American food lobbyist.
- Committed, 29, American thoroughbred racehorse, euthanized.
- Echo, 63-64, African bush elephant.
- John Elsworthy, 77, Welsh football player (Ipswich Town).
- Eddie Hui, 65, Hong Kong public servant, Commissioner of Police (1994–2001), cancer.
- Eleanor Perenyi, 91, American gardener and writer, cerebral hemorrhage.
- Ram Balkrushna Shewalkar, 78, Indian Marathi writer, cardiac arrest.
- Ralph Thompson, 95, British animal artist.

=== 4 ===
- Nicholas Clemente, 80, American judge (New York Supreme Court).
- Dom DeLuise, 75, American actor (The Cannonball Run, The Secret of NIMH, Spaceballs), kidney failure.
- Sir Geoffrey Foot, 93, Australian politician.
- Edward Stewart Kennedy, 97, American historian.
- Charles Lugano, 59, Kenyan politician, after short illness.
- Martha Mason, 71, American author, lived 60 years in an iron lung.
- Fritz Muliar, 89, Austrian actor.
- Jane Randolph, 93, American actress.
- Gisela Stein, 73, German actress.

=== 5 ===
- Benjamín Flores, 24, Mexican boxer, brain injury during a match.
- David S. King, 91, American politician, U.S. Representative for Utah (1959–1963).
- Richard Miller, 83, American operatic tenor and educator, Professor Emeritus of Voice (Oberlin Conservatory of Music).
- Dewey Smith, 36, American diver.
- Elsie B. Washington, 66, American author, wrote first African American romance novel, multiple sclerosis and cancer.
- Murasaki Yamada, 60, Japanese manga artist.

=== 6 ===
- Peyman Abadi, 36, Iranian actor, car accident.
- Erik Bluemel, 32, American professor (University of Denver), bicycle accident.
- Sam Cohn, 79, American talent agent, after short illness.
- Leon Despres, 101, American attorney and politician, heart failure.
- Ean Evans, 48, American bassist (Lynyrd Skynyrd), cancer.
- Sima Eyvazova, 75, Azerbaijani diplomat, first Permanent Representative to the UN.
- Kevin Grubb, 31, American NASCAR driver, suicide by gunshot.
- Sid Laverents, 100, American amateur filmmaker, pneumonia.
- Lev Loseff, 71, Russian poet and literary critic.
- Bob Meyer, 76, Australian logician, lung cancer.
- W. Wesley Peterson, 85, American mathematician and computer scientist.
- Valentin Varennikov, 85, Russian general.
- Viola Wills, 69, American pop singer, cancer.

=== 7 ===
- Robin Blaser, 83, American-born Canadian poet, Griffin Poetry Prize winner.
- Mickey Carroll, 89, American actor (The Wizard of Oz).
- Ian Cundy, 64, British Anglican prelate, Bishop of Peterborough, mesothelioma.
- Linda Dangcil, 66, American actress (The Flying Nun, Jem, The Bad Pack), throat cancer.
- John Furia Jr., 79, American screenwriter (The Twilight Zone, Dr. Kildare), President of the Writers Guild, West (1973–1975).
- Alan Gilbertson, 81, New Zealand cricketer.
- Tony Marsh, 77, British racing driver.
- David Mellor, 78, British industrial designer, manufacturer and retailer.
- Frank Melton, 60, American politician, mayor of Jackson, Mississippi.
- John Murphy, 95, Irish building contractor.
- Danny Ozark, 85, American baseball manager.
- Brian Sorenson, 79, New Zealand cricketer.
- Wayland Young, 2nd Baron Kennet, 85, British politician and writer.

=== 8 ===
- Gianni Baget Bozzo, 84, Italian Roman Catholic priest and politician.
- Fons Brydenbach, 54, Belgian athlete, cancer.
- Dom DiMaggio, 92, American baseball player (Boston Red Sox), brother of Joe DiMaggio, pneumonia.
- Hideyuki Fujisawa, 83, Japanese Go player, aspiration pneumonia.
- Carlos Kloppenburg, 89, Brazilian Roman Catholic prelate, Bishop of Novo Hamburgo (1986–1995).
- Ninel Kurgapkina, 80, Russian prima ballerina, road accident.
- Greg Palmer, 61, American writer, television reporter and Emmy Award-winning journalist, lung cancer.
- Bud Shrake, 77, American journalist and novelist, lung cancer.
- Eunice Taylor, 75, American baseball player (Kenosha Comets).

=== 9 ===
- Eileen Albright, 81, American baseball player (AAGPBL)
- Stephen Bruton, 60, American songwriter and guitarist (Kris Kristofferson band), throat cancer.
- Chuck Daly, 78, American basketball coach, pancreatic cancer.
- Travis Edmonson, 76, American singer-songwriter and guitarist (Bud & Travis), heart failure.
- Michael Fox, 75, British-born Israeli lawyer.
- Cyril Hart, 96, British forestry expert.
- Henry T. King, 89, American attorney, Nuremberg trials prosecutor, cancer.
- David Marcus, 85, Irish literary editor, after long illness.
- Ernest Millington, 93, British politician and educator, last living World War II-era member of the British Parliament.
- Eugene Smith, 88, American gospel singer.
- Evgenios Spatharis, 85, Greek shadow play artist, fall.
- Mendi Rodan, 80, Romanian-born Israeli conductor and violinist, cancer.
- Jean-Claude Van Geenberghe, 46, Belgian-born Ukrainian equestrian.
- George Zinkhan, 57, American academic and suspected murderer, suicide by gunshot.

=== 10 ===
- Ibn al-Shaykh al-Libi, 45-46, Libyan Al-Qaeda paramilitary trainer accused of terrorism, alleged suicide.
- Robert John Cornell, 89, American politician and Roman Catholic priest, U.S. Representative from Wisconsin (1975–1979).
- Ronald Easterbrook, 78, British criminal.
- Sergio Escobedo, 78, Mexican Olympic modern pentathlete and fencer.
- Roger Guilhem, 84, French rugby league player (national team).
- Johnnie Johnson, 91, English cricketer.
- James Kirkup, 91, British poet, translator and travel writer, stroke.
- Rodrigo Rosenberg Marzano, 47, Guatemalan lawyer, shot.
- Brian Simnjanovski, 27, American football player (Berlin Thunder), car accident.
- Robert J. Sinclair, 77, American executive, CEO of Saab-Scania of America, cancer.

=== 11 ===
- Pat Booth, 66, British model and writer, cancer.
- Lude Check, 91, Canadian ice hockey player.
- Abel Goumba, 82, Central African politician, Prime Minister (1957–1958, 1959, 2003) and vice-president (2003–2005).
- Claudio Huepe, 69, Chilean politician and diplomat, heart attack.
- Bill Kelso, 69, American baseball player.
- Roy Kline, 93, Australian footballer.
- Mark Landon, 60, American actor, adopted son of Michael Landon.
- Shanthi Lekha, 79, Sri Lankan actress.
- António Lopes dos Santos, 92, Portuguese general, Governor of Macau (1962–1966), Cape Verde (1969–1974).
- Sardarilal Mathradas Nanda, 93, Indian admiral, Chief of Naval Staff (1970–1973).
- Peter Philips, 81, Australian politician, Member of the New South Wales Legislative Council (1976–1988).
- Sir Richard Posnett, 89, British colonial administrator, Governor of Belize (1972–1976) and Bermuda (1981–1983).
- Leonard Shlain, 71, American surgeon and writer, brain cancer.

=== 12 ===
- Christopher Bathurst, 3rd Viscount Bledisloe, 74, British aristocrat and politician, heart failure.
- Dame Heather Begg, 76, New Zealand operatic soprano, leukemia.
- Mohan Ellawala, 61, Sri Lankan politician, Governor of Sabaragamuwa Province (2008–2009), after long illness.
- Eden Ross Lipson, 66, American book editor, pancreatic cancer.
- Thomas Nordseth-Tiller, 28, Norwegian screenwriter (Max Manus), cancer.
- Roger Planchon, 77, French theatre director, heart attack.
- Sidique Ali Merican, 78, Malaysian sprinter, stroke.
- Ted Sampley, 63, American POW/MIA activist, complications from heart surgery.
- Antonio Vega, 51, Spanish pop singer-songwriter (Nacha Pop), pneumonia.
- Heini Walter, 81, Swiss racing driver.

=== 13 ===
- Frank Aletter, 83, American character actor (It's About Time), cancer.
- Ron Cameron, 85, Canadian Olympic rower.
- Waldemar Levy Cardoso, 108, Brazilian Field Marshal, WWI-era veteran.
- Achille Compagnoni, 94, Italian mountaineer, first person to ascend K2.
- Don Cordner, 87, Australian footballer.
- Rafael Escalona, 81, Colombian Vallenato composer and troubador.
- Norbert Eschmann, 75, Swiss footballer.
- Ernest Kline, 79, American politician, Lieutenant Governor of Pennsylvania (1971–1979).
- Iwan Schmid, 61, Swiss Olympic cyclist.
- Anne Scott-James, 96, British journalist and author, widow of Sir Osbert Lancaster.
- L. William Seidman, 88, American public servant, Chairman of the FDIC (1985–1991), after short illness.
- Joe Tandy, 26, British auto racing team owner, car crash.

=== 14 ===
- Barathea, 19, Irish racehorse, euthanized.
- Monica Bleibtreu, 65, Austrian actress, screenwriter and drama teacher, cancer.
- Bob Boyd, 81, American football player.
- Newt Heisley, 88, American commercial artist, designer of POW/MIA flag, after long illness.
- Ken Hollyman, 86, Welsh footballer (Cardiff City, Newport County).
- Marian McDougall, 95, American amateur golfer.
- Buddy Montgomery, 79, American jazz musician, heart failure.
- William J. Passmore, 77, American jockey, complications from emphysema.
- Bob Rosburg, 82, American golfer and television color analyst, fall.
- George Williams, 69, American baseball player.

=== 15 ===
- Susanna Agnelli, 87, Italian politician and writer, Minister of Foreign Affairs (1995–1996).
- Alexander Gordon Bearn, 86, British physician.
- Broad Brush, 26, American thoroughbred racehorse, euthanized.
- Si Frumkin, 78, Lithuanian-born Holocaust survivor.
- Alan Hackney, 84, British screenwriter.
- Mordechai Limon, 85, Israeli admiral, Commander of the Navy (1950–1954).
- Cheikh Hamidou Kane Mathiara, 69, Senegalese economist and politician.
- Rodger McFarlane, 54, American gay rights activist, first executive director of Gay Men's Health Crisis, suicide.
- Mohammad-Amin Riahi, 86, Iranian historian and literary scholar.
- Edwin S. Shneidman, 91, American suicidologist.
- Helvi Sipilä, 94, Finnish diplomat.
- Roy Talbot, 94, Bermudan calypso musician, last surviving member of original Talbot Brothers.
- Bud Tingwell, 86, Australian actor, prostate cancer.
- Wayman Tisdale, 44, American basketball player and jazz bassist, cancer.
- Hubert van Es, 67, Dutch photographer at the fall of Saigon, brain hemorrhage.

=== 16 ===
- Prospero Amatong, 77, Filipino politician, Congressman (1998–2007), Governor of Davao del Norte (1992–1998), fall.
- Antonio Chocano, 96, Guatemalan Olympic fencer and diplomat, emphysema.
- John E. Connelly, 82, American entrepreneur, founder of Gateway Clipper Fleet, heart failure.
- David Halsey, 90, British Anglican prelate, Bishop of Carlisle (1972–1989), after short illness.
- Sándor Katona, 66, Hungarian footballer and Olympic champion.
- Richardene Kloppers, 83, Namibian teacher.
- Craig G. Roberts, 78, American racehorse trainer.
- Peter Sampson, 81, British footballer (Bristol Rovers), Alzheimer's disease.

=== 17 ===
- Mohammad-Taqi Bahjat Foumani, 92, Iranian cleric, heart disease.
- Mario Benedetti, 88, Uruguayan author and poet.
- Daniel Carasso, 103, Greek-born French businessman (Groupe Danone).
- Adolf Dickfeld, 99, German World War II Luftwaffe flying ace.
- David Herbert Donald, 88, American historian, heart failure.
- Murray Hamilton, 91, Australian politician, member of the Victorian Legislative Council (1967–1982).
- Masaru Hayami, 84, Japanese public servant, Governor of the Bank of Japan (1998–2003), respiratory failure.
- David Ireland, 78, American sculptor and conceptual artist, pneumonia.
- Jung Seung-hye, 44, South Korean film producer, colon cancer.
- Sunwoo Jin, 87, Korean politician and activist.
- Guillermo Lora, 87, Bolivian revolutionary leader, liver cancer.
- Dame Patricia Mackinnon, 97, Australian community worker and philanthropist, President of the Royal Children's Hospital.
- Prakash Mehra, 69, Indian film producer and director, pneumonia and multiple organ failure.
- William Moore, 60, British loyalist paramilitary, member of the Shankill Butchers, suspected heart attack.
- Zdeněk Pospíšil, 84, Czech Olympic sprinter.
- Peter Slabakov, 86, Bulgarian actor.
- Ron Snidow, 67, American football player (Washington Redskins, Cleveland Browns), complications from Lou Gehrig's disease.
- Octavia St. Laurent, 45, American trans woman and performer.
- Al Tornabene, 86, American mobster.

=== 18 ===
- Wayne Allwine, 62, American voice artist (Mickey Mouse).
- Carole Cole, 64, American actress (Sanford and Son, Grady), daughter of Nat King Cole, lung cancer.
- Dolla, 21, American rap artist, shot.
- Sir David Hay, 92, Australian public servant, Ambassador to the United Nations, Administrator of Papua New Guinea.
- Isaipriya, 26-27, Sri Lankan journalist, killed.
- K. Pattabhi Jois, 93, Indian yoga teacher, after short illness.
- Paul Parin, 92, Swiss psychoanalyst, author and ethnologist.
- Türkan Saylan, 74, Turkish doctor, cancer.
- Lee Solters, 89, American press agent, natural causes.
- Either killed in a missile attack or shot:
  - Pottu Amman, Sri Lankan rebel, leader of the LTTE intelligence wing.
  - Balasingham Nadesan, Sri Lankan rebel, political chief of the Liberation Tigers of Tamil Eelam (LTTE).
  - Velupillai Prabhakaran, 54, Sri Lankan rebel, leader of the LTTE.
  - Soosai, 45, Sri Lankan rebel, leader of the LTTE naval wing (Sea Tigers).

=== 19 ===
- Michael Preston Barr, 82, American composer, diabetes.
- Robert F. Furchgott, 92, American biochemist, Nobel Prize winner.
- Andrei Ivanov, 42, Russian footballer.
- Knut Hammer Larsen, 38, Norwegian footballer, leukemia.
- Nicholas Maw, 73, British composer (Odyssey), heart failure.
- Clint Smith, 95, Canadian ice hockey player (New York Rangers, Chicago Blackhawks).
- Herbert York, 87, American physicist.

=== 20 ===
- John Brown Jr., 88, American Navajo code talker.
- Arthur Erickson, 84, Canadian architect (Simon Fraser University, Roy Thomson Hall).
- Lucy Gordon, 28, British actress (Spider-Man 3, The Four Feathers), suicide by hanging.
- Alan Kelly Sr., 72, Irish footballer (Preston North End, Republic of Ireland), cancer.
- Matthew Krel, 64, Russian-born Australian conductor, founder of the SBS Youth Orchestra, encephalitis.
- Randi Lindtner Næss, 104, Norwegian actress.
- Nguyễn Bá Cẩn, 78, South Vietnamese politician, Prime Minister of South Vietnam (1975).
- Simon Oates, 77, British actor, prostate cancer.
- Larry Rice, 63, American racing driver, lung cancer.
- Roslyn L. Schulte, 25, United States Air Force officer, killed in action.
- María Amelia López Soliño, 97, Spanish blogger, world's oldest blogger.
- Noel Stanton, 82, British founder of The Jesus Army.
- Paul Vinar, 69, Australian footballer.
- Ralph D. Winter, 84, American missionary (U.S. Center for World Mission), multiple myeloma and lymphoma.
- Oleg Yankovsky, 65, Russian actor, pancreatic cancer.
- Yehoshua Zettler, 91, Israeli resistance fighter (Lehi).
- Jerzy Zubrzycki, 89, Polish-born Australian sociologist.

=== 21 ===
- Ghader Abdollahzadeh, 83, Kurdish traditional musician.
- Joan Alexander, 94, American radio actress (The Adventures of Superman), intestinal blockage.
- Walter da Silva, 68, Brazilian footballer and coach, heart attack.
- Fathi Eljahmi, 68, Libyan political activist, blood infection.
- Barry England, 77, British novelist and playwright.
- Anatoli Kirilov, 42, Bulgarian football coach (PFC Spartak Varna), car accident.
- Him Mark Lai, 83, American historian, bladder cancer.
- Sam Maloof, 93, American woodworker, pneumonia.
- Rolf McPherson, 96, American evangelist, son of Aimee Semple McPherson, natural causes.
- Robert Müller, 28, German ice hockey player, brain cancer.
- K. Pathmanathan, 64, Sri Lankan politician.
- Togo Tanaka, 93, American journalist, natural causes.

=== 22 ===
- Yves Duval, 75, Belgian comics author.
- Henry Jerrim, 93, Australian bishop.
- Alexander Mezhirov, 86, Russian poet.
- Zé Rodrix, 61, Brazilian musician.
- Yeo Woon-kay, 69, South Korean actress, kidney cancer.

=== 23 ===
- Charles Donald Albury, 88, American co-pilot of the Bockscar at atomic bombing of Nagasaki, heart failure.
- Sir Derek Bowett, 82, British academic lawyer, President of Queens' College, Cambridge (1970–1982).
- Raleigh Brown, 87, American politician, state representative (Texas), heart attack.
- Lawrence Daly, 84, British trade union leader.
- Joseph Duval, 80, French Roman Catholic prelate, Archbishop of Rouen (1981–2004).
- Ken Gill, 81, British trade union leader.
- David Lunceford, 75, American football player, Alzheimer's disease.
- Nicholas J. Phillips, 75, British physicist.
- Tadeusz Pyka, 79, Polish politician.
- Roh Moo-hyun, 62, South Korean politician, President (2003–2008), suicide.
- Sir Tangaroa Tangaroa, 88, Cook Islands public servant, Queen's Representative (1985–1990).

=== 24 ===
- Jay Bennett, 45, American musician (Wilco) and songwriter, accidental drug overdose.
- Jack Lewis, 84, American screenwriter, lung cancer.

=== 25 ===
- Tajudeen Abdul-Raheem, 48, Nigerian Pan African activist, car accident.
- Billy Baxter, 70, Scottish footballer (Ipswich Town), cancer.
- Rolf Brahde, 91, Norwegian astronomer.
- Amos Elon, 82, Austrian-born Israeli author and journalist.
- John R. Guthrie, 87, American general.
- Charly Höllering, 65, German jazz musician, heart attack.
- Reg Libbis, 75, Australian rower.
- Haakon Lie, 103, Norwegian politician.
- Tomás Paquete, 85, Portuguese Olympic sprinter.
- Ivan van Sertima, 74, Guyanese-born British historian, linguist and anthropologist (Rutgers University).

=== 26 ===
- Antonio Braga, 80, Italian composer.
- Thomas Claw, 87, American WWII Navajo Code talker.
- Commanche Court, 16, Irish thoroughbred racehorse, euthanized.
- Arcangelo Ianelli, 86, Brazilian painter.
- Kaoru Kurimoto, 56, Japanese author, pancreatic cancer.
- Doris Mühringer, 88, Austrian poet and children's writer.
- Mihalis Papagiannakis, 68, Greek politician, MP, cancer.
- Michael Ross, 89, American screenwriter and director (Three's Company), complications from a heart attack and stroke.
- Ronald Takaki, 70, American sociologist, professor of ethnic studies (University of California, Berkeley), suicide.
- Marek Walczewski, 72, Polish actor.
- Peter Zezel, 44, Canadian ice hockey player (Philadelphia Flyers, Toronto Maple Leafs), haemolytic anemia.

=== 27 ===
- Ammo Baba, 74, Iraqi footballer and athletic trainer, diabetes.
- Thomas M. Franck, 77, American lawyer.
- Sir Clive Granger, 74, British economist, Nobel Prize winner for economics.
- Mona Grey, 98, British public servant, Chief Nursing Officer for Northern Ireland.
- Abram Hoffer, 92, Canadian orthomolecular psychiatrist.
- Gérard Jean-Juste, 62, Haitian political activist, after long illness.
- Carol Anne O'Marie, 75, American Roman Catholic nun and mystery novelist, Parkinson's disease.
- Sir William Refshauge, 96, Australian public health administrator.
- Paul Sharratt, 75, British-born American television producer, cancer.

=== 28 ===
- Mort Abrahams, 93, American film and television producer (Planet of the Apes, The Man from U.N.C.L.E.), natural causes.
- Terence Alexander, 86, British film and television actor (Bergerac).
- Terry Barr, 73, American football player (Detroit Lions), Alzheimer's disease.
- Manuel Collantes, 91, Filipino diplomat, Acting Minister of Foreign Affairs (1984), cardiac arrest.
- Ed Dorohoy, 80, Canadian ice hockey player.
- Carlton Forbes, 72, Jamaican-born British first-class cricketer.
- Marciano Guzman, Filipino poet.
- Roger Kaffer, 81, American Roman Catholic prelate, Bishop of Joliet.
- Luis María de Larrea y Legarreta, 91, Spanish Roman Catholic prelate, Bishop of Bilbao.
- Lenrie Peters, 76, Gambian surgeon and novelist, after short illness.
- Ercole Rabitti, 87, Italian footballer and trainer.
- Oleg Shenin, 71, Russian politician, member of the Politburo of the Communist Party of the Soviet Union (1990–1991).
- Umberto Silvestri, 93, Italian Olympic wrestler.
- Betty Tancock, 98, Canadian Olympic swimmer (1932).
- John Tolos, 78, Canadian professional wrestler, renal failure.
- Pol Vandromme, 82, Belgian literary critic and writer.

=== 29 ===
- Hank Bassen, 76, Canadian ice hockey player (Detroit Red Wings), heart attack.
- Kevin Beurle, 53, British scientist, hot air balloon accident.
- Reginald Golledge, 71, Australian-born American geographer.
- Phale Hale, 94, American politician, member of the Ohio House of Representatives.
- Ed Murray, 80, American politician, speaker of the Tennessee House of Representatives (1987–1991).
- Bill Perkins, 89, Australian footballer (Richmond).
- Steve Prest, 43, British snooker player and coach, peritonitis.
- Karine Ruby, 31, French Olympic gold (1998) and silver (2002) medal-winning snowboarder, fall.
- Matt Zabitka, 88, American sportswriter.

=== 30 ===
- Torsten Andersson, 82, Swedish painter.
- Krystyna Borowicz, 86, Polish actress.
- Luís Cabral, 78, Guinea-Bissauan politician, President (1973–1980).
- Eva Dawes, 96, Canadian bronze medal-winning Olympic high jumper (1932), stroke.
- Roberto Falaschi, 77, Italian cyclist.
- Susanna Haapoja, 42, Finnish politician, cerebral haemorrhage.
- Eric Hammond, 79, British trade unionist, General Secretary of the EETPU.
- Ephraim Katzir, 93, Israeli biophysicist and politician, President (1973–1978).
- Herma Kirchschläger, 93, Austrian widow of former President Rudolf Kirchschläger.
- Waldemar Matuška, 76, Czech singer, pneumonia and heart failure.
- Gaafar Nimeiry, 79, Sudanese politician, President (1969–1985).
- Alexander Obregón, 31, Colombian footballer, car accident.

=== 31 ===
- Martin Clemens, 94, British colonial administrator and soldier.
- Millvina Dean, 97, British civil servant and cartographer, last living passenger aboard the RMS Titanic, pneumonia.
- Brian Edrich, 86, British cricketer.
- Sir John Holland, 94, Australian engineer, construction magnate.
- Danny La Rue, 81, Irish-born British female impersonator and singer, prostate cancer.
- Vyacheslav Nevinny, 74, Russian actor, diabetes.
- Emil L. Smith, 97, American biochemist, heart attack.
- Kamala Surayya, 75, Indian writer, after long illness.
- George Tiller, 67, American physician and abortion provider, shot.
