= Kloppers =

Klopper(s) is a Dutch surname. Notable people with the surname include:

- Damien Klopper (born 1984), South African politician
- Francois Klopper (fl. 2019–), South African rugby player
- Hendrik Klopper (1902–1978), South African general
- Henning Klopper (1895–1985), South African politician
- Hester Klopper, (fl. 1990–) South African professor of global health
- Hugo Kloppers (born 1988), South African rugby union player
- Jacobus Kloppers (born 1937), Canadian organ composer and musicologist (South African descent)
- Johan Klopper (born 1972), South African former cricketer
- Junita Kloppers-Lourens, South African politician and educator
- Marius Kloppers (born 1962), South African businessman
- Neville Kloppers (born c. 1962), Zimbabwean rugby union player
- Richardene Kloppers (1926–2009), Namibian teacher
- Ronell Renett Klopper (born 1974), South African botanist
- Stefan Klopper (born 1996), South African cricketer
- Zenobia Kloppers (born 1974), Namibian actress, singer, and writer

See also:

- Heinrich Klöpper (1918–1943), German fighter pilot
