= Bart vs. Australia =

- The Simpsons episode
- Promotional card for the episode, featuring the Simpson family, a kangaroo, and a map of Australia in the background
- Episode no.: Season 6 Episode 16
- Directed by: Wes Archer
- Written by: Bill Oakley; Josh Weinstein
- Production code: 2F13
- Original air date: February 19, 1995

Guest appearance
- Phil Hartman as Evan Conover

Episode features
- Chalkboard gag: "I will not hang donuts on my person"
- Couch gag: The living room floor is a body of water and the Simpsons swim their way to the couch.
- Commentary: David Mirkin; Bill Oakley; Josh Weinstein; Wes Archer

Episode chronology
| ← Previous "Homie the Clown" | Next → "Homer vs. Patty and Selma" |
- The Simpsons season 6

"Bart vs. Australia" is the sixteenth episode of the sixth season of the American animated television series The Simpsons. It originally aired on Fox in the United States on February 19, 1995. In the episode, Bart is indicted for fraud in Australia, and the family travels to the country so Bart can apologize.

The episode was written by Bill Oakley and Josh Weinstein and directed by Wes Archer. It features cultural references to films such as Mad Max 2 and Crocodile Dundee and the 1980 disappearance and death of Azaria Chamberlain and 1994 caning of Michael Fay. "Bart vs. Australia" acquired a Nielsen rating of 9.1 and was the fourth-highest-rated show on Fox the week it aired. Phil Hartman guest stars as diplomat Evan Conover.

== Plot ==
Bart notices that the water in the bathroom sink always drains counter-clockwise. Lisa explains that water only drains clockwise in the Southern Hemisphere due to the Coriolis effect. (Note: While not noted in the episode, this is factually incorrect.) Bart makes phone calls to various places in the Southern Hemisphere to confirm this, such as Buenos Aires, Santiago, Burkina Faso (Note: Burnina Faso is not actually in the southern hemisphere), and a research station in Antarctica. When Lisa points out how expensive overseas calls are, Bart instead makes a collect call to Australia, where a boy named Tobias Drundridge answers the phone. Bart impersonates an adult bureaucrat and asks Tobias about the drains in his home; Tobias confirms his sink and toilet both drain clockwise. Frustrated, Bart asks Tobias to check his neighbors' toilets. The call takes six hours to complete, since Tobias lives in the rural locality of Squatter's Crag and Bart leaves home to play with Milhouse and forgets to hang up the phone. Homer pays for the calls without question on receiving his phone bill due to believing he may have called the numbers himself while drunk.

Three weeks later, Tobias's father, Bruno, is billed $900.00 for the phone call. Bruno calls Bart and demands payment, but Bart taunts him. Bruno tells his neighbor, Gus, of his situation. Gus, a federal Member of Parliament, reports the matter to the Prime Minister. After Bart ignores several letters from the Prime Minister and the Solicitor-General, the government of Australia indicts him for fraud. Lisa eventually discovers the letters and Bart decides to tell Marge and Homer. A U.S. State Department official named Evan Conover arrives and explains that Bart has worsened Australia–United States relations, which were already belligerent. When Marge refuses to allow the State Department to imprison Bart for five years to placate Australia, Conover settles on having Bart travel to Australia and publicly apologize to the government.

The Simpsons arrive in Australia and stay in the U.S. Embassy in Canberra. When Bart sees a sign prohibiting foreign visitors from bringing in invasive species, he leaves his pet bullfrog at the airport before it escapes, and a kangaroo puts the frog in its marsupial pouch, introducing it into the wild. The Simpsons begin to see Australia visiting a bar where Homer orders a giant beer can, a museum where Marge learns Australia was a Penal Colony before eventually visiting the Australian Parliament before Bart's public apology. Bart makes his public apology, but an unsatisfied Parliament demands Bart receive a "booting" — a kick on the buttocks with an oversize boot — as corporal punishment. Homer stops the punishment and, managing to grab the boot and put it on, threatens to "boot" the Prime Minister before Bart and Homer escape through a window and the family flees to the embassy, chased by a large, angry mob, which includes Conover. After a stand-off at the US Embassy, the two governments propose a compromise: one kick from the Prime Minister, through the gate of the embassy, with a regular wing-tip shoe. Marge protests as she tries to reason with the Australian Government but fails, and Bart, moved by the American imagery in the embassy, agrees to the punishment. However, during the punishment and before he's kicked, Bart dodges the kick, moons the Australians with the words "Don't tread on me" written on his buttocks, and hums "The Star-Spangled Banner". The outraged mob storms the embassy, and the Simpsons and the embassy staff are evacuated by helicopter. The Simpsons notice that Bart's bullfrog has reproduced, and its offspring are wreaking havoc on Australia's ecosystem and farms. They gleefully laugh, unaware a koala has stowed away aboard their helicopter.

== Production ==
The episode was written by Bill Oakley and Josh Weinstein, and directed by Wes Archer. The writing staff wanted to do an episode where the Simpson family traveled to Australia, because they thought everyone in Australia had a good sense of humor and that they "would get the jokes". The staff had previously poked fun at several American institutions on the show, and they thought it would be interesting to poke fun at a whole nation. They designed Australia and the Australian people very inaccurately and many things were completely made up for fun., The animators, however, got two Australian tourist guides to help them out with the design of the Australian landscape and buildings, as well as the US Embassy. The writers did research on the Coriolis effect for this episode. Lisa's explanation of the effect is incorrect; it affects global weather patterns and is caused by the spinning of the globe on its axis. The distances involved when a toilet or sink drains are much too small to be affected by it, whereas it very much does affect large scale phenomena such as weather cyclone spin direction.

In 1999, Fox Studios Australia in Sydney used a different version of "Bart vs. Australia" as part of their The Simpsons attraction, called The Simpsons Down Under. They had contacted the Simpsons writing staff and asked if they would write the screenplay for a ride in their attraction, based on this episode. The episode was re-edited and re-animated for the ride and new scenes were included. The attraction featured motion capture technology, allowing audience members' faces and expressions to be transformed into moving cartoon characters.

== Cultural references ==
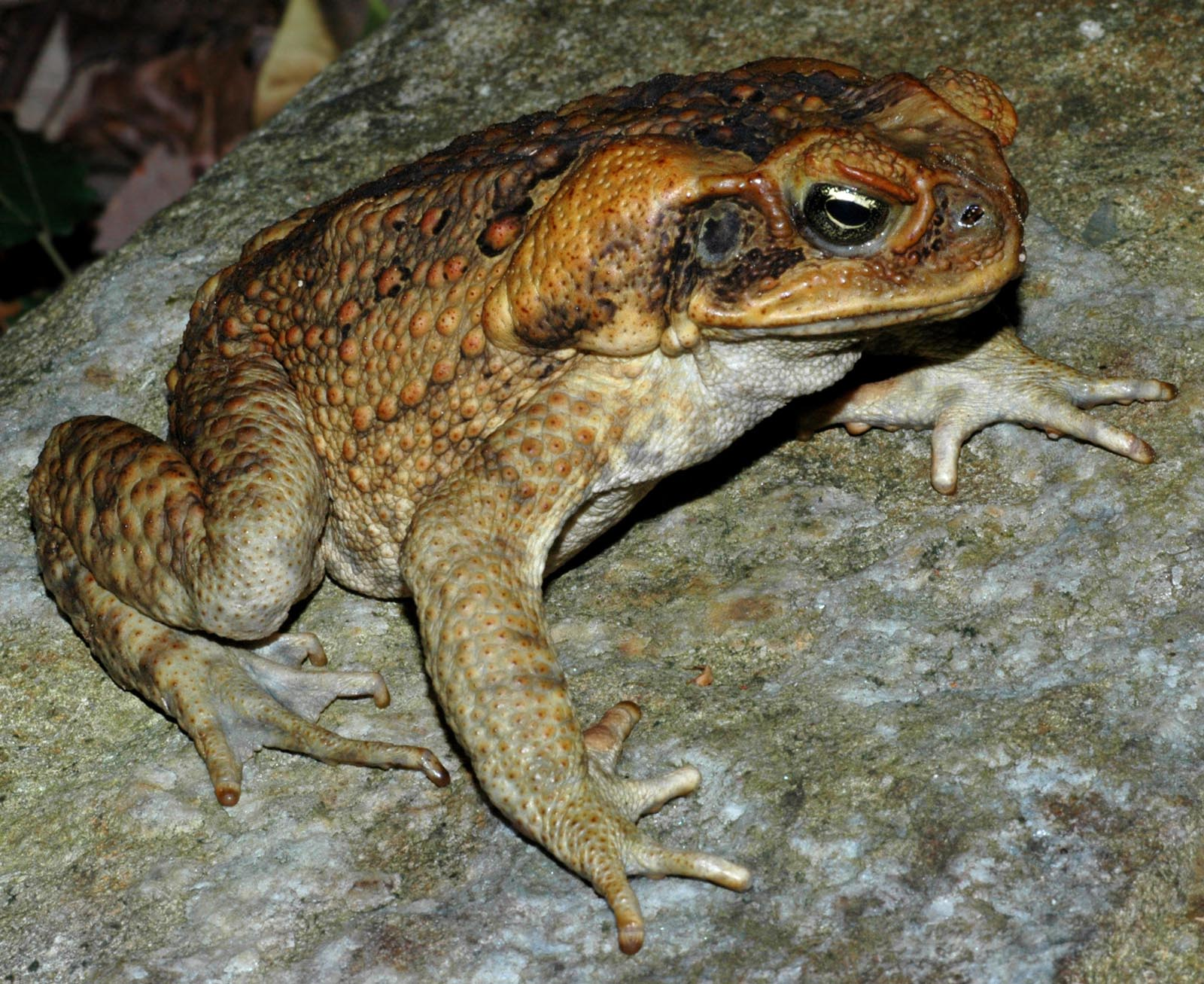
The bullfrogs taking over Australia in the episode and destroying all the crops is a reference to the cane toad that became a pest in Australia.

The plot of the episode is based on the story of Michael Fay, an American teenager who was caned in Singapore in 1994 for vandalizing cars. This episode perpetuated a popular myth that the Coriolis effect affects the motion of drains in the Northern and Southern Hemispheres. In reality, the Coriolis effect affects global weather patterns; the amount of water in a toilet or sink is much too small to be affected by it.

During the scene in which Bart calls various locations in the Southern Hemisphere, he calls a car phone belonging to a man who appears to be an elderly version of Adolf Hitler, alive in Buenos Aires, referencing the conspiracy theory that Hitler faked his death and fled to Argentina after the end of World War II.

When Bart is talking to the boy's father on the phone, he says, "Hey! I think I hear a dingo eating your baby!", referencing the death of Azaria Chamberlain, a nine-week-old baby who was killed by dingoes during a family vacation in the Australian Outback.

The bullfrogs taking over Australia and destroying all the crops is a reference to the cane toad, originally introduced to Australia in order to protect sugar canes from the cane beetle, but instead became a pest in the country.

When the Simpson family go to an Australian pub, Bart plays with a pocketknife at the table and a man asks him, "You call that a knife?", and as the man draws a spoon from his pocket he says, "This is a knife." The scene is a reference to a famous scene from Crocodile Dundee, in which Mick Dundee is threatened by some thugs with a switchblade, and Mick takes out a bowie knife and says; "That's not a knife; that's a knife!" The Simpson family is shown a slide show by the US Department of State depicting a boarded up cinema with a marquee reading "Yahoo Serious Festival", in reference to the Australian actor and director Yahoo Serious. Wez, one of the characters from the 1981 film Mad Max 2: The Road Warrior, is seen in the Australian mob that chases Bart and Homer to the US Embassy.

The gift shop that Marge and Lisa visit is a reference to South of the Border, a roadside attraction in South Carolina, close to the North Carolina border. The gift shop sign's font and posterized caricature of a man named Pedro are both taken from the actual South of the Border.

The scene where the Simpsons family and the embassy staff get evacuated via helicopter is a reference to the helicopter evacuation of the U.S. Embassy to South Vietnam during the Fall of Saigon, with one shot referencing Hubert van Es's famous photograph of USAID and CIA employees being evacuated by an Air America Huey helicopter from 22 Gia Long Street.

== Reception ==
In its original broadcast, "Bart vs. Australia" finished 56th in the ratings for the week of February 13–19, 1995, with a Nielsen rating of 9.1. It was the fourth-highest rated show on Fox that week.

Since airing, the episode has received positive reviews from fans and television critics.

In a DVD review of the sixth season, Ryan Keefer said, "all the Australian jabs you expect to have here are present. Bart's international incident is hilarious, from top to bottom. The phone calls he makes to other countries (particularly Buenos Aires) are fantastic. This is one of the more underappreciated episodes in the series' run."

Vanity Fair named it the second-best episode of The Simpsons in 2007.

"Bart vs. Australia" was also nominated for an Emmy Award in 1995 in the category "Outstanding Individual Achievement in Sound Mixing for a Comedy Series or a Special".

=== Reaction in Australia ===
The episode received a mixed reception in Australia, with some Australian fans saying the episode was a mockery of their country. Shortly after it had aired, the Simpsons staff received over 100 letters from Australians who were insulted by the episode. They also received letters from people complaining about the Australian accents used in the episode that "sounded more like South African accents". The Simpsons writer and producer Mike Reiss claimed that this episode is Australia's least favorite, and that "whenever we have the Simpsons visit another country, that country gets furious, including Australia". He claimed that they were "condemned in the Australian Parliament after the episode had aired".

The Newcastle Herald's James Joyce said he was shocked when he first saw the episode: "Who are the Americans trying to kid here? I agree Australia has its faults, as does any other country. But laughing in our face about it, then mocking our heritage was definitely not called for. It embarrassed and degraded our country as well as making us look like total idiots". Gary Russell and Gareth Roberts, the authors of the book I Can't Believe It's a Bigger and Better Updated Unofficial Simpsons Guide, advised that the episode is "best if watched with Australians who will be, perhaps understandably, aggrieved at their portrayal. After the attack on the French, this is a vicious, unkind, offensive and wonderfully amusing slaughter of Australian culture by the makers of The Simpsons."

David Mirkin, who produced the episode, responded to the criticism in an interview with The Newcastle Herald by saying: "We like to have the Simpsons, the entire family, travel and this was the beginning of that. Australia was a fantastic choice because it has lots of quirky visual things. And it's a country that is really very close to America, very in sync with America. We are so similar but yet there are all these fantastic differences, familiar yet twisted. It was intentional to make it very inaccurate. That was our evil side coming out: We'll take our knowledge of Australia and we'll twist it around to stimulate an audience and annoy them at the same time." Despite being criticised for mocking the country, the episode did receive some positive reviews from Australians, too. Jim Schembri of the Australian newspaper The Age named it the funniest episode ever.

In the episode, Tobias's father refers to Australian dollars as "dollaridoos", leading to a petition on change.org to change the name of the Australian currency to the more common spelling of the humorous word, "dollarydoos." The petition claims that the name change will stimulate the struggling Australian economy. When the petition had closed, it had received 69,574 signatures.
