= Bluemel =

Bluemel is a German surname. From a diminutive of Middle High German bluome "flower", it is a metonymic occupational name for a gardener or florist, or in some cases possibly a topographic or habitational name referring to a house distinguished by the sign of a flower. Notable people with the surname include:

- Clifford Bluemel (1885–1973), American brigadier general
- Edward Bluemel (born 1993), English actor
- Erik Bluemel (1977–2009), assistant professor at the University of Denver Sturm College of Law
- James Bluemel, British television director

== See also ==
- Blumel
