= Roy Kline =

Roy Kline may refer to:

- Roy Kline (footballer), Australian rules footballer
- Roy L. Kline, United States Marine Corps general

== See also ==
- Roi Klein, Israeli major
