= Blumel =

Blumel or Blümel is a surname, and may refer to:

- Gernot Blümel (born 1981), Austrian politician
- Gonzalo Blumel (born 1978), Chilean civil engineer and politician
- Kay Blümel (born 1963), German basketball coach
- Matěj Blümel (born 2000), Czech ice hockey player
- Mike Blumel (born 1986), American speed-skater

== See also ==
- Bluemel
