= Charly Höllering =

Charles H. "Charly" Höllering (born Karl-Heinz Höllering, 19 April 1944, Asch, Sudetenland (now Aš, Czech Republic) – 25 May 2009, Stuttgart) was a German jazz musician, notable for playing the clarinet and tenor saxophone, and graphic designer.

== Life and work ==
Höllering went into jazz as a teenager in 1958 playing in Werner Lener's Darktown Jazzband, with whom he performed at the German Amateur Jazz Festival in Düsseldorf in 1963. The study led him to West Berlin in 1964, where he belonged to the Spree City Stompers. During the first years of his professional career in Bremen, he played at the Bremen Dixieland All Stars.

After returning to Stuttgart, Höllering was active as a graphic designer and head of an advertising agency; He designed children's books covers and numerous covers of records, and was also in the field of pop music and children's plays. He also joined the Darktown Jazz Band (Mood Indigo, 1983). In addition, Höllering played for many years in various band projects of the Stuttgarter scene, such as Slick Salzer, the Chicagoans and the Dixieland Jubilee All Stars. From Swing Mail Special, with whom he also toured, the Charles Höllering Swing All Stars (which are forwarded as We Remember Charles) were created. His virtuoso performance led to numerous prizes as the best soloist at international festivals. At the Ascona Jazz Festival, he played with Lino Patruno. He had numerous national and international engagements, such as Gerhard Vohwinkel, Charly Antolini/Gerry Hayes, and the Olympian Jazz All-Stars Heiner Franz, with whom he also recorded. The Goethe Institute sent him on tours throughout European and African countries. In all, he had been involved in 25 recording sessions from 1963 to his death. On Austrian television, Höllering took over the role of the clarinetist on Fatty George for several memorials him.

As a co-founder of the Stuttgart Jazz Initiative, he has been involved, since 1999, in organizing, but also musically, in the design of the program of the Stuttgart Jazz Hall. Höllering died unexpectedly from a heart attack in 2009.

== Discography ==
- Darktown Jazzband Mood Indigo (with Klaus Osterloh, Joe Gallardo, Werner Lener, Ludwig Stimmler, Elmar Wippler; 1983)
- Swing Mail Special Along the Banks of Mainstream (with Wolfgang Trattner, Harald Schwer, Ludwig Stimmler, Dai Bowen, Joe Gallardo, Roman Schwaller; 1990)
- Charles Hollering Swingtett Dixieland Jubilee 2006 (with Thilo Wagner, Lorenzo Petrocca, Andy Streit, Gregor Beck; 2006)

== Lexical entries ==
- Jürgen Wölfer: Jazz in Deutschland. Das Lexikon Vienna: Hannibal, 2008 S. 151
