= John Brown Jr. =

John Brown Jr. may refer to:

- John A. Brown Jr. (c. 1962–1997), American murderer executed in Louisiana
- John H. Brown Jr. (1891–1963), U.S. Navy officer
- John Y. Brown Jr. (1933–2022), Governor of Kentucky from 1980 to 1984
- John Brown Jr. (Navajo) (1929–2001), American Navajo Code Talkers
- John Brown Jr. (abolitionist) (1821–1895), American abolitionist

== See also ==
- John Brown II (disambiguation)
- John Brown (disambiguation)
