= Barbara Robbins =

American secretary and CIA employee (1943–1965)

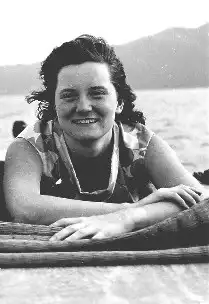
- Undated photo of Robbins
- Born: July 26, 1943; South Dakota, U.S.
- Died: March 30, 1965 (aged 21); United States Embassy, Saigon, South Vietnam
- Cause of death: Murder by car bomb
- Occupation: CIA secretary

Barbara Annette Robbins (July 26, 1943 – March 30, 1965) was an American secretary employed by the Central Intelligence Agency. She was killed in a car bombing of the United States Embassy, Saigon. Robbins was the first female employee to be killed in action in the CIA's history, the first American woman killed in the Vietnam War and, as of 2012, the youngest CIA employee to die in action.

Robbins was born in South Dakota and raised primarily in Colorado, where she received secretarial training at Colorado State University from 1961 to 1963. She joined the CIA soon after graduation, motivated by a desire to participate in efforts to combat communism. Robbins, who had not previously traveled outside the United States, volunteered for the assignment in Saigon. When asked by her father Buford, a Navy veteran, about her decision, she reportedly told him: "When they [the Communists] get to West Colfax [a Denver neighborhood], mister, you'll wish you'd done something."

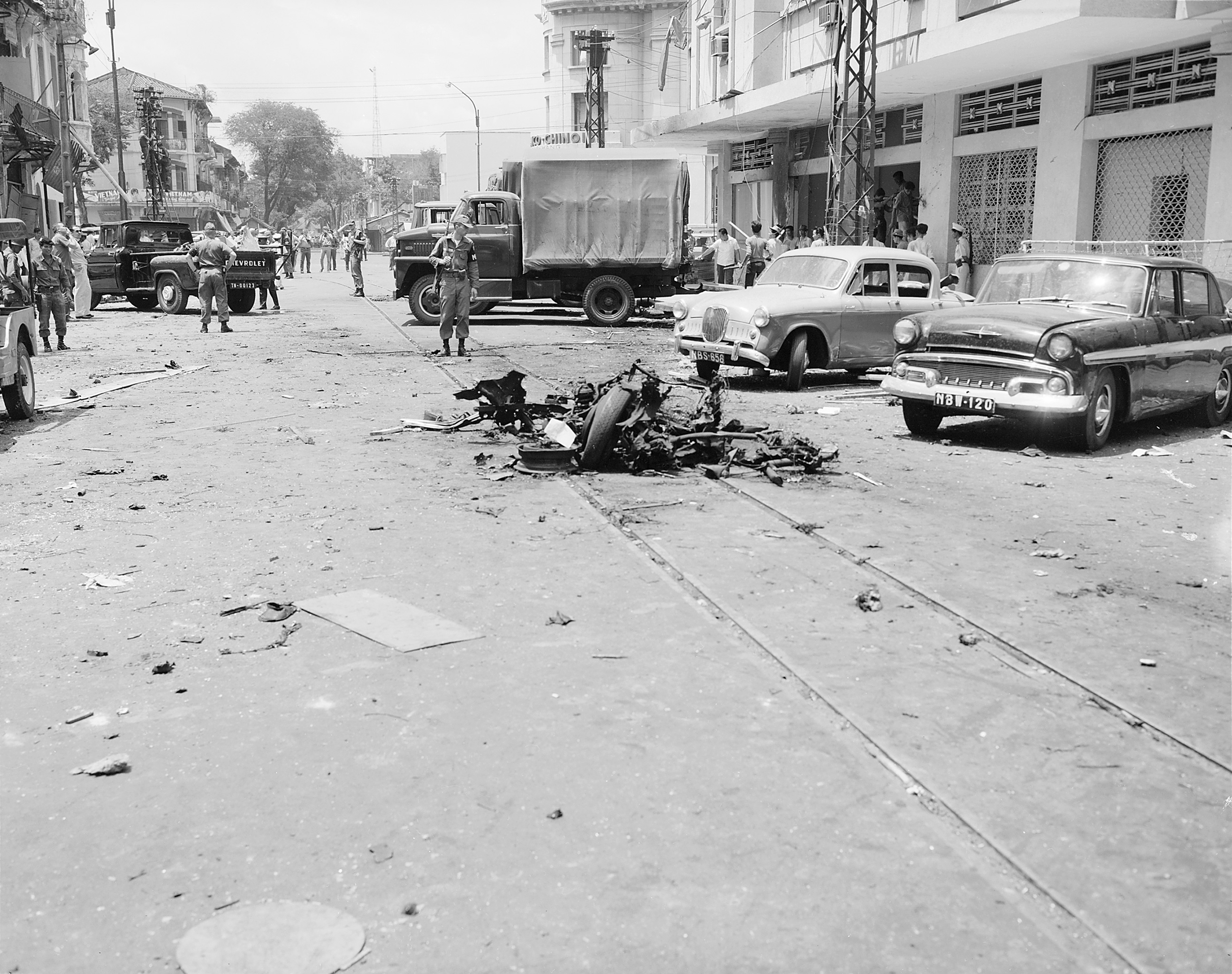
Scene of the 1965 bombing in which Robbins was killed

On March 30, 1965, a car bomb exploded outside the embassy. Before the explosion, there was a confrontation between the driver and a policeman and Robbins went to the window of her second-story office to see what was happening; she was killed instantly. A Filipino storekeeper serving in the US Navy was killed, along with 19 Vietnamese.

The CIA honored Robbins with a star on the Memorial Wall in its headquarters building in Langley, Virginia. The wall pays tribute to personnel killed while working for the agency. However, for many years the agency omitted Robbins' name from the display's Book of Honor, which lists the names of the slain employees, citing security concerns since Robbins was working under the guise of an employee of the State Department. In May 2011, CIA Director Leon Panetta announced that Robbins' name would be inscribed in the Book of Honor. Robbins was posthumously awarded the Medal of Honor First Class by South Vietnamese Foreign Minister Tran Van Do.
