= John Brown II =

John Brown II may refer to:

- John Carter Brown II (1797–1874), American book collector
- John Nicholas Brown II (1900–1979), U.S. Assistant Secretary of the Navy

== See also ==
- John Browne II (c. 1513–1570), English member of parliament
- John Brown Jr. (disambiguation)
