= Robert J. Sinclair =

Automotive industry executive

- Born: March 17, 1932; Philadelphia, Pennsylvania, United States
- Died: May 10, 2009 (aged 77); Santa Barbara, California, United States
- Other name: Bob
- Education: Lafayette College
- Occupation: CEO of Saab-Scania of America (1979–1991)
- Successor: Sten Helling
- Spouse: Anne Sinclair

Robert J. Sinclair, (March 17, 1932 – May 10, 2009) was an American automotive industry executive who was chief executive officer (CEO) of Saab-Scania of America from May 1979 until September 1991, where he helped improve the popularity of Saab's cars by convincing the parent company to manufacture cars with high-end options such as turbochargers and a convertible version of its Saab 900 designed to appeal to American consumers.

== Biography ==
Sinclair was born on March 17, 1932, in Philadelphia. As a child he helped in his father's grocery shop and attended Haverford High School in Upper Darby Township, Pennsylvania. He met the woman who was his wife-to-be while performing in an operetta there, and his plans to pursue a career as a concert pianist were cut short after his hand was injured by a meat slicer in his father's grocery store. He attended Lafayette College in Easton, Pennsylvania and later took a job selling medical equipment.

=== Career with Saab ===
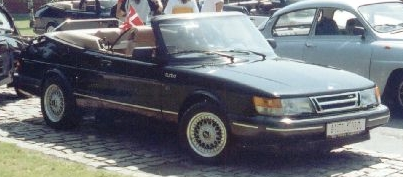
1992 Saab 900 convertible

In the late 1950s he joined Saab USA as a salesman and, after a short break working for Volkswagen and Volvo, rejoined Saab to become president of its American division in 1979. By 1983, under Sinclair's management, the 25,833 Saab vehicles sold exceeded the previous year's record-breaking sales by 42%. In lieu of the annual allotment of 1,000 two-door economy-model sedans, Sinclair pushed the parent to manufacture vehicles equipped with high-end specifications including fuel injection, turbocharger, a five-speed gearbox, and also that the car would be available as a convertible, a body style that other car manufacturers had stopped producing expecting that safety rules would ban them. The convertible came in 1986 and was a great success. Some 250,000 of the Saab 900 convertible were sold (including the NG900) over the succeeding two decades. In a 2007 interview, Sinclair stated that his approach in introducing the new vehicles was that Saab "should add content, add performance, add sparkle and luster to the brand" in order to move to a higher niche market in the United States while the firm was focusing on a "no-frills market" in Europe.

Sinclair initiated an effort to construct buses at a manufacturing plant near the firm's Connecticut headquarters in 1984, but terminated the program in the face of "low bid" contracts that made the sale of buses unprofitable.

In the 1980s, Sinclair was named a Commander of the Order of the Polar Star by Sweden's King Carl Gustav XVI, the country's highest honor awarded to non-heads of state for contributions to Sweden's economy and culture.

=== Personal ===
Sinclair was a resident of Santa Barbara, California after his retirement from Saab in 1991. He died there at age 77 on May 10, 2009, due to cancer.
