= Damien Klopper =

South African politician

Damien Klopper MP

Member of the National Assembly of South Africa
- Incumbent
- Assumed office 25 June 2024

Personal details
- Born: Damien Klopper; 27 December 1984 (age 41)
- Party: Democratic Alliance
- Spouse: Lisa
- Occupation: Member of Parliament
- Profession: Politician

Damien Klopper (born 27 December 1984) is a South African politician who has been a Member of the National Assembly of South Africa for the Democratic Alliance (DA) since 2024.

== Background ==
Klopper previously served as a DA councillor on the Steve Tshwete Local Municipality council.

In 2023, while serving as a councillor, Klopper was attacked by an armed gang while shopping with his wife and twelve-year-old daughter at an Ackermans store in Middelburg. Klopper was also armed at the time and fought back against the robbers, sustaining substantial injuries to his face and body and also causing injuries to the robbers. Klopper was described as a "hero" for his actions. The robbers were later arrested.

== Parliamentary career ==
Klopper stood as a DA parliamentary candidate on the regional list for Mpumalanga in the 2024 national elections and was subsequently elected to the National Assembly of South Africa. He was sworn in on 25 June 2024. He is a member of the Portfolio Committee on Correctional Services.
