= Jürgen Wölfer =

German jazz writer

Jürgen Wölfer (25 December 1944 – 24 July 2015) was a German music writer and historian with focus on Jazz.

== Life ==
Born in Eisleben, Wölfer studied education, graduated with a diploma and worked for a long time in the record industry, where he was most recently at BMG, where he was product manager for jazz and classical music. He is known as the author of several jazz encyclopaedias, wrote an encyclopaedia of popular music (excluding Schlager, rock music, folk music) and film composers. He also wrote a biography of Dizzy Gillespie and wrote discographies of Anita O'Day, Pérez Prado and Johnny Richards (bio-discography).

== Publications ==
- Lexikon des Jazz. Hannibal Verlag, St. Andrä 1999, ISBN 3-85445-164-4 (EA 1993).
- Jazz in Deutschland. Das Lexikon. Alle Musiker und Plattenfirmen von 1920 bis heute. Hannibal Verlag, St. Höfen 2008, ISBN 978-3-85445-274-4 (with over 100 pages of Amiga discography in the appendix)
- with Jack Hartley: Johnny Richards. The Definite Bio-Discography. Balboa Books, Lake Geneva, WI 1999, ISBN 0-936653-84-1.
- Das Große Lexikon der Unterhaltungsmusik. Die populäre Musik vom 19. Jahrhundert bis zur Gegenwart; vom Wiener Walzer bis zu Swing, Latin Music und Easy Listening. Verlag Schwarzkopf & Schwarzkopf, Berlin 2000, ISBN 3-89602-272-5.
- with Roland Löper: Das große Lexikon der Filmkomponisten. Die Magier der cineastischen Akustik; von Ennio Morricone bis Hans Zimmer. Verlag Schwarzkopf & Schwarzkopf, Berlin 2003, ISBN 3-89602-296-2.
- Handbuch des Jazz. 2nd edition Heyne Verlag, Munich 1980, ISBN 3-453-01025-6 (EA Munich 1979).
- Die Rock- und Popmusik. Eine umfassende Darstellung ihrer Geschichte und Funktion. Heyne Verlag, Munich 1980, ISBN 3-453-01060-4.
- Dizzy Gillespie. Sein Leben, seine Musik, seine Schallplatten (Collection Jazz;Vol. 9). Oreos, Schaftlach 1987, ISBN 3-923657-16-1.
- with Raymond D. Hair: Thinking of You. The Story of Kay Kyser. Bear Manor Media, Albany, GA 2012, ISBN 978-1-59393-636-5.
- Gerald Wilson. A Discography. Almere, NL 2012, ISBN 978-90-77260-00-5.
