= Gerry Hayes =

Australian rules footballer, born 1914

Personal information
- Full name: Gerald Francis Hayes
- Born: 9 November 1914; Ballarat East, Victoria
- Died: 26 September 1971 (aged 56); Cheltenham, Victoria
- Original team: South Ballarat
- Height: 180 cm (5 ft 11 in)
- Weight: 79 kg (174 lb)

Playing career^{1}
Years	Club	Games (Goals)
1936–37	Richmond	16 (3)
1938, 1944	South Melbourne	6 (0)
Total		22 (3)
- ^{1} Playing statistics correct to the end of 1944.

Gerald Francis Hayes (9 November 1914 – 26 September 1971) was an Australian rules footballer who played with Richmond and South Melbourne in the Victorian Football League (VFL).
