= 22 Gia Long Street =

Historic building in Ho Chi Minh City

Coordinates: 10.778276°N 106.70138°E

The 22 Lý Tự Trọng building as seen in 2024, looking from the rear.

22 Gia Long Street (Vietnamese: số 22 đường Gia Long, [jaː lawŋ] yah-lom), now 22 Lý Tự Trọng Street (số 22 đường Lý Tự Trọng), is an apartment building in Ho Chi Minh City, Vietnam. In April 1975, photojournalist Hubert van Es, working for UPI, captured an iconic photo of U.S. government employees evacuating the city by helicopter during the fall of Saigon, the last major battle of the Vietnam War. The photo depicts an Air America Huey helicopter landed on the roof of the elevator shaft of the building, evacuating employees as North Vietnamese People's Army of Vietnam troops entered Saigon. The evacuation was codenamed Operation Frequent Wind.

== Photo location ==
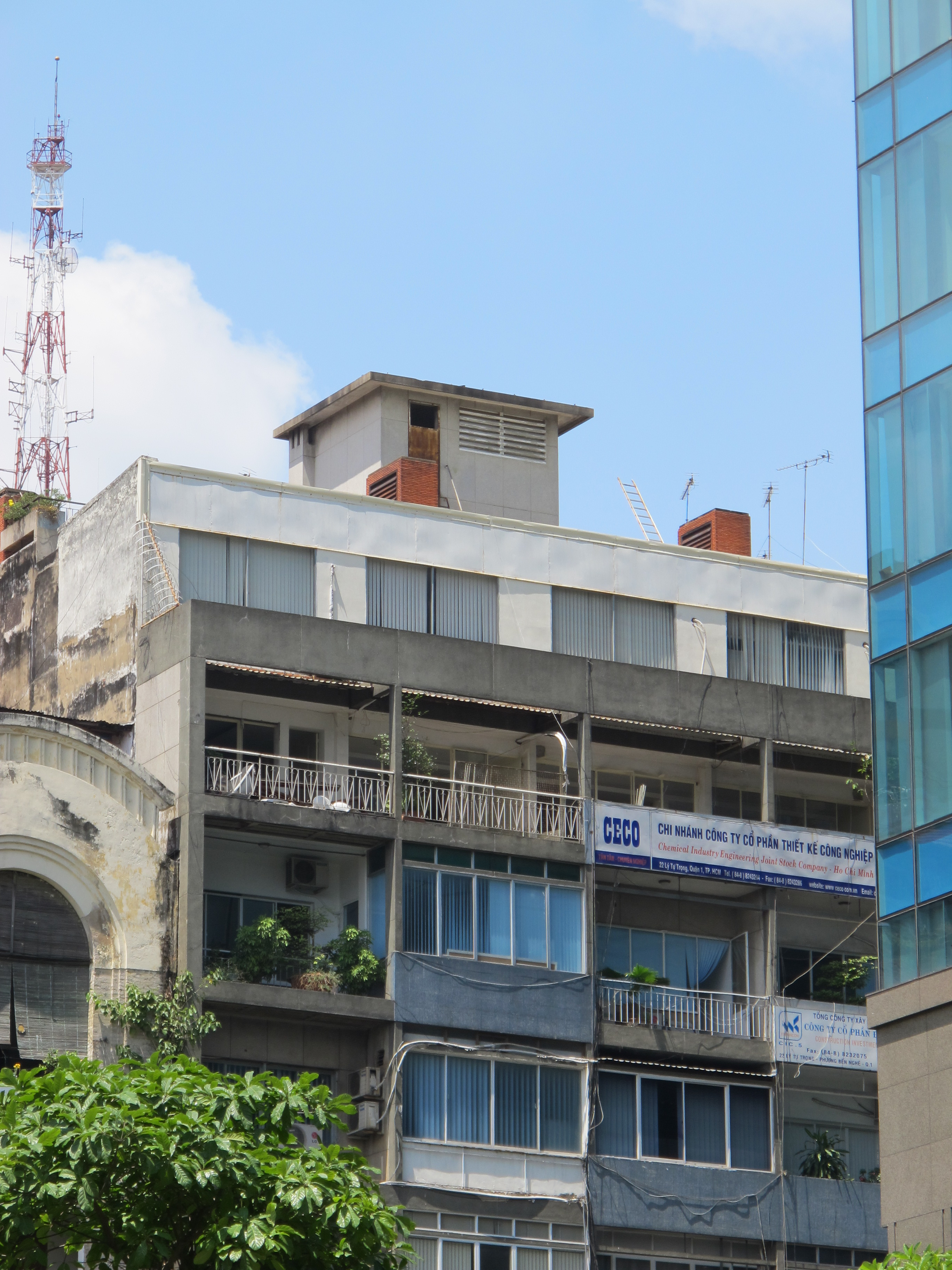
Facade of the building in 2019.

The image was widely misreported as showing Americans crowding on to the roof of the United States Embassy to board a helicopter. In reality, the apartment complex, then called the Pittman Apartments, housed employees of the United States Agency for International Development (USAID), with its top floor reserved for the Central Intelligence Agency's deputy chief of station; the embassy was located at 4 Thống Nhứt Boulevard (now Lê Duẩn Boulevard), about 950 metres (0.59 mi) to the north-northeast.

The frequent misunderstanding of what the photograph shows stems from a change made to the photograph's caption at the Tokyo office of United Press International (UPI). Although the photographer van Es submitted the photo to UPI with an accurate caption, UPI's Tokyo office changed the caption so it falsely read: "A U.S. helicopter evacuating employees of the U.S. embassy." Although van Es repeatedly attempted to correct the error, his efforts were "futile" and he eventually "gave up." Thus, as van Es has explained, "[O]ne of the best known images of the Vietnam War shows something other than what almost everyone thinks it does."

== Aftermath ==
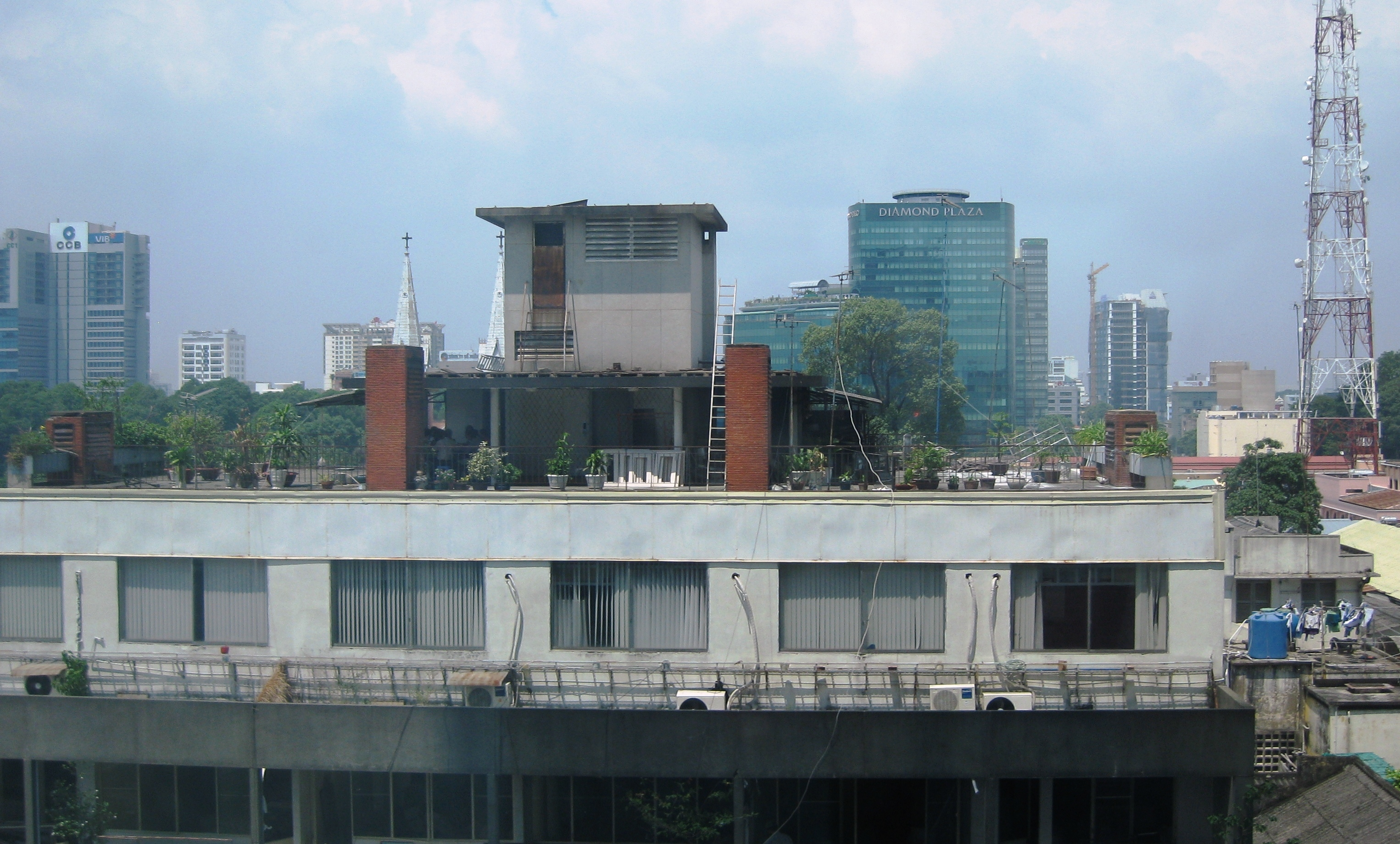
Top of the building, 2012.

At the end of the war, Saigon was renamed Ho Chi Minh City, and Gia Long Street (named for the emperor Gia Long, reigned 1802–1820) was renamed Lý Tự Trọng Street, in honor of a 17-year-old communist executed by the French. Visitors are allowed access to the roof by taking the elevator to the 9th floor. In June 2026 the price for entry was 100,000 Vietnamese Dong (approx $3.80 USD). The security guard will call the elevator and press the 9th floor button after which the visitor is unescorted and free to inspect the rooftop alone.

As the 2021 Taliban offensive led to the Fall of Kabul, reporters drew comparisons between the evacuation at 22 Gia Long Street and images of helicopter evacuations from the U.S. embassy in Kabul. The BBC continued to misreport the photo as showing the US Embassy, later changed to "CIA station".
