= Marciano Guzman =

Filipino poet, philosopher and certified public accountant

Marciano Guzman

Marciano Malvar Guzman was a Filipino poet, philosopher and certified public accountant. He is also a best-selling author of Catholic books, a winner of the Catholic Mass Media Award. He was also a member of the governing body of Opus Dei in the Philippines from 1992 until his death on 28 May 2009.

He has a doctorate in Journalism and Philosophy from universities in Spain and Italy. Breaking into Light, his collection of 100 selected poems, was published by the University of Asia and the Pacific in Manila. His poetry has appeared mostly in Philippine national print publications like Philippines Free Press, Solidarity and Philippine Graphic, among others. More recent credits include U.S. online magazines like Flutter Poetry Journal, Static Movement, The Monongahela Review, and Slow Trains Literary Journal.

He used his literary talents most by writing some best-selling Catechisms, the most popular of which was Guide to Christian Living. He wrote many columns for newspapers on Catholic doctrine in language understandable to the ordinary person in the street. Many of these columns found their ways into books used in Religion classes in schools. He was the first chaplain of the PAREF Woodrose School, the first school of Parents for Education Foundation.

Bishop Javier Echevarria, Prelate of Opus Dei, appointed him on 2 November 1992 as Regional Vice Priest Secretary of Opus Dei in the Philippines, a leading member of the governing body in the entire country, in charge of the apostolate with women.

He is the great grandnephew of the Philippine national hero, Jose Rizal, because the mother of his maternal grandmother was Soledad, a sister of Rizal. His full name is Marciano Malvar Guzman, since he is also a descendant of General Miguel Malvar, the last Filipino general to surrender to the American forces during the Philippine–American War. His mother is Josefina Malvar Guzman, daughter of Bernabe Malvar, son of the general. He wrote papers, articles and a book about Jose Rizal, specially dealing with Rizal's Retraction, entitled Hard Facts About Rizal's Conversion .

== Works ==
- Breaking into Light
- Question and Answer Catechism
- Guide to Christian Belief
- Guide to Christian Sanctification
- Transforming hearts and structures : current and perennial issues on social ethics
- Light for Lives: Current Issues on Moral Values Queries and Replies on Love, Life, and Religion
- Hard Facts About Rizal's Conversion
