= Hubert van Es =

Dutch photographer and photojournalist

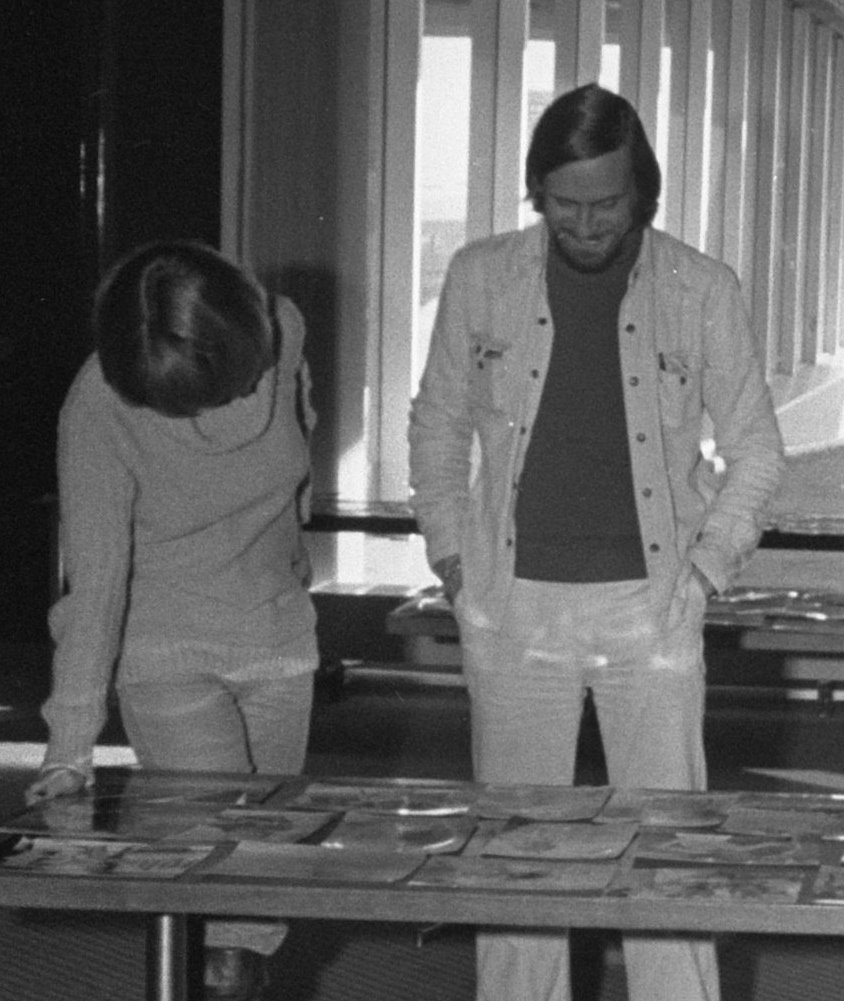
- Van Es (right) judging photographs in 1977
- Born: 6 July 1941; Hilversum, The Netherlands
- Died: 15 May 2009 (aged 67); Queen Mary Hospital, Pok Fu Lam, Hong Kong
- Other name: Hugh Van Es
- Occupation: Photojournalism
- Notable credit: Fall of Saigon

Hubert van Es (6 July 1941 – 15 May 2009) was a Dutch photographer and photojournalist who took the well-known photo on 29 April 1975, which shows South Vietnamese civilians scrambling to board a CIA Air America helicopter during the U.S. evacuation of Saigon. The picture was taken a day before the Fall of Saigon.

Van Es was variously known in his working life as "Hu", the anglicized "Hugh" and the nickname "Vanes", to rhyme with "planes".

== Early life ==
Hubert van Es was born in Hilversum, the Netherlands. He moved to Hong Kong in 1967, where he initially worked as a freelancer, before joining the South China Morning Post as chief photographer.

== Career in Vietnam ==
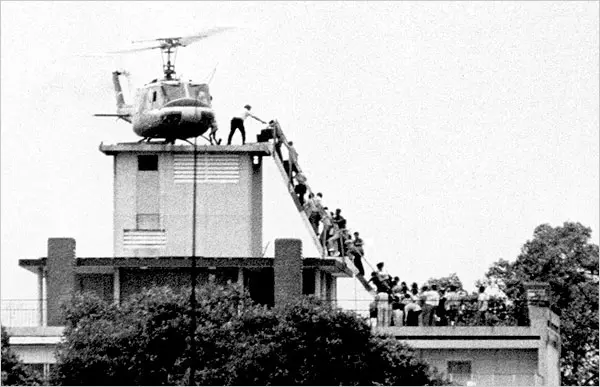
Van Es's famous photo of civilians boarding a CIA helicopter during the evacuation of Saigon

Hubert van Es went to Vietnam in 1968, where he worked for NBC News as a sound man. He later joined the Associated Press photo staff in Saigon from 1969 to 1972 and then covered the last three years of the Vietnam War, from 1972 to 1975, for United Press International (UPI). In 1975, he was working in Saigon for UPI. He remained in the city for as long as possible before its occupation by North Vietnamese troops. On 29 April 1975 he had taken pictures of Saigonese burning documents that could associate them with the United States as well as a picture of a Marine confronting a Vietnamese mother and her little boy. Later that day, he took his famous picture:

Around 2:30 in the afternoon, while I was working in the darkroom, I suddenly heard Bert Okuley shout, "Van Es, get out here, there's a chopper on that roof!" I grabbed my camera and the longest lens left in the office - it was only 300 millimeters, but it would have to do - and dashed to the balcony. Looking at the Pittman Apartments, I could see 20 or 30 people on the roof, climbing the ladder to an Air America Huey helicopter. At the top of the ladder stood an American in civilian clothes, pulling people up and shoving them inside. Of course, there was no possibility that all the people on the roof could get into the helicopter, and it took off with 12 or 14 on board. (The recommended maximum for that model was eight.) Those left on the roof waited for hours, hoping for more helicopters to arrive. To no avail. The enemy was closing in. I remember looking up to the sky and giving a short prayer. After shooting about 10 frames, I went back to the darkroom to process the film and get a print ready for the regular 5 p.m. transmission to Tokyo from Saigon's telegraph office.

When North Vietnamese troops arrived, Van Es wore a camouflage hat bearing a small plastic Dutch flag printed with the Vietnamese words Báo chí Hà Lan ("Dutch Press").

The building in the photo, which has been incorrectly identified as the US Embassy, Saigon since the 1970s, was not labelled as such by Van Es. He has stated that he wrote, for the caption of his photograph, that the helicopter was taking evacuees off the roof of a CIA building in Saigon (22 Gia Long Street). At United Press International's (UPI) Tokyo office, someone changed the caption to include the false reference to the "U.S. embassy." Although van Es attempted to have the caption corrected, his efforts proved futile and he eventually gave up. The location's current address is 22 Lý Tự Trọng Street (named after Lý Tự Trọng, a 17-year-old communist executed by the French) and visitors are allowed access to the roof by taking the elevator to the 9th floor.

== Later career ==
Van Es covered the insurgency in the Philippines and the Soviet invasion of Afghanistan. He attempted to return to Vietnam but was not able to do so until 1990. Upon his return to Vietnam, while visiting the countryside, he was quoted as remarking: "It [Vietnam] hasn't really changed since I was last here; but our photos changed the views of those who were lucky enough not to witness this terrible war."

== Death ==
On 15 May 2009, Van Es died in Queen Mary Hospital, Hong Kong, at the age of 67 from a haemorrhagic stroke. He had lived in Hong Kong since the end of the Vietnam War.
