= Kay Blümel =

German basketball coach (born 1963)

Personal information
- Born: 15 December 1963 (age 62)
- Position: Head coach
- Coaching career: 2000–present

Career history

Coaching
- 2000–2001: German Junior National Team (assistant)
- 2004–2006: U17 Germany men's national basketball team
- 2010–2013: U18 Germany men's national basketball team
- 2019–2020: SC Karlsruhe

Career highlights
- As head coach: 1. Regionalliga Southwest Division champion (2020); 1. Regionalliga Southwest Division Coach of the Year (2020)

Kay Blümel (born 15 December 1963) is a German basketball head coach who last coached the German team, SC Karlsruhe of the 1. Regionalliga.

== Coaching career ==
Blümel started his coaching stint as a junior level coach, training aspiring players to get on the professional level/s or leagues. In 2018, he led the German U-18 team to a gold medal finish at the Albert Schweitzer Tournament. In 2020, after spending decades in the youth level, he was signed to be the head coach of Karlsruhe Lions.

== Head coaching record ==
As of April 16, 2022

Team	Year	G	W	L	W–L%	Result
SC Karlsruhe	2019-20	23	22	1	.9565	
Career		23	22	1	.9565	
