= Johan Klopper =

South African cricketer (born 1972)

Personal information
- Full name: Johan Wilhelm Francois Klopper
- Born: 4 October 1972 (age 54); Grahamstown, Cape Province, South Africa
- Batting: Right-handed
- Bowling: Right-arm medium

Domestic team information
- Years: Team
- 1997/98–2000/01: Border
- 2007: Oxfordshire

Career statistics
Competition	First-class	List A
Matches	1	9
Runs scored	0	24
Batting average	0.00	4.00
100s/50s	–/–	–/–
Top score	0	9
Balls bowled	24	234
Wickets	0	4
Bowling average	–	54.50
5 wickets in innings	–	–
10 wickets in match	–	–
Best bowling	–	2/39
Catches/stumpings	–/–	2/–
- Source: Cricinfo, 24 June 2019

Johan Wilhelm Francois Klopper (born 4 October 1972) is a South African former cricketer.

Klopper was born at Grahamstown in October 1972. He made his debut for Border in List A one-day cricket against Easterns in the 1997/98 Standard Bank League. He played one-day cricket for Border until the 2000/01 Standard Bank Cup, making a total of nine one-day appearances. He took 4 wickets in these matches, as well as scoring 24 runs. He made just a single appearance for Border in first-class cricket against Easterns in the 2000/01 SuperSport Series. He played later minor counties cricket in England for Oxfordshire, making a single appearance against Herefordshire in the 2007 Minor Counties Championship.
