= Embassy of the United States, Saigon =

U.S. embassy in Saigon, South Vietnam during the Vietnam War; now demolished

- Đại sứ quán Hoa Kỳ, Sài Gòn (Vietnamese)
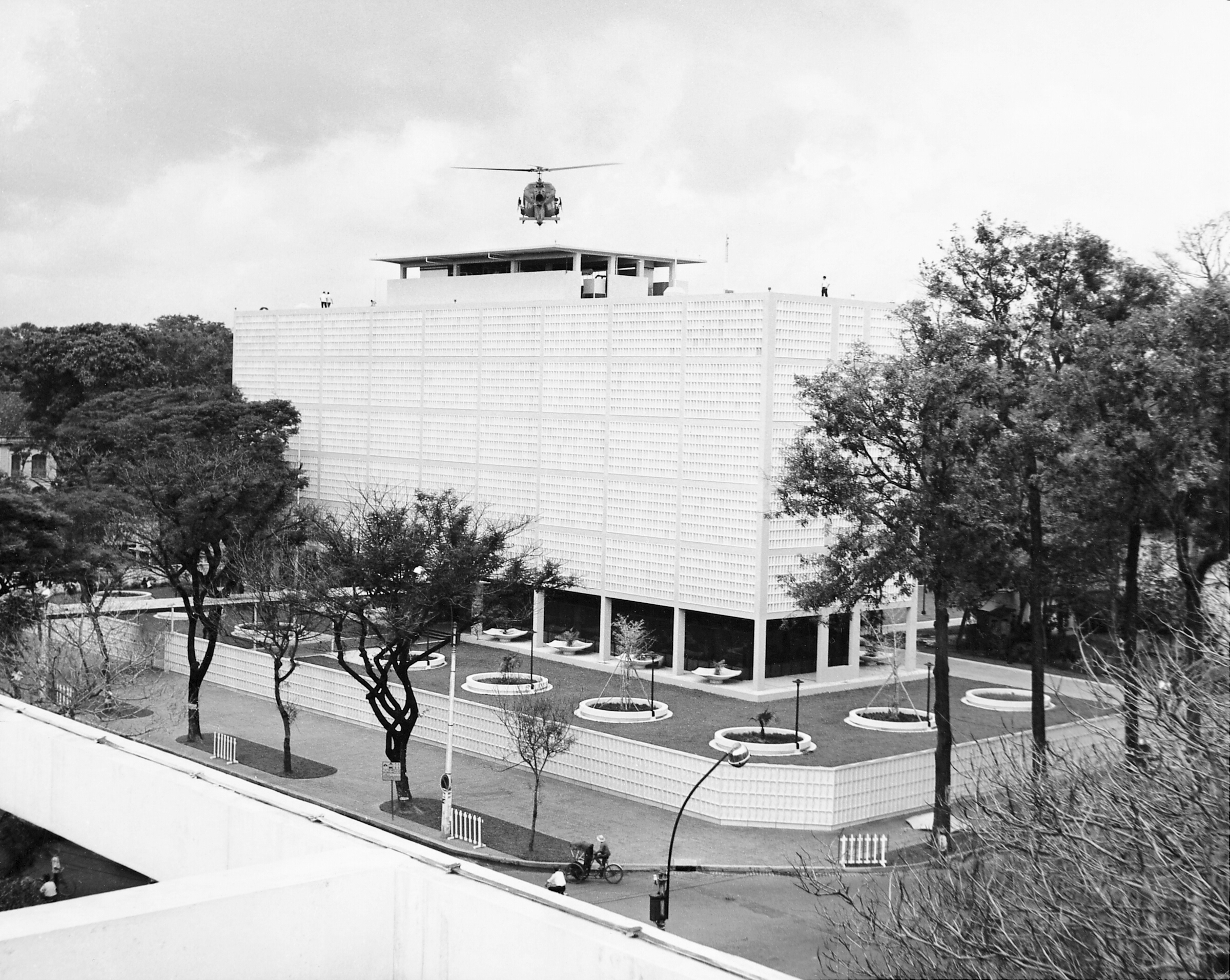
- Second chancery in 1967
- Location: Saigon, South Vietnam; 1967 embassy: 10.7833°N 106.7004°E; Old embassy (1952–1967): 10.770475°N 106.7049°E

History
- Demolished: June 1998

Site notes
- Area: 3.18 acres (12,900 m^{2}) (second embassy)
- Architect(s): Adrian Wilson and Associates (Second embassy only)
- Governing body: United States Department of State

The United States Embassy in Saigon was first established in June 1952, and moved into a new building in 1967 and eventually closed in 1975. The embassy was the scene of a number of significant events of the Vietnam War, most notably the Viet Cong attack during the Tet Offensive which helped turn American public opinion against the war, and the helicopter evacuation during the Fall of Saigon after which the embassy closed permanently.

In 1995, the U.S. and the Socialist Republic of Vietnam formally established relations and the embassy grounds and building were handed back to the United States. The former embassy was subsequently demolished in 1998 and is currently a park inside of the U.S. Consulate General's compound in what is now called Ho Chi Minh City.

== First embassy ==
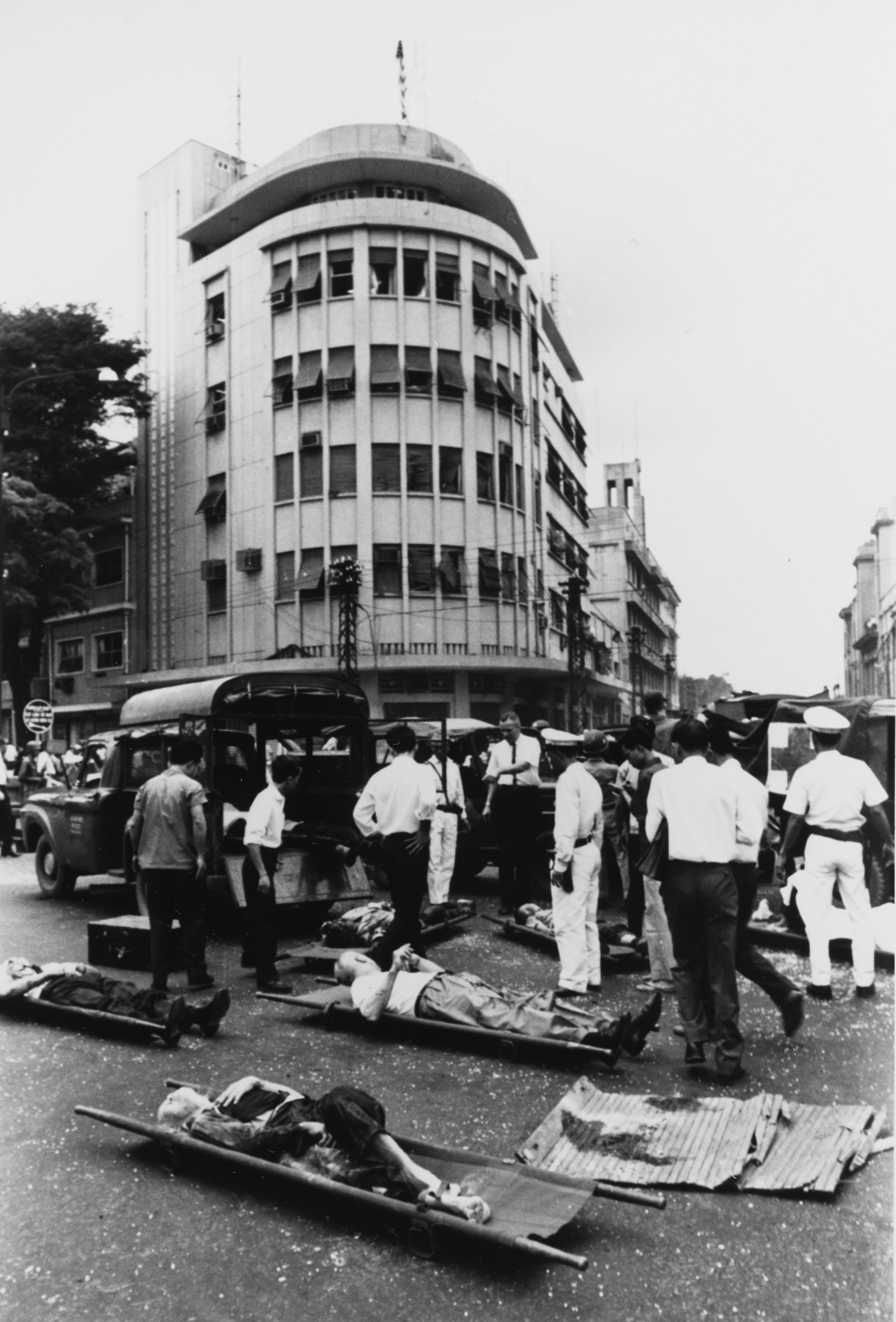
First U.S. embassy on Hàm Nghi Boulevard after the bombing

The U.S. diplomatic presence in Saigon was established on 9 December 1907, as a consulate. It acted as a representative to French Indochina succeeding an American commercial agent that had been established in Saigon in 1889. The United States granted recognition to the State of Vietnam led by the Bảo Đại government in 1950, and on 17 February, the Consulate-General in Saigon was elevated to Legation status with Edmund A. Gullion as Chargé d'Affaires ad interim. Following the Geneva Accords of 1954 and the subsequent partitioning into North Vietnam and South Vietnam, the United States did not extend diplomatic recognition to North Vietnam. On 24 June 1952, after the U.S. Senate confirmed Donald R. Heath as the U.S. Ambassador to South Vietnam, the Legation in Saigon's status was raised and the embassy was formally established. The first embassy was located at 39 Hàm Nghi Boulevard and the original building remains there today.

=== 1965 embassy bombing ===
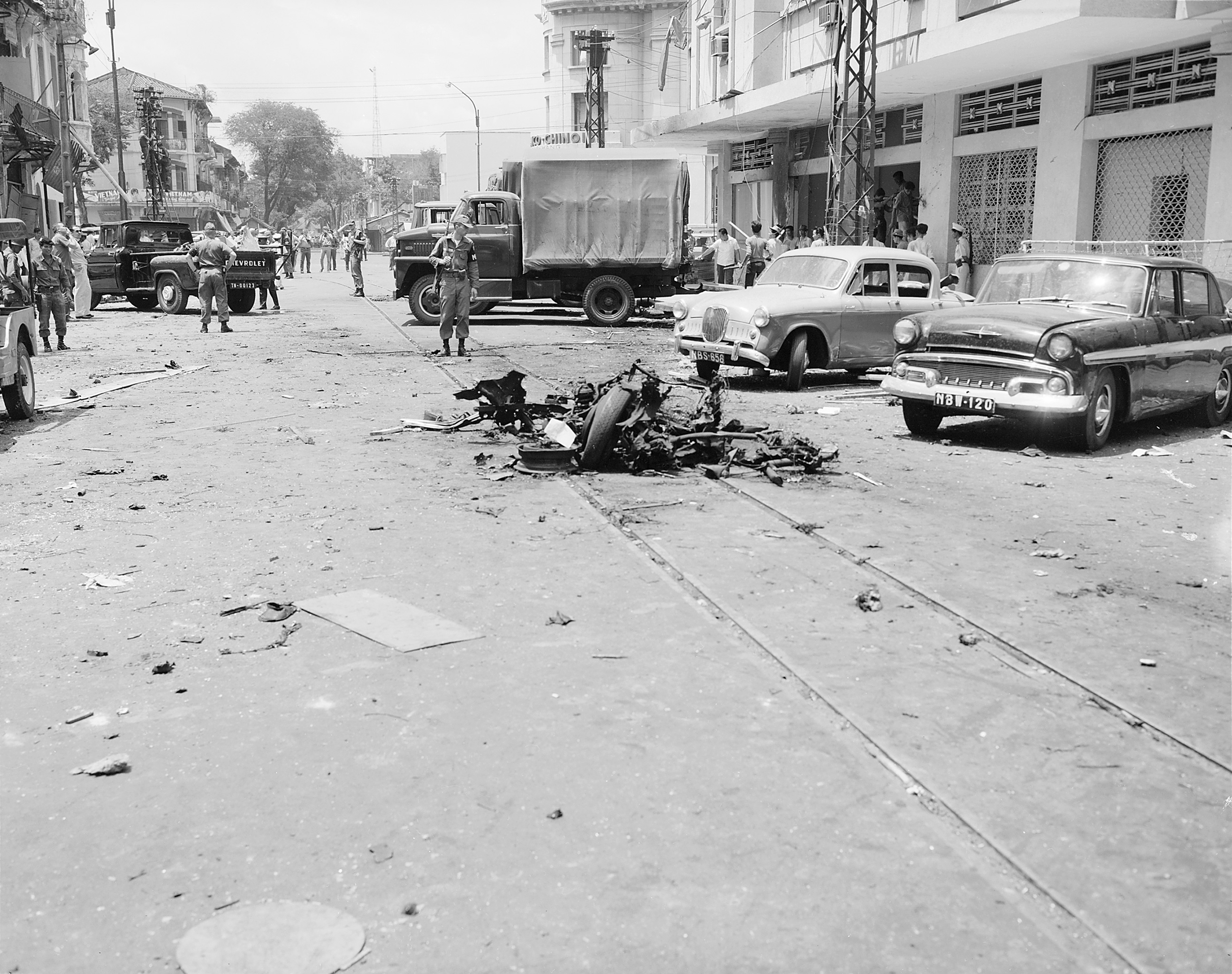
Wreckage from Viet Cong car bomb

On 30 March 1965, the Viet Cong detonated a car-bomb outside the embassy. The attack occurred when a Vietnamese policeman began arguing with the driver of a car parked in front of the embassy but the driver refused to leave and then another Viet Cong member drove up alongside the car and fired on the policeman. Quickly following the brief exchange of fire, the car, which contained 300 pounds of plastic explosives, detonated in front of the embassy killing two Americans, one female CIA employee, Barbara Robbins, and another American, as well as 19 Vietnamese and one Filipino serving in the U.S. Navy along with injuring 183 others. The U.S. Congress appropriated $1 million to reconstruct the embassy in a new location following the attack and although retaliatory raids on North Vietnam were suggested, U.S. President Lyndon Johnson refused. Following the attack, South Vietnamese Foreign Minister Tran Van Do posthumously decorated Barbara Robbins and the Filipino navy serviceman with the Medal of Honor First Class.

== Second chancery ==
=== Embassy compound ===
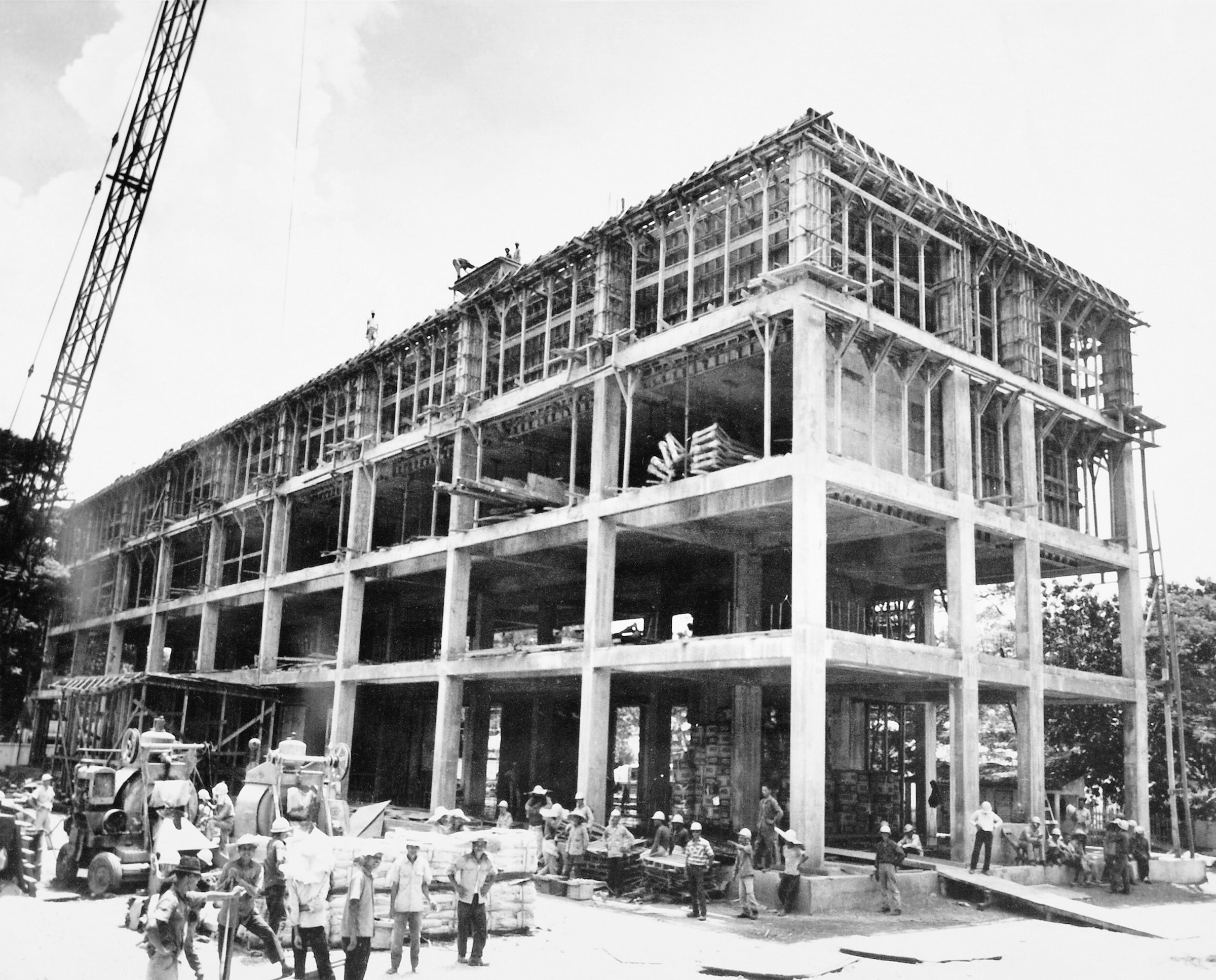
Chancery under construction, 1966

Due to security concerns following the 1965 bombing, it was decided that a new embassy with greater protection would be constructed. The site selected was a 3.18-acre (12,900 m^{2}) site known as the Norodom Compound at No 4 Thong Nhut (now Le Duan) Boulevard at the corner of Thong Nhut and Mac Dinh Chi Street, near to where the Bến Nghé Channel enters the Saigon River. The embassy was next to the French embassy, opposite the British embassy, and located near the Presidential Palace.

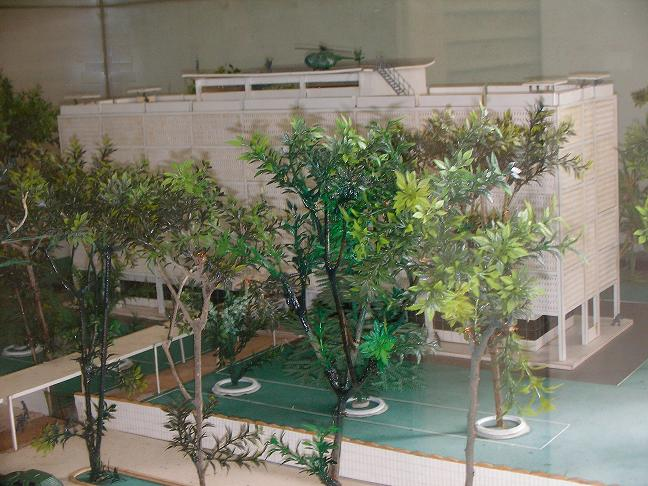
Model of the second chancery in the Museum of Ho Chi Minh City.

Although originally designed in early 1965 by the firm Curtis and Davis, their design had only called for three stories and due to the increased U.S. commitment in Vietnam, a larger building was needed. As such in November 1965 the firm Adrian Wilson and Associates were selected to redesign the building. The new design originally called for four stories but was then raised to six, and was built between 1965 and 1967 by the American construction company RMK-BRJ under the direction of the U.S. Navy Officer in Charge of Construction RVN. RMK-BRJ employed a workforce of 500 Vietnamese, primarily using materials from the U.S. due to the scarcity of commodities in South Vietnam at the time. Despite that the sand and gravel used in the concrete mix, along with the walkway tiles, and the bricks used in all the interior walls were sourced from Vietnam. The embassy was opened on September 29, 1967, after more than two years of construction and cost a total of 2.6 million dollars.

The second chancery exterior in 1968

The embassy comprised two separate compounds, a consular compound sealed off by a separate wall and steel gate and the embassy compound with the chancery, behind it was a parking lot, a two-story villa used as a residence by the mission coordinator (a civilian assistant to the United States Ambassador to South Vietnam), a motor pool and other facilities. There were two entry gates, a pedestrian entrance on Thong Nhut Boulevard and a vehicle entrance on Mac Dinh Chi Street. The new chancery was a distinctive six-story white concrete building, with a concrete lattice facade that served to both cool the building and deflect rockets and other projectiles. Due to both aesthetics and security, the chancery was set back from the street. The chancery was a rectangular building, 208 feet (63 m) by 49 feet (15 m), and was enclosed in a walled compound that is 437 feet (133 m) by 318 feet (97 m) (3.18 acres). It was located 60 feet (18 m) inside the compound, protected from both streets by an 8 feet (2.4 m) wall with a 6 inches (150 mm)-thick mixture of cement and marble chips. The lattice facade extends from the first story to the roof, covering the entire building in a protective white terrazzo sunscreen. It was separated from the concrete walls and the shatterproof plexiglass windows of the chancery by five feet of space.

The chancery was designed for a staff of 200, with 49,670 square feet of office space comprising 140 offices. There were also executive offices on the third floor for the Ambassador's office and other high-ranking members of the Mission. It was also air conditioned, had its own water filtration system, and at the rear of the compound, had a power plant consisting of four 350 kilowatt generators. The chancery also had small helipad (75x49-feet) on the roof. A concrete awning extended from the chancery out over the pedestrian entrance on Thong Nhut Boulevard.

The old embassy on Hàm Nghi Boulevard remained in use as an embassy annex.

=== Tet offensive ===
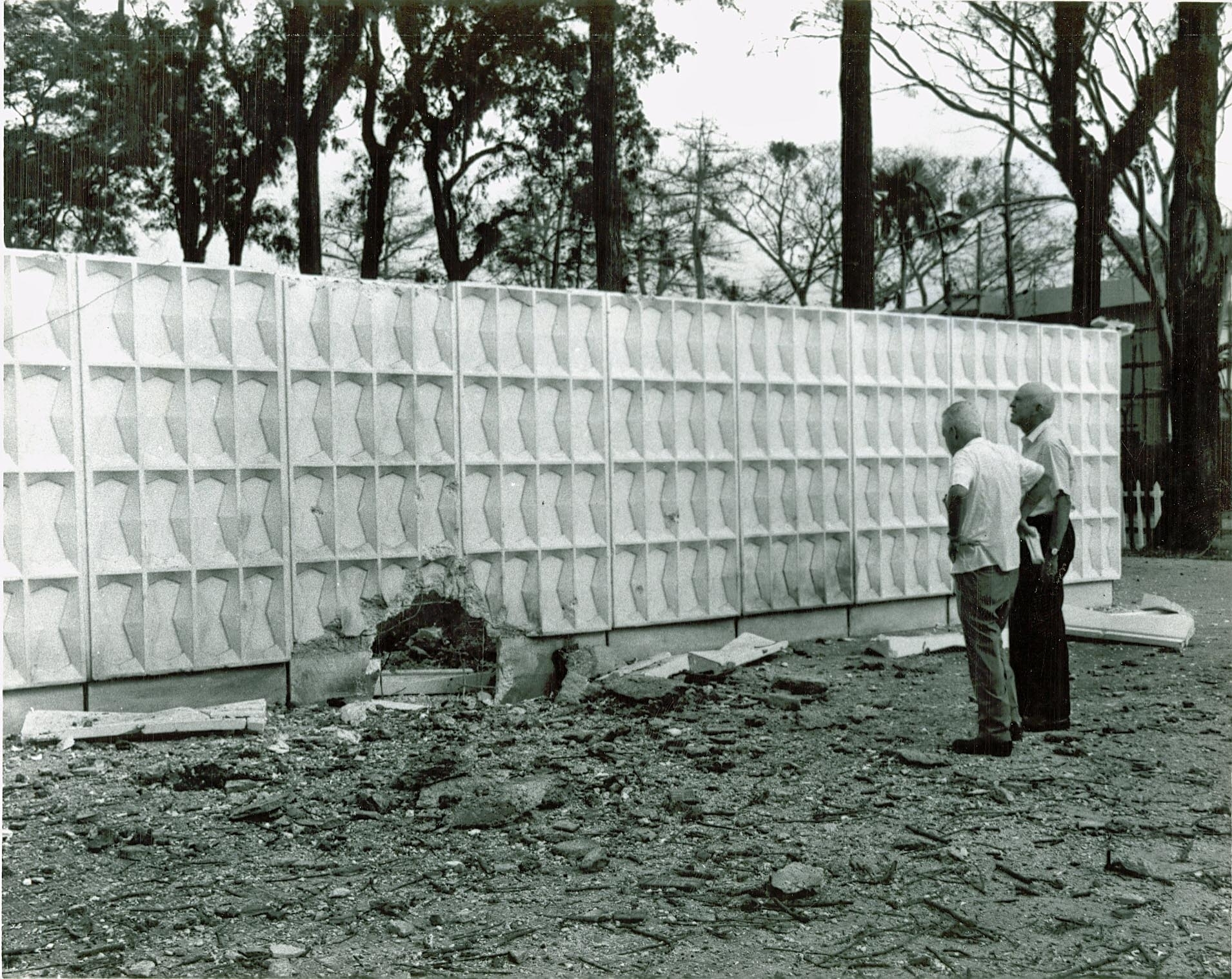
Hole blown in embassy perimeter wall through which the Viet Cong entered the embassy grounds

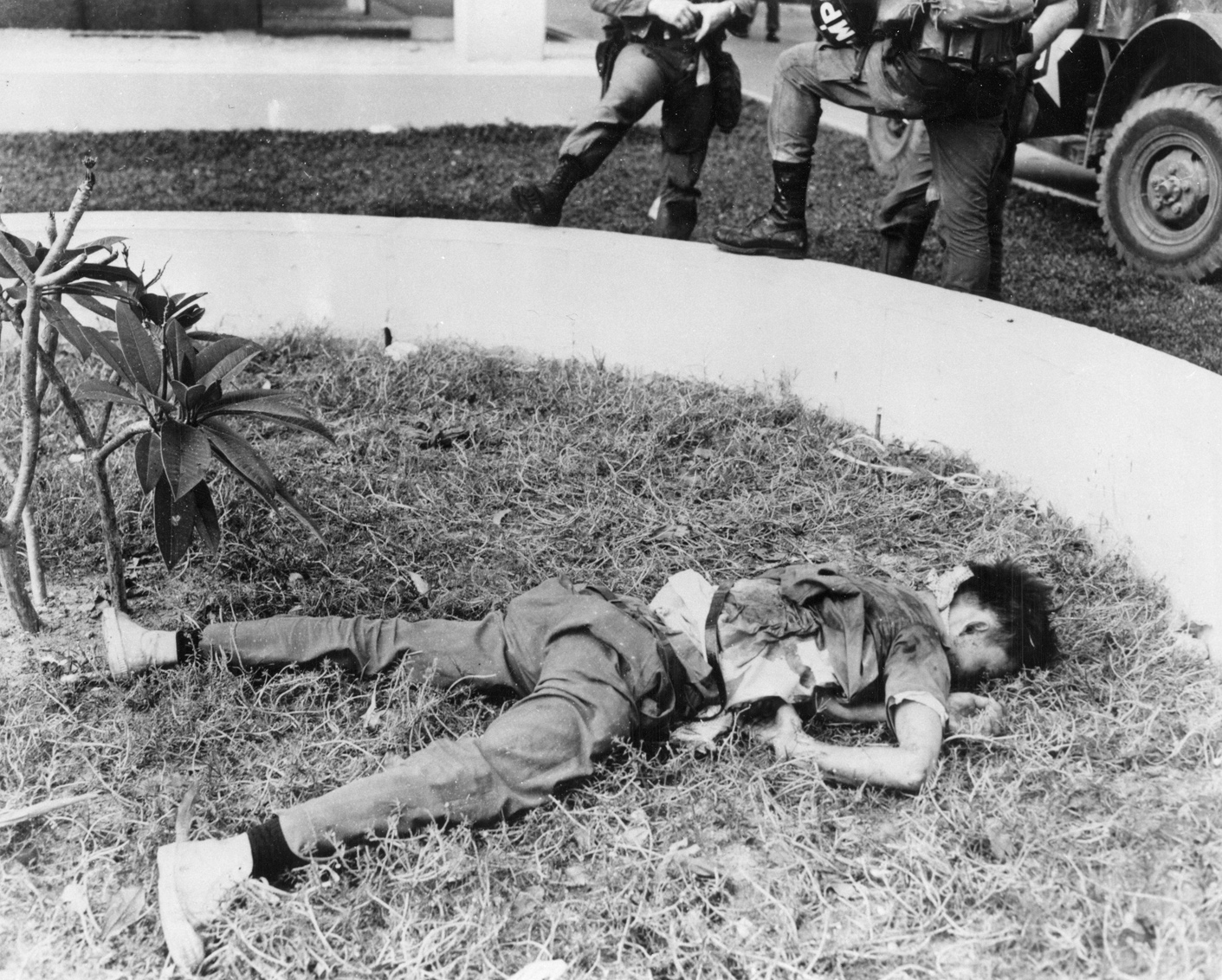
Viet Cong sapper dead in a planter on the embassy grounds

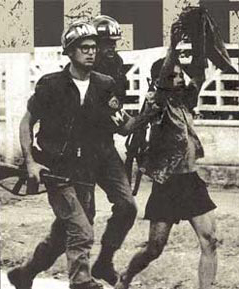
MPs escort a Viet Cong captive away from the embassy

On the early morning of 31 January 1968, as part of the Tet Offensive, 19 Viet Cong sappers from the elite C-10 Sapper Battalion attacked the embassy. The VC were engaged by two military policemen from the 716th Military Police Battalion – part of the 18th Military Police Brigade – at the vehicle entrance on Mac Dinh Chi Street who raised the alarm. Inside the chancery building U.S. Marines of the Marine Security Guard sealed the building.

Minutes later at 02:47, the VC blew a small hole in the perimeter wall on Thong Nhut Boulevard and gained access to the embassy compound. The first two VC that crawled through the hole and into the grounds were shot and killed by the two MPs in their guard post at the Mac Dinh Chi Street entrance. The MPs radioed for help before being killed by VC fire. An MP Jeep patrol responded to the calls for help from the embassy but as they approached the embassy they were met by automatic weapons fire from the VC that were outside the wall, killing both MPs.

In addition to three marines, there were two Vietnamese and six American civilians inside the chancery building at the time of the attack. The Americans armed themselves with .38 revolvers, Beretta M12 submachine guns and a shotgun and waited for the VC to come inside. Outside in the embassy grounds, the VC were unsure of their next move as both their leaders had both been killed after they entered the embassy grounds. The VC could easily have blasted their way into the chancery had they been ordered to do so; instead they took positions in or near the circular planters around the chancery and returned fire at the growing numbers of Americans shooting at them.

The remaining marines of the Marine Security Guard detachment were organised into quick reaction teams and headed to the embassy where they laid fire on the embassy gardens.

At 04:20, General William Westmoreland ordered the 716th MP Battalion to clear the embassy as their first priority. Lacking armored vehicles and helicopters, the MPs moved in more troops to cordon off the embassy. The tactical situation was confused by darkness and the poor communications within the chancery and between the chancery and the MPs and marines outside the embassy compound.

As dawn broke on the morning of 31 January, MPs and marines entered the embassy grounds and within a few minutes, they easily killed all of the few surviving VC for most of them by then were already dead or dying in the embassy garden from the prolonged firefight. At the same time, a helicopter carrying troops from the 101st Airborne Division landed on the roof and proceeded to sweep the chancery building, finding no VC inside.

By 09:00, the embassy was declared secure. Of the 19 VC that attacked the building, 18 had been killed and one wounded VC was captured. U.S. losses were 4 MPs and 1 marine killed.

The first news reports of the embassy attack were sent by the Associated Press at 03:15 based on fragmentary information, a later report stated that three VC had entered the embassy grounds. The news reports from the embassy reflected the confused tactical situation. At 07:25, the Associated Press carried a story stating that the VC had seized part of the first floor of the embassy building and that U.S. forces were being held back by fire from the embassy building. This report was picked up by NBC news who, on the 18:30 EST (06:30 ICT) Huntley–Brinkley Report, broadcast that the VC occupied the first floor of the embassy building and that U.S. forces were in the embassy grounds exchanging fire with them. Later news reports corrected the facts of the attack, but the initial reports had shocked the American public.

While the embassy attack (like much of the Tet Offensive) was tactically insignificant, it had a profound political and psychological impact. The United States had been fighting in Vietnam for over two-and-a-half years, 20,000 Americans had been killed and despite the presence of nearly 500,000 U.S. troops in Vietnam, the VC had managed to penetrate the U.S. Embassy.

=== Post-Tet offensive ===
On 4 November 1968, Ambassador Bunker presented a scroll of appreciation to LTC Tyler H. Fletcher, commanding officer of the 716th Military Police Battalion for their role in defending the embassy. Ambassador Bunker also dedicated a plaque in the chancery lobby commemorating the four MPs and one marine who died defending the embassy.

A fire-bomb attack on the embassy took place on 18 February 1971.

== Fall of Saigon and Operation Frequent Wind ==
On 12 April 1975, the 9th Marine Amphibious Brigade (9th MAB), which was to supply helicopters and a security force for the evacuation, sent a delegation to consult with Ambassador Graham Martin on current plans. Ambassador Martin told them that he would not tolerate any outward signs that the United States intended to abandon South Vietnam. All planning would have to be conducted with the utmost discretion. Brigadier General Richard E. Carey, commander of the 9th MAB, flew to Saigon the next day to see Ambassador Martin, he later said that ‘The visit was cold, non-productive and appeared to be an irritant to the Ambassador’.

On 25 April, 40 marines from the 9th MAB on the USS Hancock were flown in by Air America helicopters in civilian clothes to the DAO Compound to augment the 18 Marine Security Guards assigned to defend the embassy, an additional 6 marines were assigned to protect Ambassador Martin.

Ambassador Martin remained optimistic that a negotiated settlement could be reached whereby the United States would not have to pull out of South Vietnam and, in an effort to avert defeatism and panic he specifically instructed Major James Kean, commanding officer of the Marine Security Guard Battalion and ground support force commander United States Embassy Compound, that he could not begin to remove trees and shrubbery which prevented the use of the embassy parking lot as a helicopter landing zone.

On 28 April at 18:00 Tan Son Nhut Air Base was bombed by three A-37 Dragonflies piloted by former RVNAF pilots who had defected to the Vietnamese People's Air Force at the fall of Da Nang. Sporadic People's Army of Vietnam (PAVN) rocket and artillery attacks also started to hit the airport, increasing to 40 rounds per hour by 04:00 on 29 April.

At 07:00, Major General Homer D. Smith, the defense attache, advised Ambassador Martin that fixed wing evacuations should cease and that Operation Frequent Wind, the helicopter evacuation of U.S. personnel and at-risk Vietnamese should commence. Ambassador Martin refused to accept General Smith's recommendation and instead insisted on visiting Tan Son Nhut to survey the situation for himself. Finally at 10:51 the order was given to commence Operation Frequent Wind, however due to confusion in the chain of command General Carey did not receive the execute order until 12:15.

The two major evacuation points chosen for Operation Frequent Wind were the DAO Compound adjacent to Tan Son Nhut Airport for American civilian and Vietnamese evacuees and the embassy for embassy staff.

By the morning of 29 April it was estimated that approximately 10,000 people had gathered around the embassy, while some 2,500 evacuees were in the embassy and consular compounds. From 10:00 to 12:00 Major Kean and his marines cut down trees and moved vehicles to create an LZ in the embassy parking lot behind the chancery building. Two LZs were now available in the embassy compound, the rooftop for UH-1s and CH-46 Sea Knights and the new parking lot LZ for the heavier CH-53 Sea Stallions.

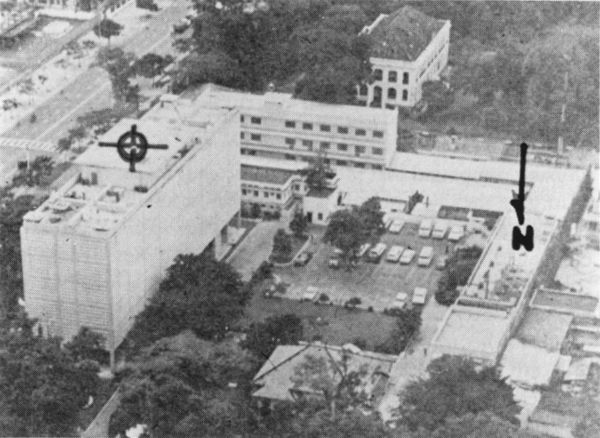
Aerial view of the U.S. embassy, Saigon, showing Thong Nhut Boulevard on the far left, the chancery building (left), parking lot (center) and consulate compound and French embassy (top)

Air America UH-1s began ferrying evacuees from other smaller assembly points throughout the city (including the Pittman Building, famously photographed by Hubert van Es) and dropping them on the embassy's rooftop LZ.

At 15:00 the first CH-53s were sighted heading towards the DAO Compound at Tan Son Nhut. Major Kean contacted the Seventh Fleet to advise them of his airlift requirements; until that time the fleet believed that all evacuees had been bussed from the embassy to the DAO Compound and that only two helicopters would be required to evacuate the Ambassador and the marines from the embassy.

At 17:00 the first CH-46 landed at the embassy. Between 19:00 and 21:00 on 29 April approximately 130 additional marines from 2nd Battalion, 4th Marines were lifted from the DAO Compound to reinforce perimeter security at the embassy, bringing the total number of marines at the embassy to 175. The evacuation from the DAO Compound was completed by about 19:00, after which all helicopters would be routed to the embassy; however, Major Kean was informed that operations would cease at dark. Major Kean advised that the LZ would be well lit and had vehicles moved around the parking lot LZ with their engines running and headlights on to illuminate the LZ.

At 21:30 a CH-53 pilot informed Major Kean that the Admiral Whitmire, Commander of Task Force 76 had ordered that operations cease at 23:00. Major Kean saw Ambassador Martin to request that he contact the Oval Office to ensure that the airlift continued. Ambassador Martin soon sent word back to Major Kean that sorties would continue to be flown. At the same time, General Carey met with Admiral Whitmire to convince him to resume flights to the embassy despite pilot weariness and poor visibility caused by darkness, fires and bad weather.

By 02:15 on 30 April, one CH-46 and one CH-53 were landing at the embassy every 10 minutes, with the embassy indicating that another 19 lifts would complete the evacuation. At the time, Major Kean estimated that there were still some 850 non-American evacuees and 225 Americans (including the marines), Ambassador Martin told Major Kean to do the best he could. At 03:00, Ambassador Martin ordered Major Kean to move all the remaining evacuees into the parking lot LZ which was the marines' final perimeter. At 03:27 President Gerald Ford ordered that no more than 19 additional lifts be allowed to complete the evacuation.

At 04:30 with the 19 lift limit already exceeded, Major Kean went to the rooftop LZ and spoke over a helicopter radio with General Carey who advised that President Ford had ordered that the airlift be limited to U.S. personnel and General Carey, Commanding General, 9th MAB, ordered Major Kean to withdraw his men into the chancery building and withdraw to the rooftop LZ for evacuation. Major Kean returned to the ground floor of the chancery and ordered his men to withdraw into a large semicircle at the main entrance to the chancery. Most of the marines were inside the chancery when the crowds outside the embassy broke through the gates into the compound. The marines closed and bolted the chancery door, the elevators were locked by Seabees on the 6th floor and the marines withdrew up the stairwells locking grill gates behind them. On the ground floor a water tanker was driven through the chancery door, and the crowd began to surge up through the building toward the rooftop. The marines on the rooftop had sealed the doors to the rooftop and were using mace to discourage the crowd from trying to break through. Sporadic gunfire from around the embassy passed over the rooftop.

At 04:58 Ambassador Martin boarded a USMC CH-46, call-sign "Lady Ace 09" of HMM-165 and was flown to the USS Blue Ridge. When Lady Ace 09 transmitted "Tiger is out", those helicopters still flying thought the mission was complete, thereby delaying the evacuation to the marines from the embassy rooftop.

CH-46s evacuated the Battalion Landing Team by 07:00, and after an anxious wait a lone CH-46 "Swift 2-2" of HMM-164 arrived to evacuate Major Kean and the ten remaining men of the Marine Security Guards; this last helicopter took off at 07:53 on 30 April and landed on USS Okinawa at 09:30. At 11:30 PAVN tanks smashed through the gates of the presidential palace (now the Reunification Palace) and raised the Viet Cong flag over the building; the Vietnam War was over.

Marine pilots accumulated 1,054 flight hours and flew 682 sorties throughout Operation Frequent Wind, evacuating 5,000 from Tan Son Nhut and 978 U.S. and 1,120 Vietnamese and third-country nationals from the embassy. Some 400 evacuees were left behind at the embassy, including over 100 South Korean citizens.

Lady Ace 09, CH-46 serial number 154803 is now on display at the Flying Leatherneck Aviation Museum in San Diego, California.

== Post-war period to present ==
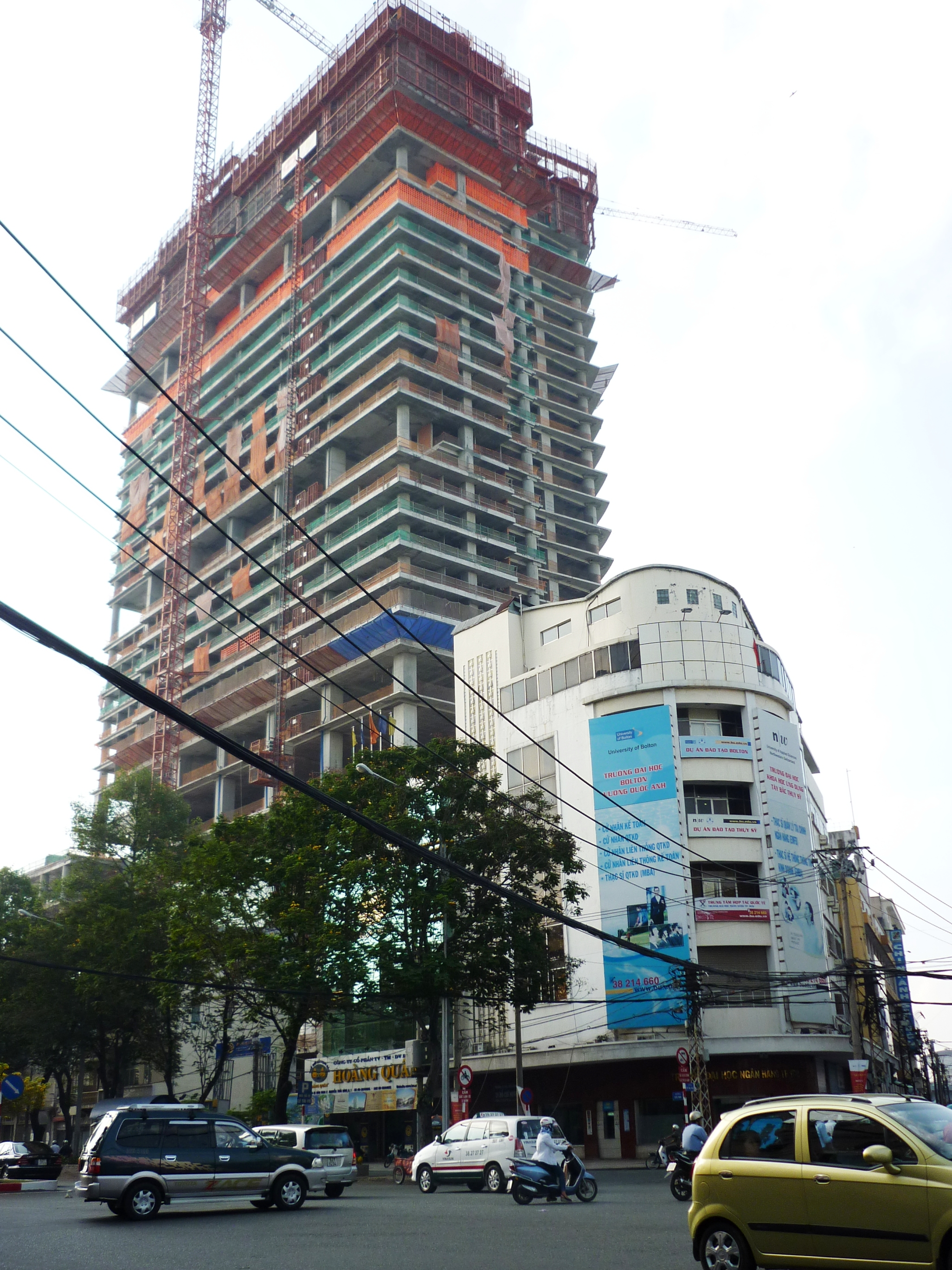
Former first embassy building in 2011 is now a campus of Ho Chi Minh University of Banking with its SaigonISB inside

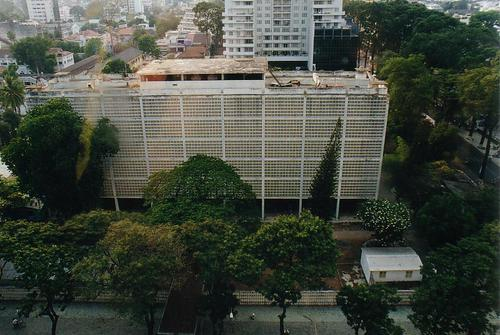
Former chancery building, from across Le Duan Boulevard, shortly before its demolition in April 1998

Shortly after taking Saigon on 30 April, North Vietnamese soldiers and intelligence officers went to the deserted embassy where they found numerous classified documents left behind. Most documents were shredded. Of those shredded, some were not burnt in time and the pieces were reconstituted and used to track down South Vietnamese employees of the U.S. government including of the Central Intelligence Agency. The embassy was also looted , "We entered through the broken back door of the embossy and started up the stairs. The reek of tear gas was almost overwhelming. Every room we looked it appeared to have been hit with a battering ram. The gas drove us back downstairs."

The embassy building as well as the UK embassy located across the street were used as the offices of the Vietnamese national oil company, PetroVietnam, throughout the 1980s.

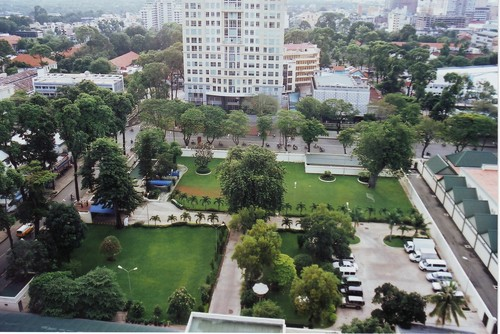
Site of embassy compound in 2003

Following the establishment of diplomatic relations between the United States and the Socialist Republic of Vietnam, a new U.S. embassy was opened in Hanoi in 1995 and the site of the former U.S. Embassy in Saigon was handed back to the U.S. government. It was decided that the former embassy building was unusable after more than 20 years of neglect in Vietnam's tropical climate, but also that because the history of the building itself carried such negative connotations, it did not fit with the new U.S.–Vietnam relationship. The former embassy building was demolished between the period of May and July 1998 during which two Vietnamese demolition workers died after falling several stories down an elevator shaft. The new Consulate-General was built on the old consular compound adjacent to the old embassy site. During the demolition of the embassy the ladder leading from the embassy rooftop to the helipad was removed and sent back to the United States, where it is now on display at the Gerald R. Ford Presidential Museum.

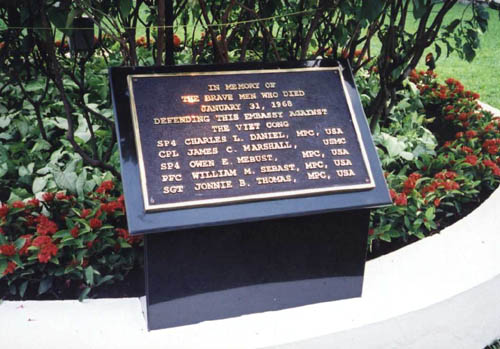
Plaque commemorating U.S. soldiers who died defending the embassy during the Tet Offensive

In early 1998, the Vietnamese government erected a red-stone memorial to the Viet Cong who fought in the embassy during the Tet offensive on the sidewalk outside the main gate of the former embassy compound which still remains there today. Before the demolition the U.S. Ambassador to Vietnam at the time, Pete Peterson, suggested that the former embassy site be used to earn money as the compound was in the middle of an expensive business district, and although there were discussions of building an office tower at the site to lease to private tenants, nothing was ever built.

Some visible remnants of the old embassy remain, most notably the large, round concrete planters which sat in front of the embassy and were used as firing positions by the Viet Cong during the Tet Offensive attack. Other remnants of the old embassy include a large banyan tree in the parking lot that dates back to the nineteenth century as well as a flagpole near the Le Duan entrance that was a gift from the Standard Oil Company in 1929 and has been used at all U.S. diplomatic missions in Saigon since then. The base of that flagpole is made of black granite salvaged from the old embassy building. The current site of the embassy building is now used for large receptions and soccer practice by the Consulate staff.

On 14 November 2002, a dedication ceremony was held for the replacement plaque commemorating the U.S. Marine security guard and the four military policemen who were killed defending the embassy. The original plaque was left at the embassy during the Fall of Saigon and was subsequently on display at the War Remnants Museum before disappearing.

== See also ==
- Consulate-General of the United States in Ho Chi Minh City
- Embassy of the United States, Mogadishu — US embassy which was hastily evacuated by airlift in 1991 during the civil war and only reopened in 2019
- Embassy of the United States, Kabul — US embassy which was hastily evacuated by airlift in 2021 during the Taliban takeover and has remained closed since
- List of ambassadors of the United States to South Vietnam
- United States–Vietnam relations
