= Fathi Eljahmi =

Libyan activist (1941–2009)

- Born: April 4, 1941
- Died: May 21, 2009 (aged 68); Amman, Jordan
- Known for: Political dissident

Fathi Eljahmi (Arabic: فتحي الجهمي) (4 April 1941 – 21 May 2009) was Libya's "most prominent democratic dissident" for three decades up until his death, and received significant international attention.

He was arrested in October 2002 and sentenced to five years in prison for stating at a 'People's Conference' in Tripoli that reform in Libya would require a constitution, free speech and democracy. He was briefly released in March 2004 after U.S. Senator Joe Biden met with Libyan leader Muammar Gaddafi, and then re-imprisoned after calling for democratization of Libya in a television interview. In early 2004 he, his wife, and his eldest son were taken into custody.

The Libyan government claimed that Eljahmi was put on trial in late 2005, accused of the capital charges of "trying to overthrow the government, insulting Col. Gaddafi and contacting foreign authorities, after he talked to a US diplomat." Physicians for Human Rights reported at the time that he was receiving inadequate care for heart disease and diabetes. During her visit to Libya, the United States Secretary of State Condoleezza Rice pleaded for Eljahmi's release from solitary detention. Eljahmi remained imprisoned. Writing in Forbes in 2009, Fathi's brother Mohamed criticised the lack of support that Eljahmi had received from human rights organisations, stating that "for nearly a year, both Amnesty International and Human Rights Watch hesitated to advocate publicly for Fathi's case, because they feared their case workers might lose access to Libyan visas."

Eljahmi died on 21 May 2009 in Amman, Jordan, where he had been evacuated for emergency medical treatment after falling into a coma in Libyan custody.
