= Ronell Renett Klopper =

South African botanist

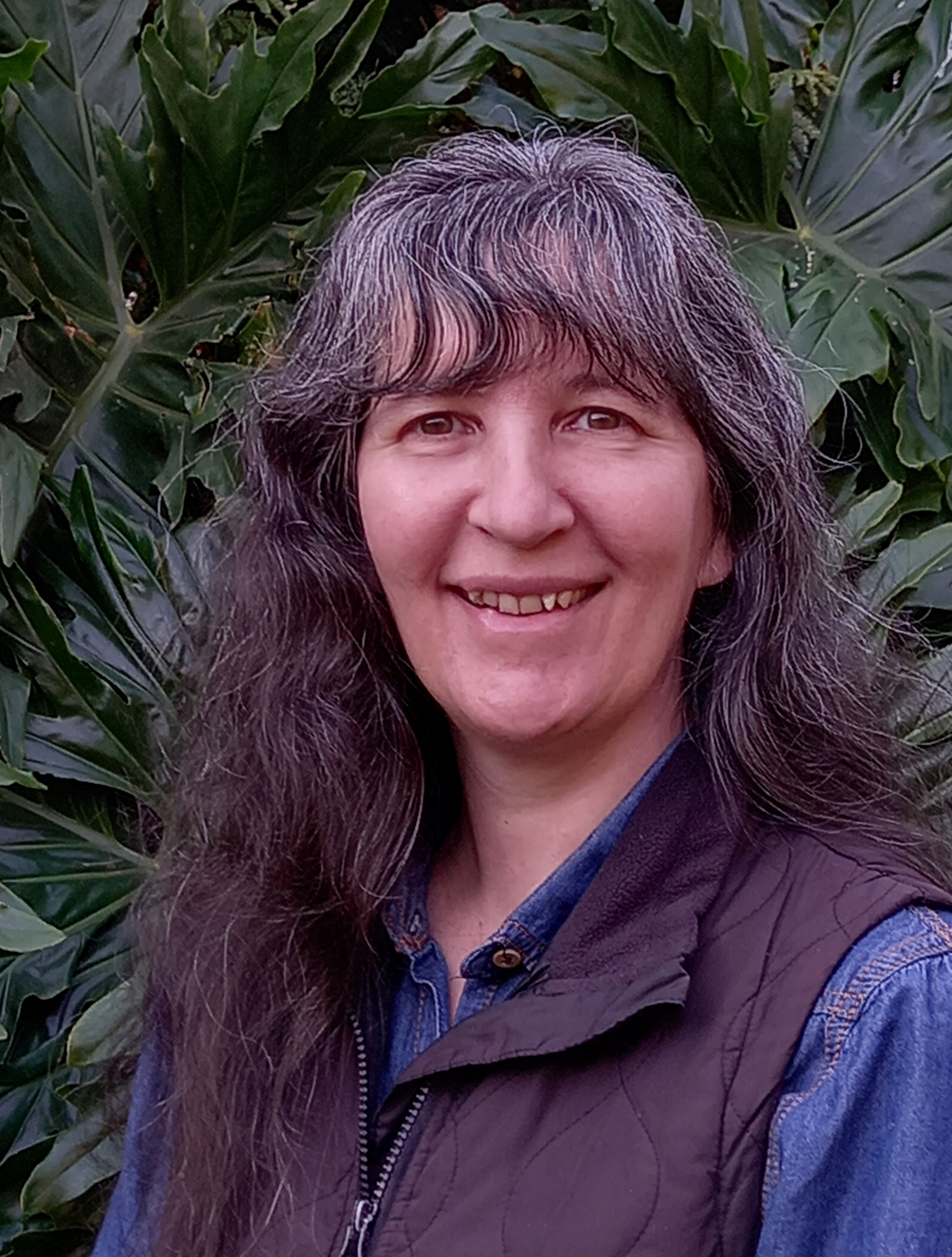
- Ronell Renett Klopper in 2025
- Born: 1974 (age 51–52); Gauteng, South Africa
- Education: University of Pretoria
- Known for: Studying aloes Coordinator for the South African National Plant Checklist of the South African National Biodiversity Institute
- Scientific career
- Fields: Botany
- Author abbrev. (botany): Klopper

Ronell Renett Klopper (born 1974) is a South African botanist. She has been the coordinator for the South African National Plant Checklist in the Fundamental Biodiversity Sciences Division of the South African National Biodiversity Institute (SANBI) since 2014. Klopper is responsible for keeping the plant checklist up to date and for liaising with the Biodiversity Information Management Unit of SANBI for its online distribution. This checklist forms the taxonomic backbone for numerous projects, and for management and conversation planning activities. She curates the Lycopodiophyta, Pteridophyta and Asphodelaceae collections of the National Herbarium in Pretoria and conducts research on these groups. Klopper is currently rated by the National Research Foundation as a C3 scientist, or "Established Researcher".

The standard author abbreviation Klopper is used to indicate this person as the author when citing a botanical name.

== Background and education ==
Klopper (née Visser) was born on 26 January 1974 in Randfontein, Gauteng. She obtained a Bachelor of Science in Natural Sciences at the University of Pretoria in 1994 and a Bachelor of Science in botany at the same university in 1995. She then obtained a master's degree in Plant Taxonomy at the University of Pretoria in 2000. Klopper obtained a Ph.D. in botany in 2015. Her Ph.D. thesis, entitled Contributions to the systematics of the genus Aloe L. in Southern Africa, stems from her involvement in the Aloes of the World project and provides a synthesis of knowledge of the 210 aloes found in Southern Africa.
