= Lý Tự Trọng =

Vietnamese nationalist

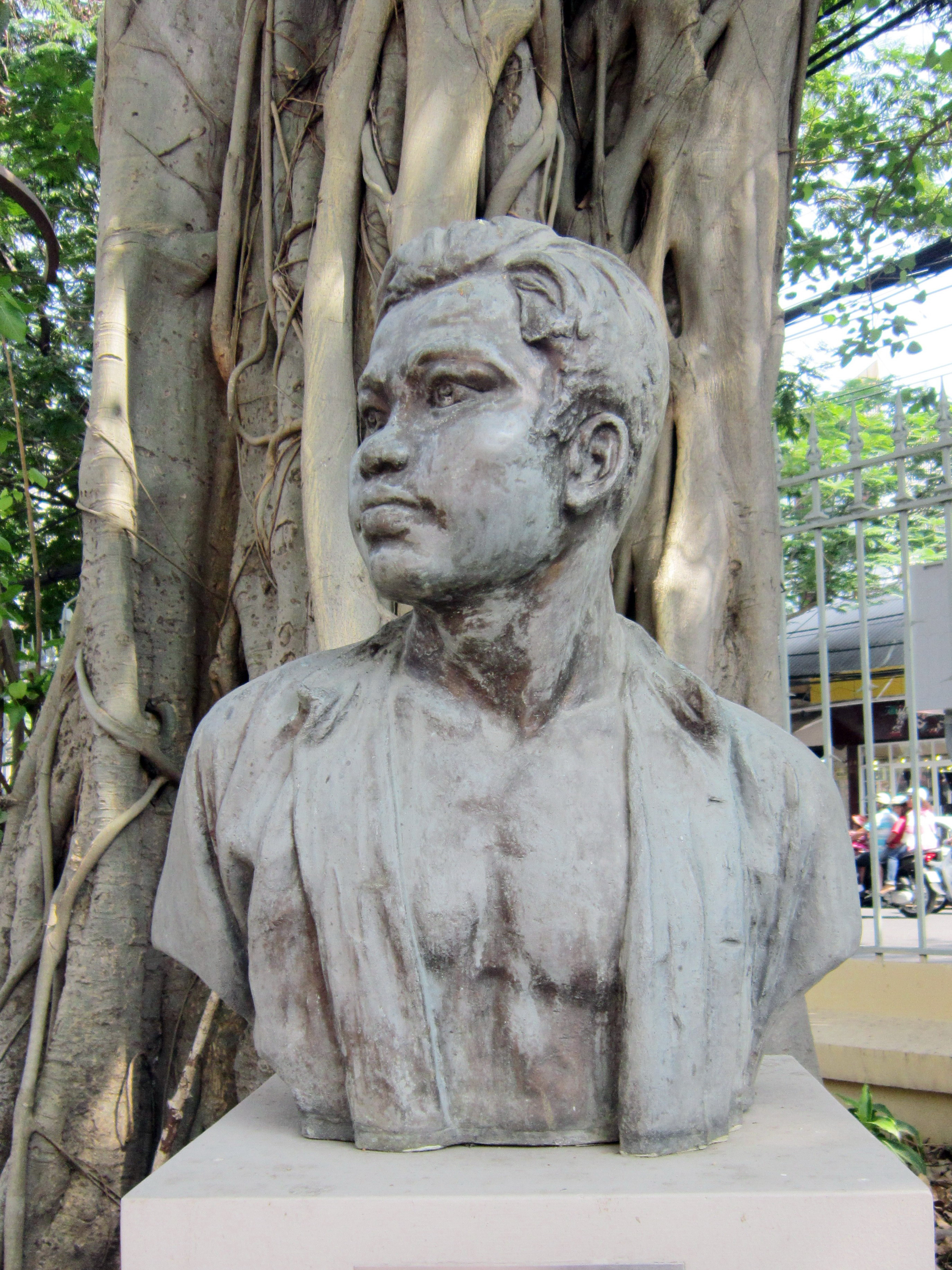
Statue of Lý Tự Trọng in Ho Chi Minh City Museum of Fine Arts.

Lý Tự Trọng (20 October 1914 in Thailand – 21 November 1931 in Saigon; born Lê Hữu Trọng) was a Vietnamese revolutionary, executed by the French when he was only 17 years old. He is considered to be a revolutionary martyr. In 2010, his remains were identified in District 10, Ho Chi Minh City, and he was reburied in his parents' home town, the Việt Xuyên commune in the district of Thạch Hà.

On 9 February 1931, during a rally in Le Grand Park in Saigon, celebrating the anniversary of the Yên Bái uprising, Trọng used a firearm to shoot at anti-Communist French secret police. He did that to protect Phan Bôi, who was speaking at the rally. There was a fear Phan Bôi would be assassinated, due to the inflammatory and Marxist-oriented content of his speech. He fled south as a fugitive. Trọng was arrested 10 days later in the town of Khám lớn Cần Thơ, about 160 kilometres (100 mi) south-west of Saigon. He was brought back to Saigon, hastily tried by French officials, sentenced to death on 20 November 1931, and executed the next day.

The execution of Trọng sparked strong feelings of anger amongst Communists all over Vietnam toward the French leadership. Trọng was viewed as a martyr and his fate was seen as symbolic of French brutality.

Lý Tự Trọng street in Saigon is named after him, replacing the street's original name, Gia Long street, given by the previous South Vietnamese government, commemorating the 18th century Vietnamese emperor who overthrew the Tây Sơn dynasty, invited French forces to Vietnam and started the whole colonial process of the country. The street includes the former US AID building, famous as one of the locations of the helicopter evacuation U.S government employees during the Fall of Saigon in 1975.
