= Hester Klopper =

South African Academician

Hester Klopper (born in Pretoria) is a South African professor of global health and the 15th Vice-Chancellor and a principal at the University of the Free State (UTS), Bloemfontein. She is the author of the book titled The State of Nursing and Nursing Education in Africa, published in 2013.

== Education ==
Klopper completed her secondary education at Hoërskool Alberton in 1981. She began her tertiary studies in education at the former Rand Afrikaans University (RAU) but later changed to nursing, earning a diploma in General Nursing and Midwifery from the Ann Latsky Nursing College. In February 1986, she completed her final examinations in Psychiatric Nursing Science and, that same year, enrolled at the University of South Africa to study Community Health, Nursing Education, and Nursing Management. She obtained a master's degree in Nursing Education (MCu) from Rand Afrikaans University (RAU) in 1992 and completed a PhD in Health Sciences in 1994.

== Career ==
In 1990, Klopper entered the private sector as an educational consultant with Clinic Holdings Ltd, a role she held until her transition to RAU in 1993. In 1997, she co-founded the Open Learning Group (OLG Health Academy) with a colleague. She later became a lecturer and served on the RAU Alumni Executive Committee from 1998 to 2003. In 2003, while in Canada, she was appointed by the Sigma president to serve on the international governance committee. In 2005, she joined North-West University in Potchefstroom as director of the School of Nursing Sciences. She was elected director in 2007 and held the position until 2011. From 2018 to 2022, she served as chairperson of the Global Advisory Panel on the Future of Nursing (GAPFON). Klopper served as chairperson and CEO of the Forum for University Nursing Deans of South Africa and the leader of Sigma Theta Tau International Honor Society of Nursing. She was a former deputy vice-Chancellor at Stellenbosch University and in 2025 she was appointed as the Vice Chancellor of the University of the Free State.

== Awards ==
- 2026 Forbes Woman Africa Academic Excellence Award
- The Fellowship Ad Eundem prestigious award
