= Brian Grove =

Australian cricketer

Personal information
- Born: 23 February 1921; Adelaide, South Australia
- Died: 1 May 2009 (aged 88); Adelaide, South Australia
- Batting: Right-handed
- Bowling: Right-arm fast
- Source: Cricinfo, 6 August 2020

Brian Grove (23 February 1921 – 1 May 2009) was an Australian cricketer. He played in three first-class matches for South Australia during the 1952–53 season. Grove also played for the Sturt Cricket Club, including in the South Australian premiership final in 1950.
