= Antonio Chocano =

Guatemalan fencer (1913–2009)

Antonio Chocano Batres

Personal information
- Born: 17 March 1913 Guatemala City, Guatemala
- Died: 16 May 2009 (aged 96) Guatemala City, Guatemala

Sport
- Sport: Fencing

Antonio Chocano (7 March 1913 – 16 May 2009) was a Guatemalan diplomat and fencer. He competed in the individual épée event at the 1952 Summer Olympics.
