= Roy Kline (footballer) =

Australian rules footballer, born 1915

Personal information
- Full name: Roy Kline
- Born: 8 June 1915
- Died: 11 May 2009 (aged 93)
- Original team: Elsternwick Amateurs
- Height: 175 cm (5 ft 9 in)
- Weight: 69 kg (152 lb)

Playing career^{1}
Years	Club	Games (Goals)
1939	St Kilda	3 (0)
- ^{1} Playing statistics correct to the end of 1939.

Roy Kline (8 June 1915 – 11 May 2009) was an Australian rules footballer who played with St Kilda in the Victorian Football League (VFL).
