= Richardene Kloppers =

Namibian teacher (b. 1926, d. 2009)

Richardine Kloppers
- Born: 5 January 1926; Keetmanshoop, Namibia
- Died: 16 May 2009 (aged 83); Windhoek, Namibia
- Known for: First black female teacher in Namibia
- Children: 15
- Parent(s): Francis and Sam Poulton

Richardine Maria Kloppers (5 January 1926 – 16 May 2009) was a Namibian teacher.

== Early life ==
She was born to Sam and Francis Poulton on 5 January 1926, in Keetmanshoop, Namibia. She was the eldest of eleven siblings in her working-class family. Richardine attended the Roman Catholic Mission school in Tseiblaagte and learned in the language of Nama until Standard 4 (grade 6 in US). She became a graduate at St. Augustine Teachers College (Parow, Cape town). Upon returning to Namibia she began teaching at Gibeon and became the first qualified black female teacher in Namibia.

== Career ==
Along with her husband Andrew Kloopers, in 1956 Richardine opened up one of the first non-racial schools in Khomasdal. Andrew served as principal from 1957 to 1966. During the time of the school opening the National Party of South Africa had a strict policy on racial segregation and the apartheid administration deemed that the school was "against the law". The school opened regardless and still operates. Richardine Kloppers had 15 children and died three months after a stomach cancer diagnosis.
