= John Brown Jr. (Navajo code talker) =

American Navajo Code Talker (1921–2009)

John Brown Jr. (December 24, 1921 – May 20, 2009) was an American Navajo Code Talker during World War II.

== Biography ==
John Brown Jr. was born on December 24, 1921, in Chinle, Arizona, the son of Nonabah Begay and John Brown. He was educated at the Chinle Boarding School and graduated from Albuquerque Indian School in 1940. Brown recalled that students were only allowed to speak English at school and were punished if they used the Navajo language.

Following the bombing of Pearl Harbor, Brown joined the United States Marine Corps in 1942. He underwent basic training at Camp Pendleton. He was among the original 29 Navajo code talkers who devised the original code. During the war, he served in battles at Guadalcanal, Saipan, Tarawa, and Tinian.

Brown trained as a welder and was a master carpenter as well as a cabinetmaker. He served as a member of the Navajo Tribal Council from 1962 to 1982. He was president of the Crystal Chapter for three terms. Brown was then a traditional counselor for the Division of Social Services of the Navajo Nation, retiring in 2001.

Brown and his wife Loncie Polacca Brown were the parents of seven children. He was a member of the Church of Jesus Christ of Latter-day Saints. Brown was one of the code talkers who received the Congressional Gold Medal from President George W. Bush on July 26, 2001. Brown was interviewed by the National Museum of the American Indian in 2004.

Brown died on May 20, 2009, at his home in Crystal, New Mexico.
