= Erik Bluemel =

American university lecturer (1977–2009)

Erik Brandon Bluemel
- Born: March 2, 1977; Arcadia, California
- Died: May 6, 2009 (aged 32)
- Occupation: assistant professor at the University of Denver Sturm College of Law

Erik Brandon Bluemel (March 2, 1977 – May 6, 2009) was an assistant professor at the University of Denver Sturm College of Law and a scholar in the fields of environmental law, indigenous peoples law, and global administrative law. He held a J.D. from New York University School of Law, an L.L.M. from Georgetown University Law Center, and a B.A. in political economy from the University of California-Berkeley. Professor Bluemel died from injuries sustained after a bicycle accident in the early morning on May 6, 2009.

== Early life ==
Bluemel was born on March 2, 1977, in Arcadia, California.

== Prior legal employment ==
Prior to joining the faculty at the University of Denver Sturm College of Law in 2008, he clerked for Barefoot Sanders in the United States District Court for the Northern District of Texas and Kermit Edward Bye in the Eighth Circuit Court of Appeals. He also served as a staff attorney and teaching fellow at Georgetown University Law Center's Institute for Public Representation, where he represented dozens of national and local groups on administrative, environmental, and public land law issues.

== High-profile cases ==
Some of the higher profile cases he worked on while at the Institute for Public Representation included representing groups who challenged various aspects of the Intercounty Connector, groups who challenged the development of a wind farm in a corridor used by protected migratory birds, and groups seeking environmental restoration of Poplar Point, a portion of the Anacostia National Park, among other projects.

== Courses taught ==
At the University of Denver, he taught Administrative Law, Environmental Law, and Indigenous Peoples in International Law. His research interests included environmental federalism, climate governance, global administrative law, identity-based social movements, and environmental rights.

== Community service ==
He served on the United Nations Development Programme Task Force on Access and Benefit-Sharing and Traditional Knowledge, as a member of the board of directors of Arlingtonians for a Clean Environment, and as vice-chair of the New York County Lawyers' Association Environmental Law Committee. He was a member of the Commission on Environmental Law of the International Union on the Conservation of Nature (IUCN). He also served as a member of the board of advisors for The Ocean Foundation, and as vice-president of the board of directors for Keystone Conservation.

== Scholarship ==
His scholarship includes articles on the global warming regime complex, regional greenhouse gas regulatory regimes in the United States, regulation of alternative energies, administrative law, environmental rights, protection of sacred sites and cultural property, and indigenous peoples' participatory rights in international law, among other topics.
