= Hue–Da Nang Campaign =

Part of the Vietnam War (1975)

- Part of the 1975 spring offensive in the Vietnam War
- A People's Army of Vietnam T-54 tank entering Da Nang in 1975.
Date	March 5 – April 2, 1975 (4 weeks)
Location	Huế (Thừa Thiên-Huế Province), Da Nang (Quảng Nam Province), Quảng Trị Province, Quảng Ngãi Province, South Vietnam
Result	North Vietnamese and Viet Cong victory; South Vietnamese retreat to Saigon; North Vietnam and the Viet Cong gain control of Northern South Vietnam; Collapse of I Corps; Beginning of the US-led Operation Babylift in Saigon

Belligerents
North Vietnam (Provisional Revolutionary Government of the Republic of South Vietnam) Viet Cong	South Vietnam

Commanders and leaders
Lê Trọng Tấn; Nguyễn Hữu An; Lê Tự Đồng; Chu Huy Mân	Ngô Quang Trưởng

Units involved
2nd Corps	I Corps

Strength
4 infantry divisions 5 infantry regiments 4 infantry battalions 1 independent brigade 1 armoured regiment 3 artillery regiments 1 air-defence division 1 combat engineers brigade 1 communications regiment Total: ~ Over 75,000 men 60 tanks 103 heavy artillery pieces.	3 infantry divisions 1 airborne division 1 marine corps division 4 ranger groups 1 armoured brigade 5 armoured squadrons 1 air force division 2 navy squadrons Total: ~134,000 men 513 tanks and AFVs; 418 heavy artillery pieces 373 aircraft 165 warships

Casualties and losses
9,000 killed or wounded	30,000 killed or wounded, 100,000+ captured or dispersed 129 aircraft, 179 tanks and armored vehicles, 327 artillery pieces, 184 transport vehicles, 47 naval craft were captured

The Hue–Da Nang Campaign was a series of military actions conducted by the People's Army of Vietnam (PAVN) against the Army of the Republic of Vietnam (ARVN) during the Vietnam War, also known in Vietnam as the American War. The campaign was centred on the cities of Huế (Thừa Thiên-Huế Province) and Da Nang (Quảng Nam Province), with secondary fronts in the provinces of Quảng Trị and Quảng Ngãi. The campaign began on March 5 and concluded on April 2, 1975.

During the spring season of 1975, the PAVN High Command in Hanoi made the decision to seize the major South Vietnamese cities of Huế and Da Nang, and also destroy the various South Vietnamese units in I Corps Tactical Zone, led by ARVN General Ngô Quang Trưởng. Originally, the campaign was planned to take place over two phases; during the seasons of spring-summer and autumn. However, as the North Vietnamese forces rolled over South Vietnamese defences on the outskirts of Huế and Da Nang, President Nguyễn Văn Thiệu ordered General Trưởng to abandon all territories under his control, and pull his forces back to the coastal areas of I Corps. The South Vietnamese withdrawal quickly turned into a rout, as the PAVN 2nd Army Corps picked off one South Vietnamese unit after another, until Huế and Da Nang were completely surrounded. By March 29, 1975, PAVN troops had full control of Huế and Da Nang, while South Vietnam lost all territories and most of the units belonging to I Corps.

On March 31, ARVN General Phạm Văn Phú—commander of II Corps Tactical Zone—attempted to form a new defensive line from Qui Nhơn to cover the retreat of the ARVN 22nd Infantry Division, but they too were destroyed by the PAVN. By April 2, South Vietnam had lost control of the northern provinces, as well as two army corps.

== Background ==
=== North Vietnam ===
During the Huế–Da Nang Campaign of 1975, North Vietnamese and Viet Cong (VC) forces were organised into three formations; the PAVN 2nd Corps, Tri Thien Military Zone, and Military Region 5 Command. The 2nd Corps fielded three infantry divisions (304th, 324B and 325C Divisions), the 673rd Air-Defence Division, the 164th Artillery Brigade, the 203rd Armoured Regiment, the 219th Combat Engineers Brigade, and the 463rd Communications Regiment. The 2nd Corps was led by Major-General Nguyễn Hữu An, with Major-General Le Linh as Political Commissar. Colonel Hoang Dan was the deputy commander, and Colonel Nguyen Cong Trang was the deputy political commissar.

Led by Major-General Lê Tự Đồng, the Tri Thien Military Zone had three infantry regiments (4th, 46th and 271st Regiments), and two battalions (the 21st Independent Battalion and the 6th Local Force Battalion). Military Region 5 had one infantry division (2nd Division), which was supported by the 141st Regiment (from the 3rd Division), the 52nd Independent Brigade, two artillery regiments (368th and 572nd Artillery Regiments), two local battalions (70th and 72nd Local Force Battalions), and two local regiments (94th and 96th Local Force Regiments). North Vietnamese and Viet Cong units of Military Region 5 were placed under the responsibility of Major-General Chu Huy Mân, with Vo Chi Cong as political commissar.

=== Objectives ===
==== Tri Thien ====
On February 21, 1975, PAVN field commanders from Tri-Thien Military Zone and the 2nd Army Corps held a conference to establish their objectives, which were planned to occur in two phases; the spring-summer phase that would begin in March and probably conclude in May, and the autumn phase to last from July to August 1975. The PAVN objective was to take control of Quảng Trị Province, isolate the city of Huế and, if the opportunity presented itself, capture the entire Tri Thien-Huế area. To isolate Huế, the PAVN 2nd Army Corps would move against their target from the north-west direction along Route 12 down to the south-west along Highway 14, thereby isolating the region from South Vietnamese forces in II Corps Tactical Zone.

In preparation for the Huế–Da Nang Campaign, the PAVN 2nd Army Corps had successfully captured several important base areas that surrounded South Vietnamese units in Quảng Trị Province and Thừa Thiên Province. Those areas included Đông Hà–Ái Tử to the north, Khe Sanh-Ba Long to the west, and A Lưới-Nam Dong in southern Huế. The main body of the 304th Division and the 3rd Regiment, 324th Division, had assembled in Nong Son and Thường Đức to attack Da Nang from the west. In Military Region 5, the 2nd Division had established its positions in Tiên Phước, Tra My and Trà Bồng in Quảng Ngãi Province, and Đắk Tô and Tân Cảnh in Kon Tum Province.

==== Quảng Tin-Quảng Ngãi ====
Once Huế had been isolated, Military Region 5 Command would initiate the Tin-Ngai Campaign from the provinces of Quảng Tin and Quảng Ngãi, to isolate Da Nang from the Central Highlands. PAVN units such as the 2nd Division, the 141st Regiment, the 52nd Brigade, along with two artillery regiments (368th and 572nd Artillery Regiments) would coordinate their efforts with the VC 94th and 96th Local Force Regiments, and the 70th and 72nd Local Force Battalions. As part of their overall objective, they would tie down the ARVN 2nd Division, the 11th Armoured Squadron and the 912th Regional Force Company in Quảng Ngãi Province, and, if the opportunity arose, they would also capture Bình Định Province and the city of Qui Nhơn.

==== Da Nang ====
In the final phase of their operation, the PAVN and VC would cut off Da Nang from the surrounding regions which made up I Corps Tactical Zone, and prevent reinforcements from retaking the city. Then, depending on the situation, the PAVN would organize an attack to capture the major South Vietnamese army, navy and air force installations in the city.

=== South Vietnam ===
South Vietnamese military forces in Huế and Da Nang belonged to the ARVN I Corps Tactical Zone. Commanded by Lieutenant General Ngô Quang Trưởng, the South Vietnamese I Corps was considered to be the strongest amongst all the military formations of South Vietnam. It had three infantry divisions (1st, 2nd and 3rd Infantry Divisions), the Airborne Division (led by Major General Le Quang Luong), the Marine Division (led by Major General Bui The Lan) and the 11th, 12th, 14th and 15th Ranger Groups. The Airborne and Marine Divisions each had an assigned strength of four brigades. In addition to the infantry units, there were also the 5th Armoured Brigade, five squadrons of armored vehicles (4th, 7th, 11th, 17th and 20th Armored Squadrons), 13 armored companies, and 21 artillery battalions.

Local defense in I Corps was provided by 50 battalions and five companies of Regional and Popular Forces, and six companies of military police. Support for ground forces in the area came in the form of the Republic of Vietnam Air Force (RVNAF) 1st Air Force Division (commanded by Brigadier-General Nguyen Van Khanh), with two Republic of Vietnam Navy squadrons operating on the coast and another two along the rivers. Overall, I Corps fielded about 134,000 soldiers; 84,000 were regular soldiers and 50,000 belonged to the Regional and Popular Forces. Those forces were equipped with 449 tanks and armored vehicles, 418 artillery pieces, 64 M42 Duster light air-defense weapons, 373 aircraft of different types, and 165 naval vessels of different sizes.

=== Defensive strategy ===
In combination with the ‘Ly Thuong Kiet Military Plan’ and experiences gained during the North Vietnamese Easter Offensive, Trưởng organised the defenses of I Corps into three phases, to be staged from three different areas.

==== Defensive phases ====
The first phase, known as the ‘orange phase’, was considered to be the most important because it provided South Vietnamese units in I Corps with a platform to stop enemy attacks, and even attack them if necessary. To accomplish the objectives of the ‘orange phase’, Trưởng placed several elite combat units such as the Ranger groups and armoured forces on constant combat alert. The second phase, known as the ‘green phase’, was designed to delay enemy forces and buy more time for the South Vietnamese to regroup in order to stage a counter-attack, in the scenario that enemy forces managed to overcome the ‘orange phase’. In the final phase, or the ‘blue phases’, require South Vietnamese units to secure their areas of defence, then destroy and push enemy forces out of I Corps.

==== Areas of defence ====
Trưởng's areas of defence were centred on Tri Thien-Huế, Da Nang, and Quảng Nam-Quảng Ngãi.

==== Tri Thien-Huế ====
The task of holding Tri Thien and Huế was entrusted to the 1st Division, the 4th and 15th Ranger Groups, the 913th and 914th Regional Forces Companies, the 17th and 20th Armoured Squadrons, 10 artillery battalions, one squadron of helicopters, two squadrons of reconnaissance aircraft, and one coastal patrol squadron. Those forces were commanded by Lieutenant general Lâm Quang Thi.

==== Nam-Da Nang ====
Da Nang was under the direct responsibility of Trưởng. It was home of the 3rd Division, the 4th and 7th Armoured Squadrons, the 11th and 14th Ranger Groups, the 911th Regional Force Company, the 1st Air Force Division, one coastal patrol squadron and two riverine squadrons.

==== Quảng Tin-Quảng Ngãi ====
Quảng Tin and Quảng Ngãi was held by the 2nd Division, the 12th Ranger Group, the 11th Armoured Squadron, three artillery battalions, the 912th Regional Force Company, one coastal patrol squadron and one riverine squadron. Brigadier-General Trần Văn Nhựt commanded the 3rd Infantry Division, and all other units in Quảng Nam and Quảng Ngãi.

== Prelude ==
On March 5, 1975, the PAVN 2nd Army Corps officially commenced its campaign against South Vietnamese forces of I Corps. The opening shots of the campaign was marked by an attack on South Vietnamese military convoys on the Hai Van Pass and the destruction of An Lo Bridge on Highway 1, located north of Huế. Positions held by the ARVN 913th Regional Force at Dong Ong Do and Hill 368 also came under attack, as Phu Bai Airbase was subjected to intense artillery bombardment. While the South Vietnamese were busy dealing with those attacks, General Nguyen Huu An secretly redeployed the 325th Division and the 9th Regiment of the 304th Division, from Quảng Trị towards Huế in the south. The 46th and 271st Regiments then moved into positions previously held by the 325th Division and 9th Regiment. In order to fool South Vietnamese intelligence agencies, the North Vietnamese moved tank and artillery units to Cua Viet, Thanh Hoi and Ai Tu to cover their main thrust.

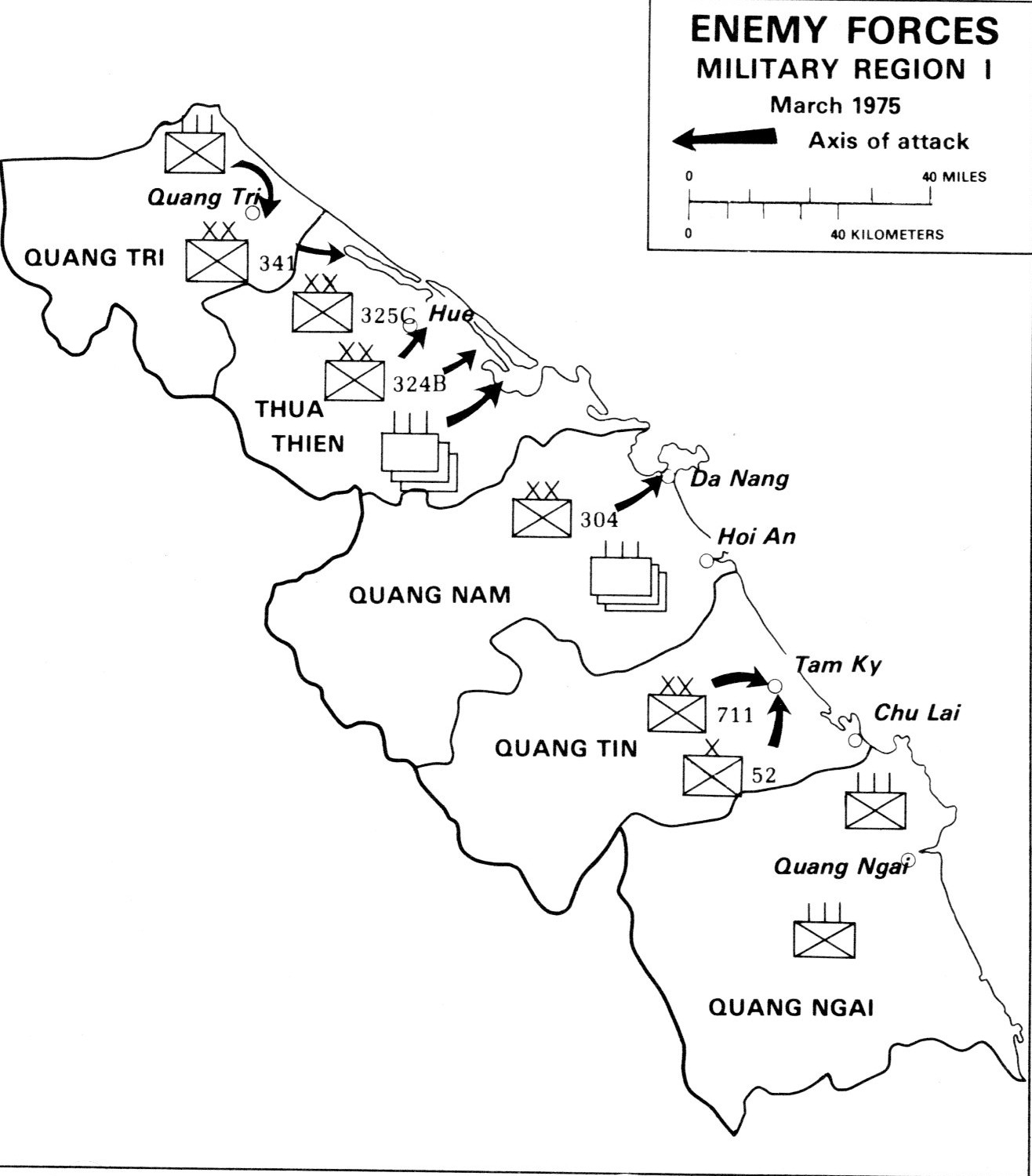
Movement of North Vietnamese units in I Corps Tactical Zone

Between March 6 and 7, the VC 4th Local Force Battalion assaulted and overran Mai Linh and 11 other surrounding military sub-sectors in Quảng Trị Province. On the following day, General Lâm requested reinforcements from General Trưởng in Da Nang, as a response to PAVN attacks in his area of control. Meanwhile, the PAVN 2nd Army Corps continued their onslaught, with the 324th Division launching attacks on South Vietnamese positions on Núi Bong (16.286°N 107.742°E) and Núi Mô Tau (16.307°N 107.66°E) and on Hills 75, 76, 224 (16.275°N 107.747°E), 273 (16.26°N 107.73°E) and 303 all located near Phú Lộc, south of Huế and north of the Hai Van Pass.

By March 10, the 1st Battalion, 54th Infantry Regiment, 1st Division was destroyed on Hills 224 and 273; the ARVN 47th Armoured Squadron was overrun by the PAVN 1st Regiment, 324th Division, on Mount Nghe; and the ARVN 113th Regional Force Battalion conceded Pho Lai to the PAVN 4th Regiment, which was supported by the 223rd Artillery Regiment. Thi then ordered the 15th Ranger Group and the 2nd Battalion, 54th Infantry Regiment, with support from the 27th and 37th Tank Squadrons, to mount a counter-attack on Hill 224. Over the period of one week, both sides fired over 8,000 rounds of artillery shells on Hill 224, and the RVNAF conducted over 60 bombing sorties in an attempt to halt the advances of the PAVN 2nd Corps.

On March 13, amidst heavy fighting in the northern provinces, Trưởng flew to Saigon for a meeting with President Nguyễn Văn Thiệu. In this meeting, Thiệu outlined his decision to abandon most of the provinces in I Corps, and ordered Trưởng to withdraw his forces towards the coastal regions of central Vietnam instead. In addition, the Airborne Division would be redeployed to the Mekong Delta region, where it could protect the nation's capital. Unwilling to concede the northern provinces to the enemy, Trưởng tried unsuccessfully to convince Thiệu to reverse his decision in the belief that he could hold onto I Corps, and recapture lost territories by using the Airborne and Marine Corps Divisions. After he returned to his headquarters that afternoon, Trưởng decided to redeploy his forces instead of carrying out Thiệu's order straightaway, for several reasons. Firstly, he wanted to convince the President that most South Vietnamese units were still intact and that they still had the time to recapture lost territories, and secondly, Trưởng did not want to create confusion amongst his subordinates, when the military situation in I Corps was still under control.

Thus, Trưởng reorganised his defences in order to deal with the threat posed by PAVN formations located south of I Corps; he designated Da Nang to be the main centre of South Vietnamese defence in I Corps, with Tri Thien in the north, and with Quảng Nam and Quảng Ngãi in the south. To make up for the loss of the Airborne Division, Trưởng ordered the 369th Marine Brigade to replace the 3rd Airborne Brigade in Quảng Nam Province, and the 258th Marine Brigade to take over from the 2nd Airborne Brigade on Mount Phu Gia, located north of Hai Van.

Meanwhile, between March 13 and 15, the PAVN 6th Regiment launched several attacks on Chuc Meo, La Son, Hill 300 and Hill 511 located west of Huế, forcing elements of the ARVN 1st Infantry Division to pull back towards Dong Tranh and Binh Dien.

On March 17, the PAVN High Command predicted that South Vietnamese units could withdraw into the cities of Huế and Da Nang, so the following orders were issued to PAVN field commanders: General Lê Tự Đồng's forces were to capture Phu Bai Air Base to prevent aerial transportation, and cut off a section of Highway 1 north of Huế, and General Nguyen Huu An's 2nd Army Corps must secure Highway 1 south of the city, with the aim of isolating both Huế and Da Nang from the rest of the country.

On the following day, Đồng's forces staged their attacks from two main directions, from Thanh Hoi and Tich Tuong-Nhu Le, moving along Route 68 and National Highway 1 respectively. The 2nd Corps, on the other hand, assaulted South Vietnamese positions in Phu Loc and Phu Gia.

By 20:30 on March 18, most of northern Quảng Trị was under North Vietnamese control. ARVN Colonel Do Ky, also the provincial chief of Quảng Trị Province, tried to lead what was left of his troops back to Huế but was pursued by the North Vietnamese along National Highway 1 until they reached An Lo.

As the fighting in Quảng Trị unfolded, Trưởng flew back from Saigon where he tried to obtain approval from Thiệu for his new defensive plan, and hastily reorganised South Vietnamese defences in the northern regions of I Corps. Subsequently, Trưởng sent out the following orders: the 480th Marine Brigade to leave Da Nang and to guard the north-western flank of Huế; the 1st Infantry Division, the 15th Ranger Group and the 7th Tank Squadron to protect south-western Huế; and the 258th Marine Brigade and the 914th Regional Force Battalion were to secure a section of Highway 1 which connected Huế with Da Nang.

== Battle ==
=== Fall of Huế ===
While Trưởng was still busy reorganising South Vietnamese units in I Corps, on March 20 the Tri Thien Command finalised their plan to capture Huế, with the objective of preventing South Vietnamese forces from regrouping there. At 14:30 on the same day, Thiệu phoned the ARVN I Corps Headquarters and ordered Trưởng to defend only Da Nang due to the lack of resources. Beginning at 05:40 on March 21, the PAVN 325th and 324th Divisions attacked South Vietnamese units positioned astride Highway 1. At the same time, elements of the K5 Special Forces Battalion destroyed Thua Luu Bridge, which connected a stretch of road on Highway 1 between Huế and Da Nang, forcing thousands of South Vietnamese civilian and military vehicles heading towards Da Nang to turn back. The ARVN 20th Tank Squadron was then sent out to reopen Highway 1, but was defeated by the PAVN 203rd Armoured Regiment.

In light of the worsening military situation on the evening of March 22, Trưởng authorised Thi to pull his forces back to Da Nang. However, as the main roads were blocked by the PAVN, Thi's only option was to use a coastal corridor between Thuận An and Tu Hien, and board transport vessels belonging to the 106th Navy Squadron and head back to Da Nang.

On the morning of March 23, the PAVN 324th Division advanced through Hill-303 and Núi Mô Tau, and assaulted northern Phu Loc, while the PAVN 325th Division captured Mui Ne, Phuoc Tuong, and encircled Tu Hien located south of Huế. In the north, the VC 4th, 46th and 271st Regiments pursued a retreating South Vietnamese formation consisted of the 147th Marine Brigade, the 14th Ranger Group, 5th Infantry Regiment, 1st Infantry Division and the 17th Armoured Squadron, heading towards Thuận An. At 16:30 on March 23, the PAVN 101st Regiment, 325th Division overran Luong Dien and surrounded Phu Bai Airbase, to close the main corridor leading into Huế from the south. Simultaneously, the VC 46th Regiment destroyed South Vietnamese defences on Bo River, captured the districts of Quang Dien, Quang Loi and Hương Can and secured the main roads on the outskirts of northern Huế.

People's Army of Vietnam soldiers entering the old Imperial City, Huế, in 1975

Between March 24 and 25, the PAVN 3rd and 101st Regiments continued their drive towards Huế, after they successfully captured Phu Bai Airbase. At the same time, the 1st Regiment, 324th Division along with the VC 4th and 271st Regiments were able to destroy the last elements of the 147th Marine Brigade and the 15th Ranger Group, before they could board navy vessels anchored off the shores of Hương Thuy, Luong Thien and Ke Sung and Cu Lai.

By the evening of March 25, the PAVN had secured all major points surrounding Huế, and South Vietnamese units that failed to escape were completely surrounded. Consequently, the PAVN claimed to have captured large numbers of South Vietnamese prisoners and military hardware. In all, a total of 58,722 South Vietnamese soldiers became prisoners of war, with one colonel and 18 lieutenant-colonels amongst the ranks, as well as about 14,000 South Vietnamese government officials and employees, who reported to the PAVN authorities. The South Vietnamese military in Huế also surrendered vast quantities of weaponry, which included 140 tanks and armoured vehicles.

=== Tin-Ngai Campaign ===
Beginning at 04:30 on March 10, PAVN and VC forces proceeded to capture the following targets: the PAVN 38th Regiment overran the highpoints of Nui Vu, Nui Ngoc, Duong Con, Soui Da and Nui Vy; the 36th Regiment destroyed South Vietnamese strong points at Trung Lien, Mount Da, Mount Khong ten, Ho Bach and Hill-215; the VC ‘Ba Gia’ Regiment held their positions on Hill-269 and Hill-310, to stop South Vietnamese counter-attacks from Tuan Duong; while the 52nd Independent Brigade captured Go Han, Phuoc Tien, Duong Ong Luu, Duong Huế, Nui My, Hon Nhon, Deo Lieu, and Mount Đất Đỏ. Thus, 23 positions held by units of the ARVN 12th Ranger Group were captured after four hours of fighting.

At 09:00 on March 10, PAVN soldiers of the 368th Artillery Regiment dragged 12 pieces of artillery which included 85mm, 105mm and 122mm guns onto the top of Nui Vu and Han Thon, and aimed their guns directly on Hill 211 and the administrative centre of Tien Phuoc, to support the 31st Regiment attacking those areas. At 13:30, following two failed counter-attacks, South Vietnamese units in Phuoc Lam deserted from the battlefield. In the meantime, however, South Vietnamese troops in Tien Phuoc held their ground with support from two A-37 bombers, after South Vietnamese commanders on the ground had called for reinforcement from Chu Lai. By 16:00, Tien Phuoc was captured by the PAVN 2nd Division.

Due to the loss of Tien Phuoc and Phouc Lam, the ARVN 916th Regional Force Battalion retreated from the area. Thus, Tam Kỳ, the capital of Quảng Tin Province, was threatened to be overrun by the PAVN.

On March 11, Trưởng ordered Nhựt to mobilise the 2nd Division, the 12th Ranger Group, elements of the 11th Armoured Squadron and one regional force battalion to mount a counter-attack from Tuan Duong to Cam Khe and Duong Con. Trưởng also ordered the ARVN 2nd Infantry Regiment, 3rd Infantry Division to depart from Da Nang, and protect Tam Kỳ, so that Nhựt's forces could be freed up to fight the PAVN.

However, between March 14 and 15, the ARVN 2nd Infantry Regiment was forced to turn back from Tam Kỳ to deal with an attack on Thang Binh, by the VC 70th and 72nd Local Force Battalions. In southern Quảng Ngãi, the VC 94th Local Force Regiment attacked Binh Son, cut off a section of Highway 1 near Chau O, and the ARVN 4th Infantry Regiment, 2nd Infantry Division was pinned down trying to deal with VC attacks. Thus, South Vietnamese attempts to stage an effective counter-attack were quickly blunted by the combined PAVN/VC forces in Quảng Ngãi Province. Recognising that he no longer had the manpower to mount a counter-attack, Nhựt ordered his troops to abandon Tra Bong and Son Ha, and concentrate his units in Tam Kỳ and Chu Lai instead.

Following the failed counter-attack, South Vietnamese forces in I Corps were further weakened when Thiệu pulled the Airborne Division back to Saigon. Now that the South Vietnamese 2nd Infantry Division and the 12th Ranger Group was overstretched between Quảng Ngãi and Hội An, with Tam Kỳ only defended by the ARVN 5th Infantry Regiment and one battalion from the ARVN 4th Infantry Regiment, PAVN General Chu Huy Mân decided to utilise the advantage to capture Tam Kỳ. Beginning at 05:30 on March 21, the PAVN 2nd Division attacked Suoi Da, the last South Vietnamese outpost outside Tam Kỳ. At around midday, Nhựt ordered the rest of the 4th Infantry Regiment out from Quảng Ngãi in an attempt to hold Tam Kỳ, so South Vietnamese defences in that province was further weakened. Again, taking advantage of the situation, Mân ordered the 52nd Independent Brigade and the 94th Local Force Regiment to attack Quảng Ngãi. By 07:00 on March 24, the cities of Tam Kỳ and Quảng Ngãi were simultaneously attacked by PAVN/VC forces. In Tam Kỳ, the ARVN 4th and 5th Infantry Regiments were destroyed after two hours of heavy fighting, while the 37th and 39th Ranger Battalions (from the ARVN 12th Ranger Group) in the outskirts of the city simply fled from the battlefield. At 10:00 on March 24, PAVN and VC soldiers of the 2nd Division, the ‘Ba Gia’ Regiment, and the 31st Regiment successfully captured Tam Kỳ.

In Quảng Ngãi, the PAVN 52nd Independent Brigade, with support from two special forces battalions as well as tanks and armoured vehicles from the 574th Regiment, rolled over South Vietnamese defences. At around 14:00, the surviving elements of the ARVN 6th Infantry Regiment, the rest of the 12th Ranger Group and the 4th Tank Squadron was ambushed by the VC 94th Local Force Regiment along Highway 1 when they tried to retreat towards Chu Lai without a fight. As a result, over 600 South Vietnamese soldiers were killed, and around 3,500 others were captured. At 23:30 on March 24, the PAVN was in full control of Quảng Ngãi City.

On March 25, 1975, the Tin-Ngai Campaign concluded with PAVN/VC forces in full control of Quảng Tin and Quảng Ngai Provinces, leaving Da Nang as the only major city in I Corps still held by the South Vietnamese.

As such, out of the 44 provinces in South Vietnam, 10 were occupied by the PAVN, and three ARVN infantry divisions were rendered ineffective. In addition, the elite ARVN 147th Marines Brigade ceased to exist as a fighting force.

=== Fall of Da Nang ===
==== South Vietnamese dispositions ====
By 1975, Da Nang had become the second largest city in South Vietnam, with close to a million inhabitants. It was a major economic and political centre in I Corps, and was home to the largest military installations which incorporated the South Vietnamese army, navy and air force. Logistically, the military infrastructure within the city could hold thousands of tons of weaponry, ammunition, food supplies and other essential war materials. It also had four large seaports, and major airports at Da Nang and Nuoc Man. So, on March 25, following the loss of Quảng Trị, Thừa Thiên, Quảng Nam and Quảng Ngãi, Thiệu ordered South Vietnamese commanders at all levels to hold what was left of I Corps until the very end. On March 26, Trưởng gathered what was left of his units, about 75,000 soldiers, and organised them into the following order:

- Outer Defensive Line: The 258th Marines Brigade and the 914th Regional Force Battalion to hold all areas between Phuoc Tuong and Lien Chieu. The 369th Marines Brigade and the 57th Infantry Regiment, 3rd Infantry Division were to protect Dai Loc and Dong Lam. The surviving elements of the 147th Marines Brigade and the Marine Division Headquarters would hold Nuoc Man airfield. Meanwhile, the remnants of the 3rd Infantry Division would hold Vinh Dien and Ninh Que, while the 15th Ranger Group held Ba Ren.
- Inner Defensive Line: The 912th Regional Force Battalion, and the last elements of the 11th and 20th Armoured Squadrons held Phuoc Tuong-Hoa My. The last three battalions of the 1st Infantry Division, the 2nd Infantry Division, the 12th Ranger Group, and about 3,000 freshly trained soldiers from the Hoa Cam Training Camp were ordered to defend all key areas between Hoa Cam and Nuoc Man. All independent Regional and Popular Force battalions were placed in reserve, and could go into combat when required.

Trưởng also had 12 artillery battalions at his disposal, as well as the 1st Air Force Division based at Da Nang and Nuoc Man, which were still intact despite the early clashes in I Corps.

==== North Vietnamese plan of attack ====
Following the conclusion of the Tri Thien and Tin-Ngai Campaigns, the PAVN High Command ordered General Lê Trọng Tấn to journey south from Hanoi and personally take charge of the Da Nang Campaign. Subsequently, on March 25, the North Vietnamese came up with a plan to attack Da Nang from four directions:

- North: The 325th Division (without the 95th Regiment), with support from one tank battalion and one artillery battalion, were ordered to advance along Highway 1 and capture the ARVN 1st Brigade Headquarters, the South Vietnamese 1st Air Force Division at Da Nang, and then move on to the Son Tra Peninsula to capture the main seaport there.
- North-West: The 9th Regiment, 304th Division, with support from one tank battalion, one artillery battalion and one anti-aircraft gun battalion, were ordered to advance along Highway 14B, and capture the ARVN 3rd Infantry Division Headquarters at Phuoc Tuong, and then move on to Da Nang Air Base.
- South & South-East: The 2nd Division, with support from one artillery unit (the 36th Artillery Regiment), one artillery battalion, one tank-armoured vehicles battalion, one anti-aircraft gun battalion, and one anti-tank weapons company, were ordered to take Da Nang Air Base and the ARVN 1st Brigade Headquarters, then capture the city itself. The 3rd and 68th Regiments were placed in reserve.
- South-West: The 2nd Corps (without the 9th Regiment, 304th Division) was ordered to take all positions held by the 369th Marine Brigade along the defensive line at Thuong Duc-Ai Nghia-Hiep Duc, then advance toward Nuoc Man airfield. The 24th Regiment, 304th Division was required to capture Hoa Cam and then move on to Da Nang.

==== The fight begins ====
Before the North Vietnamese finalised their plan to capture Da Nang, the 2nd Corps had already begun making preparations for the final attack on the city. On March 24, the PAVN 325th Division fought with the 258th Marine Brigade and the 914th Regional Force Battalion at north Hai Van, and overran Phuoc Tuong, Nuoc Ngot, Tho Son and Thua Luu. Consequently, PAVN forces captured ARVN artillery positions in Phuoc Tuong, and made good use of it during the following weeks. On March 27, with air-support from A-37 attack aircraft from Da Nang, the 258th Marine Brigade and the 914th Regional Force Battalion tried to hold off PAVN forces at Phu Gia and Hai Van, but they were pushed back and sustained heavy casualties in the process. The PAVN 325th Division then continued their advance through So Hai, Loan Ly, An Bao and Lăng Cô. Soon afterwards, more than 30 artillery pieces belonging to the PAVN 84th and 164th Artillery Regiments were placed at various high points in Son Thach, Son Khanh and Mui Trau; beginning at 5:30am on March 28, PAVN artillery units bombarded South Vietnamese positions around Da Nang. Meanwhile, the 369th Marine Brigade quickly abandoned their position at Son Ga, after they had detected elements of the PAVN 304th Division conducting reconnaissance missions on the battlefield. On March 28, the PAVN 66th Regiment, 304th Division attacked and captured the administrative area of Ai Nghia and Nuoc Man airfield, while the PAVN 24th Regiment attacked Hoa Cam and Toa in the outskirts of Da Nang.

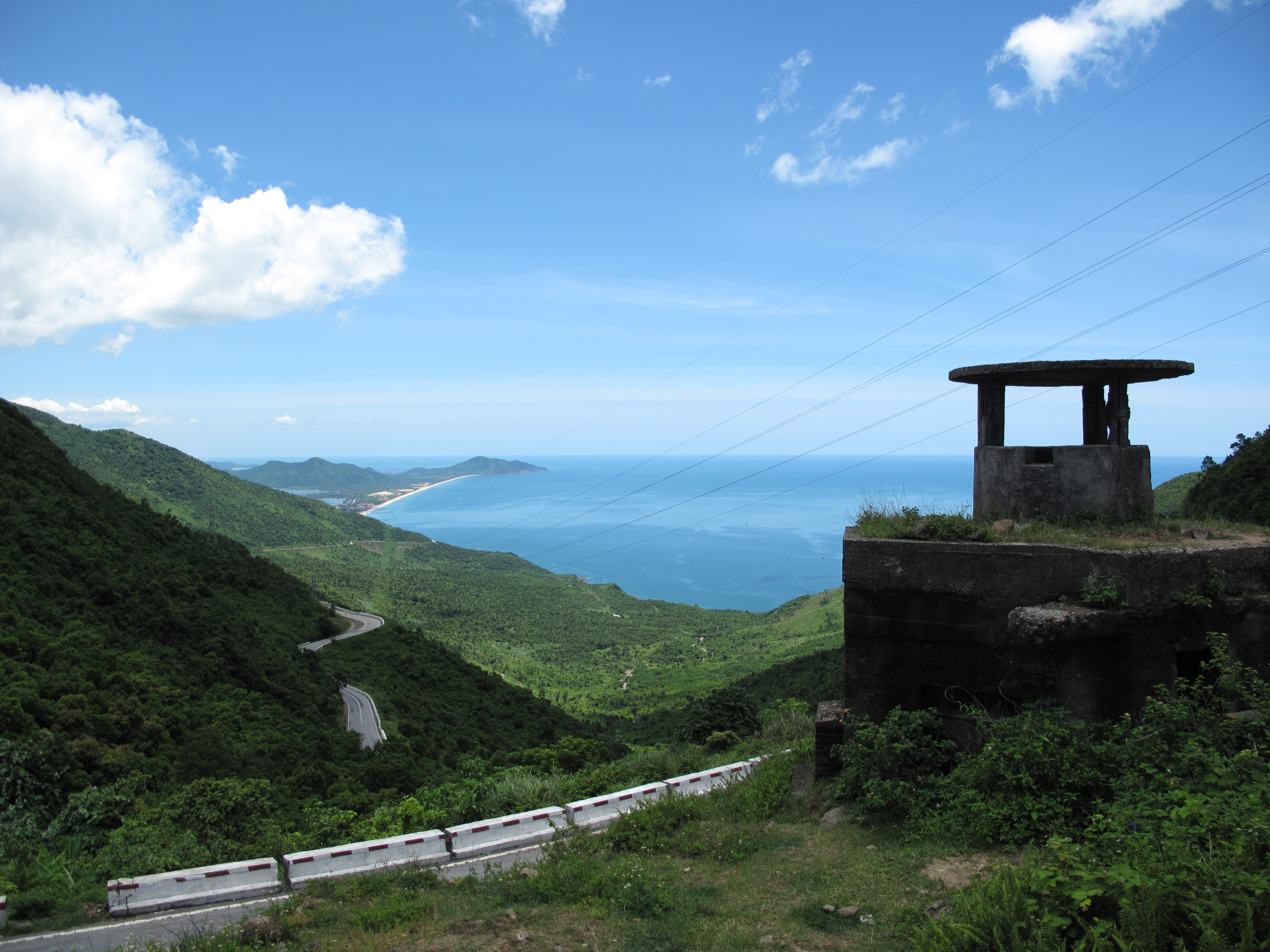
The Hải Vân Pass

The 369th Marine Brigade then tried to pull back towards An Dong and My Khe, but they were pursued by the PAVN 2nd Division. Meanwhile, the 3,000 South Vietnamese soldiers at Hoa Cam mutinied against their commanding officers, and surrendered to the PAVN. South of Da Nang, the PAVN 2nd Division, with support from tank and artillery units was able to overrun Ba Ren at around 09:00 on March 28. In response, Trưởng ordered Air Force Brigadier-General Nguyen Van Khanh to send a squadron of four A-37s to destroy the main bridges at Ba Ren and Cau Lau, but they could not prevent the PAVN 2nd Division from crossing the river using canoes, and other small river craft. At 05:55 on March 29, the outer South Vietnamese defence line located south of Da Nang succumbed to the PAVN. At 06:30 on the same day, the last South Vietnamese strongholds in and around Hai Van were overrun by the PAVN. The PAVN 325th Division then secured Lien Chieu, the Nam O Bridge and the Trinh Me The Bridge, thereby clearing the main road for the supporting tank and armored units to advance on Son Tra. As PAVN troops were closing in, Trưởng and other high-ranking South Vietnamese officers were airlifted out to the coastal areas, where they boarded the navy transport ship HQ-404. At midday, the ARVN 1st Brigade Headquarters was captured. At 12:30, the 9th Regiment, 304th Division also captured the ARVN 3rd Infantry Division Headquarters, and quickly established their control over the entire Phuoc Tuong area.

Vietnamese civilians fleeing from Da Nang in March 1975

By the time Da Nang fell into North Vietnamese hands, South Vietnamese commanders on the ground simply lost control of their men as military discipline collapsed. On March 28, about 6,000 soldiers of the 2nd Infantry Division deserted, and left the battlefield. And then the soldiers of the ARVN 3rd Infantry Division also retreated, thereby leaving the rear of the Marine Division exposed to enemy attacks. Since March 25, from the CIA Station in Da Nang, Al Francis and the U.S. Embassy in Saigon began formulating an evacuation plan, in order to evacuate U.S. citizens and South Vietnamese government officials out from Da Nang. As part of the plan, aircraft belonging to civilian airliners were to be used. And in addition to the South Vietnamese navy vessels of I Corps, U.S. General Homer D. Smith also provided five barges, six passenger liners and three cargo ships to help with the evacuation process. Even though the evacuation plan was designed to be carried out in an orderly manner, chaos and confusion quickly descended on the civilian and military population of Da Nang as people fought each other to board the vessels anchored off the coast. On the afternoon of March 29, North Vietnamese soldiers of the 2nd, 304th, 324th and 325th Divisions, as well as the 203rd Armoured Regiment, entered the city of Da Nang.

== Aftermath ==
=== Casualties ===
The struggle for Huế and Da Nang had cost South Vietnam its entire army corps. According to the Socialist Republic of Vietnam's official history, apart from the 16,000 soldiers and civilians who managed to escape, over 120,000 South Vietnamese soldiers were killed, wounded or captured after the fall of Huế and Da Nang. In abandoning I Corps, the South Vietnamese military left behind vast quantities of U.S.-supplied military hardware. The North Vietnamese claimed to have captured 129 aircraft of different models, 179 tanks and armored vehicles, 327 artillery pieces, 184 transport vehicles and 47 naval craft. More than 10,000 tons of bombs, ammunition, grenades, food supplies, combat rations, and other materials were also captured. Total PAVN/VC casualties are unknown.

=== Loss of northern provinces of South Vietnam ===
Thiệu's decision to abandon the Central Highlands and the coastal regions of I Corps had a severe negative impact on ARVN morale, especially as the northern provinces of South Vietnam were driven into chaos. On March 31, after the fall of Huế and Da Nang, ARVN General Phạm Văn Phú, commander of II Corps Tactical Zone, held a meeting with his General Staff and the provincial chiefs of Bình Định, Khánh Hòa, Phú Yên, Ninh Thuận and Bình Thuận and requested them to form a defensive line from Qui Nhơn into the Mekong Delta to cover the retreat of the ARVN from the Central Highlands. Subsequently, Phu issued the following orders: Rear Admiral Hoang Co Minh was to oversee military operations in the Qui Nhơn region, Brigadier-General Trần Văn Cẩm to hold Phú Yên, Brigadier-General Nguyen Ngoc Oanh and Brigadier-General Nguyen Van Luong was tasked with holding Nha Trang. Meanwhile, General Phan Dinh Niem, the commander of the ARVN 22nd Infantry Division, was required to form a defensive line linking Qui Nhơn with Diêu Trì and Deo Ca, with the purpose of delaying the PAVN.

The withdrawal plan formulated by Phú and his General Staff was made with the belief that the PAVN would stop and consolidate their territorial gains before they could go on the attack again. However, North Vietnamese commanders were more than willing to maneuver their units away from newly captured territories, in order to pursue retreating South Vietnamese units.

Furthermore, South Vietnamese commanders never realized that Hanoi had given its field commanders the full flexibility to respond to the changing circumstances on the battlefield and had supplied the PAVN with weaponry that was required to achieve their objectives. Ultimately, the average South Vietnamese soldiers would have to pay for the miscalculation of their commanders.

At 05:15 on March 31, the 47th Infantry Regiment, 22nd Infantry Division was ambushed by the 2nd Regiment, 3rd Division while it was withdrawing towards Phu An-Lai Nghi. Upon their arrival at Phu Cat, the remnants of the ARVN 47th Infantry Regiment was encircled and assaulted by the PAVN 198th Regiment, and ceased to exist as a fighting unit by 12:30.

The 41st Infantry Regiment, 22nd Infantry Division also came under attack from the PAVN 95th Regiment as it moved from Nui Mot to Phu Phong. Throughout the evening of March 31, the 41st Infantry Regiment fought with the PAVN 141st Regiment, as soon as they reached Phat Giao. In contrast to the other units, the 42nd Infantry Regiment, 22nd Infantry Division was able to escape the PAVN onslaught, but their strength was significantly reduced before they reached Dieu Tri. On April 1, Quy Nhon fell to the PAVN, which was followed by Tuy Hòa on April 2. ARVN General Trần was captured in Tuy Hòa after his helicopter had landed on the ground, where he tried to survey the battlefield. The destruction of the ARVN 22nd Infantry Division, which had about 10,000 fully equipped men, caused chaos in Nha Trang; more than 3,000 South Vietnamese recruits from the Lam Son Army Training Centre retreated into the city, and another 1,000 soldiers went on a rampage and looted goods on the main streets. The chief of Khánh Hòa Province, Colonel Ly Ba Pham, boarded a military aircraft and flew out to Phan Rang Air Base after he had notified Saigon that "the situation is irreversible". On the afternoon of April 2, Nha Trang was overrun by the PAVN, and not a single battle was fought in its defence. By 2:00 pm on April 2, Phú had lost every military unit and territory under his control.

=== Decisions of President Nguyễn Văn Thiệu ===
According to many academics, both in Vietnam and in the West, the major factor which contributed to the rapid collapse of South Vietnamese defences in 1975 was the numerous and contradictory orders issued by Thiệu. During the various phases of the South Vietnamese retreat from the northern provinces, namely in I and II Corps Tactical Zones, Thiệu had at least three different plans and decisions laid out before him, and all lacked consistency or simply contradicted one another. For example, on March 13, Thiệu ordered Trưởng to abandon I Corps, and return the elite Airborne Division to the Mekong Delta region of III Corps. Soon afterwards, similar orders were issued to Phú to evacuate from the Central Highlands. On March 17, with intervention from General Cao Văn Viên, Thiệu contradicted his previous orders when he approved Trưởng's defensive plan to hold the major cities of Huế and Da Nang.

However, the very next day, Thiệu ordered Trưởng and General Thi to abandon Huế and to concentrate only sufficient numbers of South Vietnamese units to hold Da Nang. On March 29, as Trưởng was about to board HQ-404, he received a call from Thiệu, who ordered him to turn back and retake Da Nang from the North Vietnamese forces. By then, however, South Vietnamese units in I Corps had virtually disappeared, and their commanding officers had fled from their posts.

Trưởng refused to carry out Thiệu's orders. Between April 3 and 4, Thiệu reprimanded Phú and Thi for the debacles in II and I Corps respectively, and Generals Phạm Quốc Thuần and Dư Quốc Đống for the fall of Phước Long in 1974.

Even though Thiệu used the defeat of the South Vietnamese forces as a justification for the arrest of those generals, his real intention behind the arrests was to avert an imaginary military coup against him. For that reason, he chose to pull the Airborne Division back to III Corps, which was commanded by loyalist officers, instead of the Marine Corps Division. Trưởng and General Lê Nguyên Khang were spared, but both men responded strongly to Thiệu's reaction. Trưởng considered the aforementioned generals to be victims of an injustice, as they were far more competent than Thiệu's loyalists in Saigon.

In addition to the military disasters suffered on the battlefield, Thiệu also caused instability within his own government during the final days of South Vietnam's existence. For example, on April 2, Thiệu requested the country's National Assembly to dissolve Prime Minister Trần Thiện Khiêm's cabinet and to replace him with Nguyễn Bá Cẩn. The National Assembly quickly approved Thiệu's request. The same day, Thiệu ordered the arrest of seven individuals who had worked for Air Marshal Nguyễn Cao Kỳ for fear they were plotting to overthrow him.

William Colby, the CIA Chief of Station in Saigon, wrote in a report that the balance of power had leaned in Hanoi's favour. Thus, if South Vietnam were to survive the North Vietnamese onslaught, Thiệu's replacement would have to accept a resolution to the conflict on North Vietnamese terms.

== Sources ==
- Alan Dawson. (1990). The Collapse of Saigon in 55 Days. Hanoi: Su That Publishing.
- Duong Hao. (1980). A Tragic Chapter. Hanoi: People's Army Publishing House.
- Gabriel Kolko. (2003). Anatomy of a War (Translated by Nguyen Tan Cuu). Hanoi: People's Army Publishing House.
- Le Dai Anh Kiet. (2003). The Narratives of Saigon Generals. Hanoi: People's Police Publishing.
- Le Minh Tan. (1989). History of the 2nd Division. Hanoi: People's Army Publishing House.
- Paul Dreyfrus. (2004). The Collapse of Saigon (Translated by Le Kim). Hanoi: People's Police Publishing.
- Pham Ngoc Thach & Ho Khang. (2008). History of the War of Resistance against America (8th edn). Hanoi: National Politics Publishing House.
- Frank Snepp. (2001). A Disastrous Retreat (Translated by Ngo Du). Ho Chi Minh City: Ho Chi Minh City Publishing.
- Tran Quynh Cu, Nguyen Huu Dao & Do Thi Tuyet Quang. (2003). Events in the History of Vietnam (1945–1975). Hanoi: Educational Publishing.
- Trinh Vuong Hong & Pham Huu Thang. (2006). History of the Tri-Thien Campaign and Da Nang Campaign during Spring 1975. Hanoi: People's Army Publishing House.
