= Nguyễn Duy Hinh =

South Vietnamese major general

- Born: 1929 (age 96–97)
- Military career
- Allegiance: South Vietnam
- Branch: Vietnamese National Army; Army of the Republic of Vietnam
- Rank: Major general
- Commands: 3rd Infantry Division
- Conflicts: Vietnam War: Battle of Đức Dục; Battle of Thượng Đức; Fall of Saigon

Nguyễn Duy Hinh was a Major general in the Army of the Republic of Vietnam (ARVN). He was the second and also last commander of the ARVN 3rd Infantry Division.

== Military career ==
In 1967, Colonel Hinh was the commander of the ARVN Quảng – Đà Special Zone, controlled the 51st Infantry Regiment and the 59th Regional Force (RF) Battalion fighting against the People's Army of Vietnam (PAVN) Group 44 of Senior Colonel Võ Thứ, the former commander of the PAVN 3rd Infantry Division.

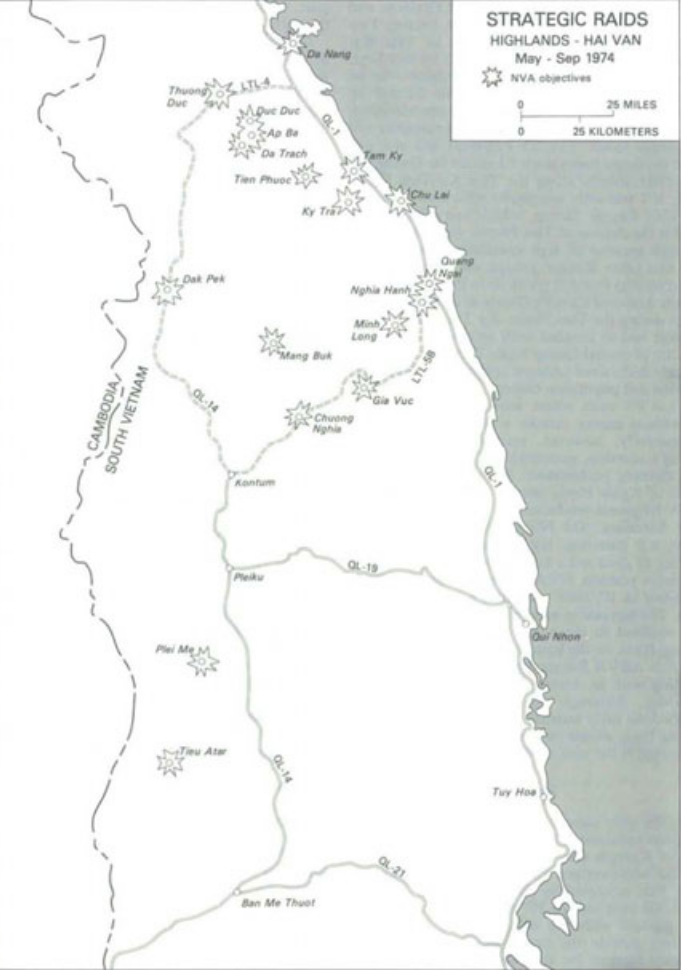
Strategic raids from the Highlands to the Hải Vân Pass in 1974

After the failure of the 3rd Division in the First Battle of Quảng Trị 1972, Brigadier General Nguyễn Duy Hinh was appointed the division's new commander. The 3rd division recovered rapidly under Brig. Gen. Hinh and cooperated successfully with the 2nd Infantry Division of Brig. Gen. Trần Văn Nhựt in Quảng Tín – Quảng Ngãi regions, retaking the district town of Tiên Phước a few months later.

From mid July to mid November of 1974, Maj. Gen. Hinh led his 3rd Division along with I Corps Rangers and the JGS Airborne under Lt. Gen. Ngô Quang Trưởng concurrently fighting against the PAVN three-division combined force in the Battle of Đức Dục and the Battle of Thượng Đức. Both sides sufferred thousands killed and wounded but the ARVN losses were irreplaceable.

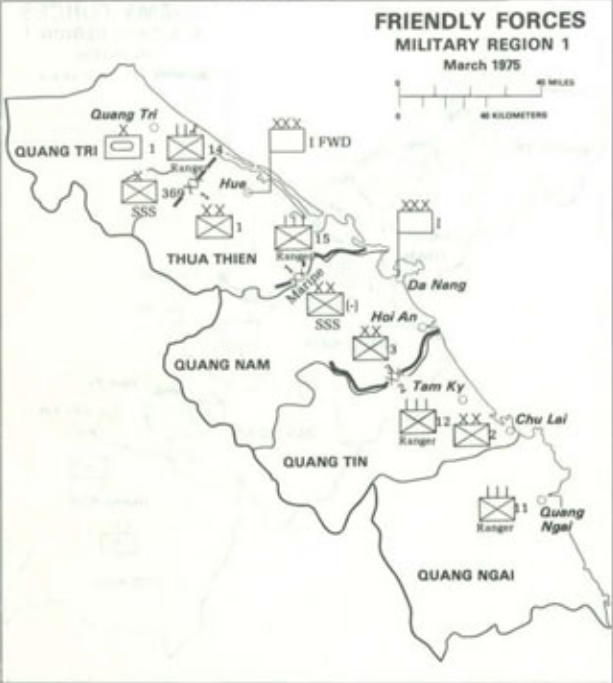
Deployment of South Vietnamese units in I Corps in March 1975

On 24 April 1975, Maj. Gen. Hinh was tasked to defend the Bà Rịa / Vũng Tàu region and Route 15 with his two-battalion 3rd Division, the 14th Marine Battalion, the half-strength 1st Airborne Brigade, the 2nd Squadron of the 15th Cavalry Regiment, and Phước Tuy Regional Forces (the 938th Group).

== Later life ==
After migrating to the US, together with some ARVN ex-commanders like Gen. Cao Văn Viên and Lt. Gen. Ngô Quang Trưởng, Maj. Gen. Hinh wrote several books for The Indochina Monographs series of the United States Army Center of Military History (CMH), such as:

- Lam Son 719 (CMH 1979, about Operation Lam Son 719)
- Vietnamization and the Cease-fire (CMH 1980, about Vietnamization policy since 1969, then the Paris Peace Accords 1973)
- The South Vietnamese Society (CMH 1980, with Brig. Gen. Trần Đình Thọ)
