= 3rd Division (South Vietnam) =

3rd Infantry Division
- Sư đoàn 3 Bộ binh
- 3rd Division SSI
- Active: November 1971 – 1975
- Country: South Vietnam
- Branch: Army of the Republic of Vietnam
- Role: Infantry
- Part of: I Corps
- Garrison/HQ: Quảng Trị; Da Nang
- Nickname: Ben Hai
- Engagements: Vietnam War: Easter Offensive; First Battle of Quang Tri; War of the flags; Battle of Thượng Đức; Battle of Duc Duc; Hue–Da Nang Campaign; Fall of Saigon

Commanders
- Notable commanders: Vũ Văn Giai; Nguyễn Duy Hinh

Insignia
- Division flag

The 3rd Infantry Division of the Army of the Republic of Vietnam (ARVN)—the army of the nation state of South Vietnam that existed from 1955 to 1975—was part of the I Corps that oversaw the northernmost region of South Vietnam, the centre of Vietnam.

The Division was initially raised in November 1971 in Quảng Trị and composed of 2nd Infantry Regiment (from the 1st Infantry Division), 56th Infantry Regiment and 57th Infantry Regiment, the first commander was Brigadier General Vũ Văn Giai the former deputy commander of the 1st Infantry Division.

The overburdened division collapsed in 1972 during the Easter Offensive, was reconstituted and finally destroyed at Da Nang in 1975 during the Hue-Da Nang Campaign.

== History ==
At the end of 1969, Major general Melvin Zais, commanding US XXIV Corps in I Corps, proposed breaking up the 1st Division (with four regiments and about nineteen combat battalions) into two divisions controlled by a "light corps" headquarters responsible for the defense of the Vietnamese Demilitarized Zone (DMZ) area, but his immediate superior, Lieutenant general Herman Nickerson Jr. (USMC), commanding the III Marine Amphibious Force (and the I Corps senior adviser) and General Hoàng Xuân Lãm, the I Corps commander, both vetoed the idea, citing the lack of enough experienced Vietnamese officers to staff a new command.

In July 1971, rather than move one of the Mekong Delta based ARVN divisions north, as recommended by General Robert E. Cushman Jr., the IV Corps senior adviser, COMUSMACV General Creighton Abrams went along with Joint General Staff chief General Cao Văn Viên's decision to create the new 3rd Infantry Division from existing regular and territorial elements in I Corps.

ARVN General Ngô Quang Trưởng asserted that although the Division had never fought a coordinated battle as a division, its battalions were seasoned combat teams with long experience fighting in northern Quảng Trị Province. Most of the Division's soldiers were natives of the region familiar with its terrain and weather. The battalions of the 56th and 57th Regiments were veterans of the DMZ. They occupied base camps and strongpoints they had been in for years and their dependents lived in nearby hamlets. Five out of its nine infantry battalions and its armored cavalry squadron were all units with long combat records, having fought People's Army of Vietnam (PAVN) forces in the DMZ area for several years. Its other four infantry battalions were transferred as complete units, not piecemeal, from ARVN and territorial forces of I Corps. In contrast to this assessment, other authors assert that the 56th and 57th Regiments were made up of recaptured deserters, released criminals, poorly trained transferees from the Regional and Popular Forces and fresh draftees, led by officers and NCOs rejected by other units.

The Division was generally responsible for Quảng Trị Province, despite its proximity to the DMZ, it was believed that the PAVN would not make a direct attack across the DMZ and so it was regarded as a safe area for the Division to form and train in. Its headquarters under the command of Brigadier General Vũ Văn Giai, former deputy commander of the 1st Division, was located at Ái Tử Combat Base. The newly activated 56th and 57th Regiments were deployed over a series of strongpoints and fire support bases dotting the area immediately south of the DMZ and from the coast to the mountains in the west. The 56th Regiment was headquartered at Camp Carroll while the 57th Regiment was located at Firebase C1. The 2nd Regiment occupied Camp Carroll with two of its battalions at Firebase C2. Camp Carroll was the lynchpin of the ARVN northern and western defense line situated on Route 9, the main road west to the Laos border. The Division's 11th Armored Cavalry Squadron was located at Landing Zone Sharon south of Quảng Trị.

In addition to its organic units the Division had operational control of two Marine brigades of the general reserve. The 147th Marine Brigade was headquartered at Mai Loc Camp 2 km east of Camp Carroll and the 258th Brigade was at Firebase Nancy. The Marines and 56th Regiment presented a strong west-facing defense as this was assumed to be the most likely direction of attack.

On 30 March, the Division was in the middle of rotating its units between the various defensive positions. The 56th Regiment was taking over Camp Carroll, Firebase Khe Gio and Firebase Fuller from the 2nd Regiment. The 57th Regiment was taking over the area from Đông Hà Combat Base north to the DMZ and east to the coast. The 2nd Regiment was taking over the combat bases north of Cam Lộ Combat Base. The two Regiments were intermingled on Route 9 and out of radio contact with Division headquarters when the PAVN began their offensive.

=== Easter Offensive ===
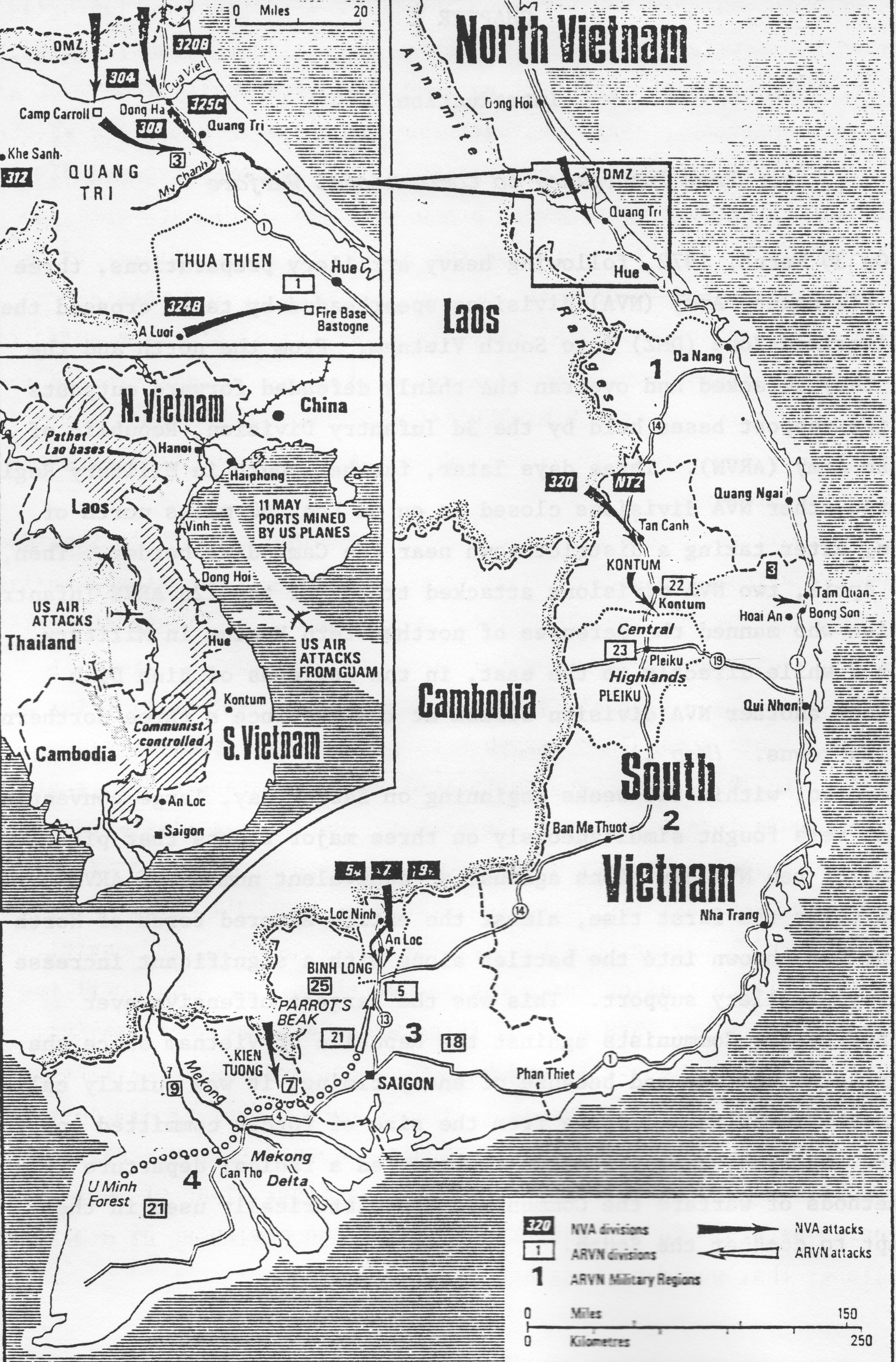
Map of the Easter Offensive

The offensive began at noon on 30 March 1972, when an intense artillery barrage rained down on the northernmost ARVN outposts as the 56th and 57th Regiments were still in the process of occupying Camp Carroll and Strongpoint C-1. Two PAVN divisions (the 304th and 308th – approximately 30,000 troops) supported by more than 100 tanks (in two Regiments) then rolled over the DMZ to attack I Corps. The 308th Division and two independent regiments assaulted the "ring of steel", the arc of ARVN firebases just south of the DMZ. From the west, the 312th, including an armored regiment, moved out of Laos along Route 9, past Khe Sanh, and into the Quảng Trị River valley towards Camp Carroll.

On 30 March 1972, the 258th Marine Brigade was deployed forward to Đông Hà. Early on the morning of 1 April under pressure from the PAVN the 4th Vietnamese Marine Corps Battalion abandoned Firebase Sarge and retreated to Mai Loc Camp. The 56th Regiment withdrew to Camp Carroll, the 57th Regiment to north of Dong Ha and the 2nd Regiment withdrew to Cam Lộ. By 1 April the PAVN had broken through the ARVN defensive positions along the DMZ and north of the Cam Lo River and fragmented ARVN units and terrified civilians began withdrawing to Đông Hà. Giai, ordered a withdrawal of the Division south of the Cửa Việt River in order for his troops to reorganize a new defensive line: Regional and Popular Forces would secure the area from the coast to 5 km inland; the 57th Regiment would hold the area from there to Đông Hà; the 1st Armored Brigade including the 20th Tank Battalion would hold Đông Hà; the 2nd Regiment reinforced by an armored cavalry squadron would hold Cam Lộ, while the 56th Regiment supported by the 11th Armored Cavalry Squadron would hold Camp Carroll. Extending the line south the 147th Marine Brigade would hold Mai Loc and secure the high ground along Route 9 between Cam Lộ and Mai Loc.

By 11:00 on 2 April, the ARVN 20th Tank Battalion moved forward to Đông Hà to support the 258th Marine Brigade in and around the town and defend the crucial road and rail bridges across the Cua Viet River. Marine ANGLICO units called in naval gunfire to hit PAVN forces near the bridges on the north bank of the river and destroyed four PT-76 amphibious tanks east of Đông Hà. More tanks were hit by a Republic of Vietnam Air Force (VNAF) A-1 Skyraider before it was shot down. At midday PAVN tanks attempted to force the road bridge, but six tanks were destroyed by fire from the ARVN 20th Tank's M48s. At approximately 13:00 Captain John Ripley an adviser to the Vietnamese Marines swung under the road bridge and spent three hours installing demolition charges to destroy the bridge. The bridge was blown up at 16:30 and the damaged railway bridge was destroyed around the same time temporarily halting the PAVN advance. Naval gunfire and a B-52 strike were soon directed at PAVN forces gathered on the northern bank.

On 2 April, after several days of shelling and surrounded by the PAVN 24th Regiment, Colonel Pham Van Dinh, commander of the 56th Regiment, surrendered Camp Caroll and his 1,500 troops. The PAVN troops were coming through the camp gate as the helicopter landed at Carroll to get the US advisors, their ARVN radio operators and another 30 ARVN soldiers who had kept their weapons and "were willing to fight on". Battery B, 1st VNMC Artillery Battalion, continued to resist until overrun at dusk. With the loss of Camp Carroll, the 147th Marine Brigade abandoned Mai Loc, the last western base and fell back to Quang Tri and then to Huế, the brigade was replaced by the fresh 369th Marine Brigade which established a new defensive line at Firebase Nancy. The capture of Camp Carroll and Mai Loc allowed PAVN forces to cross the Cam Lộ bridge, 11 km to the west of Đông Hà. The PAVN then had almost unrestricted access to western Quảng Trị Province north of the Thạch Hãn River.

Over the next two weeks, PAVN forces kept up a barrage of artillery, mortar and small arms fire on the ARVN positions and infiltrated small units across the river in boats. On 7 April, the Marines withdrew from Đông Hà leaving the defense to the ARVN 1st Armored Brigade, the 4th and 5th Ranger Groups and the understrength 57th Regiment. (Note: Beside the 20th Tank Squadron, the ARVN 1st Armored Brigade had another organic squadron: the 17th Cavalry. The Đông Hà defenders were under the 1st Armored Brigade commander - Colonel Nguyễn Trọng Luật.)

At dawn on 9 April, the PAVN launched an attack, led by tanks, against Firebase Pedro southwest of Quảng Trị. The PAVN tanks had outrun their infantry support and nine tanks were lost in a minefield around Pedro. An armored task force of eight M48s and 12 M113s from the ARVN 20th Tank Battalion were despatched from Ái Tử to support the Marines at Pedro. At the same time a flight of VNAF A-1 Skyraiders arrived overhead and destroyed five tanks. When the ARVN armor arrived they destroyed five T-54s for no losses and drove one captured T-54 back to Ái Tử. On 10 and 11 April, further PAVN attacks on Pedro were repulsed at a cost of over 200 PAVN estimated killed.

On 18 April, the PAVN 308th Division attacking from the southwest attempted to outflank Đông Hà but were repulsed by a tenacious defense and intense US airstrikes. On 23 April, the 147th Marine Brigade returned to Ái Tử and the 258th Marine Brigade redeployed to Huế leaving its 1st Battalion at Firebase Pedro under the control of the 147th Brigade.

On 28 April, the commander of the 20th Tank Battalion withdrew from Đông Hà to deal with a PAVN force threatening Ái Tử, seeing the tanks leaving the soldiers of the 57th Regiment panicked and abandoned their positions leading to the collapse of the ARVN defensive line. The VNMC 7th Battalion was sent to Ái Tử to help defend the base. At 02:00 on 29 April, the PAVN attacked the ARVN positions north and south of the base and the ARVN defenses began to crumble, by midday on 30 April Giai ordered a withdrawal from Ái Tử to a defensive line along the south of the Thạch Hãn River and the withdrawal was completed late that day. On 1 May, with his forces disintegrating Giai decided that any further defense of Quảng Trị city was pointless and that the ARVN should withdraw to a defensive line along the Mỹ Chánh River 13 km to the south, he made this decision with the tacit approval of I Corps commander Lãm. The 147th Marine Brigade which was the only unit maintaining any cohesiveness departed the city in an armored convoy, while the 3rd Division command group was evacuated by US helicopters after attempting to leave the city by road. By 2 May, all of Quảng Trị Province had fallen to the PAVN and they were threatening Huế. By the late evening of 2 May, Giai was attempting to reorganize the remnants of the 3rd Division at Camp Evans.

On 2 May, I Corps commander Lãm was summoned to Saigon for a meeting with President Nguyễn Văn Thiệu. He was relieved of command of I Corps and replaced by Lieutenant Trưởng, commander of IV Corps and former commander of the 1st Division. Trưởng's mission was to defend Huế, minimize further losses, and retake captured territory. Giai, who was to be made the scapegoat for the collapse, was placed under arrest on 5 May and tried for "desertion in the face of the enemy", and sentenced to five years in prison.

The 3rd Division at this time consisted of only its headquarters and the remnants of the 2nd and 57th Regiments. The Marine Brigades had returned to the operational control of the Marine Division which was now fully deployed in the defense of Huế. Trưởng resisted calls for the Division to be reconstituted as the 27th Division as the 3rd Division was perceived to be bad luck and the division now commanded by Brigadier General Nguyễn Duy Hinh was reconstituted at Phu Bai Combat Base and the 56th Regiment reformed and then on 16 June the Division was sent south to the Hoa Cam Training Center in Da Nang for further retraining.

In September, the Division was given the mission of engaging the PAVN 711th Division in the Quế Sơn Valley and recapturing Tiên Phước in Quảng Tín Province which it successfully achieved.

Trưởng writing in 1980 rejected much of the criticism of the Division's performance during the Easter Offensive and in particular that it consisted mostly of deserters, pardoned military criminals and other undesirable elements cast off by other units. Trưởng asserted that the Division was overburdened, being asked to defend a large area against a massive PAVN assault and that no other single ARVN division could have performed better. Trưởng credited the Division for holding the line at Đông Hà for almost a month against overwhelming PAVN forces, gaining enough time to permit the deployment of general reserve forces to decisive battle areas. Trưởng largely blamed the Corps' commander Lãm and his staff for failing to provide adequate guidance and support to the Division.

=== 1973-4 ===
During the War of the flags that preceded the signing of the Paris Peace Accords on 27 December 1972, the Division launched a spoiling attack against the PAVN 711th Division's base in Hiệp Đức District. Deep penetrations were made in the first few days and the I Corps Commander, Lt. Gen. Trưởng, sought to exploit the early success by detaching the 51st Infantry Regiment from the 1st Division and on 3 January sent it to reinforce the Division. On 16 January the Division commander Major General Hinh, committed the 51st Regiment to continue the attack to seize the former Firebase West on Hill 1460 (15.585°N 108.193°E) guarding the eastern approach to Hiệp Đức District. The 51st was able to advance only part way up Hill 1460 and could not dislodge the PAVN infantry holding the crest. Meanwhile, elements of the 2nd Regiment were across the Quế Sơn Valley and had seized the hill above Chau Son, thus controlling Route 534 into Hiệp Đức. On 24 January, the Division's attack continued, the objective was the former Firebase O'Connor (15.578°N 108.141°E) on high ground just east of Hiệp Đức. On 26 January, with the ceasefire imminent and VC forces moving into the populated lowlands of Quảng Nam, the Division had to terminate its attack. A strong counterattack by the 711th Division forces still on Firebase West prevented the Division's infantry from gaining Firebase O'Connor, but the heavy casualties sustained by the 711th demoralized and weakened it severely. By the end of January, 3rd Division troops were busy clearing VC forces from the hamlets west and southwest of Da Nang, and by the end of the month only one hamlet remained under PAVN/VC influence in Đại Lộc District.

From 2–15 July 1974, Trưởng launched Operation Quang Trung 3/74, sending the 2nd Regiment, a troop of the 11th Armored Cavalry, a battalion of 105 mm howitzers and a battery each of 155 mm howitzers and 175 mm guns into Tiên Phước District to eliminate elements of the PAVN 2nd Division and local VC main force units still threatening the district. The PAVN were forced to withdraw from Tiên Phước with losses of 315 killed and 150 weapons were captured. Its mission completed, the 2nd Regiment began moving back to Quang Nam on 16 July, but left its 3rd Battalion to assist the RF/PF of Quang Tin Province with local security.

From 29 July to 7 August 1974, the 2nd and 57th Regiments fought the Battle of Thượng Đức together with the 11th Armored Cavalry Squadron, until relieved by the 1st and 3rd Airborne Brigades.

From 18 July to 4 October 1974, the Division, together with attached Ranger units, fought the Battle of Duc Duc. More than 4,700 men were killed, wounded, or were missing in the actions in and around Duc Duc in the three-month offensive. A disproportionate number were officers and noncommissioned officers for whom no experienced replacements were available.

The PAVN's strategic raids campaign in the vast region south of the Hải Vân Pass had accomplished three things that placed PAVN forces in an excellent position to begin a major offensive. First, although PAVN casualties were very high, the campaign had severely depleted the ARVN of experienced leaders and soldiers. Replacements were not well-trained or in sufficient numbers to bring battered battalions up to strength. On the other hand, the PAVN replacements now were copious and free from interference. Second, PAVN command, staff, logistics, and communications had been thoroughly expanded and proven during this campaign; the new 3rd Corps had the valuable experience of a major offensive behind it. Third, the PAVN had pushed its holdings to the edge of the narrow coastal plain and was within artillery range of nearly every major South Vietnamese installation and population center. Similar progress, meanwhile, was being made north of the Hải Vân Pass.

=== 1975 ===
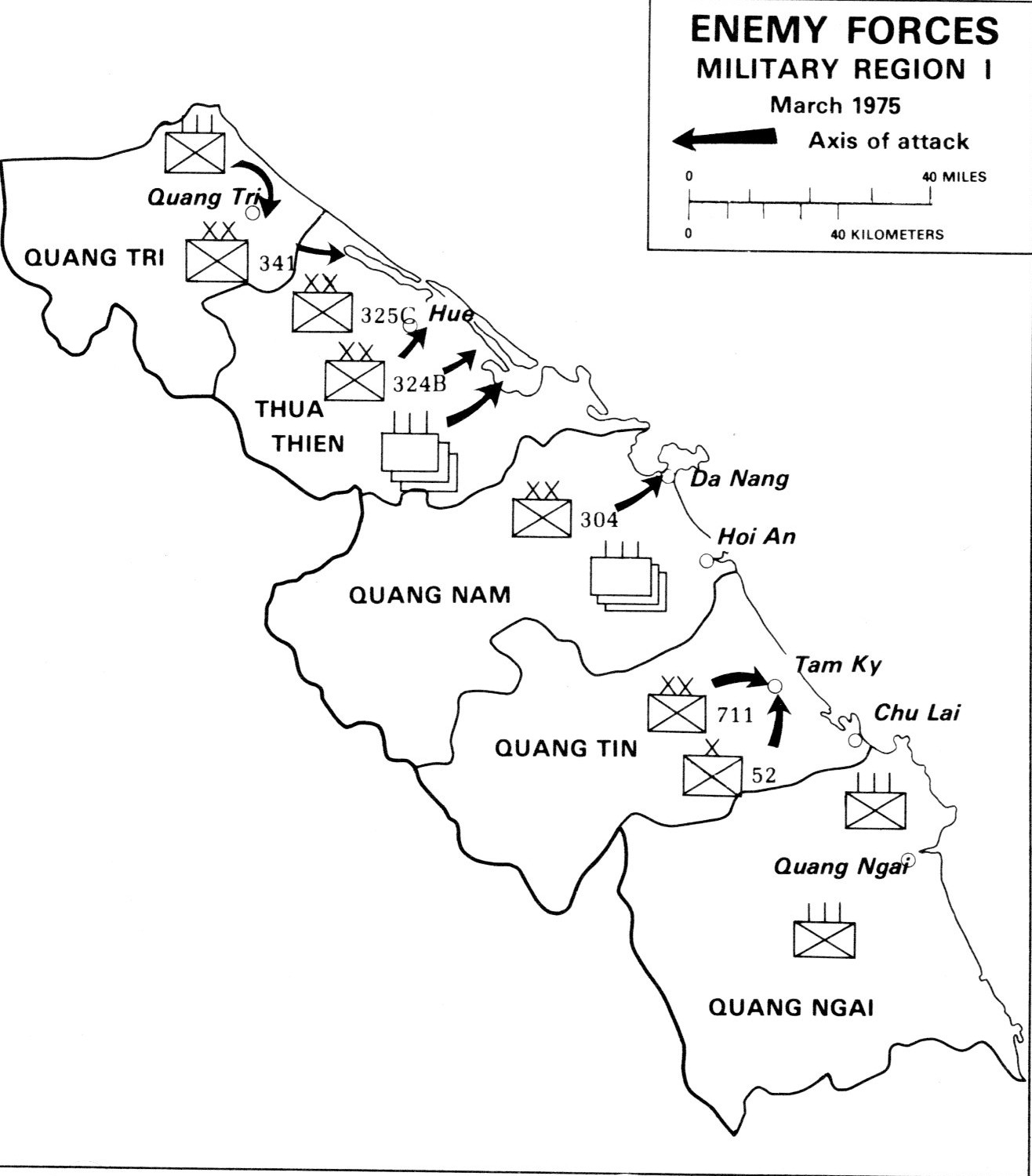
Movement of North Vietnamese units in I Corps in March 1975

In late January, the Division conducted a successful six-day foray into contested ground in Duy Xuyên and Quế Sơn Districts of Quảng Nam, again causing high casualties. In the week after Tet PAVN attacks increased markedly in Đức Dục and Đại Lộc Districts of Quảng Nam, and the ARVN responded with heavy artillery concentrations and air strikes. All indicators in forward areas pointed to a major offensive as the PAVN 304th and 2nd Divisions, opposing the Division and the 3rd Airborne Brigade, conducted reconnaissance and moved ammunition and artillery forward.

From 8 March, artillery-supported infantry assaults were launched against the Division, 3rd Airborne Brigade and Regional and Popular Force positions from Đại Lộc to Quế Sơn. Nearly all PAVN assaults were repelled with heavy PAVN losses, but sappers were able to get through and blow the main bridge on Route 540 north of Đại Lộc.

On 14 March, Trưởng met with General Thi, commanding I Corps troops in Quảng Trị and Thừa Thiên Provinces, and General Lân, the Marine Division commander, to explain his concept for the final defense of Đà Nẵng. He would pull all combat forces into Quảng Nam and defend Đà Nẵng with the 1st, 3rd and Marine Divisions on line and the 2nd Division in reserve, but this deployment would be approached gradually as divisional troops were relieved in Quảng Trị and Thừa Thiên Provinces and terrain in the southern part of the region was abandoned.

On 16 March, the PAVN pounded Thăng Bình District Town with artillery and overran outposts southwest of the village, but by 20 March, two battalions of the Division, sent from Quảng Nam Province, joined two RF battalions in a counterattack causing high PAVN casualties in tough fighting east of Thăng Bình.

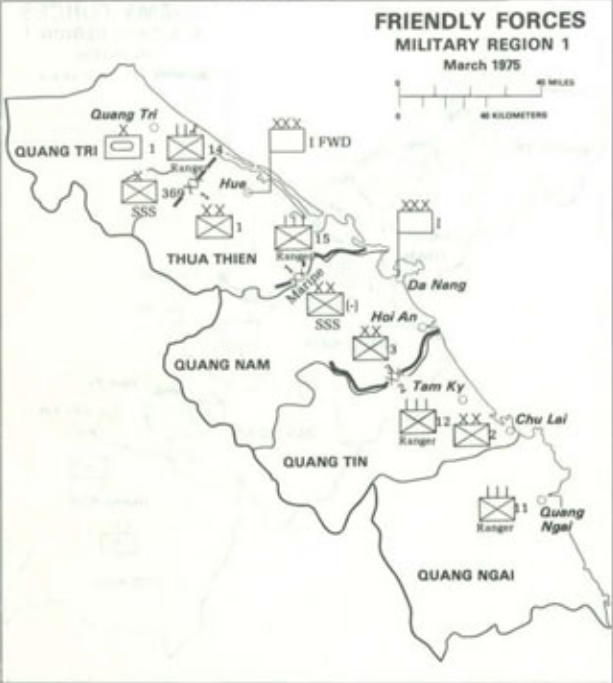
Deployment of South Vietnamese units in I Corps in March 1975

By nightfall on 23 March, the official count of refugees in Đà Nẵng, based upon police registrations, was 121,000, but the unofficial estimate by the U.S. Consul General was 400,000. All the necessities of life were missing or rapidly disappearing: food, sanitation, housing, and medical care. On 24 March, the government began moving refugees south on every available boat and ship. Thousands made it, but many more did not. PAVN attacks in Quảng Nam Province were largely blunted by the Division and Regional and Popular Forces; security, although relative, was better in Đà Nẵng than anywhere else in I Corps.

The situation in Đà Nẵng on 26 March was approaching chaos, but the Division still held in Đại Lộc and Đức Dục Districts against mounting pressure. Early that morning, 14 PAVN heavy rockets struck a refugee camp on the edge of Da Nang Air Base killing and wounding many civilians, mostly women and children. Morale in the Division was plummeting, and distraught soldiers deserted to save their families in Đà Nẵng. Population control was almost totally absent in the city; more than 2,000,000 people were in the streets trying to gather their families and escape.

On the afternoon of the 27 March, VNAF pilots destroyed four PAVN tanks attacking near Firebase Baldy. Although the PAVN broke off the attack, and the Division's battalions held their positions, it was apparent that the Division would not be able to contain PAVN attacks in the outlying districts of Quảng Nam. Trưởng therefore ordered a withdrawal to a shorter line within artillery range of the center of Đà Nẵng. Attempts to hold that line failed as large numbers of 3rd Division soldiers deserted to save their families. With defeat imminent, Trưởng shipped all organized forces, mostly marines, out of Đà Nẵng toward Saigon. Then he and most of his staff left; some of them, Trưởng included, had to swim through the surf to the rescuing fleet of boats. Đà Nẵng had fallen to the PAVN by nightfall on 30 March.

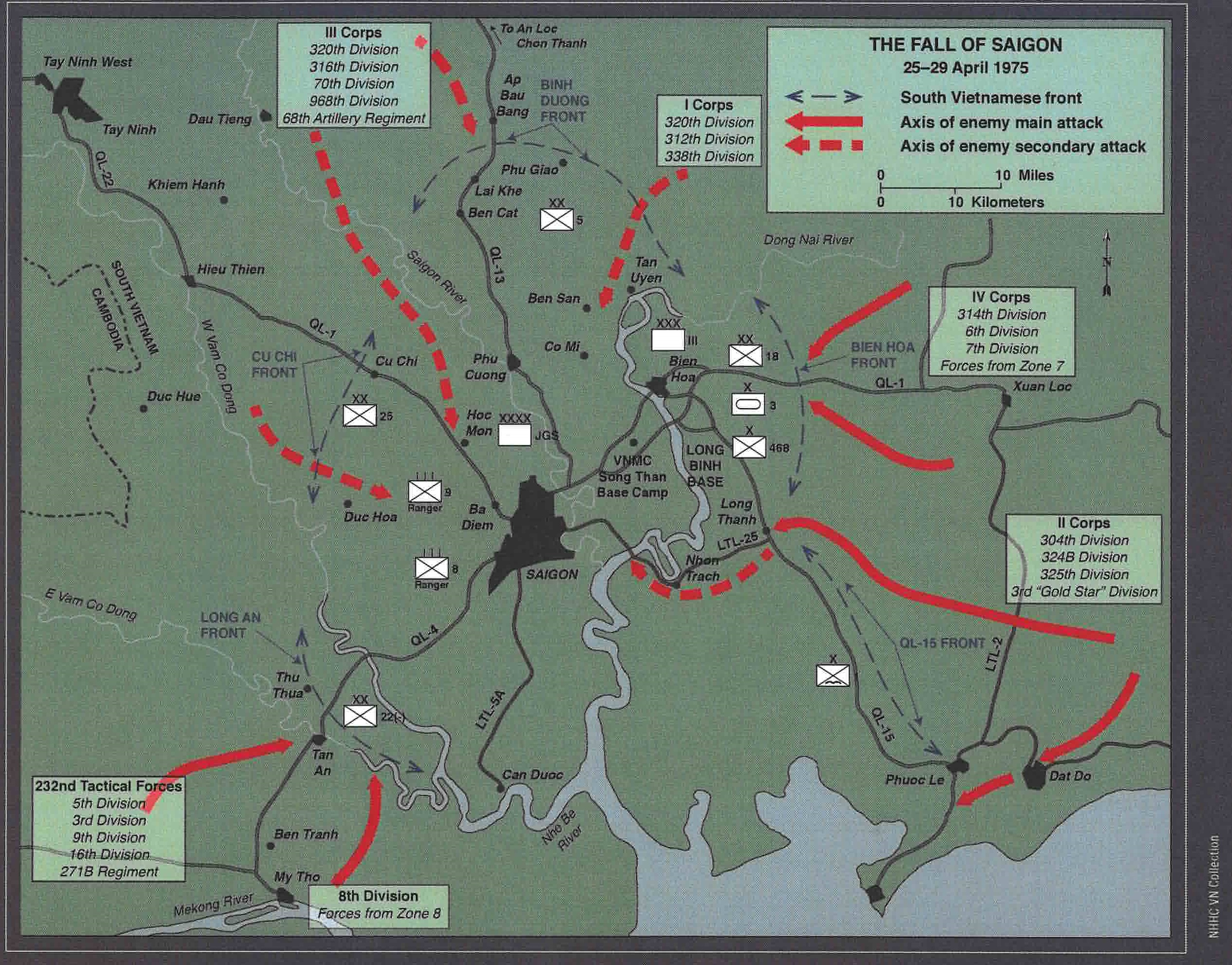
Map showing PAVN encirclement of Saigon

Only one of the Division's three regiments made it to the landing zone where LMS Lam Giang (HQ-402) picked them up on 29 March. About a thousand out of twelve thousands of the Division made it on the ship, the rest were stranded.

Remnants of the Division evacuated by sea from Đà Nẵng were eventually regrouped at Vạn Kiếp National Training Center in Bà Rịa. Over 1,000 troops were temporarily regrouped to form two battalions: one for the 2nd Regiment, and one for the 56th Regiment. On 24 April, the Division was tasked to defend the Bà Rịa / Vũng Tàu region and Route 15, alongside the 14th Marine Battalion, the half-strength 1st Airborne Brigade, the 2nd Squadron of the 15th Cavalry Regiment, and the Phước Tuy Regional Forces (938th Group) under General Hinh.

== Organisation ==
Component units:

- 2nd Infantry Regiment
- 56th Infantry Regiment
- 57th Infantry Regiment
- 30th, 31st, 32nd and 33rd Artillery Battalions
- 11th Armored Cavalry Squadron
- U.S. Advisory Team 155
