= Battle of Duc Duc =

Part of the Vietnam War (1974)

- Part of the Vietnam War
Date	18 July – 4 October 1974
Location	Đức Dục district, Quảng Nam Province, South Vietnam 15.751°N 108.110°E
Result	North Vietnamese Pyrrhic victory

Belligerents
North Vietnam	South Vietnam

Commanders and leaders
Nguyễn Chơn	Gen. Ngô Quang Trưởng; Gen. Nguyễn Duy Hinh

Units involved
36th Regiment; 2nd Division: 1st Regiment; 31st Regiment; 38th Regiment; 10th Sapper Bn.; Fire support: MR5: 572th Artillery Regiment; 573th Air-defense Regiment	3rd Infantry Division: 2nd Infantry Regiment; 56th Infantry Regiment; 11th Cavalry Squadron; 14th Ranger Group: 78th Ranger Battalion; 12th Ranger Group: 29th (or 21st), 37th, 39th Ranger Bn.; Air support: VNAF 1st Air Division

The Battle of Đức Dục took place from 18 July to 4 October 1974 in Đức Dục District, Quảng Nam Province. The North Vietnamese made some minor territorial gains and suffered heavy losses, while South Vietnamese forces were severely weakened by the fighting.

== Background ==
Southwest of Đại Lộc District was the vast mountain district of Duc Duc. Only in the extreme northeast region of Duc Duc did South Vietnamese officials maintain full-time residence. The area west of the Thu Bồn River (Vietnamese: Sông Thu Bồn), which included part of the "Arizona Territory", was insecure and sparsely populated, as were the southern and western reaches of Đức Dục. Army of the Republic of Vietnam (ARVN) influence extended south to the Nông Sơn coal mines in the narrow canyon of the Thu Bồn River, about 10 kilometers from the district seat. Here at a place called Da Trach, not far north of the major operating base of the People's Army of Vietnam (PAVN) 2nd Division, the ARVN maintained a garrison with outposts manned by Regional Force (RF) units and Popular Force (PF) platoons. Đức Dục was the other principal entrance to the Quảng Nam lowlands from the PAVN-held highlands of Quảng Nam and Quảng Tín Provinces.

The ARVN 3rd Infantry Division was responsible for the defense of Quảng Nam and that part of Quảng Tín lying within the Quế Sơn Valley. In June 1974, General Nguyen Duy Hinh, the 3rd Division commander, had his 2nd Infantry Regiment operating in the Gò Nổi (15.851°N 108.208°E) and Đức Dục areas while the 78th Ranger Battalion held Da Trach.

Da Trach, a battalion-sized camp, was a strongpoint situated on a prominent hill about 900-foot (270 m) above the Thu Bồn River south of the subsector headquarters at Đức Dục. It had been quiet at Da Trach and around the outposts manned by one RF company and seven PF platoons. Three of these outposts were in the hills and along the river south of Da Trach, while the others were in the valley of the Khe Le stream (15.7216°N 108.07°E), which flowed into the Thu Bồn River northeast of Da Trach post. Also located in the valley was the 4th Company, 146th RF Battalion, which had its 80-man garrison in the Ap Ba hamlet group (15.6966°N 108.122°E), along the road that twisted eastward over the Deo Le Pass to Quế Sơn. Possession of the Khe Le Valley would give the PAVN not only another flanking approach to the ARVN defenses in the Quế Sơn Valley but would provide access to the several good trails into Duy Xuyên District, bypassing the defenses in Đức Dục.

The 78th Ranger Battalion at Da Trach, with about 360 men, was scheduled for retraining at the Ranger Training Center, and on 17 July 1974, the 3rd Battalion, 56th Infantry, arrived to execute the relief. The infantry battalion pulled in on trucks just before dark. The relief was to take place at noon the next day, but the 78th had withdrawn most of its outposts and was bivouacked for the night in the village. Although unfamiliar with the layout of the camp defenses, the 3rd Battalion, with three of its four companies, assumed the responsibility. The strength of the 3rd Battalion, 56th Infantry, was only about 360 men, but its 2nd Company was not in the camp; rather, it had set up outposts on two hills along the east bank of the Thu Bồn River. One rifle platoon was on Cua Tan Mountain(15.7019°N 108.0437°E) directly across the river from Da Trach, and the rest of the company was at Khuong Que (15.7238°N 108.063°E), to the north.

PAVN Military Region 5 was responsible for all of Quảng Nam Province to the Kon Tum Province boundary, its campaign plan for the summer and autumn of 1974 involved elements of three regular divisions, a separate infantry brigade, and several independent regiments. Objectives ranged from central Quảng Nam to southern Quảng Ngãi Provinces. To cope with the tactical and logistical requirements of this offensive, the PAVN leadership activated a new headquarters, the 3rd Corps. Operational in June, the corps began concentrating resources for the Quảng Nam campaign. The 36th Regiment was formed in the spring of 1974 from replacement groups sent from North Vietnam into the mountains of western Đức Dục. It was a light regiment, having only two infantry battalions, an antiaircraft machine gun company, light artillery, and administrative support units. On 10 July, a week before the planned relief of the 78th Ranger Battalion at Da Trach, the 36th Regiment moved undetected into assembly areas close to ARVN outposts around Da Trach. Also on the move toward Da Trach were elements of all three regiments of the 2nd Division, the 1st, 31st, and 38th, plus the 10th Sapper Battalion, division artillery, and batteries of Military Region 5 artillery.

== Battle ==
Shortly after midnight on 18 July, PAVN artillery, rockets and mortar rounds began exploding on the defenses and outposts of Da Trach. A relatively weak attack by the PAVN 2nd Battalion, 36th Regiment, on the camp's main defenses was beaten back with heavy losses to the PAVN and light casualties to the defenders, but contact with the 2nd Company, 3rd Battalion, 56th Infantry, outposts at Khuong Que and Cua Tan was lost before daybreak. By that time, the 4th Company, 146th RF Battalion at Ap Ba had been attacked and overrun, and the survivors were trying to escape through the mountains toward Đức Dục headquarters. Shelling of the main camp meanwhile had stopped, and the attackers regrouped for another assault. The 2nd Battalion, 1st Infantry Regiment and a battalion of the 31st Infantry Regiment, joined the two battalions of the 36th Regiment for the next attempt. As the reconnaissance platoon and the 4th Company, 3rd Battalion, 56th Infantry, tried to retake a lost outpost south of the camp, they were stopped by intense artillery and automatic weapons fire, which killed the company commander and the battalion commander of the 78th Rangers. The PAVN resumed infantry assaults on the camp, and the 3rd Battalion commander, who had assumed command of the 78th Rangers as well, reported the situation critical. The camp's radio was knocked out before noon, and all contact was lost with whatever PF outposts remained in action. Simultaneously with their assault on Da Trach, the PAVN began the Battle of Thượng Đức to the northwest, stretching the ARVN forces in the area.

PAVN tanks were sighted about 5 km southwest of the camp, and the Republic of Vietnam Air Force (RVNAF) began to provide air support to the defenders. Heavy artillery, rocket, and mortar fire continued, augmented by antiaircraft guns, up to 37 mm, used in direct fire. Contact was also lost with the 4th Company, 78th Rangers, and the two-gun platoon of 105 mm howitzers in the camp had been knocked out of action. At mid-afternoon, the five-battalion PAVN assault, which by this time included the 10th Sapper Battalion against the northern sector, had carried through the southwest defense line. With all bunkers and fighting positions demolished by a bombardment of more than 5,000 rounds, the survivors of the 3rd and 78th Battalions withdrew and the PAVN rounded up civilians in the hamlets and villages; about 7,500 of them would be moved to PAVN controlled regions of Đức Dục District.

Hinh moved a forward division command post to Đại Lộc and ordered the 2nd Infantry Regiment to deploy immediately to Đức Dục and relieve the defenders at Da Trach. Operation Quang Trung 4/74 had begun. Only the 3rd Battalion, 2nd Infantry, was immediately available; the 1st Battalion remained at Firebase Baldy in the Quế Sơn Valley, and the 2nd was still in Quảng Tín Province. Orders were sent to both battalions to move immediately to Đại Lộc District, and the 3rd Battalion moved from Da Nang to Hill 55 in northwestern Điện Bàn District to protect the deployment of artillery to support Đức Dục.

Hinh saw as his first priority securing the bridge over the Thu Bồn River, north of Đức Dục base and over which all division elements would have to pass en route to the battlefield. He ordered the 1st Battalion, 2nd Infantry, just arrived from Firebase Baldy, with the 2nd Troop, 11th Armored Cavalry, to secure the bridge and had the 3rd Battalion, 2nd Infantry, on 18 July move to Đức Dục base. His staff went to work immediately drafting the tactical plan for Quang Trung 4/74 with the objective of retaking Da Trach. The bridge secured, the 1st Battalion joined the 3rd, and both moved south of Đức Dục, prepared to continue on toward Da Trach. By nightfall on the 18th, the 2nd Battalion, 2nd Infantry, had also moved to Đức Dục base, as had a battery of 155 mm howitzers. Meanwhile, a battery of 175 mm guns moved into firing positions in the Quế Sơn Valley, within range of Đức Dục. These ARVN artillery positions soon received heavy and accurate counterbattery fire. The commander of the 2nd Infantry, Lieutenant colonel Vu Ngoc Huong, having assumed tactical command of all ARVN forces in the Đức Dục-Da Trach battlefield, had communications with only two platoons of the original Da Trach defense force by the evening of 18 July.

The PAVN resumed its coordinated offensive in Quảng Nam in the pre-dawn hours of 19 July. A salvo of 35 122 mm rockets fell on Da Nang Air Base, damage to RVNAF operations was slight, although 16 people died and over 70 were wounded many of whom were civilians and military dependents. In the morning Đức Dục received 45 rocket and mortar rounds. PAVN 130 mm guns hit an ARVN 105 mm battery and the 2nd Infantry's command post. Meanwhile, north of Đại Lộc on Route 540, the 370th RF Company repulsed a strong enemy attempt to interdict the ARVN line of communication, killing 30 of the attackers and capturing many weapons.

With the PAVN fire erupting in their rear, the 1st and 3rd Battalions, 2nd Infantry, advanced south from Đức Dục toward Da Trach and by noon reported securing their initial objectives without opposition. The 1st Battalion was on Ky Vi Mountain (15.7522°N 108.133°E), southeast of Đức Dục base, and the 3rd Battalion was on Hill 284 (15.7368°N 108.076°E), past Khuong Que and at the entrance of Khe Le Valley. The 2nd Battalion was in reserve. The plan called for the 3rd Battalion to continue the attack to Cua Tan Mountain, across the river from Da Trach, and for the 1st Battalion to attack south, first seizing Hill 454 (15.727°N 108.144°E) and then descending into the Khe Le Valley at the village of Ap Ba. The feasibility of the plan came into question, however, when the last contact with the Da Trach defenders on 19 July revealed that the command group and two companies of the 78th Rangers were under heavy attack on the hill at Cua Tan.

After seizing Da Trach, the PAVN placed infantry battalions and antiaircraft guns in the hills above the valley, awaiting the arrival of the ARVN 2nd Infantry. The RVNAF struck hard at these forces on the 18th and 19th and caused heavy casualties, but the PAVN could not be dislodged. By the afternoon of 19 July, the 1st Battalion, 2nd Infantry was in contact with elements of the PAVN 36th Regiment on Ky Vi Mountain and on Hill 238 (15.749°N 108.113°E), to the west. The RVNAF flew 18 attack sorties in support, killing 75 PAVN infantrymen and destroying a mortar, but the ARVN advance had to be halted. Suspecting a trap in the Khe Le Valley, Hinh ordered the 2nd Infantry to stop and sent reconnaissance patrols forward.

Correctly anticipating that the PAVN's Quảng Nam campaign had only begun and that more forces would be required to deal with it, I Corps commander General Ngô Quang Trưởng on 19 July ordered the 12th Ranger Group to move from Quảng Ngãi to Quảng Nam. The 37th Ranger Battalion, already in Da Nang for rest and retraining, moved to Hieu Duc District on 20 July. That day, the 6th Infantry, 2nd Division, began relieving the other two battalions of the 12th Ranger Group in Đức Phổ and Mộ Đức Districts in Quảng Ngãi Province, and the 12th began to move north.

By 22 July, the PAVN command at Da Trach apparently realised that the ARVN 2nd Infantry Regiment was not advancing into the trap in the Khe Le Valley. Plans were accordingly changed; the rest of the PAVN 1st Regiment was ordered to Da Trach to attack the ARVN 2nd Regiment in the hills south of Đức Dục, while the 38th Regiment was to move through the hills above the valley toward Gò Nổi and Điện Bàn District. On 24 July the 1st Regiment began moving into the attack, and the 38th Regiment started deploying east. Trưởng was gathering more forces also, he ordered the 29th and 39th Ranger Battalions, 12th Ranger Group, newly arrived from Quảng Ngãi Province, to displace west of Gò Nổi Island, and he directed that the 1st Division in Thừa Thiên Province and the 2nd Division in Quảng Ngãi each prepare one regiment for deployment to Quảng Nam on 24 hours' notice.

On 24 July, the ARVN 2nd Infantry established its command post 700 meters north of Nui Song Suo, the first hill south of Đức Dục. The 2nd Troop, 11th Armored Cavalry, was providing security for the command post. The 2nd Battalion was moving past Hill 238 and advancing on Hill 284, which had been vacated by the 3rd Battalion under strong PAVN pressure. The 3rd Battalion had withdrawn to the hill at Nui Duong Coi (15.758°N 108.071°E), above a lake between it and Đức Dục Subsector, where the 1st Battalion was in reserve. The 1st Battalion, 56th Infantry, attached to the 2nd Infantry, was protecting the regiment's right flank west of the Thu Bồn River.

The attack of the PAVN 1st Regiment met the advancing ARVN 2nd Battalion, 2nd Infantry, on the slopes of Hill 284. The two leading companies of the 2nd Battalion broke under a withering attack. By early afternoon on 24 July, the PAVN attack reached the 3rd Battalion on Nui Duong Coi. The battalion held and with good air and artillery support inflicted heavy casualties on the PAVN, but the assault continued, the 3rd Battalion commander fell wounded, and the battalion began to break. By dusk, both forward battalions of the 2nd Infantry were badly scattered and withdrawing toward Đức Dục. The PAVN attack reached into the rear area of the 2nd Infantry and forced the command post to withdraw 1,000 meters. Seeing a disaster in the making for the 2nd Infantry, Hinh had his division reconnaissance company lifted in by helicopter to help defend the command post. Reaching the command post late in the afternoon, the reconnaissance company was soon joined by the 37th Ranger Battalion and two troops of the 11th Armored Cavalry which Hinh had sent overland to reinforce the beleaguered 2nd Infantry.

On the morning of 25 July, while an attempt was being made to regroup the scattered 3rd Battalion, Hinh ordered the 12th Ranger Group to bring its three battalions forward and relieve the 2nd Infantry. As this relief was beginning, Trưởng had the 1st Division send its 54th Infantry Regiment to Quảng Nam for attachment to the 3rd Division.

The fighting in the hills south of Đức Dục took a heavy toll of the PAVN 1st Regiment and the 2nd Division had to withdraw it from action, just as the ARVN 3rd Division had to relieve the 2nd Infantry. The PAVN 38th Regiment was ordered to stop its eastward movement and come to the relief of the 1st Regiment, while elements of the 31st Regiment still around Hau Duc in Quảng Tín Province were called forward to the division base at Hiệp Đức to prepare to assist the 1st and 38th Regiments. The PAVN plans for the 38th Regiment to move east into Gò Nổi were upset by the rapid ARVN deployment of the 12th Ranger Group. The battered 1st Regiment was no longer equipped to protect the rear of the 38th or its line of communication against the expected counterattacks of the three Ranger battalions of the 12th Group. Further, the PAVN soon learned of the movement of the 54th Regiment to Quảng Nam, but they could not discover its mission or location. Considering these uncertainties, the PAVN command suspended the attack and held its gains, replacing depleted battalions with fresh ones.

Hinh had reached similar conclusions on 25 July. He declared the counterattack to retake Da Trach at an end; Quang Trung 4/74 was over and Quang Trung 8/74, an interim operation to defend the shallow positions south of Đức Dục Subsector, began. By this time virtually all of the survivors of Da Trach had made their way back to South Vietnamese lines: 64 from the 3rd Battalion, 56th Infantry; 79 from the 78th Ranger Battalion; 59 from the 4th Company, 146th RF Battalion; and 20 from the PF platoons.

The 54th Infantry Regiment, arrived in Quảng Nam on 26 July, put its headquarters at Điện Bàn District Town and immediately went into action. While the 1st Battalion took over a security mission in the Da Nang rocket belt near Hill 55, the 2nd and 3rd Battalions began clearing the area around Ky Chau Village on Gò Nổi Island. Both the 2nd and 3rd met heavy resistance and proceeded westward slowly, engaging a PAVN force on 28 July and dispersing it with heavy losses.

Đức Dục and Đại Lộc were struck on 25 July and again the next day by PAVN rocket and artillery fire, but casualties were light. On 26 July, the Rangers completed their relief of the 2nd Infantry and assumed responsibility for the sector. The 21st Ranger Battalion to the east was holding Nui Van Chi, the 37th Ranger Battalion was on Hill 238, just south of Nui Song Su and the 39th Ranger Battalion was at Đức Dục base in reserve. The shattered 2nd Infantry moved west of Đại Lộc District Town along Route 4 to protect the division's right flank, while its 3rd Battalion was being reformed at the division base near Da Nang. Meanwhile, the RVNAF was trying its best to blunt the PAVN attacks. The 1st Air Division flew 67 sorties on the 25th and 57 on the 26th, destroying a tank and several antiaircraft and mortar positions, striking large troop concentrations, and killing about 90 PAVN soldiers.

With the withdrawal of 2d Infantry, Quang Trung 8/74 was declared over on 29 July. Quang Trung 9/74 was to begin on 30 July. The troop list had the 12th Ranger Group in contact south of Đức Dục, the 2nd Infantry on the flank west of Đại Lộc, the 54th in the Gò Nổi east of Đại Lộc and the 1st and 2nd Battalions of the 56th Infantry in reserve in Đại Lộc District Town. The 3rd Battalion, 56th Infantry, the battalion destroyed at Da Trach, was being reformed at Da Nang, while the 78th Ranger Battalion was undergoing the same process at the Dục Mỹ Ranger Training Center in Khánh Hòa Province.

On 29 July 1974, the ARVN 21st Ranger Battalion on the left flank of the Ranger positions protecting Đức Dục base came under heavy attack. Although they inflicted heavy casualties on the PAVN 36th Regiment, the Rangers were forced back about 1,000 meters to the slopes of Nui Duong Coi. The PAVN pursued, and fighting continued in the rough terrain in front of Nui Duong Coi for several days. Then on 3 August, the 36th Regiment launched a strong attack. Several Ranger positions collapsed and the commander of the 12th Ranger Group ordered the 39th Ranger Battalion to assist the 21st. After an all-day battle, the PAVN withdrew and the Rangers regained all lost ground. The RVNAF contributed greatly to the ARVN success; although Ranger casualties were high, more than 35 killed, 100 wounded, and 25 missing, the PAVN left over 200 dead on the field. While the infantry fought in the hills, the PAVN artillery slammed 280 rounds of 122 mm rockets and 100 mm gunfire into the command post of the 12th Ranger Group, casualties were light, however. Fatigued and badly depleted, the 12th Ranger Group was relieved by the 54th Infantry, 1st Division. Through August and early September, the ARVN 54th Infantry made major advances even though the PAVN reinforced the 36th Regiment with the 1st Infantry.

In September, faced with a deteriorating situation north of the Hải Vân Pass, Trưởng ordered the 54th Infantry to return to the 1st Division. Hinh relieved the 54th with his own division's 56th Infantry. Thus, in early September, the infantrymen of the 56th Regiment returned to the hills south of Đức Dục. The 3rd Battalion took up positions on the right, on Khuong Que Hill where its 2nd Company had fought and lost the first engagement of the PAVN's Đức Dục campaign. The 1st Battalion was on the left, on Ky Vi Hill, and the 2nd Battalion was in reserve with the regimental headquarters near Đức Dục base.

On 4 October the PAVN 1st Regiment, 2nd Division, launched simultaneous, heavily supported assaults on both forward battalions of the 56th Regiment. While mortar and artillery fire pounded the 3rd Battalion command post, PAVN sappers entered the headquarters perimeter and severed communications with the two forward ARVN companies. These companies, under infantry attack from the front, withdrew and were caught in a devastating crossfire from the rear and flanks. The 1st Battalion fared little better; its outposts were also overrun, but casualties were lighter. The PAVN coordinated artillery fire with great skill in this assault; a steady rain of shells kept the 56th Regiment's headquarters and the 2nd Battalion from reacting while the two forward battalions were being overrun. As soon as he was able, the regimental commander ordered the attached 21st Ranger Battalion back into the line to relieve the shattered 3rd Battalion.

The PAVN 1st Regiment had accomplished its mission, but casualties were heavy, and it lacked the strength either to pursue or to consolidate its gains. The ARVN defensive line south of Đức Dục remained virtually unchanged, but the 56th Regiment was nearly out of action. Only the 2nd Battalion could put more than 300 men in the field, and the 3rd Battalion had only 200. Hinh had to relieve the regiment again with the 12th Ranger Group.

== Aftermath ==
During the summer and autumn of 1974, the ARVN 3rd Division and attached Rangers had reached exhaustion. More than 4,700 men had been killed, wounded, or were missing in the actions in and around Đức Dục in the three months since the PAVN offensive began at Da Trach on 18 July. A disproportionate number were officers and noncommissioned officers for whom no experienced replacements were available.
