= Hill 327 =

Site information
- Type: Marines/Army

Location
- Coordinates: 16.013°N 108.167°E

Site history
- Built: 1965
- In use: 1965–1972
- Battles/wars: Vietnam War

Garrison information
- Occupants: 3rd Marine Division; 1st Marine Division; 196th Infantry Brigade; ARVN 1st Division; ARVN 3rd Division

Hill 327 (also known as Brigade Ridge, Camp Perdue, Camp Reasoner, Division Hill, Division Ridge or Freedom Hill) is a former U.S. Marine Corps (USMC), U.S. Army and Army of the Republic of Vietnam (ARVN) base southwest of Da Nang in central Vietnam. The base was established on a ridgeline 4 km west of Da Nang Air Base.

== History ==
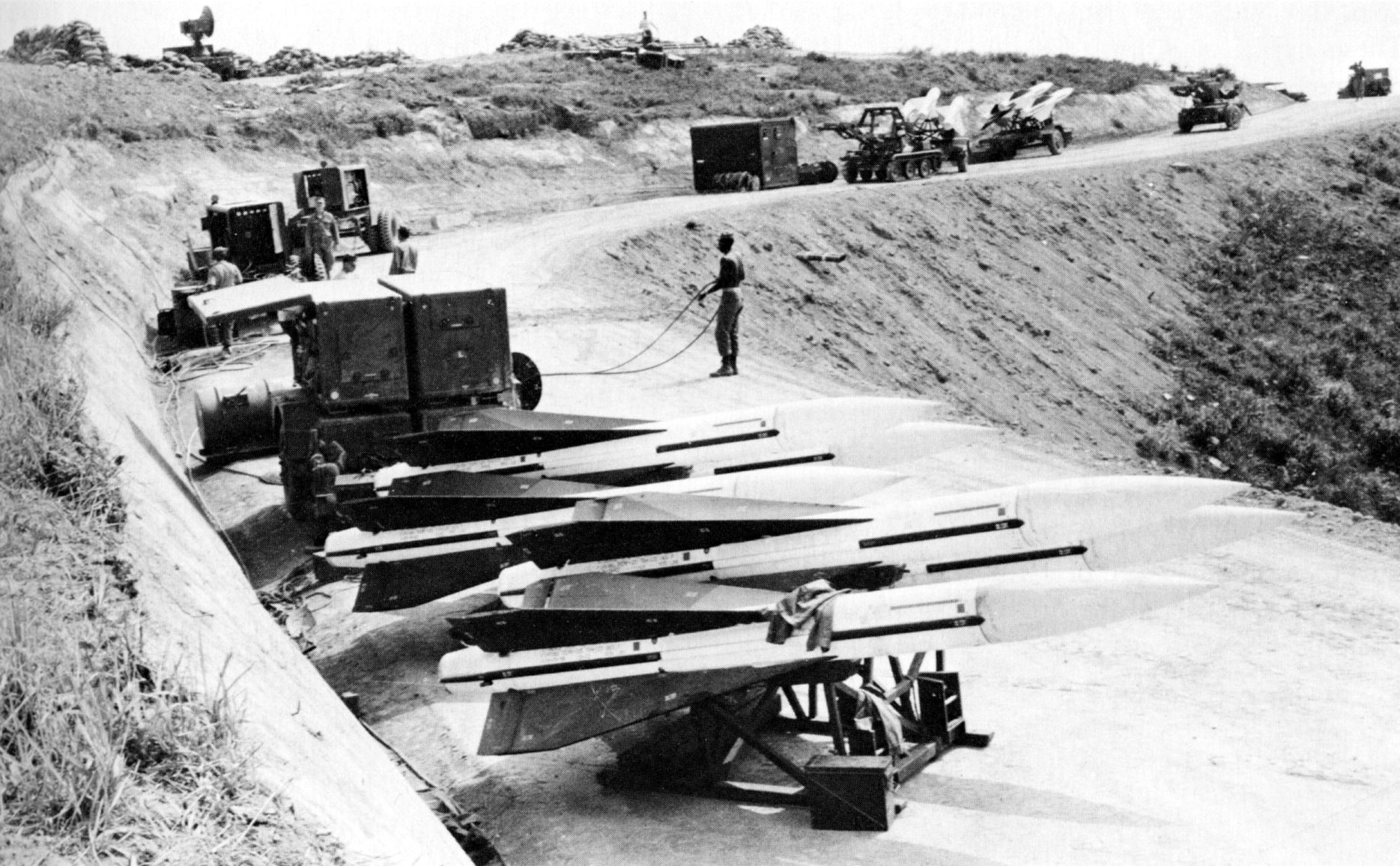
HAWK missiles on Hill 327 in 1965

On 7 February 1965, following the Attack on Camp Holloway, US President Lyndon B. Johnson ordered retaliatory airstrikes against North Vietnam and the deployment of HAWK missiles to South Vietnam to defend against any attacks by the Vietnam People's Air Force (VPAF). The USMC 1st LAAM Battalion based on Okinawa was ordered to deploy to Da Nang. Arriving by C-130 on 8 February, by 9 February the HAWKs were operational at Da Nang AB.

On 8 March 1965, the 9th Marine Regiment made an amphibious landing at Red Beach north of Da Nang while the 1st Battalion 3rd Marines landed at Da Nang AB marking the first deployment of US combat troops to South Vietnam. The 9th Marine Expeditionary Brigade (9th MEB) were tasked with defending Da Nang AB, while overall responsibility for defending the Da Nang area remained with the ARVN. In late March the 3rd Battalion, 9th Marines occupied the Hill 327 ridgeline and Battery B, 1st LAAM Battalion was moved to Hill 327 from the southwest of Da Nang AB.

In July 1965 the Marines began construction of a 3rd Marine Division command post on the Hill 327 ridgeline, the main bunker was 300-foot (91 m) long and 50-foot (15 m) deep and capable of withstanding a direct hit from a 120 mm mortar.

During the Tet Offensive, together with other attacks on US and ARVN facilities in the Da Nang area, at 02:30 on 30 January the Vietcong launched a sapper attack on the 1st Marine Division subsector Bravo command post on Hill 200, 1 km north of the main command post, killing 4 Marines and wounding 7.

On 23 February 1969 as part of the Tet 1969 attacks, the People's Army of Vietnam (PAVN) launched sapper attacks on the northern slope of Hill 327 and on the 2nd Battalion 7th Marines position northwest of the Hill, both attacks were beaten back with 18 Marines killed and 80 wounded while the PAVN lost 75 killed or captured.

In July 1969 the 1st LAAM Battalion ceased operations and redeployed to the US.

On 18 March 1970 the 1st Marine Regiment moved its command post from Hill 55 to Camp Perdue. On 10 August the 1st Battalion 5th Marines assumed responsibility for the defense of Division Ridge. In September the 5th Marine Regiment moved its headquarters from Division Ridge to the area between Landing Zone Baldy and Firebase Ross.

On 24 March 1971 the 2nd Battalion 1st Marines assumed responsibility for the defense of Division Ridge. In late April as part of the general drawdown of U.S. forces, the 23rd Infantry Division took over the Marines tactical area of responsibility and the 196th Infantry Brigade occupied the Marine positions on Division Ridge.

The base remains in use by the PAVN as Trường Bắn 327, with a large military cemetery adjacent to it.
