= Tet 1969 =

North Vietnamese and Viet Cong attacks

1969 Tet Offensive
- Part of Vietnam War
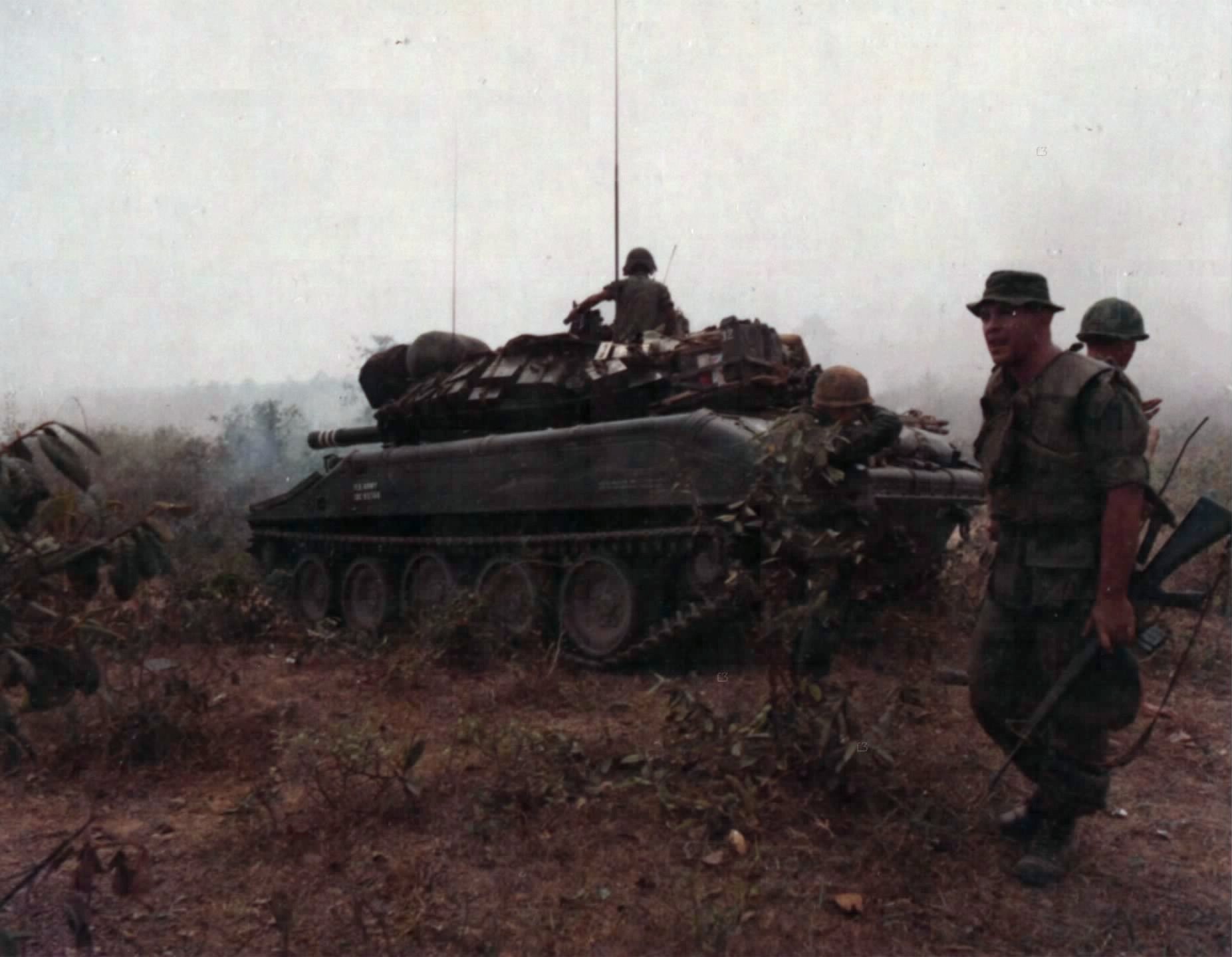
- 1st Squadron, 11th Armored Cavalry Regiment M551 near Long Binh, 23 February 1969
Date	February 1969
Location	Near Saigon and Da Nang, South Vietnam
Result	Allied victory

Belligerents
United States; South Vietnam	Viet Cong; North Vietnam

Tet 1969 refers to the attacks mounted by the People's Army of Vietnam (PAVN) and Viet Cong (VC) in February 1969 in South Vietnam during the Vietnam War, one year after the original Tet Offensive.

Most attacks centered on military targets near Saigon and Da Nang and were quickly beaten off. Some speculate that the attacks were mounted to test the will of the new U.S. President Richard Nixon who retaliated by secretly bombing PAVN/VC sanctuaries in Cambodia the following month.

Numerous bases were attacked. These attacks were all beaten back but did inflict casualties and reinforced the fact that PAVN/VC forces were able to mount attacks at will.

== Long Binh/Bien Hoa ==
Intelligence had indicators of the pending attacks. On 19 February, a defector surrendered to Army of the Republic of Vietnam (ARVN) forces and revealed a large VC force would attack key installations in the Saigon area to include Long Binh Post. Unfortunately, the reporting was delayed and did not reach Long Binh until the morning of 22 February 1969, the day the defector warned the attacks were set to begin.

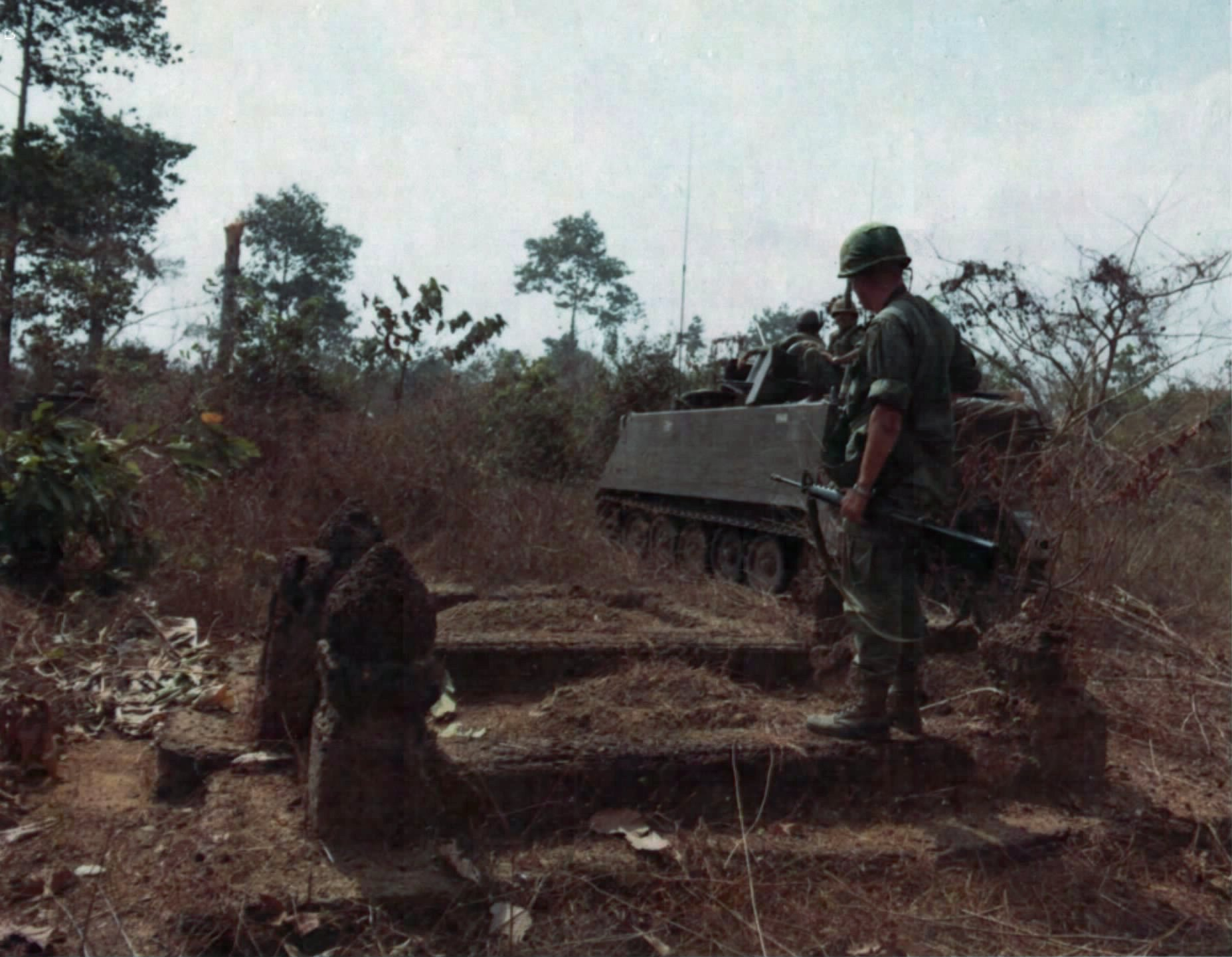
Men of the 1st Squadron 11th Armored Cavalry Regiment, halt their M113s in a Vietnamese cemetery near Long Binh, 23 February 1969

After sundown on the 22nd, elements of the VC 274th Regiment, 5th Division made their final preparations while occupying three hills along Highway 15 approximately three kilometers south of the base. That evening, several ambush squads from the 720th Military Police Battalion, 18th MP Brigade kept watch along potential avenues of approach to Long Binh Post. One of the MP ambush squads held a position within a kilometer of the VC stronghold. At 02:00 on 23 February, the 274th VC Regiment initiated their attack with an estimated 78 rounds of rocket and mortar fire from their positions. The rounds landed on post with some igniting the POL fuel site east of the highway.

The VC made several attempts to advance on the base, but were halted. Full-scale sweeping operations to secure the perimeter began just after noon that day. M113 armored personnel carriers and M551 Sheridan armored reconnaissance vehicles supported the forces on the ground while AH-1 Cobra gunships and OH-6 helicopters provided air support. These units made occasional contact, often with PAVN or VC who fought stubbornly from trenches and spider holes.

In the early morning hours of 26 February, a force of approximately 400 men from the VC 275th Regiment, 5th Division, had infiltrated into the tiny village of Thai Hiep on the outskirts of Bien Hoa. About 85 per cent of the force was estimated to be PAVN soldiers. At about 03:00, as reconnaissance elements of the unit were observed and engaged by US Air Force security forces at the perimeter of Bien Hoa Air Base, the villagers began to flee their homes, running down streets and creek beds. The villagers met elements of the South Vietnamese 5th Marine Battalion, the 3rd Battalion, 48th Infantry Regiment, 18th Division and the 3rd Squadron, 5th Armored Cavalry moving on the road less than 0.5 miles (0.80 km) from Thai Hiep in response to the contact at the air base. The villagers told the ARVN forces how they were driven out of their homes and confined to an area near a creek running alongside the village. At that time, the air base security forces reported that they had lost contact with the enemy reconnaissance element which withdrew east toward Thai Hiep. The ARVN units swiftly moved into blocking positions, and by daybreak, the PAVN/VC were surrounded. Additional South Vietnamese Regional Force elements moved in and the ARVN troops continued to contain the PAVN/VC forces until 11:00 when assault forces, in the form of the ARVN 36th Ranger Battalion, reinforced the contact. By 15:00 the 36th Ranger Battalion moved into the village attacking the PAVN/VC force. The series of assaults met heavy resistance by the battalion of PAVN who had turned the villagers sandbagged shelters into a series of well-fortified defensive positions. ARVN psychological operations units broadcast repeated loud-speaker appeals and warnings, and all of the remaining villagers and several wounded PAVN/VC evacuated out of Thai Riep. Just after 16:00 US Air Force F-100s and F-4s along with Republic of Vietnam Air Force A-1 Skyraiders were directed against the PAVN/VC positions in the village. Following the employment of the supporting fires, the 36th Ranger Battalion moved back into the village. The Rangers met only slight, disorganized resistance. By 01:00 the next morning, the bodies of 264 PAVN/VC soldiers lay in the village, and 87 had been captured or surrendered. More than 100 individual and crew-served weapons were captured. ARVN casualties were 10 killed and 100 wounded and one US Army photographer was killed. The prisoners revealed that their mission had been to attack Bien Hoa city and the Bien Hoa Air Base.

== Da Nang ==
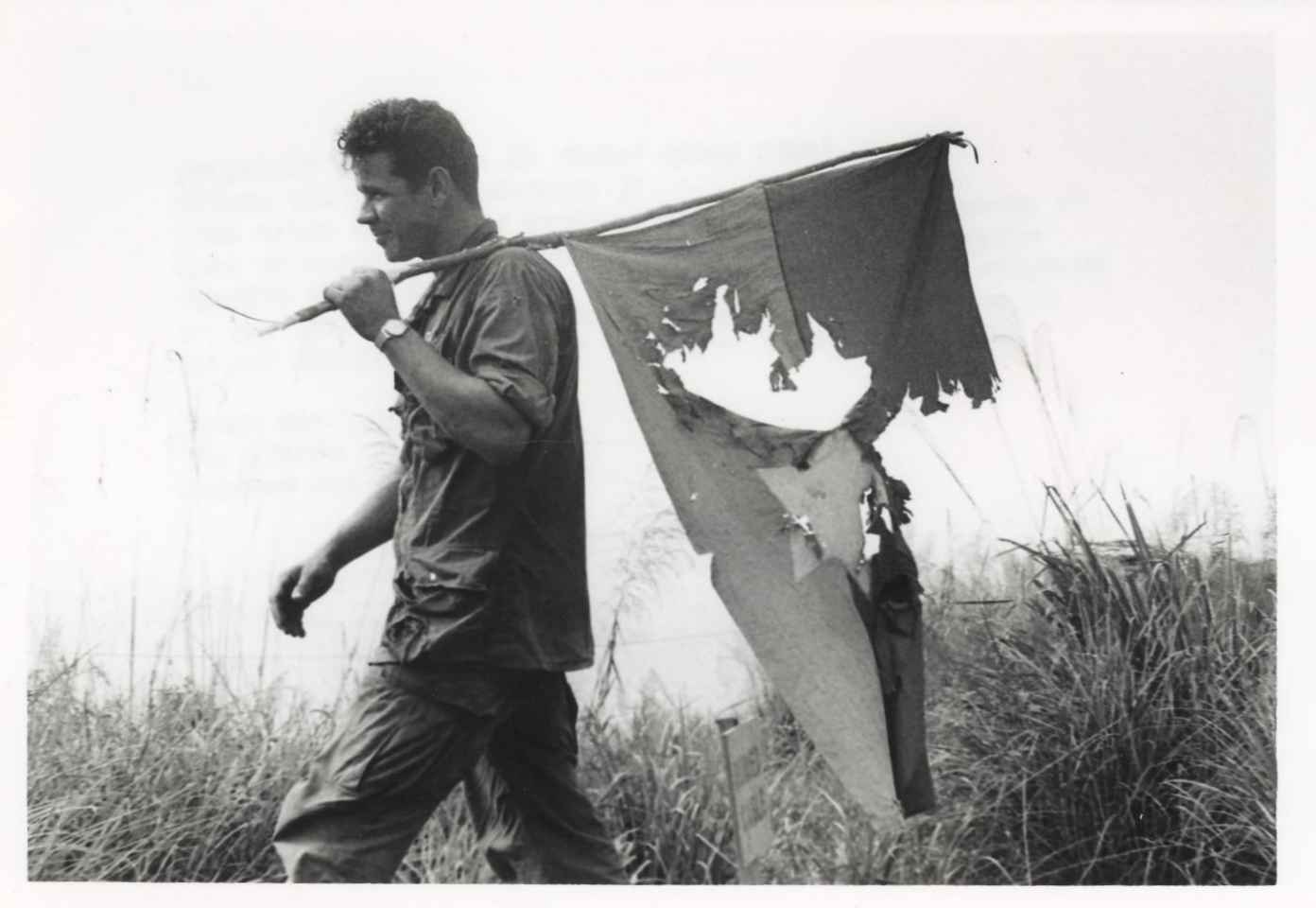
Marine Air Support Squadron 3 Marine carries a shredded Viet Cong flag after an attack west of Da Nang

Since early February 1969, the 1st Marine Division had noted an upsurge in PAVN/VC activity around Da Nang. On 7 February Company D, 1st Battalion, 26th Marines found a PAVN/VC base area near the Nam O bridge northwest of the Red Beach Base Area, leaving the base untouched, they returned at night setting up a series of ambushes that killed 18 PAVN and captured two. On 8 February patrols from 3rd Battalion, 7th Marines found seven 122mm rockets 14 km southwest of Da Nang and another 13 140mm rockets 2 km further south. On 18 February a Company F, 2nd Battalion, 1st Marines called in artillery fire on a group of PAVN/VC 5 km south of Marble Mountain resulting in 21 secondary explosions believed to be from detonating rockets. Also in mid-February Company D, 1st Battalion, 7th Marines engaged an entrenched PAVN platoon 22 km southwest of Da Nang killing 30 and the ARVN 2nd Battalion, 51st Regiment operating 4 km west of the Marines killed 49 PAVN moving north of Go Noi Island.

After midnight on 23 February Company K, 3rd Battalion, 1st Marines and Company D, 1st Military Police Battalion detected VC approaching the Cầu Đỏ River bridges and attacked them killing 47 and capturing 11. A 70-strong VC force attacked the 2/1 Marines command post 6 km south of Marble Mountain losing 17 dead.

To the west of Da Nang, shortly after midnight on the 23rd Company M, 3/7 Marines ambushed a PAVN force killing 10 and later that night a larger force was spotted and artillery fire was called in. On searching the site at dawn it was found that two PAVN 81mm mortar teams had been destroyed in the barrage.

Before dawn on 23 February, the first day of Tết, the PAVN/VC fired 25 122mm rockets at Da Nang's deep water port hitting an ARVN ammunition dump and a fuel tank farm at Da Nang Air Base and cause minor damage to an A-6A and six helicopters at the Air Base. Later that day rockets hit the An Hoa Combat Base destroying 15,000 rounds of artillery ammunition and igniting 40,000 gallons of aviation fuel and 50 rockets were fired at Naval Support Activity Da Nang with more than half going into the sea and the remainder causing minor damage.

At dawn PAVN sappers attacked the 1st Marine Division headquarters on Hill 327 and the 2/7 Marines command post to the northwest. These attacks were repulsed for Marines losses of 18 killed and more than 75 PAVN killed.

After dawn on 23 February a VC unit was detected near the Hòa Vang District and the Marine security force killed six and captured two and forced the rest of the unit to retreat into a cemetery where they were attacked by the ARVN 21st Ranger Battalion the next day losing a further 57 killed.

Meanwhile to the west 3/7 Marines continued to engage PAVN forces, forcing them into three pockets along the Song Tuy Loan river. Two of the pockets were destroyed by the next morning resulting in the capture of the acting commander of the 141st Regiment. The last pocket along the An Tan ridgeline proved more difficult and Company L, 3/7 Marines suffered numerous casualties forcing it to withdraw. On the morning of 26 February following Napalm and Snake Eye air strikes, Company L, reinforced by Company M assaulted the PAVN position making slow progress against determined PAVN resistance. The attack continued into 27 February when the Marines overran the PAVN resulting in a total of more than 200 killed.

PAVN/VC retreating to the south from Da Nang were intercepted by elements of the 1st Marine Regiment and ARVN 1st Battalion, 51st Regiment 11 km south of Da Nang losing 139 dead in three days of fighting.

The PAVN/VC attacks on Da Nang were a failure resulting in more than 500 dead.
