= Battle of Thượng Đức (1974) =

Part of the Vietnam War (1974)

Battle of Thượng Ðức (1974)
- Part of the Vietnam War
Date	29 July – 11 November 1974
Location	15.852°N 107.948°E; Quảng Nam Province, South Vietnam
Result	See "Aftermath"

Belligerents
North Vietnam	South Vietnam

Commanders and leaders
Hoàng Đan; Lê Công Phê; Nguyễn Ân	Ngô Quang Trưởng; Nguyễn Duy Hinh; Lê Quang Lưỡng

Units involved
324th Division: 29th Regiment; 304th Division: 66th Regiment; 24th Regiment; 2nd Division: 31st Regiment; Fire support: MR5: 572th Artillery; 573th Air-defense; 574th Armored	14th Ranger Group: 79th Ranger Battalion; 3rd Infantry Division: 2nd/2nd Infantry Bn.; 1st/57th Infantry Bn.; 11th Cavalry Squadron; Airborne Division: 1st Brigade; 3rd Brigade; Air support: VNAF: 1st Air Division

Casualties and losses
North Vietnam claims: 921 dead and 2,000+ wounded South Vietnam claims: 2,000+ dead and 5,000+ wounded	500+ dead and nearly 2,000 wounded (Airborne Division only); North Vietnam claims: 5,000 killed or captured

The Battle of Thượng Ðức was fought during the Vietnam War from 29 July to 11 November 1974.

== Background ==
Thượng Ðức District was located 40 km southwest of Danang. It was accessible by a single road, local Route 4 which followed the north bank of the Vu Gia River, passed through a narrow defile between the hills and the river and then entered the district town of Thượng Ðức. The Vu Gia River valley was only 3 km wide here; steep hills overlooked Thượng Ðức town on the north, west, and south. There were no villages outside the district town itself secure enough for South Vietnamese officials to spend the night, and only three villages in the district had government administration by day. People's Army of Vietnam (PAVN) lines of communication from the northwest and southwest reached Thượng Ðức via Route 14, which terminated there, and Route 614, which began in the large PAVN logistical complex south of the A Sau Valley and joined Route 4 west of Thượng Ðức. This district, therefore, was a key entrance to the Quảng Nam Province lowlands.

== Battle ==
On 18 July 1974, the PAVN 29th Regiment, 324th Division overran the An Hoa Industrial Complex and then on 29 July attacked the town of Thượng Ðức, which was defended by the Army of the Republic of Vietnam (ARVN) 79th Ranger Battalion. The PAVN shelling of Thượng Ðức was followed by infantry assaults on all outposts. Communication was quickly broken between Thượng Ðức Subsector and three Popular Force outposts. Contact was also lost with two Ranger outposts in the hills west of the town. ARVN artillery on Hill 52 (15.856°N 108.002°E), near Đại Lộc District, gave effective support to the Thượng Ðức defense and PAVN casualties were high. Early on the morning of 30 July, the subsector commander was wounded by the continuing heavy bombardment, but all ground attacks were repulsed. Later that morning Republic of Vietnam Air Force (VNAF) observers saw a convoy of tanks and artillery approaching along Route 4 west of Thượng Ðức, and subsequent air strikes halted the column, destroying three tanks. As PAVN attacks continued throughout the day, the Rangers took their first prisoner of war, and identified the presence of the 29th Regiment on the battlefield.

In an assault on 31 July, PAVN infantrymen reached the perimeter wire of Thượng Ðức. The Ranger battalion commander asked for artillery fire directly on his command post. With the PAVN occupying the high ground above Route 4 east of Thượng Ðức, the ARVN 3rd Division commander General Nguyễn Duy Hinh and I Corps commander General Ngô Quang Trưởng believed that the forces available to them were inadequate to relieve Thượng Ðức. To protect his flank, Hinh had placed the battered 2nd Infantry Regiment on the road west of Đại Lộc, but it was not strong enough to move west along Route 4. More fire support for Thượng Ðức was provided, however, when Hinh moved a platoon of 175mm guns to Hieu Duc. Conditions in the Thượng Ðức perimeter were serious but not yet critical. Most of the South Vietnamese bunkers and trenches had collapsed under heavy artillery fire, the PAVN controlled the airstrip just outside the camp, and casualties were 13 killed and 45 wounded. Although the intensity of the PAVN bombardment dropped off between 31 July and 1 August, Ranger casualties continued to mount. PAVN gunners shifted their concentrations to 2nd Infantry positions and artillery batteries near Đại Lộc, causing moderate casualties and damaging four howitzers. The Ranger commander at Thượng Ðức asked for medical evacuation for his wounded, but the commander of the VNAF 1st Air Division advised that air evacuation would not be attempted until the PAVN antiaircraft guns around Thượng Ðức had been neutralized. Meanwhile, Trưởng ordered one M48 tank company to move immediately from northern I Corps to Quảng Nam for attachment to the 3rd Division; he told Hinh to keep the tank company in reserve and to employ it only in an emergency. Hinh then formed a task force to attack west from Đại Lộc and relieve the Rangers at Thượng Ðức. The tank company from Tân Mỹ Base, in Thừa Thiên province, arrived in Da Nang in good order on 1 August, and Hinh's task force, composed of the 2nd Infantry and the 11th Armored Cavalry Squadron, prepared for the march to Thượng Ðức.

On 2 August, with only light attacks by fire striking the camp, the Ranger battalion resumed patrolling beyond its perimeter. On 4 August Ranger patrols discovered 53 PAVN bodies killed by VNAF air strikes in the hills southwest of Thượng Ðức, but attempts at air evacuation of ARVN casualties failed when VNAF sorties against six antiaircraft positions south of the camp were unable to silence the guns. The next day, the first indication of another committed PAVN regiment was revealed when the 2nd Battalion, 2nd Infantry, captured a soldier from the 29th Regiment east of Thượng Ðức. According to the prisoner, the entire 29th Regiment was positioned in the hills overlooking Route 4 between Hill 52 and Thượng Ðức, while a regiment of the 304th Division had been given the mission to seize Thượng Ðức. Events proved this interrogation to be accurate. The 2nd Battalion had fought all afternoon in the rice paddies and hills north of Route 4. Slowly moving toward Thượng Ðức it was still 4 km east of the ARVN fire base on Hill 52, which itself was under PAVN artillery and infantry attack. By 5 August, the 2nd Battalion was still struggling to move forward along the foothills north of Route 4, and the 1st Battalion, 57th Infantry, reinforcing the 2nd Regiment, was stopped by heavy PAVN machine gun fire from the hills west of Hill 52. Back at Thượng Ðức, the situation was rapidly becoming critical as ammunition and food supplies were being exhausted. The VNAF attempted a resupply drop on the camp on 5 August but all eight bundles of food and ammunition fell outside the perimeter. The VNAF tried to destroy bundles that were within reach of the PAVN, and one A-37 Dragonfly attack plane was shot down in the attempt. The next day, while the relief task force was battling its way west against heavy resistance, Trưởng, concerned about the critical threat to Da Nang from a large PAVN force west of Đại Lộc, ordered fresh reinforcements to Quảng Nam. Appealing personally to General Cao Văn Viên at the Joint General Staff in Saigon, Trưởng succeeded in getting the 1st Airborne Brigade released from the general reserve for deployment to Quảng Nam and attachment to Hinh's 3rd Division. The brigade was ordered to reach Da Nang by 11 August with three airborne infantry battalions and one artillery battalion. Additionally, the 3rd Airborne Brigade, then deployed in the defense of Huế, was told to prepare for movement to Đà Nẵng.

On the night of 6 August the most intense PAVN bombardment of the battle began hitting Thượng Ðức with over 1,200 rounds, including many from 130mm guns, landing inside the perimeter. The first wave of infantrymen was repulsed that night, but the assault at dawn on 7 August using 37mm anti-aircraft guns as direct fire weapons against the Rangers' positions penetrated the defense. At midmorning, the Ranger commander reported that he had started a withdrawal and soon radio contact was lost. The PAVN claim to have killed or captured 1,600 ARVN and shot down 13 aircraft in the fighting up to 7 August.

The first contingent of the 1st Airborne Brigade was flown into Da Nang on 8 August 1974, the day after the 79th Ranger Battalion was driven out of Thượng Ðức. Meanwhile, the brigade's heavy equipment was moving up the coast from Saigon on Republic of Vietnam Navy boats. On 11 August Trưởng ordered the 3rd Airborne Brigade to deploy with three airborne battalions to Da Nang. By 14 August, the brigade headquarters and the 2nd, 3rd and 6th Battalions were in Quảng Nam, Brigadier General Lê Quang Lưỡng, commanding the Airborne Division, established his command post at Marble Mountain Air Facility southeast of Da Nang.

A steep ridge extended north from the Vu Gia River and Route 4. The low hills at the southern foot of the ridge had been seized by the PAVN 29th Regiment, which had blocked the ARVN task force's relief of the Rangers at Thượng Ðức. The highest point on the ridge was about 6 km north of Route 4 on Hill 1235, but Hill 1062 (15.904°N 107.984°E), about 2 km south of Hill 1235 and 5 km northeast of Thượng Ðức, offered the best observation of the road and Đại Lộc. Having placed an observation post on Hill 1062, the PAVN was delivering accurate artillery fire on ARVN positions in Đại Lộc. Consequently, the first mission assigned to the Airborne Division was the capture of Hill 1062 and the ridge south to the road. To deal with the threat developing west of Da Nang, the 3rd Airborne Brigade was assigned the secondary mission of blocking the western approaches in Hieu Duc District. The 8th and 9th Airborne Battalions began the attack and made their first firm contact with elements of the 29th Regiment on 18 August east of Hill S2, the same area in which the 3rd Division Task Force had run into strong resistance. For an entire month, these battalions doggedly pressed forward along the ridge toward Hill 1062. In the meantime, having sustained heavy casualties, the 29th Regiment brought in reinforcements. The PAVN 3rd Corps ordered the 31st Regiment, 2nd Division, to Thượng Ðức to relieve the 66th Regiment, 304th Division, so that the 66th could be deployed in support of the 29th, which was steadily giving ground to attacking Airborne troops. Additionally, the 24th Regiment, 304th Division, arrived in the battle area in early September. Finally, on 19 September, the 1st Airborne Brigade reported that it had troopers on Hill 1062. While the ARVN was taking nearly two weeks to consolidate the controlling terrain along this section of the ridge, the 66th Regiment relieved the severely depleted 29th, and elements of the 24th Regiment joined the fight against the 1st Airborne Brigade. By 2 October, the brigade was in possession of the high ground, and the 2nd and 9th Battalions were digging in on the ridge to the south. About 300 PAVN soldiers were killed in this phase of the battle on Hill 1062, and seven prisoners were taken.

During the weeks that followed, the 1st Airborne Brigade fought off repeated attempts by the 304th Division to retake the ridge. Making skillful use of air and artillery support, the brigade managed to hold on despite the heavily supported assaults of superior numbers. In one incident, when the PAVN 24th Infantry was allowed to penetrate the defenses on Hills 383 and 126 and advance directly into a killing zone of preplanned artillery fires, nearly 250 of the attacking force was killed. By mid-October. The 1st Airborne Brigade had also taken heavy casualties, and the four battalions in the hills above Thượng Ðức were down to about 500 men each. Estimated PAVN losses were over 1,200 killed during the first half of October and 14 captured. The PAVN, nevertheless, was determined to regain the dominating heights. On 29 October the reinforced 24th Regiment began another assault on Hill 1062, this time firing large concentrations of Tear gas. This assault carried to the highest position on the ridge, forcing an airborne battalion to withdraw. On 1 November, Hill 1062 was again in PAVN hands.

Meanwhile, in Thua Thien Province, PAVN pressure against the lightly held Huế defenses was becoming severe, and Trưởng was receiving strongly phrased requests from his elements north of the Hải Vân Pass to return at least some of the Airborne Division. Trưởng resisted and ordered Lưỡng to retake Hill 1062. The attack began on 8 November, and three days later ARVN troopers were back on the ridge. They established new defensive positions on the slopes, leaving the furrowed, shattered crest to the dozens of PAVN dead who remained there. Although heavy fighting continued in the hills and on the ridge for several more weeks as the Airborne Division expanded its control of critical terrain, the most violent phase of one of the bloodiest battles since the cease-fire was over.

== Aftermath ==
The Airborne Division had lost nearly 500 of its soldiers killed since its commitment in Quảng Nam Province on 15 August, nearly 2,000 had been wounded. PAVN casualties were estimated to be about 2,000 killed and 5,000 wounded, however, PAVN claimed only 921 deaths and more than 2,000 wounded. The PAVN claim to killed or captured almost 5,000 ARVN in this period. Seven of the nine airborne battalions had fought in the 3-month campaign, and by mid-November six of these were on Hill 1062. The PAVN had observation of the Airborne positions from the heights of Hill 1235, but Lưỡng could not muster enough force to take this peak and still defend what he had. Similarly, the PAVN lacked the forces to counterattack in strength. By the end of 1974, all but two airborne battalions were withdrawn from Hill 1062. The remaining 1st and 7th Battalions kept patrols there and depended on artillery fires to deny the terrain to PAVN occupation, but placed their main battle positions near Dong Lam Mountain, about 4 km to the east, and in the ridges above Hill 52. The rainy season had reached Quảng Nam Province in October and provided some respite from the intense and continual combat of summer. Both sides needed this time to recuperate and prepare for the next dry season offensive.

The Battle of Thượng Ðức was costly for both sides. Despite successfully stalling the PAVN advance, the ARVN failed to recapture the town due to shortages of supplies and replacement troops. In the opinion of one ARVN commander, the PAVN goal had been to secure the left flank of I Corps to continue the building of the eastern corridor of the Ho Chi Minh Trail, while another believed that had it not been for the actions of the Airborne, Da Nang would have fallen in 1974. Moreover, the ARVN suffered irreplaceable losses among its elite forces and expended large amounts of ordinance which could not be replaced due to decreased U.S. aid. The 304th Division was rendered combat ineffective and would play only a marginal role in the 1975 Spring Offensive, however ARVN intelligence did not appreciate the 304th's weakness and so Trưởng maintained substantial forces west of Da Nang to counter any thrust by the 304th from Thượng Ðức.

The PAVN and Viet Cong were subsequently able to overrun ARVN camps at Hòn Chiêng, Núi Gai, Động Mông, Lạc Sơn and Đá Hàm and forced the ARVN to withdraw to Cấm Dơi and Quế Sơn.
