= Tiên Phước district =

Coordinates: 15.500°N 108.300°E

Tiên Phước district Huyện Tiên Phước
- District
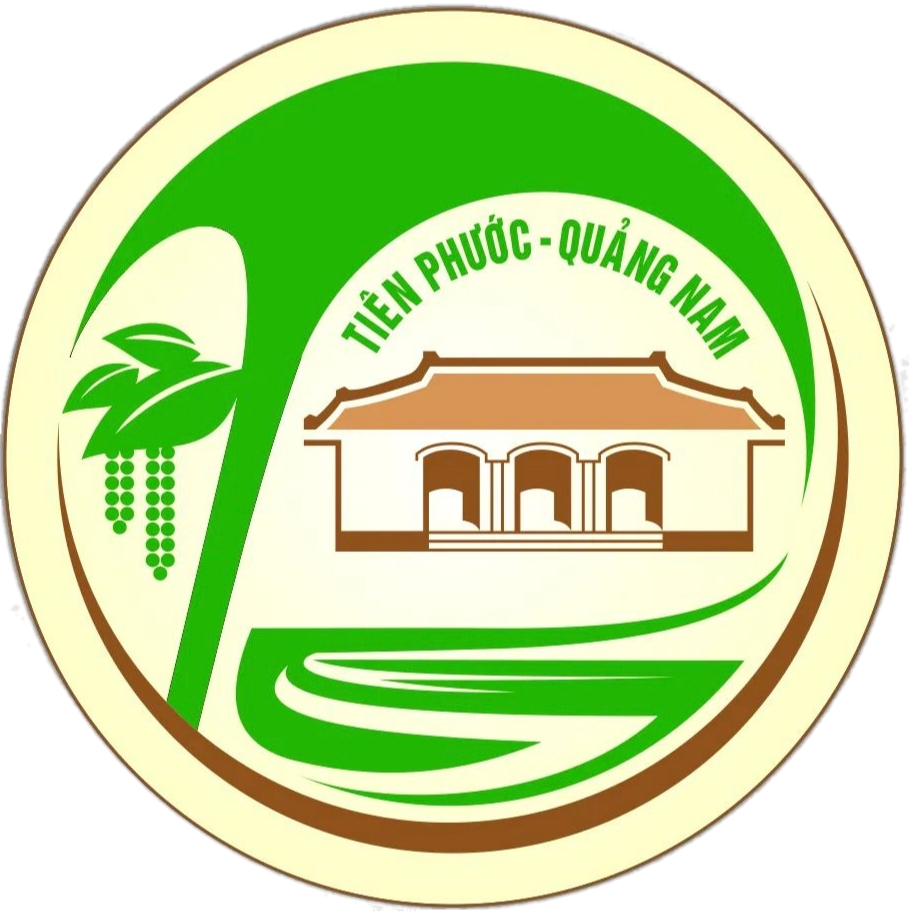
- Seal
- Interactive map of Tiên Phước district
- Country: Vietnam
- Region: South Central Coast
- Province: Quảng Nam
- Capital: Tiên Kỳ

Area
  - Total: 175 sq mi (453 km^{2})

Population (2003)
  - Total: 81,900
- Time zone: UTC+7 (Indochina Time)

Tiên Phước is a former rural district (huyện) of Quảng Nam province in the South Central Coast region of Vietnam. As of 2003 the district had a population of 73,717. The district covers an area of 453 km^{2} (175 sq mi). The district capital lies at Tiên Kỳ.
