= Operation Frequent Wind =

1975 American operation of Vietnam War

- Part of the Fall of Saigon, Vietnam War
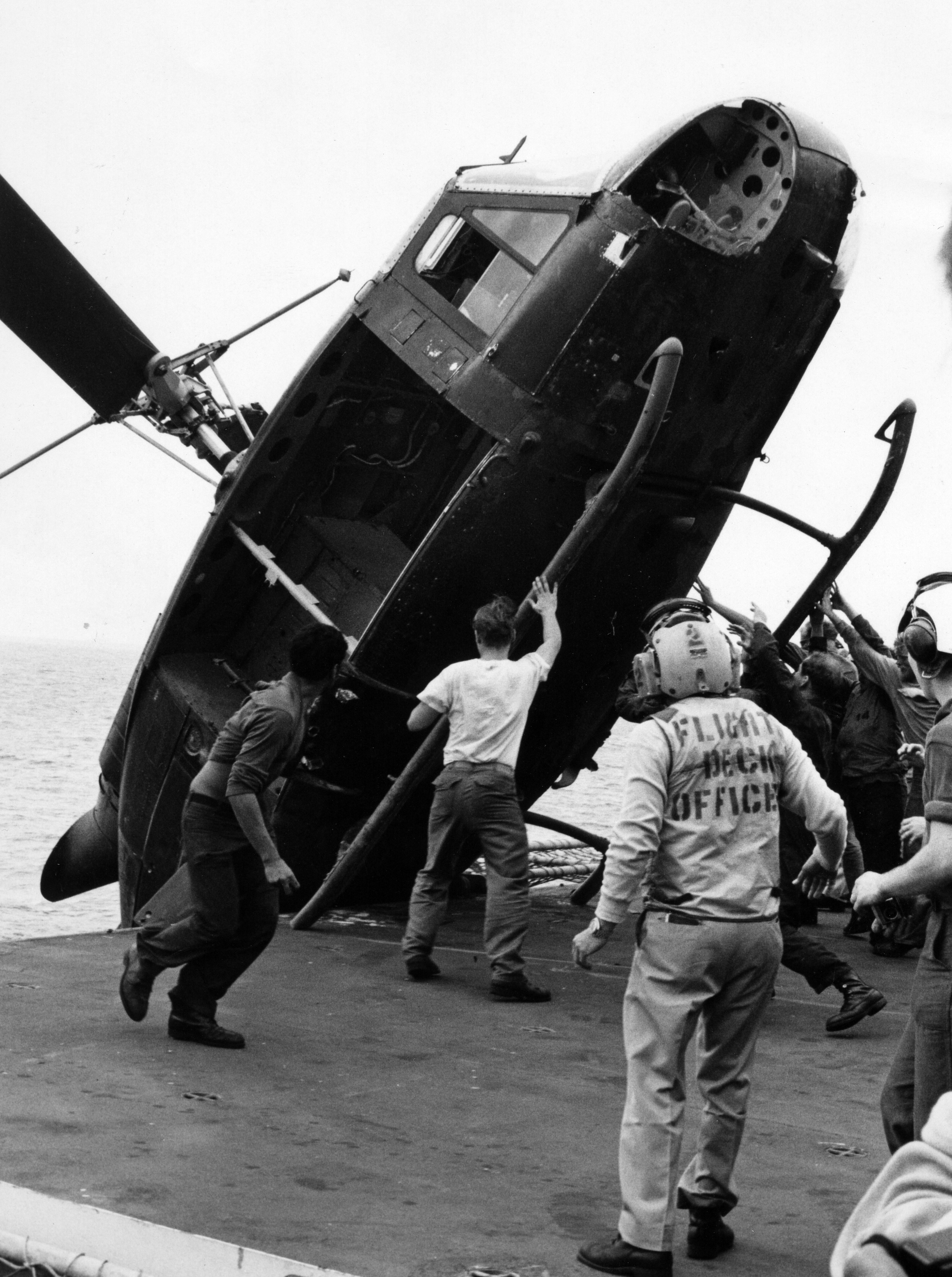
- A South Vietnamese helicopter is pushed overboard from USS Okinawa to clear deck space for more incoming helicopters
Date	29–30 April 1975
Location	Saigon, 17 nautical miles (31 km) from the Vũng Tàu Peninsula
Result	Successful evacuation

Belligerents
United States; South Vietnam	North Vietnam; Viet Cong

Commanders and leaders
(United States) Gerald Ford (United States) George P. Steele (United States) Richard E. Carey (United States) Don Whitmire	(North Vietnam) Văn Tiến Dũng

Casualties and losses
2 killed in action 2 missing at sea	Unknown

Operation Frequent Wind was the final phase in the evacuation of American civilians and "at-risk" Vietnamese from Saigon, South Vietnam, before the takeover of the city by the North Vietnamese People's Army of Vietnam (PAVN) in the Fall of Saigon. It was carried out on 29–30 April 1975, during the last days of the Vietnam War. More than 7,000 people were evacuated by helicopter from various points in Saigon. The airlift resulted in several enduring images.

Evacuation plans already existed as a standard procedure for American embassies. At the beginning of March, fixed-wing aircraft began evacuating civilians from Tan Son Nhat Airport through neighboring countries. By mid-April, contingency plans were in place and preparations were underway for a possible helicopter evacuation. As the imminent collapse of Saigon became evident, the U.S. Navy assembled Task Force 76 off the coast near Vũng Tàu to support a helicopter evacuation and provide air support if required. In the event, air support was not needed as the North Vietnamese paused for a week at the outskirts of Saigon, possibly waiting for the South Vietnamese government to collapse and avoiding a confrontation with the U.S. by allowing the mostly-unopposed evacuation of Americans from Saigon.

On 28 April, Tan Son Nhut Air Base (next to the airport) came under artillery fire and attack from Vietnamese People's Air Force aircraft. The fixed-wing evacuation was terminated and Operation Frequent Wind began. During the fixed-wing evacuation 50,493 people (including 2,678 Vietnamese orphans) were evacuated from Tan Son Nhut. The evacuation took place primarily from the Defense Attaché Office compound, beginning around 14:00 on 29 April, and ending that night with only limited small arms damage to the helicopters. The U.S. Embassy in Saigon was intended to be only a secondary evacuation point for embassy staff, but it was soon overwhelmed with evacuees and desperate South Vietnamese. The evacuation of the embassy was completed at 07:53 on 30 April, but some Americans chose to stay or were left behind and some 400 third-country nationals were left at the embassy.

Tens of thousands of Vietnamese evacuated themselves by sea or air. With the collapse of South Vietnam, numerous boats and ships, Republic of Vietnam Air Force (RVNAF) helicopters and some fixed-wing aircraft sailed or flew out to the evacuation fleet. Helicopters began to clog ship decks and eventually, some were pushed overboard to allow others to land. Pilots of other helicopters were told to drop off their passengers and then take off and ditch in the sea, from where they would be rescued. In Operation Frequent Wind a total of 1,373 Americans and 5,595 Vietnamese and third-country nationals were evacuated by helicopter. The total number of Vietnamese evacuated by Frequent Wind or self-evacuated and ending up in the custody of the United States for processing as refugees to enter the United States totalled 138,869.

== Planning ==
Minutes of President Gerald Ford's National Security Council meeting on 9 April 1975 when evacuation plans were extensively discussed

Planning for the evacuation of the Americans and their South Vietnamese allies from South Vietnam had begun before April 1975. When U.S. President Gerald Ford met with the National Security Council on 9 April 1975 he was told by Henry Kissinger that a maximum of 1.7 million people had been identified as possible evacuees and that these included: American citizens and their relatives, the diplomatic corps, the International Commission of Control and Supervision (ICCS), third-country nationals under contract by the U.S. government and the employees of the U.S. and their dependents (estimated at 200,000 people). In addition, the Vietnamese relatives of American citizens and senior Government of Vietnam officials and their dependents (about 600,000 people) were also identified as potential evacuees, along with Vietnamese formerly employed by the U.S. and their dependents.

Although American officials at the highest levels of the intelligence community (e.g. CIA Director William Colby) were certain that the South Vietnamese government would collapse, the U.S. government underestimated the speed of the North Vietnamese advance during the 1975 Spring Offensive and how quickly the Army of the Republic of Vietnam (ARVN) would collapse.

Evacuation plans are standard for American embassies. The Saigon plan had been developed over several years. Originally codenamed "Talon Vise", the operation was renamed "Frequent Wind" when the original codename was compromised.

By 1975, the Frequent Wind plan aimed to evacuate about 8,000 U.S. citizens and third-country nationals, but it was never able to estimate the number of South Vietnamese to include. There were about 17,000 at-risk Vietnamese on embassy rolls, which, using an average of seven dependents per family, meant that the number requiring evacuation was 119,000. Taken with other categories of Vietnamese, the number quickly passed 200,000. The Frequent Wind plan set out four possible evacuation options:

- Option 1: Evacuation by commercial airlift from Tan Son Nhut and other South Vietnamese airports as required
- Option 2: Evacuation by military airlift from Tan Son Nhut and other South Vietnamese airports as required
- Option 3: Evacuation by sea lift from Saigon port
- Option 4: Evacuation by helicopter to US Navy ships in the South China Sea

With Option 4, the helicopter evacuation would be expected to be similar to Operation Eagle Pull, the American evacuation by air of Phnom Penh, Cambodia, on 12 April 1975.

== Preparations on the ground ==
On 1 April an evacuation control center manned by U.S. Army, U.S. Navy, U.S. Air Force (USAF) and U.S. Marine Corps (USMC) personnel began operating at the Defense Attaché Office (DAO) compound on 12-hour shifts, increasing to 24-hour shifts the next day. Also on 1 April, Plan Alamo was implemented to defend the DAO compound and its annex so it could serve as a holding area for 1,500 evacuees for five days. By 16 April, Alamo was complete: water, C-rations, petroleum, oil, and lubricants had been stockpiled; backup electricity generators had been installed; sanitary facilities were completed; and concertina wire protected the perimeter.

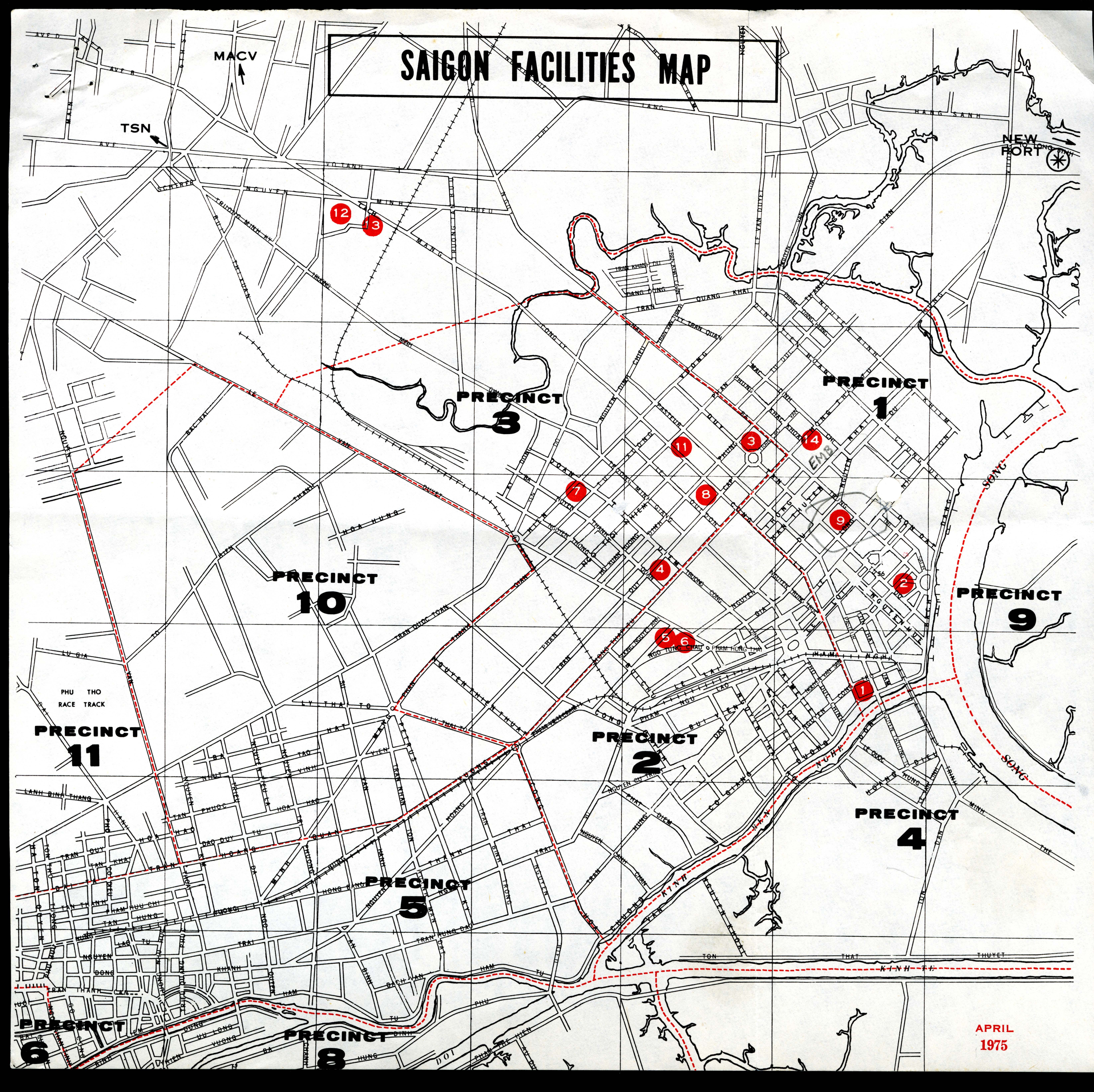
Map of Assembly Points for American personnel in Saigon

On 7 April Air America pilot Nikki A. Fillipi, with U.S. Marine Corps Lieutenant Robert Twigger, assigned to the DAO as the U.S. Navy liaison officer, surveyed 37 buildings in Saigon as possible landing zones (LZ), selecting 13 of them as fit for use. Workers from Pacific Architects and Engineers visited each of the 13 LZs to remove obstructions and paint 'H's the size of a UH-1 Huey helicopter's skids. President Ford, in an address to the American public on 11 April, promised to evacuate Vietnamese civilians of various categories. The 9th Marine Amphibious Brigade (9th MAB), which was to supply helicopters and a security force for the evacuation, sent a delegation to consult with Ambassador Graham Martin on current plans on 12 April. Martin told them that he would not tolerate any outward signs that the United States intended to abandon South Vietnam. All planning would have to be conducted with the utmost discretion. Brigadier General Richard E. Carey, commander of the 9th MAB, flew to Saigon the next day to see Martin; he later said, "The visit was cold, non-productive and appeared to be an irritant to the Ambassador". Thirteen Marines from the Marine Security Guard (MSG) detachment were deployed to the DAO Compound on 13 April to replace eight Marine guards who had been providing security after they were withdrawn from the closed Da Nang and Nha Trang consulates.

By late April, Air America helicopters were flying several daily shuttles from TF76 to the DAO Compound to enable the 9th MAB to conduct evacuation preparations at the DAO without exceeding the Paris Peace Accords' limit of 50 U.S. military personnel in South Vietnam. The U.S. government was continuing to observe its obligations under the Accords, notwithstanding the North Vietnamese invasion. In late April, the MSG Marines were ordered to abandon Marshall Hall/Marine House, their billet at 204 Hong Thap Tu Street (now 204 Nguyen Thi Minh Khai Street), and move into the recreation area in the embassy compound.

The two major evacuation points chosen for Operation Frequent Wind were the DAO Compound next to Tan Son Nhut Airport for American and Vietnamese civilian evacuees, and the U.S. Embassy, Saigon for embassy staff. The plan for the evacuation included stationing buses and American civilian bus drivers at 28 buildings throughout metropolitan Saigon. The buses would follow one of four planned evacuation routes from downtown Saigon to the DAO Compound, each route named after a Western Trail: Santa Fe, Oregon, Texas, etc.

== Options 1 and 2: fixed-wing evacuation ==
By late March, the embassy began to reduce the number of U.S. citizens in Vietnam by encouraging dependents and non-essential personnel to leave the country by commercial flights and on Military Airlift Command (MAC) C-141 and C-5 aircraft, which were still bringing in emergency military supplies. In late March, two or three of these MAC aircraft were arriving each day and were used to evacuate civilians and Vietnamese orphans. On 4 April, a C-5A aircraft carrying 250 Vietnamese orphans and their escorts suffered explosive decompression over the sea near Vũng Tàu and made a crash-landing while attempting to return to Tan Son Nhut; 153 people on board died in the crash.

With the cause of the crash still unknown, the C-5 fleet was grounded and the MAC airlift was reduced to using C-141s and C-130s. Rather than loading as many evacuees as possible, each evacuee was required to have a seat and a seatbelt, reducing the number of passengers that could be carried on each flight to 94 in a C-141 and 75 in a C-130. But these restrictions were relaxed and eventually ignored altogether as the pace of the evacuation quickened. Armed guards were also present on each flight to prevent hijacking. American commercial and contract carriers continued to fly out of Tan Son Nhut, but with decreasing frequency. In addition, military aircraft from Australia, Indonesia, Iran, Poland, the United Kingdom, France, and other countries flew in to evacuate their embassy personnel.

Throughout April, the "thinning out" proceeded slowly, largely because the South Vietnamese government was slow to issue papers allowing Americans to take Vietnamese dependents with them, with the result that MAC aircraft were often departing empty. Finally, on 19 April, a simple procedure was implemented that cleared up the paperwork jam and the number of evacuees dramatically increased. The fall of Xuân Lộc on 21 April and the resignation of President Nguyễn Văn Thiệu on 21 April brought greater crowds seeking evacuation to the DAO Compound as it became apparent that South Vietnam's days were numbered. By 22 April, 20 C-141 and 20 C-130s flights a day were flying evacuees out of Tan Son Nhut to Clark Air Base, some 1,000 miles away in the Philippines. On 23 April President Ferdinand Marcos of the Philippines announced that no more than 2,500 Vietnamese evacuees would be allowed in the Philippines at any one time, further increasing the strain on MAC which now had to move evacuees out of Saigon and move some 5,000 evacuees from Clark Air Base on to Guam, Wake Island and Yokota Air Base. President Thiệu and his family left Tan Son Nhut on 25 April on a USAF C-118 to go into exile in Taiwan. Also on 25 April the Federal Aviation Administration banned commercial flights into South Vietnam. This directive was subsequently reversed; some operators had ignored it anyway. In any case this effectively marked the end of the commercial airlift from Tan Son Nhut.

On 27 April, PAVN rockets hit Saigon and Cholon for the first time since the 1973 ceasefire. U.S. officials decided to stop using the less maneuverable C-141s, which had been loaded with up to 316 evacuees, and use only C-130s, which had been taking off with more than 240.

== Task Force 76 ==
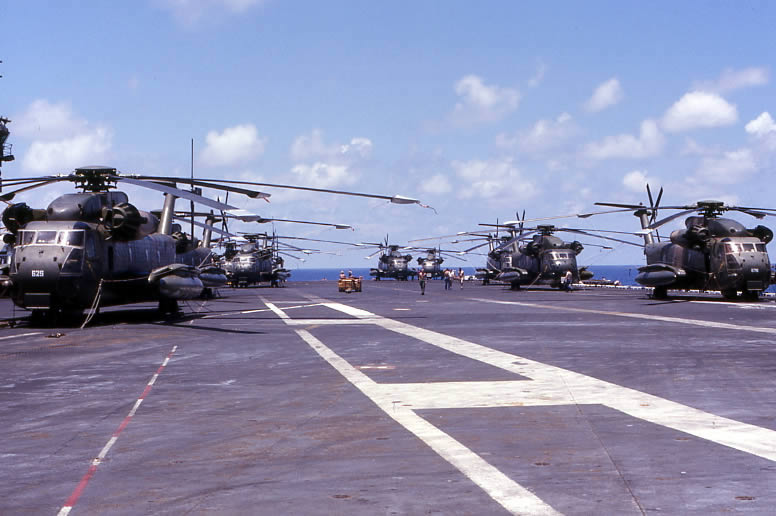
US Air Force HH-53 helicopters on the deck of USS Midway during Operation Frequent Wind, April 1975

Map showing the disposition of U.S. Navy ships at the start of Operation Frequent Wind

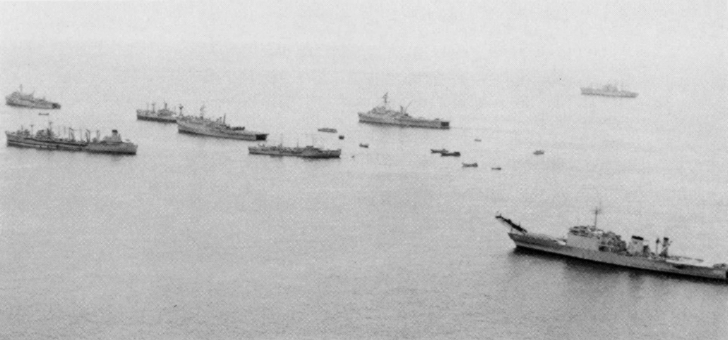
Ships of TF 76 wait off Vũng Tàu for the start of the operation

With the fall of Saigon imminent, between 18 and 24 April the U.S. Navy assembled ships off Vũng Tàu under Commander Task Force 76, RADM Don Whitmire.

Task Force 76

- USS Blue Ridge (command ship)
- USS Oklahoma City (Seventh Fleet flagship)

Task Group 76.4 (Movement Transport Group Alpha)

- USS Okinawa
- USS Vancouver
- USS Thomaston
- USS Peoria

Task Group 76.5 (Movement Transport Group Bravo)

- USS Dubuque
- USS Durham
- USS Frederick

Task Group 76.9 (Movement Transport Group Charlie)

- USS Anchorage
- USS Denver
- USS Duluth
- USS Mobile

The task force was joined by:

- USS Hancock
- USS Midway

each carrying Marine, and Air Force (eight 21st Special Operations Squadron CH-53s and two 40th Aerospace Rescue and Recovery Squadron HH-53s) helicopters.

Amphibious ships:

- USS Mount Vernon
- USS Barbour County
- USS Tuscaloosa

A guided missile frigate:

- USS Worden

and eight destroyer types for naval gunfire, escort, and area defense, including:

- USS Richard B. Anderson
- USS Cochrane
- USS Kirk
- USS Gurke
- USS Rowan
- USS Cook
- USS Bausell

The USS Enterprise and USS Coral Sea carrier attack groups of Task Force 77 in the South China Sea provided air cover while Task Force 73 ensured logistic support.

The Marine evacuation contingent, the 9th Marine Amphibious Brigade (Task Group 79.1), consisted of three Battalion Landing Teams (BLT); 2nd Battalion, 4th Marines (2/4), 1st Battalion 9th Marines (1/9), 3rd Battalion 9th Marines (3/9) and three helicopter squadrons HMH-462, HMH-463, HMM-165 along with other support units from Marine Aircraft Group 39 (MAG-39).

In addition, a flotilla of Military Sealift Command (MSC) ships were assembled and these carried out seaborne evacuations from Saigon Port, this fleet comprised:

Tugboats:

- Asiatic Stamina
- Chitose Maru
- Haruma
- Osceola
- Shibaura Maru

and the following large transport ships:

- SS American Challenger
- SS Boo Heung Pioneer
- SS Green Forest
- SS Green Port
- USNS Greenville Victory
- SS Pioneer Contender
- SS Pioneer Commander
- USNS Sgt. Truman Kimbro
- USNS Sgt. Andrew Miller

== Tan Son Nhut under attack ==
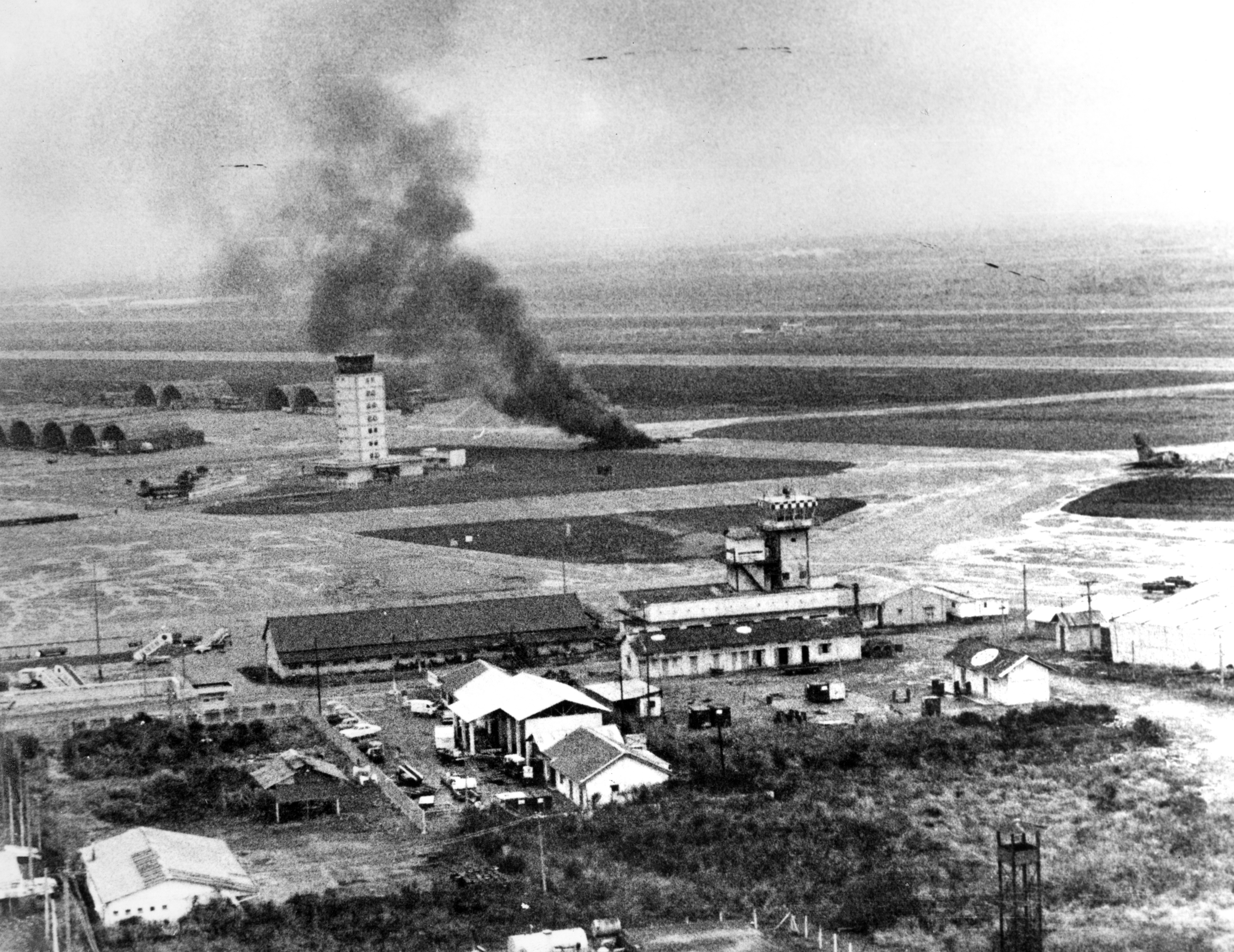
RVNAF C-130A burns at Tan Son Nhut after rocket attack on 29 April

On 28 April at 18:06, three A-37 Dragonflies piloted by former RVNAF pilots, who had defected to the Vietnamese People's Air Force at the fall of Da Nang, dropped six Mk81 250 lb bombs on Tan Son Nhut Air Base, destroying several aircraft. RVNAF F-5s took off in pursuit, but they were unable to intercept the A-37s. C-130s leaving Tan Son Nhut reported receiving PAVN 12.7 mm and 37 mm anti-aircraft (AAA) fire, while sporadic PAVN rocket and artillery attacks also started to hit the airport and air base. C-130 flights were stopped temporarily after the air attack but resumed at 20:00 on 28 April. At 21:00 on 28 April Major General Homer D. Smith, the Defense Attaché, informed the evacuation control center that 60 C-130 flights would come in on 29 April to evacuate 10,000 people.

At 03:30 on 29 April a PAVN rocket hit Guardpost 1 at the DAO Compound, instantly killing Marine Corporals Charles McMahon and Darwin Judge. They were the last American ground casualties in Vietnam.

At 03:58, C-130E, #72-1297, flown by a crew from the 776th Tactical Airlift Squadron, was destroyed by a 122 mm rocket while taxiing to pick up refugees after offloading a BLU-82 at Tan Son Nhut Air Base. The crew evacuated the burning aircraft on the taxiway and departed the airfield on another C-130 that had previously landed. This was the last USAF fixed-wing aircraft to leave Tan Son Nhut. Between 04:30 and 08:00 up to 40 artillery rounds and rockets hit around the DAO Compound.

At dawn the RVNAF began to haphazardly depart Tan Son Nhut Air Base as A-37s, F-5s, C-7s, C-119s and C-130s departed for Thailand while UH-1s took off in search of the ships of TF-76. Some RVNAF aircraft stayed to continue to fight the advancing PAVN. One AC-119 gunship had spent the night of 28/29 April dropping flares and firing on the approaching PAVN. At dawn on 29 April two A-1 Skyraiders began patrolling the perimeter of Tan Son Nhut at 2,500 feet (760 m) until one was shot down, presumably by an SA-7 missile. At 07:00 the AC-119 was firing on PAVN to the east of Tan Son Nhut when it too was hit by an SA-7 and fell in flames to the ground.

At 07:00 on 29 April, Smith advised Ambassador Martin that fixed-wing evacuations should cease and that Operation Frequent Wind, the helicopter evacuation of US personnel and at-risk Vietnamese should commence. Martin refused to accept Smith's recommendation and instead insisted on visiting Tan Son Nhut to survey the situation for himself. At 10:00 Martin confirmed Smith's assessment and at 10:48 he contacted Washington to recommend Option 4, the helicopter evacuation. Finally at 10:51 the order was given by CINCPAC to commence Option 4; due to confusion in the chain of command, Carey did not receive the execute order until 12:15. At 08:00 Lieutenant General Minh, commander of the RVNAF and 30 of his staff arrived at the DAO compound demanding evacuation, signifying the complete loss of RVNAF command and control.

== Option 4 – White Christmas in April ==
In preparation for the evacuation, the American Embassy had distributed a 15-page booklet called SAFE, short for "Standard Instruction and Advice to Civilians in an Emergency." The booklet included a map of Saigon pinpointing "assembly areas where a helicopter will pick you up." There was an insert page which read: "Note evacuational signal. Do not disclose to other personnel. When the evacuation is ordered, the code will be read out on Armed Forces Radio. The code is: The temperature in Saigon is 105 degrees and rising. This will be followed by the playing of I'm Dreaming of a White Christmas." Frank Snepp later recalled the arrival of helicopters at the embassy while the song was playing over the radio as a "bizarre Kafkaesque time". Japanese journalists, concerned that they would not recognize the tune, had to get someone to sing it to them.

After the evacuation signal was given, the buses began to pick up passengers and head to the DAO Compound. The system worked so efficiently that the buses were able to make three return journeys rather than the expected one. The biggest problem occurred when the ARVN unit guarding the main gate at Tan Son Nhut refused to allow the last convoy of buses into the DAO Compound at about 17:45. As this was happening, a firefight between two ARVN units broke out and caught the rearmost buses in the crossfire, disabling two of the vehicles. Eventually the ARVN commander controlling the gates agreed to permit the remaining buses to enter the compound. General Carey's threat to use the AH-1J SeaCobra helicopter gunships flying overhead may have played a role in the ARVN commander's decision.

== Security and air support ==
It was not known whether the PAVN and/or the ARVN would try to disrupt the evacuation and so the planners had to take all possible contingencies into account to ensure the safety and success of the evacuation. The staff of 9th MAB prescribed altitudes, routes, and checkpoints for flight safety for the operation. To avert mid-air collisions, the planners chose altitudes which would provide separation of traffic and also a capability to see and avoid the enemy's AAA, SA-2 and SA-7 missile threat (6,500 feet (2,000 m) for flights inbound to Saigon and 5,500 feet (1,700 m) for those outbound from Saigon to the Navy ships). These altitudes were also high enough to avoid small arms and artillery fire.

In the event that the PAVN or ARVN shot down a helicopter or a mechanical malfunction forced one to make an emergency landing in hostile territory, two orbiting CH-46s of MAG-39 each carrying 15-man, quick-reaction "Sparrow Hawk" teams of Marines from 1st Platoon, Company A, 1st Battalion, 9th Marines, from USS Blue Ridge, were ready to land and provide security enabling a search and rescue helicopter to pick up the crew. In addition, two CH-46s would provide medical evacuation capabilities while AH-1J SeaCobras would fly cover for the transport helicopters and for any ground units who requested support. The SeaCobras could also serve as Forward Air Controllers.

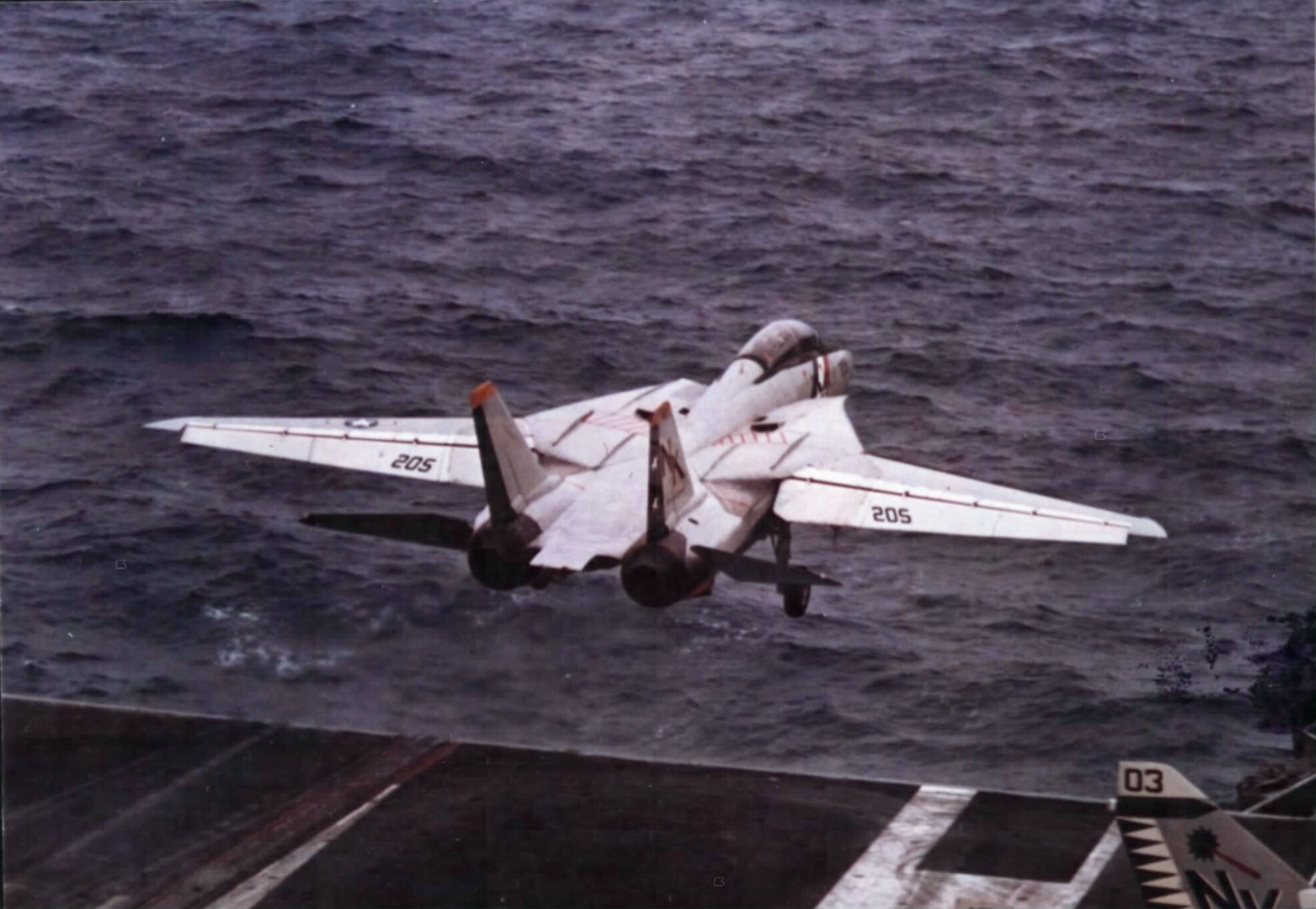
An F-14A Tomcat from VF-2 is launched from USS Enterprise, 29 April 1975

The air wings of USS Enterprise and USS Coral Sea were ready to provide close air support and anti-aircraft suppression if required with their A-6 and A-7 attack aircraft, and would provide continuous fighter cover the evacuation route including by VF-1 and VF-2, flying from Enterprise with the first combat deployment of the new F-14A Tomcat. USAF aircraft operating out of Nakhon Phanom Air Base, Korat Air Base and U-Tapao Air Base in Thailand were also overhead for the duration of the helicopter evacuation. A C-130 Airborne Command and Control controlled all US air operations over land. USAF F-4s, F-111s and A-7s provided air cover during daylight, being replaced by AC-130s from the 16th Special Operations Squadron at night. Strategic Air Command KC-135 tankers provided air-to-air refueling.

The evacuation proceeded without interference from the PAVN. Aircraft flying air cover for the evacuation reported being tracked with surface to air radar in the vicinity of Biên Hòa Air Base (which had fallen to the PAVN on 25 April), but there were no missile launches. The Hanoi leadership, reckoning that completion of the evacuation would lessen the risk of American intervention, had apparently instructed General Dũng not to target the airlift itself. Members of the police in Saigon had been promised evacuation in exchange for protecting the American evacuation buses and control of the crowds in the city during the evacuation. Disgruntled ARVN troops repeatedly hit American helicopters with small arms fire throughout the evacuation, without causing serious damage. Despite receiving sporadic PAVN AAA fire, USAF and USN aircraft made no attacks on AAA or SAM sites during the evacuation. However, one USAF report states that an F-4C Wild Weasel and an F-4D of the 388th Fighter Wing, was patrolling between Tan Son Nhut and Bien Hoa about 16:00 when the Wild Weasel detected SAM radar emissions to the north. It immediately turned toward the threatening radar and fifteen to twenty anti-aircraft weapons opened up on it and the F-4D. The four crew members estimated they received more than 500 rounds of 23 mm, 37 mm, and 57 mm fire in one minute. After receiving permission from the airborne commander, the Wild Weasel marked the three 57-mm sites with an AGM-45 Shrike missile and took evasive action to escape the tracers coming in. Then the F-4D was cleared to destroy the 57 mm battery and did so with two CBU-71 and two CBU-58 Cluster bombs, neutralizing the site, 10 miles (16 km) northeast of Saigon, without damage to either aircraft.

Despite all the concern over these military threats, the weather presented the gravest danger. At the beginning of the operation, pilots in the first wave reported the weather as 2,000 feet (610 m) scattered, 20,000 feet (6,100 m) overcast with 15 miles (24 km) visibility, except in haze over Saigon, where visibility decreased to one mile. This meant that scattered clouds existed below their flight path while a solid layer of clouds more than two miles above their heads obscured the sun. The curtain of haze over Saigon so altered the diminished daylight that line of sight visibility was only a mile. The weather conditions deteriorated as the operation continued.

== Air America ==
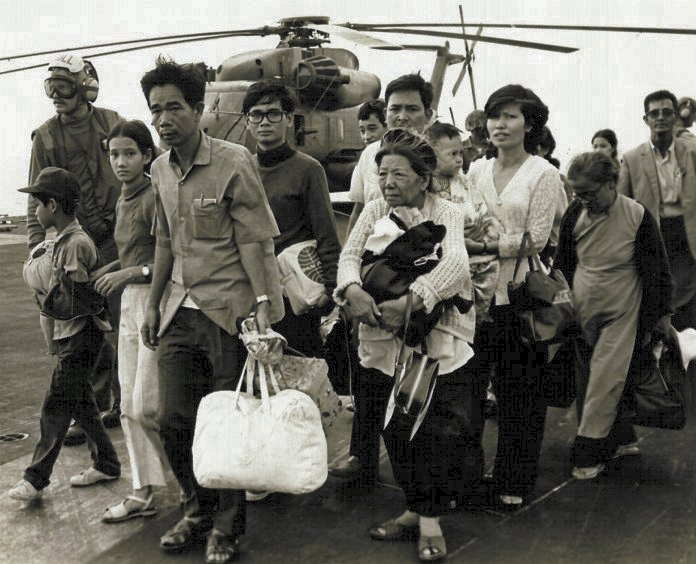
South Vietnamese refugees arrive on a U.S. Navy vessel during Operation Frequent Wind.

As part of the evacuation plan agreed with the DAO, Air America committed 24 of its 28 available helicopters to support the evacuation and 31 pilots agreed to stay in Saigon to support the evacuation; this meant that most helicopters would have only one pilot rather than the usual two. At 08:30 on 29 April, with the shelling of Tan Son Nhut Airport subsiding, Air America began ferrying its helicopter and fixed-wing pilots from their homes in Saigon to the Air America compound at Tan Son Nhut, across the road from the DAO Compound. Air America helicopters started flying to the rooftop LZs in Saigon and either shuttled the evacuees back to the DAO Compound or flew out to the ships of TF76. By 10:30 all of Air America's fixed-wing aircraft had departed Tan Son Nhut, evacuating all non-essential personnel and as many Vietnamese evacuees as they could carry and headed for Thailand. At some point during the morning RVNAF personnel took five ICCS UH-1H Hueys and one Air America Bell 204 from the Air America ramp.

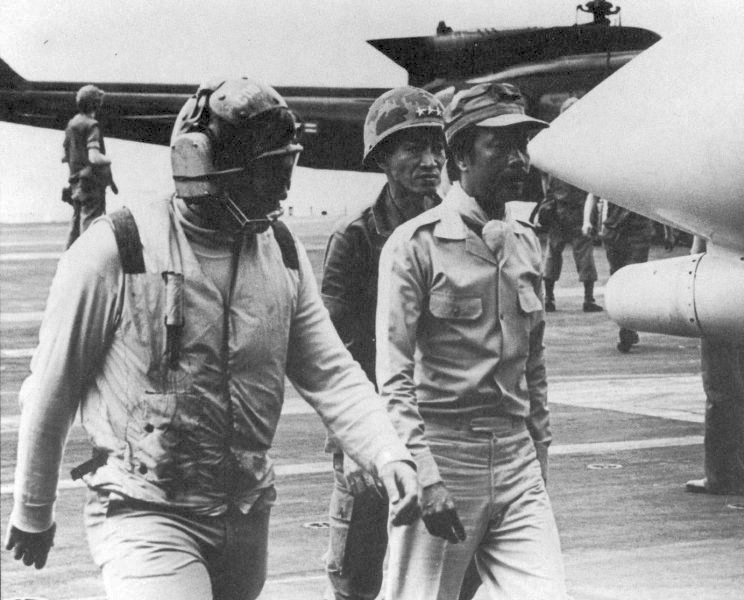
Air Vice Marshal Ky arrives on USS Midway.

At 11:00 the security situation at the Air America compound was deteriorating as General Carey did not wish to risk his Marines by extending his perimeter to cover the Air America compound (LZ 40), so all Air America helicopters from this time operated out of the tennis courts in the DAO Annex (LZ 35). This move created fuel problems for Air America as they no longer had access to the fuel supplies in their compound and at least initially they were refused fuel by the ships of TF76. According to US Naval Archives, at 12:30 an Air America Bell 205 landed Air Vice Marshal Nguyễn Cao Kỳ, Madame Kỳ, Dorothy Martin (wife of Ambassador Martin) and others on USS Denver; however, contemporary reports state and photos show that Marshal Kỳ piloted his own UH-1H Huey to USS Midway.

At approximately 14:30, Air America Bell 205 serial number "N47004" landed on the roof of the Pittman Apartment Building at 22 Gia Long Street to collect a senior Vietnamese intelligence source and his family. The Pittman Building was not an approved LZ, but when the agreed pickup point at the Lee Hotel at 6 Chien Si Circle was declared unusable, CIA station chief Tom Polgar asked Oren B. Harnage, deputy chief of the embassy's Air Branch, to change the pickup to the Pittman Building, which was the home of the assistant station chief and had an elevator shaft believed capable of supporting the weight of a Huey. Harnage boarded an Air America Huey from the embassy's rooftop heliport and flew the short distance to the Pittman Building. Harnage leaned out of the Huey and helped approximately 15 evacuees board the Huey from the narrow helipad. The scene was famously captured on film by Hubert van Es.

Air America helicopters continued to make rooftop pickups until after nightfall by which time navigation became increasingly difficult. Helicopters overflew the designated LZs to check no Americans had been left behind and then the last helicopters (many low on fuel) headed out to TF76, located USS Midway or USS Hancock and shut down. All Air America flights had ceased by 21:00. With its available fleet of only 20 Hueys (3 of which were impounded, ditched or damaged at TF76), Air America had moved over 1,000 evacuees to the DAO Compound, the embassy or out to the ships of TF76.

== The DAO compound ==
At 14:06 two UH-1E Huey helicopters carrying Carey and Colonel Alfred M. Gray Jr. (commander of Regimental Landing Team 4 (RLT4)) landed at the DAO Compound. During their approach to the compound, Carey and Gray got a firsthand view of the PAVN's firepower as they shelled nearby Tan Son Nhut Airport with ground, rocket, and artillery fire. They quickly established an austere command post in preparation for the arrival of the Marine CH-53s and the ground security force.

The first wave of 12 CH-53s from HMH-462 loaded with BLT 2/4's command groups "Alpha" and "Bravo", and Company F and reinforced Company H arrived in the DAO Compound at 15:06 and the marines quickly moved to reinforce the perimeter defenses. As they approached the helicopters had taken rifle and M79 grenade fire from ARVN troops but without causing any apparent damage. The second wave of 12 CH-53s from HMH-463 landed in the DAO Compound at 15:15 bringing in the rest of the BLT. A third wave of two CH-53s from HMH-463 and eight USAF CH-53Cs and two USAF HH-53s of the 40th Aerospace Rescue and Recovery Squadron (all operating from USS Midway) arrived shortly afterwards.

"Alpha" command group, two rifle companies, and the 81 mm mortar platoon were deployed around the DAO headquarters building (the Alamo) and its adjacent landing zones. Companies E and F respectively occupied the northern and southern sections between the DAO headquarters and the DAO Annex. "Bravo" command group, consisting of two rifle companies and the 106 mm recoilless rifle platoon, assumed responsibility for security of the DAO Annex and its adjoining landing zones. Company G occupied the eastern section of the Annex, while Company H assumed control of the western section.

The HMH-462 CH-53s loaded with evacuees and left the compound, they unloaded the first evacuees delivered by Operation Frequent Wind at 15:40. At about 17:30 Carey ordered the extraction of 3rd Platoon, Company C of BLT 1/9, which had been landed at the DAO Compound on 25 April to assist the Marine Security Guard. Between 19:00 and 21:00 Carey transferred 3 platoons (130 men) of BLT 2/4 into the embassy compound to provide additional security and assistance for the embassy.

At 19:30 Carey directed that the remaining elements guarding the Annex be withdrawn to DAO headquarters (the Alamo) where the last of the evacuees would await their flight. Once completed, the new defensive perimeter encompassed only LZ 36 and the Alamo. By 20:30 the last evacuees had been loaded onto helicopters. With the evacuation of the landing control teams from the Annex and Alamo completed, Carey ordered the withdrawal of the ground security forces from the DAO Compound around 22:50. At 23:40 Marines destroyed the satellite terminal, the DAO Compound's last means of direct communication with the outside world. At 00:30 on 30 April, thermite grenades, having been previously placed in selected buildings, ignited as two CH-53s left the DAO parking lot carrying the last elements of BLT 2/4.

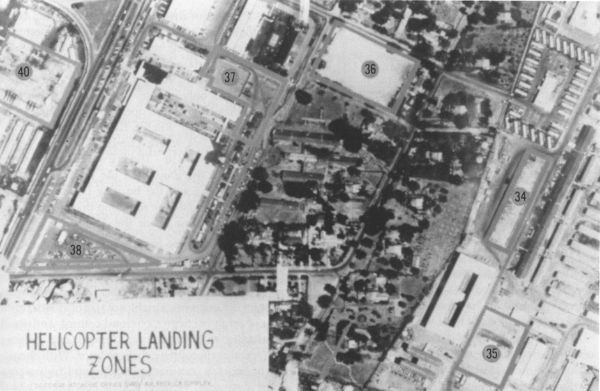
9th MAB intelligence photo of the DAO Compound with LZs marked

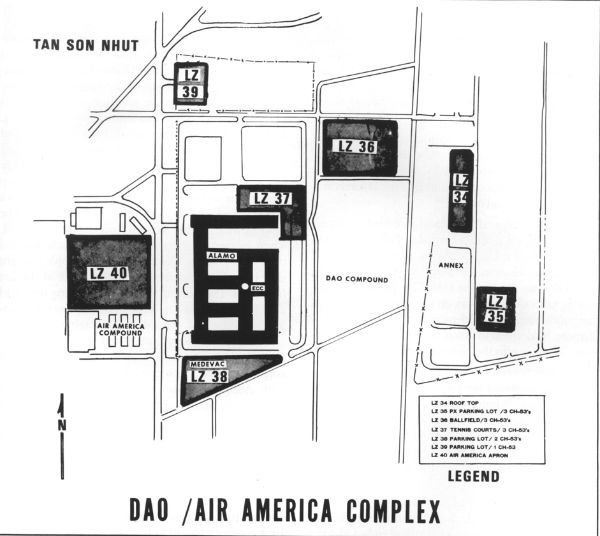
9th MAB post-operation map of the DAO Compound and Air America Compound with LZs marked

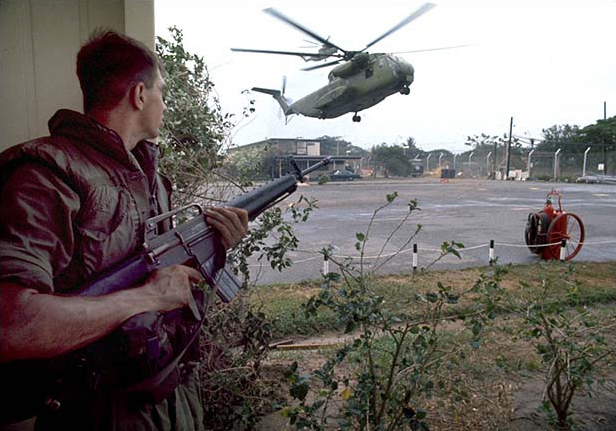
A Marine provides security as helicopters land at the DAO Compound

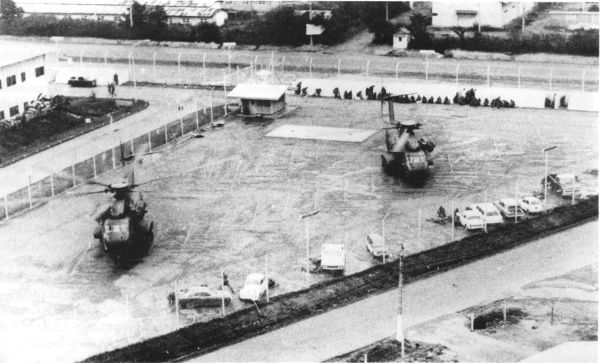
USMC CH-53s at LZ 38

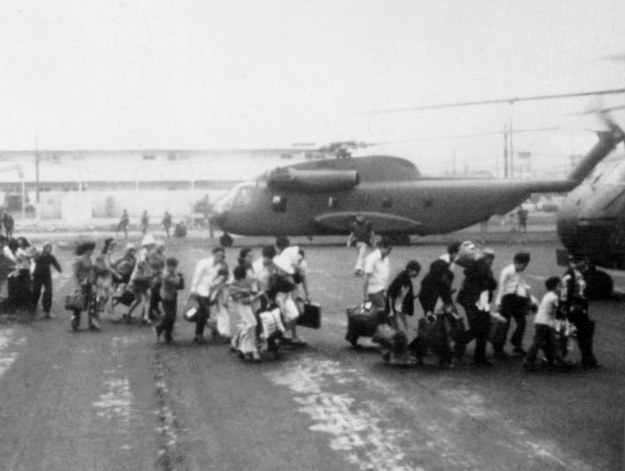
Vietnamese evacuees board a CH-53 at LZ 39

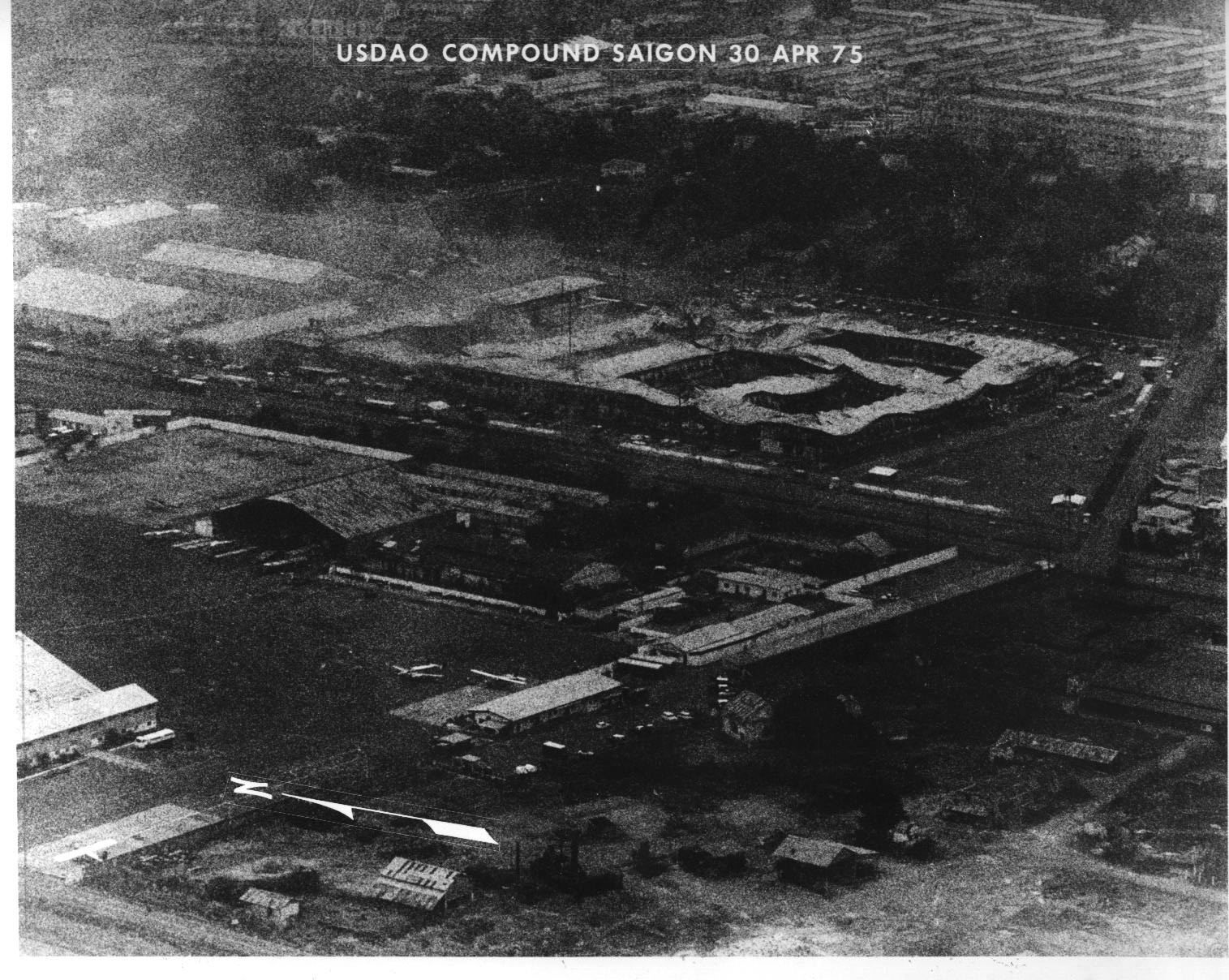
Aerial reconnaissance photos of the destroyed DAO Headquarters building with Air America Compound in the foreground

== The embassy ==
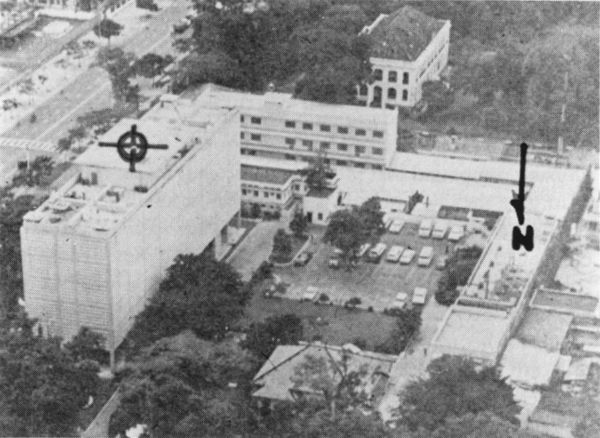
Aerial view of the US Embassy, Saigon, showing chancery building (left), parking lot (center) and Consulate compound and French Embassy (top)

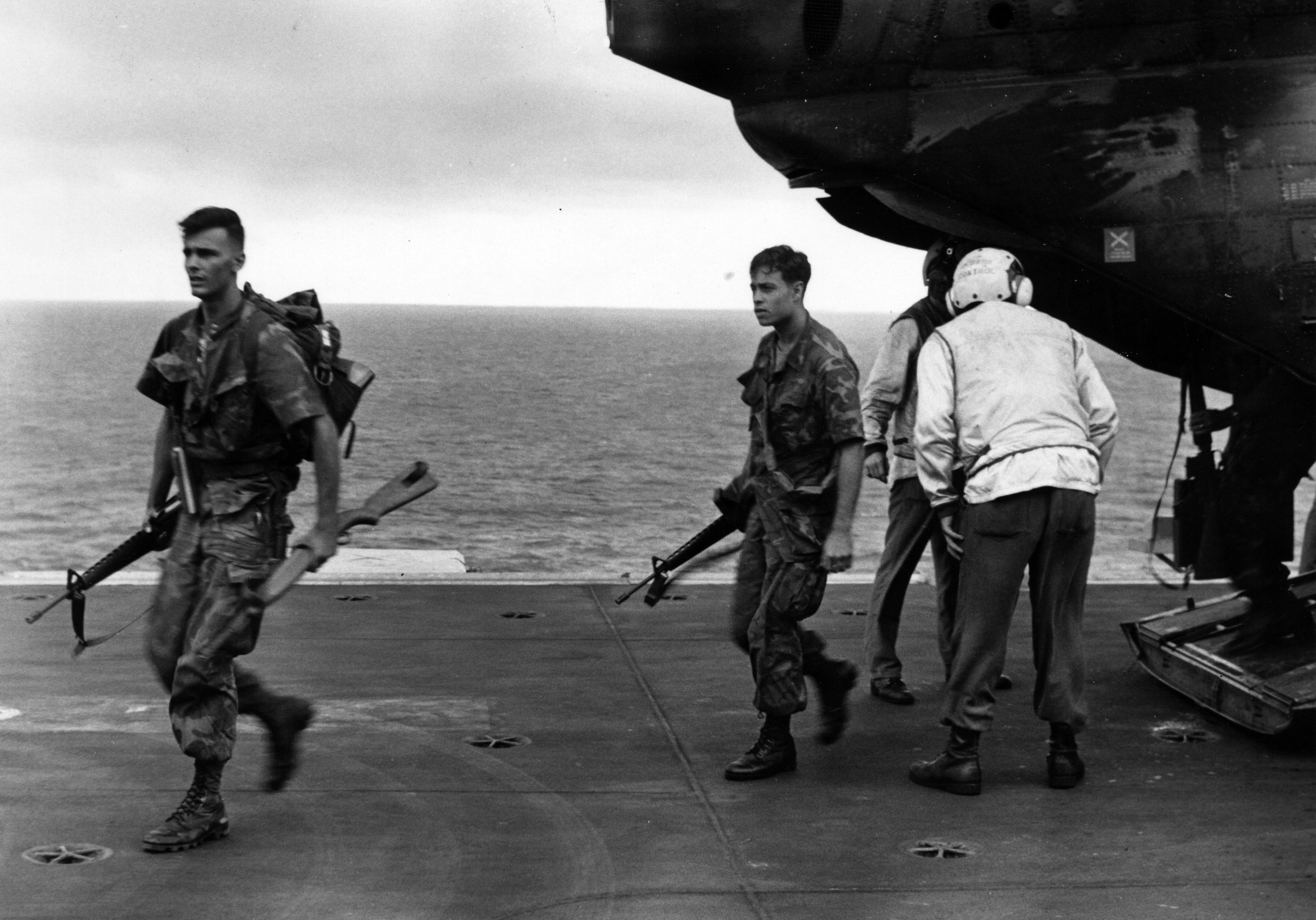
The last members of the Marine Security Guard land on USS Okinawa

On 25 April, 40 Marines from the 9th MAB on USS Hancock were flown in by Air America helicopters in civilian clothes to the DAO compound to augment the 18 Marine Security Guards assigned to defend the embassy; an additional six Marines were assigned to protect Ambassador Martin. Martin had remained optimistic that a negotiated settlement could be reached whereby the US would not have to pull out of South Vietnam and, in an effort to avert defeatism and panic he instructed Major James Kean, commanding officer of the Marine Security Guard Battalion and Ground Support Force Commander United States Embassy Compound, that he could not begin to remove the tamarind tree and other trees and shrubbery which prevented the use of the embassy parking lot as a helicopter landing zone.

By the morning of 29 April, it was estimated that approximately 10,000 people had gathered around the embassy, while some 2,500 evacuees were in the embassy and consular compounds. The crowds prevented the use of buses for transporting evacuees from the embassy to the DAO Compound for evacuation, and the embassy gates were closed to prevent the crowd from surging through. Eligible evacuees now had to make themselves known to the Marine guards or embassy staff manning the walls and were then lifted over the walls and into the embassy compound. Among those arriving at the embassy were Phan Quang Đán, former Deputy Prime Minister and Minister responsible for social welfare and refugee resettlement, and Lieutenant-General Đặng Văn Quang.

From 10:00 to 12:00 Kean and his Marines cut down the tamarind and other trees and moved vehicles to create an LZ in the embassy parking lot behind the chancery building. Two LZs were now available in the embassy compound, the rooftop for UH-1s and CH-46s and the new parking lot LZ for the heavier CH-53s. Air America UH-1s began ferrying evacuees from other smaller assembly points throughout the city and dropping them on the embassy's rooftop LZ. At 15:00 the first CH-53s were sighted heading towards the DAO Compound at Tan Son Nhut. Kean contacted the Seventh Fleet to advise them of his airlift requirements; until that time the fleet believed that all evacuees had been bussed from the embassy to the DAO Compound and that only two helicopters would be required to evacuate Martin and the Marines from the embassy.

Inside the embassy, the evacuees had found whatever space was available inside the embassy compound and evacuees and some staff proceeded to take alcohol from the embassy's stores. From the billowing incinerator on the embassy roof floated intelligence documents and US currency, most charred; some not. An embassy official said that more than five million dollars were being burned.

At 17:00 the first CH-46 landed at the embassy. Between 19:00 and 21:00 on 29 April approximately 130 additional Marines from 2nd Battalion 4th Marines were lifted from the DAO Compound to reinforce perimeter security at the embassy, bringing the total number of Marines at the embassy to 175. The evacuation from the DAO Compound was completed by about 19:00 after which all helicopters would be routed to the embassy; Kean was informed that operations would cease at dark. Kean advised that the LZ would be well lit and had vehicles moved around the parking lot LZ with their engines running and headlights on to illuminate the LZ. At 21:30 a CH-53 pilot informed Kean that Admiral Whitmire, Commander of Task Force 76 had ordered that operations would cease at 23:00. Kean saw Martin to request that he contact the Oval Office to ensure that the airlift continued. Martin soon sent word back to Kean that sorties would continue to be flown. At the same time, General Carey met Admiral Whitmire to convince him to resume flights to the embassy despite pilot fatigue and poor visibility caused by darkness, fires and bad weather.

By 02:15 on 30 April one CH-46 and one CH-53 were landing at the embassy every 10 minutes. At this time, the embassy indicated that another 19 lifts would complete the evacuation. At that time Kean estimated that there were still some 850 non-American evacuees and 225 Americans (including the Marines), and Martin told Kean to do the best he could. At 03:00 Martin ordered Kean to move all the remaining evacuees into the parking lot LZ which was the Marines' final perimeter. At 03:27 President Gerald Ford ordered that no more than 19 additional lifts would be allowed to complete the evacuation. At 04:30 with the 19 lift limit already exceeded, Kean went to the rooftop LZ and spoke over a helicopter radio with Carey who advised that President Ford had ordered that the airlift be limited to US personnel. Kean was then ordered to withdraw his men into the chancery building and withdraw to the rooftop LZ for evacuation.

Kean returned to the ground floor of the chancery and ordered his men to withdraw into a large semicircle at the main entrance to the chancery. Most of the Marines were inside the chancery when the crowds outside the embassy broke through the gates into the compound. The Marines closed and bolted the chancery door, the elevators were locked by Seabees on the sixth floor and the Marines withdrew up the stairwells locking grill gates behind them. On the ground floor a water tanker was driven through the chancery door and the crowd began to surge up through the building toward the rooftop. The Marines on the rooftop had sealed the doors and were using Mace to discourage the crowd from trying to break through. Sporadic gunfire from around the embassy passed over the rooftop.

At 04:58 Martin boarded a USMC CH-46 Sea Knight, call-sign Lady Ace 09 of HMM-165 and was flown to USS Blue Ridge. When Lady Ace 09 transmitted "Tiger is out", those helicopter crews still flying thought the mission was complete, and delayed evacuating the Marines from the embassy rooftop. CH-46s evacuated the Battalion Landing Team by 07:00 and after an anxious wait a lone CH-46 Swift 2-2 of HMM-164 arrived to evacuate Kean and the ten remaining men of the Marine Security Guards, this last helicopter took off at 07:53 on 30 April and landed on USS Okinawa at 08:30.

At 11:30 PAVN tanks smashed through the gates of the Presidential Palace less than 1 km from the embassy and raised the flag of the Viet Cong over the building; the Vietnam War was over.

== Chaos at sea ==
During the course of the operation an unknown number of RVNAF helicopters flew out of what remained of South Vietnam to the fleet. Around 12:00 five or six RVNAF UH-1Hs and one of the stolen ICCS UH-1Hs, were circling around Blue Ridge. The RVNAF pilots had been instructed after dropping off their passengers to ditch their helicopters and they would then be picked up by one of the ship's tenders. The pilot of the stolen ICCS Huey had been told to ditch off the port quarter of the ship, but seemed reluctant to do so, flying around the ship to the starboard bow he jumped from his helicopter at a height of 40 feet (12 m). His helicopter turned and hit the side of Blue Ridge before hitting the sea. The tail rotor sheared off and embedded itself in the engine of an Air America Bell 205 that was doing a hot refueling on the helipad at the rear of the ship. The Air America pilot shut down his helicopter and left it. Moments later a RVNAF UH-1H attempted to land on the helipad, locked rotors with the Air America Bell, almost pushing it overboard. A stolen Air America Bell 204 landed on Kirk, from where US Navy pilots flew it to Okinawa. Some 45 UH-1 Hueys and at least one CH-47 Chinook were pushed overboard to make room for more helicopters to land. Other helicopters dropped off their passengers and were then ditched into the sea by their pilots, close to the ships, their pilots bailing out at the last moment to be picked up by rescue boats. A CH-47 Chinook, too large to land aboard the destroyer escort Kirk, hovered over the fantail as 20 evacuees jumped and one baby dropped into the arms of Navy sailors below. The pilot then moved away from the ship and jumped out himself just before ditching the Chinook in the ocean.

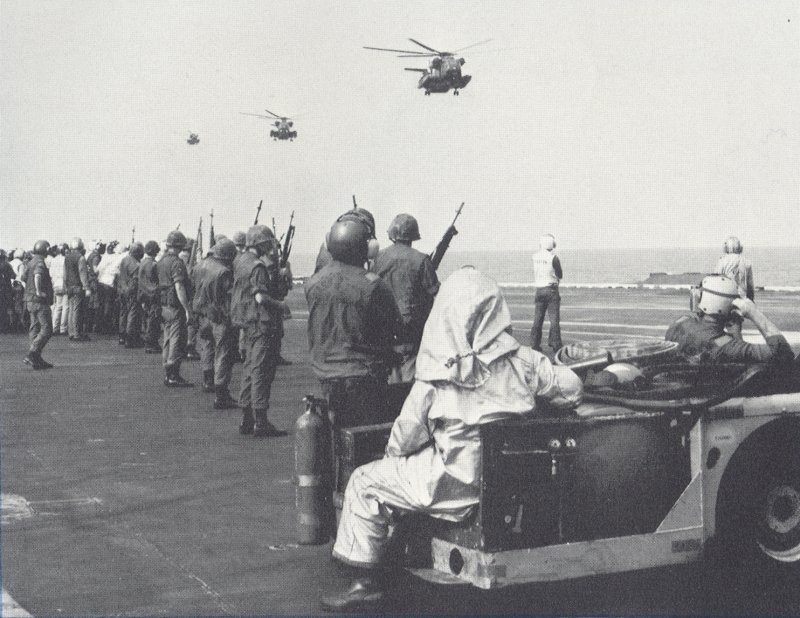
Sea Stallions returning from the DAO Compound approach USS Midway

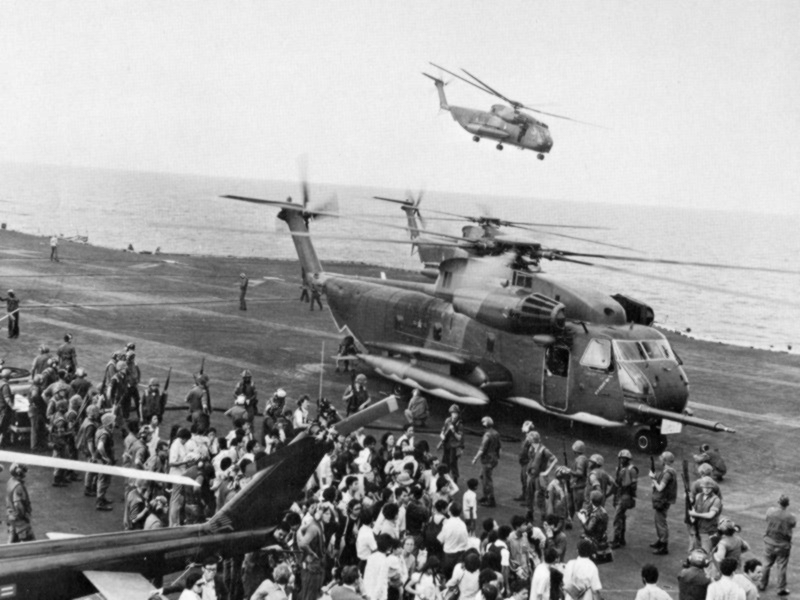
Evacuees offloaded onto USS Midway

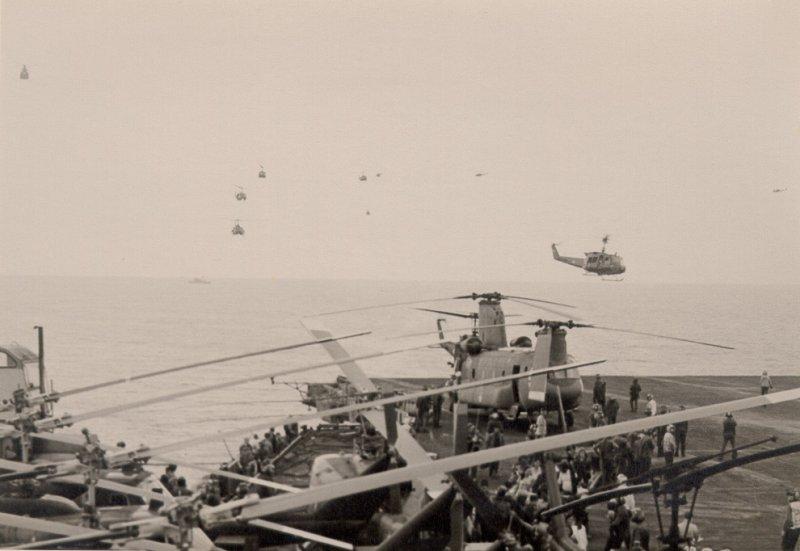
RVNAF Hueys and a CH-47 Chinook arrive at USS Midway

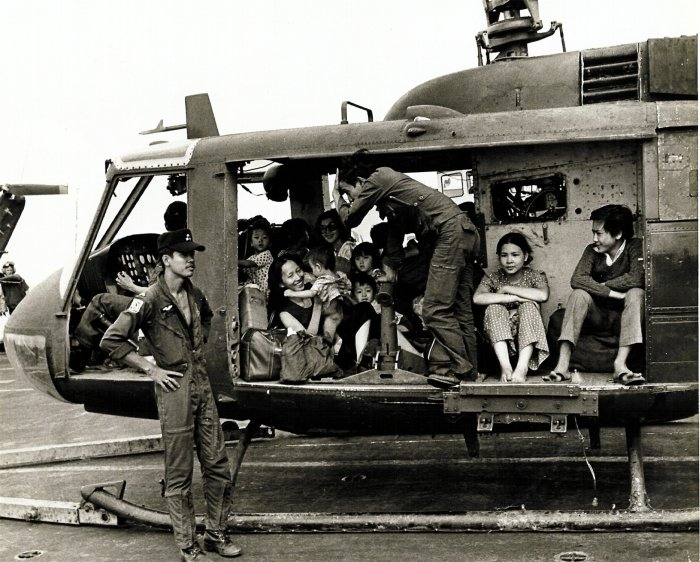
RVNAF Huey full of evacuees on the deck of USS Midway

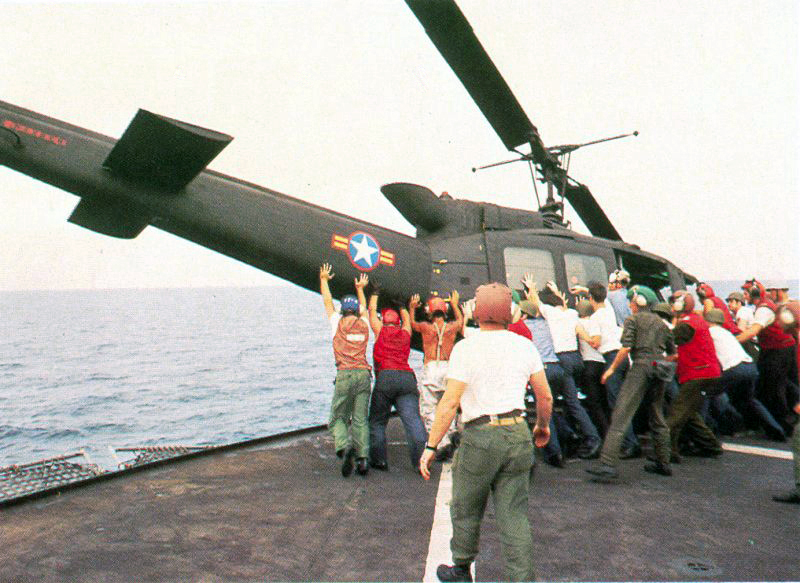
RVNAF Huey is pushed overboard from USS Midway

One of the more notable events occurred on Midway when the pilot of an RVNAF Cessna O-1 dropped a note on the deck of the carrier. The note read "Can you move these helicopter to the other side, I can land on your runway, I can fly 1 hour more, we have enough time to move. Please rescue me. Major Buang, Wife and 5 child." Midway's commanding officer, Captain L.C. Chambers ordered the flight deck crew to clear the landing area; in the process an estimated US$10 million worth of UH-1 Huey helicopters were pushed overboard into the South China Sea. Once the deck was clear Major Buang approached the deck, bounced once and then touched down and taxied to a halt with room to spare. Major Buang became the first RVNAF fixed-wing pilot to ever land on a carrier. A second Cessna O-1 was also recovered by USS Midway that afternoon.

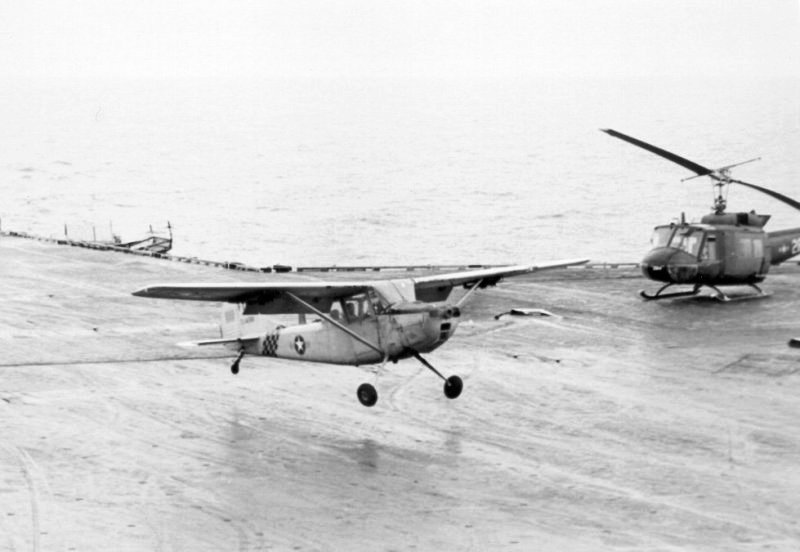
Major Buang on final approach

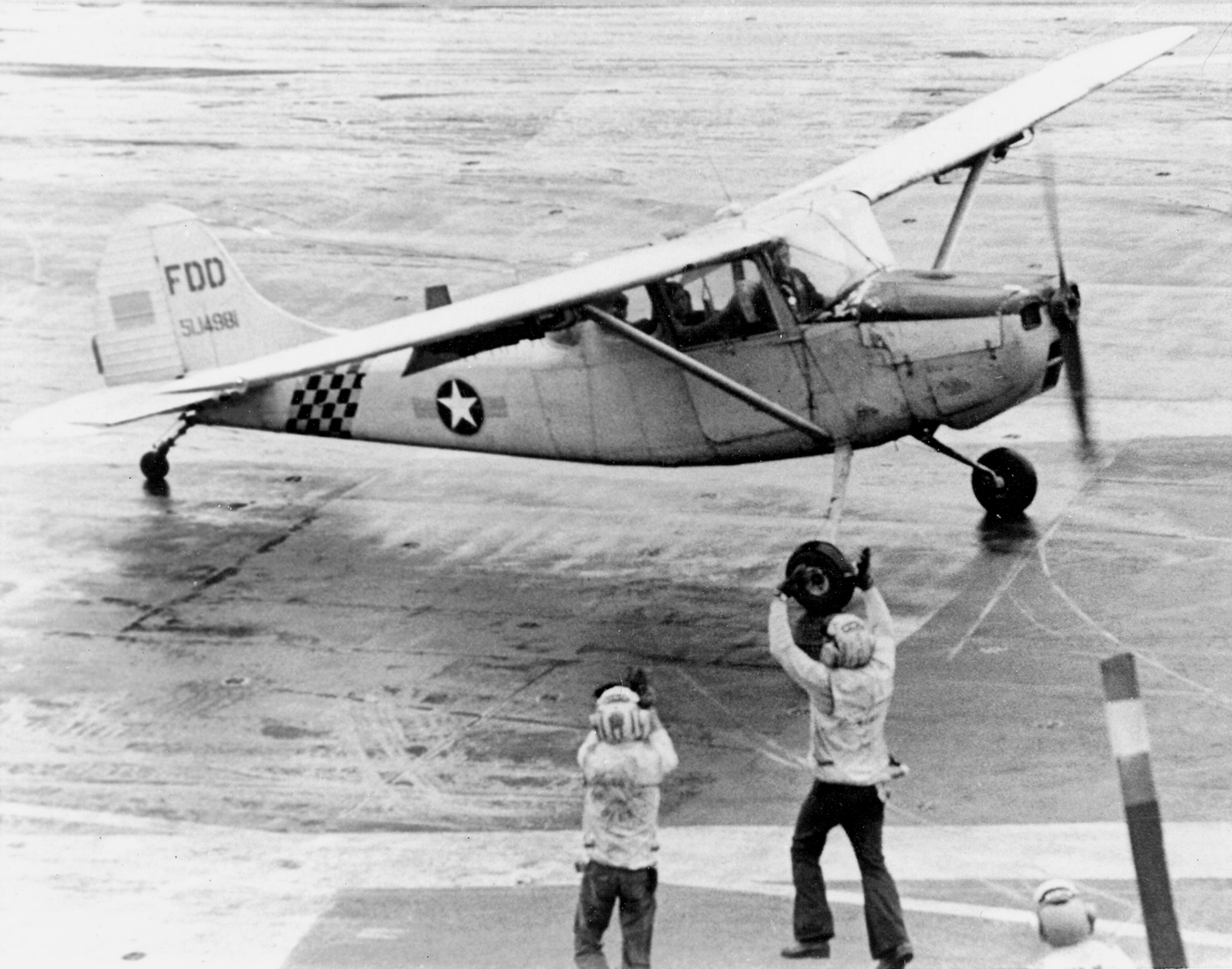
Major Buang taxies to a halt

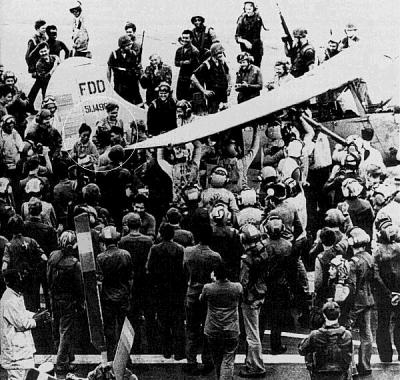
Midway deck crew surround Major Buang and his family

At the same time as the aerial evacuation, tens of thousands of South Vietnamese fled towards TF-76 aboard junks, sampans, and small craft. MSC tugs pulled barges filled with people from Saigon Port out to TF-76. A flotilla of Republic of Vietnam Navy (RVNN) and other vessels organised by Captain Kiem Do, then RVNN Deputy Chief of Staff, with the assistance of U.S. liaison officer Richard Armitage, concentrated off Con Son Island southwest of Vũng Tàu with 30,000 sailors, their families, and other civilians on board. On the afternoon of 30 April, TF-76 moved away from the coast, picking up more refugees as they went.

USS Kirk and USS Cook split off from the main Task Force to rendezvous with the RVNN ships at Con Son and help prepare vessels for the voyage to the Philippines, moving passengers from barely floating boats onto bigger vessels and scuttling the rest. The flotilla formed a five mile long convoy travelling the speed of the slowest boat, 5 knots. The RVNN ships included:

- RVNS Tran Hung Dao (former USS Camp (DE-251))
- RVNS Trần Quang Khải (former USS Bering Strait (AVP-34)/USCGC Bering Strait (WHEC-382))
- RVNS Trần Nhật Duật (former USS Yakutat (AVP-32)/USCGC Yakutat (WHEC-380))
- RVNS Trần Bình Trọng (former USS Castle Rock (AVP-35)/USCGC Castle Rock (WHEC-383))
- RVNS Trần Quốc Toản (former USS Cook Inlet (AVP-36)/USCGC Cook Inlet (WHEC-384))
- RVNS Đống Đa II (former USS Crestview PCE-895)
- RVNS Chi Lang II (former USS Gayety AM-239)
- RVNS Chi Linh (former USS Shelter (AM-301))
- RVNS Ngọc Hồi (former USS Brattleboro PCE(R)-852)
- RVNS Vạn Kiếp II (former USS Amherst PCE(R)-853)
- RVNS Lý Thường Kiệt (former USS USS Chincoteague (AVP-24)/USCGC Chincoteague (WHEC-375))
- RVNS Ngô Quyền (former USS Wachapreague (AGP-8)/USCGC McCulloch (WHEC-386))
- RVNS Huong Giang (former USS Oceanside (LSM-175))
- RVNS Cam Ranh (former USS Marion County (LST-975))
- RVNS Thi Nai (former USS Cayuga County (LST-529))
- RVNS Nha Trang (former USS Jerome County (LST-848))
- RVNS Huỳnh Văn Đức (former USCGC Point Clear (WPB-82315))
- RVNS My Tho (former Harnett County (LST-821))
- RVNS Can Tho (former USS Garrett County (LST-786))
- RVNS Vinh Long (former USS Satyr (ARL-23))

By the time they reached the Philippines, the Filipino government had recognized the legitimacy of the North Vietnamese government and the ships were technically North Vietnamese property. Kirk and Cook sent two U.S. sailors to each of the 32 RVNN ships to officially take command of the ships as they entered Philippine territorial waters, effectively repatriating the ships back into the U.S. Navy. Many of the ships would eventually be turned over to the Philippine Navy.

On 2 May, Task Force 76, carrying the Operation Frequent Wind evacuees and 44,000 seaborne evacuees and the RVNN group set sail for reception centers in the Philippines and Guam.

== Results of the evacuation ==
During the fixed-wing evacuation 50,493 people (including 2,678 Vietnamese orphans) were evacuated from Tan Son Nhut. Marine pilots accumulated 1,054 flight hours and flew 682 sorties throughout Operation Frequent Wind. The evacuation of personnel from the DAO compound had lasted nine hours and involved over 50 Marine Corps and Air Force helicopters. In the helicopter evacuation a total of 395 Americans and 4,475 Vietnamese and third-country nationals were evacuated from the DAO compound and a further 978 U.S. and 1,120 Vietnamese and third-country nationals from the embassy, giving a total of 1,373 Americans and 5,595 Vietnamese and third country nationals. In addition, Air America helicopters and RVNAF aircraft brought additional evacuees to the TF76 ships. Many of the Vietnamese evacuees were allowed to enter the United States under the Indochina Migration and Refugee Assistance Act.

Some 400 evacuees were left behind at the embassy including over 100 South Korean citizens; among them was Brigadier General Lee Dae-yong, the intelligence chief at the South Korean Embassy in Saigon. The South Korean civilians were evacuated in 1976, while General Lee and two other diplomats were held captive until April 1980. Forty-nine Americans, including dependents, were also left behind or chose to remain in Saigon. They were evacuated to Bangkok on 1 August 1976.

While the operation itself was a success, the images of the evacuation symbolized the wastefulness and ultimate futility of American involvement in Vietnam. President Ford later called it "a sad and tragic period in America's history" but argued that "you couldn't help but be very proud of those pilots and others who were conducting the evacuation". Nixon's pledge of Peace with Honour in Vietnam had become a humiliating defeat, which together with Watergate contributed to the crisis of confidence that affected America throughout the 1970s.

== Casualties ==
For an operation of the size and complexity of Frequent Wind, casualties were relatively light. Marine corporals Charles McMahon and Darwin Judge, killed at the DAO compound, were the only members of US forces killed in action during the operation and they were the last US ground casualties in Vietnam. A Marine AH-1J SeaCobra ran out of fuel while searching for USS Okinawa and ditched at sea; the two crew members were rescued by a boat from USS Kirk. CH-46F Swift 1–4 of HMM-164 from USS Hancock flown by Captain William C. Nystul and First Lieutenant Michael J. Shea crashed into the sea on its approach to the ship after having flown a night sea and air rescue mission. The two enlisted crewmen survived, but the bodies of the pilots were not recovered. The cause of the crash was never determined.

Three refugees are known to have died during the evacuation.

== Memorials ==
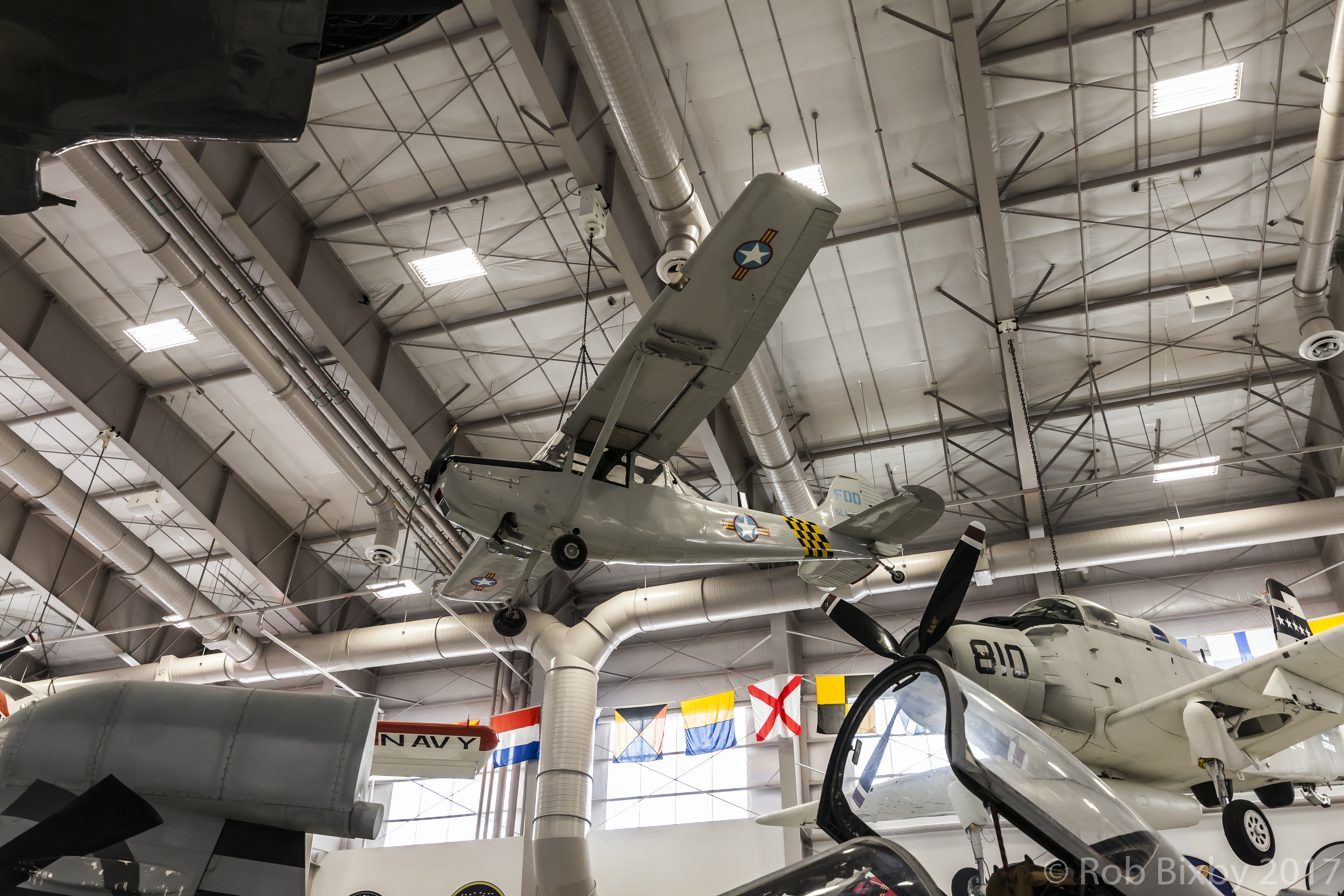
Major Buang's Cessna O-1, on display at the National Museum of Naval Aviation, Pensacola, FL

During the demolition of the embassy, the metal staircase leading from the rooftop to the helipad was removed and sent back to the United States, where it is now on display at the Gerald R. Ford Presidential Museum.

The Cessna O-1 Bird Dog that Major Buang landed on USS Midway is now on display at the National Museum of Naval Aviation at Naval Air Station Pensacola, Florida. The USS Midway is a museum ship in San Diego. Lady Ace 09, CH-46 serial number 154803, is now on display at the Flying Leatherneck Aviation Museum in San Diego, California.

== In popular culture ==
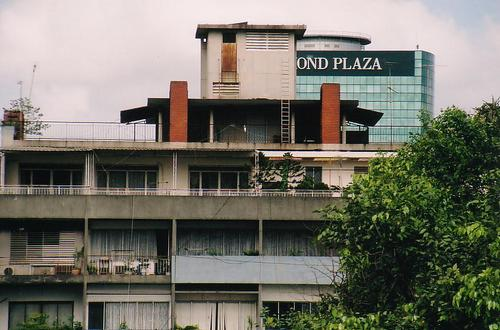
Rooftop of 22 Gia Long Street in 2002

On the afternoon of 29 April 1975, Hubert van Es, a Saigon-based photographer for United Press International, took the iconic photo of Operation Frequent Wind of an Air America UH-1 on a rooftop picking up Vietnamese evacuees. The building in the photo was the Pittman Apartment building at 22 Gia Long Street (now 22 Lý Tự Trọng Street), which was used as a residence by various embassy, CIA, and USAID employees. It has often been misidentified as the US Embassy. Hubert van Es' photo is frequently used in political cartoons commenting on US foreign policy.

The second act of the stage musical Miss Saigon depicts events leading up to, and during Operation Frequent Wind, with the main protagonists (Chris and Kim) becoming separated as a result of the evacuation. Writer Claude-Michel Schönberg has acknowledged that the musical was inspired by pictures of the evacuation. Hugh van Es believed that Miss Saigon misappropriated his photo and considered legal action against the show but decided against it.

In The Simpsons at the end of Episode 16 of Season 6, "Bart vs. Australia", the Simpsons are evacuated from the American Embassy as angry Australians gather outside in a scene reminiscent of Hubert van Es's famous photo. Homer asks the helicopter pilot if they are being taken to an aircraft carrier and is told that "the closest vessel is the USS Walter Mondale. It's a laundry ship".

In the Hey Arnold! episode "Arnold's Christmas", Mr. Hyunh recounts having surrendered his daughter, Mai, to American soldiers during Operation Frequent Wind. He would not escape Vietnam for another 20 years, and he moves to Hillwood because one of the soldiers had yelled out the name of the location she would be taken to. Mr. Hyunh's voice actor, Baoan Coleman – himself a Vietnamese who was evacuated to the US during the operation – was a script advisor on this episode.

The 2007 PBS documentary Oh, Saigon by DAO Compound evacuee, film director Doan Hoang, tells the story of her family's escape and resettlement.

In 2010, under the direction of VADM Adam Robinson, then Surgeon General of the U.S. Navy, the Navy Medical Education and Training Command created a documentary entitled The Lucky Few: The Story of USS Kirk, Providing Humanitarian & Medical Care at Sea. It has since been translated into Vietnamese.

The operation was the subject of the 2014 PBS documentary Last Days in Vietnam.

== See also ==
- 2021 Kabul airlift
- Mayaguez incident
- Operation Babylift
- Operation Eagle Pull
- Operation New Life
