= Defense Attaché Office, Saigon (1973–1975) =

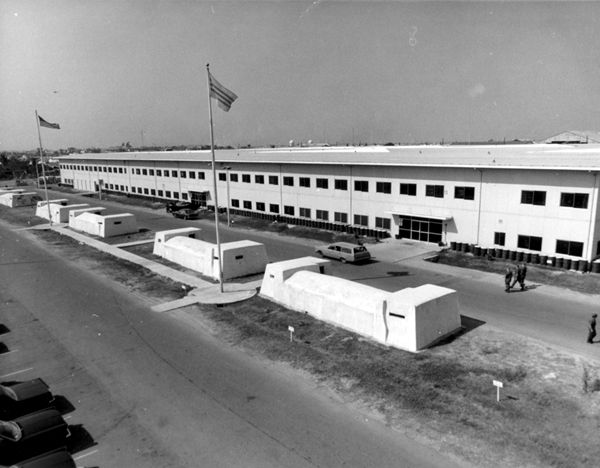
- DAO Compound at Tan Son Nhut
- Active: 1973–75
- Country: United States
- Part of: United States Support Activities Group; Embassy of the United States, Saigon
- Garrison/HQ: Tan Son Nhut Airport, South Vietnam
- Nickname: DAO

Commanders
- Notable commanders: John E. Murray; Homer D. Smith

The Defense Attaché Office, Saigon (also known as DAO, Saigon or simply DAO) was a joint-service command and military attaché branch of the United States Department of Defense (DOD) under the control of United States Support Activities Group (USSAG). It assumed all DOD responsibilities in South Vietnam following the disestablishment of Military Assistance Command, Vietnam (MACV) in March 1973. The DAO was responsible for administering military assistance and support to the South Vietnamese armed forces, the gathering and distribution of military intelligence and the performance of normal Defense Attaché functions. The DAO remained in existence until August 1975.

== Background and structure ==
Under the terms of the Paris Peace Accords MACV and all American and third country forces had to be withdrawn from South Vietnam within 60 days of the ceasefire. A small U.S. military headquarters was needed to continue the military assistance program for the South Vietnamese military and supervise the technical assistance still required to complete the goals of Vietnamization and also to report operational and military intelligence through military channels to DOD authorities. This headquarters was to become the Defense Attache Office, Saigon. In addition a multi-service organization was required to plan for the application of U.S. air and naval power into North or South Vietnam, Cambodia or Laos, should this be required and ordered. Called the United States Support Activities Group & 7th Air Force (USSAG/7th AF), it was to be located at Nakhon Phanom Royal Thai Air Force Base in northeast Thailand.

The advance echelon of USSAG/7AF moved from Tan Son Nhut Air Base to Nakhon Phanom on 29 January 1973. Transfer of the main body, drawn largely from the operations and intelligence sections of MACV and Seventh Air Force, began on 10 February. USSAG was activated on 11 February 1973 under the command of commander of MACV, but at 08:00 on 15 February, USAF General John W. Vogt Jr., as USSAG/7AF commander, took over from MACV control of American air operations. U.S. air support operations into Cambodia continued under USSAG/7th AF until August 1973.

The DAO was established as a subsidiary command of MACV and was activated on 28 January 1973 with United States Army Major General John E. Murray, the former MACV Director of Logistics as the Defense Attaché and United States Air Force Brigadier General Ralph J. Maglione, formerly the MACV J-1 (Director for Manpower and Personnel), as deputy Defense Attaché. The DAO remained under the command of commander of MACV until the deactivation of MACV on 27 March at which time command passed to the Commander USSAG/7th AF at Nakhon Phanom.

The Defense Attaché was assisted by an attaché element consisting of Service attachés and assistant Service attachés who performed traditional Defense Attaché functions. The attaché element was under the supervision of the Defense Attaché and the United States Ambassador to South Vietnam to the extent provided by law and in accordance with Executive orders and such other instructions as the President of the United States might promulgate. The Defense Attaché was also responsible to the Director of the Defense Intelligence Agency (DIA) for all military and political-military intelligence functions. The Defense Attaché and his assistant had direct access to the Ambassador on all attaché matters and were to keep the Ambassador fully informed. Unresolved differences between the Ambassador and the Defense Attaché concerning attaché matters were to be referred by the Defense Attaché to the Director of the DIA. Under CINCPAC's responsibility, however, were the Defense Attaché's military assistance functions. The Defense Attaché was the representative of the United States Secretary of Defense (and CINCPAC) with respect to the U.S. security assistance program in South Vietnam and coordinated with the Service divisions in their planning and management of the respective Military Assistance Service Funded (MASF) programs in support of the South Vietnamese military. The Defense Attaché was CINCPAC's single senior military representative in South Vietnam.

The DAO occupied the offices turned over to it by MACV adjacent to Tan Son Nhut Airport, and most of its employees and officials conducted their work from those offices. Small field offices were located in Da Nang, Pleiku, Qui Nhon, Nha Trang, Bien Hoa, Long Binh, Nha Be, Đồng Tâm, Binh Thuy and Can Tho.

The DAO was organized into 6 main divisions: Army, Navy, Air Force, communications-electronics, operations and plans and support. The service divisions corresponded to their predecessor elements in MACV, except for the advisory role, their basic missions being to support the self-sufficiency of the South Vietnamese military.

To perform the traditional representational and information-collecting functions of military attaches, five professional attaches – two Army, two Air Force and one Navy – were assigned to the DAO with offices in the Embassy of the United States, Saigon. The senior member of this group was the assistant Defense Attaché, an Army colonel who reported to the DIA in Washington through attaché channels. The attachés made frequent visits to the field where they observed South Vietnamese units and activities and reported those observations to the defense attaché and to Washington.

The deputy Defense Attaché was also chief of the Operations and Plans Division, DAO. In addition to having a small plans branch to perform customary military planning functions, Operations and Plans Division had an operations branch that manned the Operations Center and conducted liaison with the South Vietnamese Joint General Staff (JGS) and with Headquarters, USSAG, on operational and reporting matters. The training section of the Operations Branch was responsible for training provided to the South Vietnamese military under the Military Assistance Program. The largest element in the Operations and Plans Division was the Intelligence Branch. The Chief of the Intelligence Branch was responsible for American military intelligence activities in South Vietnam. He reported directly to the Ambassador and the Defense Attaché, coordinated with South Vietnamese intelligence agencies and other U.S. intelligence activities in South Vietnam, and, in intelligence channels, reported simultaneously on most matters to USSAG, CINCPAC and the DIA. Because DAO Saigon was subordinate to USSAG in operational and intelligence fields, the normal flow of tasking and reporting was through USSAG to CINCPAC and the Joint Chiefs of Staff in Washington. The Communications and Electronics Division had functions which, like those of the Operations and Plans Division, included support of U.S. military activities as well as continued military assistance to the South Vietnamese military. The Communications and Electronics Division supervised a contract which provided communications for DAO, the US Embassy, and other U.S. agencies. The division also gave technical support, through contractors, to South Vietnamese military communications systems. It also provided liaison and assistance to the JGS and the Army of the Republic of Vietnam (ARVN) Signal Department.

Three divisions within DAO managed the complex military assistance programs for the ARVN, the Republic of Vietnam Air Force (RVNAF) and the Republic of Vietnam Navy: the Army, Air Force and Navy Divisions.

Despite its broad responsibilities, DAO was authorized only 50 military staff and 1,200 civilian DOD employees. It was also told to plan for an early reduction in strength and disestablishment, the latter expected to occur within a year. To accomplish its mission while planning on phasing out, DAO had to employ contractors to perform many functions. The contracts, however, were also to be reduced in number and scope throughout the year. When DAO Saigon became operational in late January 1973, no fewer than 383 separate contracts were on the books with a total value of US$255 million. Slightly fewer than 250 of these were performed in South Vietnam; the others were offshore. In January 1973, over 23,000 people were employed by contractors in South Vietnam, of whom over 5,000) were Americans, 16,000 were Vietnamese, and the remainder were third-country nationals. By mid-year of 1973 the total was reduced by half. More than half the American contract employees were involved in training programs for the South Vietnamese military. Of these, more than half were involved in aircraft maintenance, another large group was in communications and electronics, and the rest worked in technical fields ranging from vehicle repair and overhaul to ship overhaul and maintenance. Although most contract employees were located in the Saigon region, sizable groups were at the air bases at Da Nang, Pleiku, Phù Cát, Phan Rang and at Binh Thuy.

The ceasefire agreement in Vietnam signalled the end of the American advisory effort in that country. The senior officials of DAO scrupulously avoided any offer of operational advice to the Vietnamese with whom they worked intimately and continuously. The technical assistance provided by the military and senior civilian officials of DAO and by the contractors was essential to the South Vietnamese military's modernization and expansion, but the South Vietnamese military would get no advice on military operations, tactics, or techniques of employment.

== History ==
=== 1973 ===
In 1973, relying on information supplied by the JGS, DAO Saigon began reporting statistical and descriptive information on ceasefire violations. At the end of July 1973, the Intelligence Branch of DAO noted that construction on the People's Army of Vietnam (PAVN)'s new logistical corridor inside South Vietnam, Route 14, was continuing, that the pipeline was being extended, and that ammunition shipments into South Vietnam were at a high level, but these preparations notwithstanding, no new offensive was seen in the offing. DAO and USSAG planners cooperated with ARVN I Corps in keeping target folders current, and direct liaison between I Corps and USSAG was established for this purpose.

In early October 1973, the DAO suggested that North Vietnam had three courses of action from which it would select the one most likely to provide the earliest achievement of its national goal, the conquest of South Vietnam. The first was political: creating a recognized government within South Vietnam capable of competing in the economic and political struggle. The second a limited military offensive designed to create a military, economic and political situation beyond the capability of South Vietnam to handle. The third a major military offensive to cause the immediate collapse of South Vietnam's government and armed forces. The DAO postulated that North Vietnam would base its decision for 1974 primarily on expectations of Soviet and Chinese military and economic support and on an assessment of the probable U.S. reaction to an escalation of the war. The DAO concluded that North Vietnam was not yet ready for a major, decisive offensive despite heavy infiltration of replacements, some PAVN units in the South were still too far understrength, but that as the failures of the political struggle became more evident, the PAVN would embark on a phased offensive to create gradually conditions beyond the capacity of South Vietnam to cope with. While pursuing this military course of action North Vietnam would continue political and economic actions to support it and proceed with the development of the military strength required for a decisive offensive.

On 4 December 1973 the DAO submitted to DOD its projected military assistance requirements for Fiscal years (FY) 1976 to 1980, requiring approximately US$1.2 billion each year based on a South Vietnamese force structure of 1.2 million men and RVNAF strength of 66 squadrons capable of generating 12,000 combat sorties per month. Included in these estimates were the one-for-one replacement of destroyed or obsolete equipment as permitted by the Paris Peace Accords, including the replacement of M41 tanks with M48s and F-5As with F-5Es.

In late December 1973, fearing that ARVN forces in I Corps could be trapped if the PAVN interdicted Route 1 north of the Hải Vân Pass and face "Dunkirk without ships", Murray requested an additional six Landing Ship, Tank (LST)s to supplement the nine already in the Vietnamese Navy and for the dredging of the channel from Thuận An to Tân Mỹ Base to allow LST access. Pentagon lawyers refused the request for additional LSTs as a possible breach of the restrictions agreed in the Paris Peace Accords.

=== 1974 ===
In January 1974 Murray met General Cao Văn Viên, chairman of the JGS to emphasise the need to conserve ammunition. Following this meeting Viên met with his head of logistics General Dong Van Khuyen and they agreed to cut ammunition and fuel supplies for all units.

On the anniversary of the ceasefire in January 1974, the DAO assessed that although there existed a rough parity of military power deployed in South Vietnam, considering the obviously heavier requirements on South Vietnam to protect a dispersed population and long lines of communication, the ARVN could retain not even one division in general reserve. The planned defense possessed no flexibility whatsoever, and adjustments were possible only by giving up terrain and usually population along with it. On the other hand, the PAVN not only possessed considerable flexibility in choosing objectives and selecting forces to employ, but it also had six full-strength infantry divisions, adequately supported by artillery, tanks and supplies, to throw into the battle at the decisive moment. Furthermore, improvements made in roads southward and the absence of U.S. air interdiction reduced PAVN deployment times to the point where a surprise appearance of the PAVN reserve became a worrisome possibility.

U.S. military assistance to South Vietnam was "service funded." This meant that, unlike other programs funded by the United States Congress in a military assistance appropriations act, the money for support of the South Vietnamese military was contained in the Army, Navy and Air Force sections of the DOD appropriations bill. A carryover from the days of active U.S. military participation in the war, the Military Assistance Service Funded (MASF) program for South Vietnam became obsolete with the departure of U.S. forces from Indochina in January 1973. But months passed before the DOD, the Services and Congress could adjust to the changed situation with a new military assistance program. In the interim, DAO Saigon requisitioned supplies and equipment for the South Vietnamese military under continuing Congressional resolution authority, based on the program of assistance developed jointly with South Vietnam's Defense Ministry and JGS in early 1973 and in anticipation of adequate funds in the Defense Appropriation Act for FY 1974.

In April 1974 with ongoing combat between the PAVN and South Vietnamese forces, DAO calculated that even including ammunition in transit, only 121,000 short tons of ammunition would be available to South Vietnamese forces by the end of that month. With only US $301 million allocated for ammunition purchase in FY 74, it would be impossible to regain the ceasefire ammunition posture. That amount of ammunition could be used in less than three months of intensive combat and would disappear in nine months even at the austere rates imposed by the JGS.

The FY 74 allocation for petroleum, oil and lubricants (POL) for the South Vietnamese military was dramatically impacted by the 1973 oil crisis, the original allocation of US$47 million for POL was increased by 147 percent to US$116 million. The FY 75 POL allocation was projected to be US$154 million, but when the US defense allocation was reduced this amount was reduced to US$60 million with the result that POL supply to the South Vietnamese military was reduced by 50 percent.

On 1 June Murray sent a cable to the Pentagon criticising reductions in military aid saying that "you can roughly equate cuts in support to loss of real estate" and that as aid decreased South Vietnam would be forced to retreat to a rump state based on Saigon and the Mekong Delta. Murray advised that South Vietnam needed a minimum aid level of US$1.126 billion, but even this would not replace lost and damaged equipment, with aid of US$900 million military capacity would decline after mid-1975, with aid at US$750 million South Vietnam would be unable to stop a major attack, while at US$600 million the US should "write off South Vietnam as a bad investment and broken promise." Murray had briefed South Vietnamese President Nguyễn Văn Thiệu on the impact of aid cuts, but because he was restricted from providing military advice, he could not formally advise him to abandon land to reduce the burden on the overstretched military. Thiệu however believed that the Nixon administration would be able to convince Congress to restore the funding and no land would need to be abandoned. Murray's briefing papers on the deteriorating aid situation were provided to Viên and leaked to the North Vietnamese by a spy in Viên's office.

On 11 June 1974, the United States Senate passed the FY 75 Military Procurement Bill with a US$900 million limit on Vietnam MASF. In a Senate-House conference the limit was raised to US $1 billion, and a bill including that amount was signed by President Gerald Ford on 5 August, but it soon became apparent that the appropriation for South Vietnam would be much less. On 23 and 24 September, the House and Senate appropriated only US$700 million for Vietnam in the Defense Appropriation Bill for FY 75. The US $700 million appropriation, covered all shipping expenses, certain undelivered FY 73-74 items and commitments, as well as the operational costs or the DAO itself, leaving less than US$500 million to be applied to the operational requirements of the South Vietnamese military. The DAO calculated that at this funding level by 30 June 1975 the South Vietnamese military would have only a 30 day supply of ammunition and almost no fuel. General Murray advised the Pentagon that "the ARVN is compelled to trade off blood for ammo, that the casualties are going up as the ammo allocations go down."

In August 1974 the DAO recommended a substantial reduction in RVNAF training in the United States in order to save costs. 318 crew in training would return to Vietnam between August and December 1974, while 347 crew would stay to complete their training.

His term of assignment completed, and facing retirement, Murray left Saigon in August 1974. In a debriefing meeting with CINCPAC Admiral Noel Gayler in Hawaii, Murray warned of the devastating impact of the aid cuts and President Thiệu's misplaced confidence that aid would be restored. Murray warned that "without proper support, the [South Vietnamese] are going to lose, maybe not next week, or next month, but after the year they are going to."

Deputy Commander of USSAG, MG Ira A. Hunt Jr. came over to Saigon to fill in as Defense Attache until the newly appointed MG Homer D. Smith could arrive. Hunt continued the conferences and working sessions between DAO and JGS staffs to revise the MASF program within the US$700 million appropriation. The ARVN would get about US$410 million, half of what it needed. Army ammunition requirements alone, originally estimated at US$400 million, would be US$500 million at 1974 prices. The RVNAF would receive about US$160 million, less than 30 percent of its requirement, while the Navy would have to make do with about US$9 million. Draconian measures were applied. Viên restricted ARVN operations in each Corps to one 10-day operation per month. Only 55 percent of available transportation could be fueled, and tactical movement required the approval of the Corps' commander. Bandages and surgical dressings were washed and reused, as were other disposable surgical supplies such as hypodermic syringes and needles, intravenous sets, and rubber gloves. Ammunition issues were even more rigidly controlled than before. In the RVNAF, squadrons were reduced from 66 to 56; no replacements were ordered for 162 destroyed aircraft; flying hours, contractor support, and supply levels were further reduced; and 224 aircraft were placed in storage, among them all 61 remaining A-1 Skyraider fighter-bombers, all 52 C-7 Caribou cargo airplanes, 34 AC-47 Spooky and AC-119 gunships, all 31 O-2 observation planes and 31 UH-1 Huey helicopters. Among other operational reductions, the Navy inactivated 21 of its 44 riverine units, reducing security in the Mekong Delta. This was hardly the posture for an armed force on the eve of its final battle for survival. By November 1974 RVNAF flying hours had been reduced from 672,000 to 345,500. General Smith later wrote that "crippling limitations were imposed on... firepower and mobility... All of this had a debilitating effect on morale and gave strong encouragement to the enemy."

=== 1975 ===
Signs of the coming PAVN offensive did not go unobserved. The DAO and the Embassy each reported in their own channels events which presaged the approaching campaign and both were occupied with furnishing information to Washington to support the supplemental appropriation for Vietnam military assistance requested by the Ford administration. To see first-hand the situation which the White House said justified at least the US$300 million requested several members of Congress and their staff aides journeyed to South Vietnam. DAO presented these congressional visitors with its estimate of the numerical strength changes that had taken place in PAVN forces in South Vietnam since the ceasefire. Combat units had gained 58,000 men and now had over 200,000 men. Combat and administrative support units had added about 30,000, for a new strength of over 100,000. Viet Cong were not included in these estimates. Armored vehicles, mostly tanks, had risen from about 100 to over 700, while the number of medium artillery pieces was over 400, up from about 100. The PAVN now had twice as many tanks in South Vietnam (about 700) as did the ARVN (352). Papers on construction, lines of communication, supply level and the pipeline showed that the PAVN in the South had built a complex logistical system and had stockpiled enough supplies to support a major offensive for over a year. The PAVN had never in the history of the war been in such a favorable logistical condition. Significantly, the South Vietnamese were, for the first time in the war, in an inferior position. Besides these fact sheets, the DAO furnished the congressional delegation a paper called "Vietnam Perspective." This explained frequently unperceived influences on the relative power, flexibility and tactical potential of the opposing armed forces. For example, although the PAVN's expeditionary force in South Vietnam was less than half the size of the South's combat force, the PAVN made up the difference in troops maintained in secure garrisons in North Vietnam, more than 70,000 of which were available for immediate deployment to South Vietnam. Furthermore, the PAVN possessed the frequently decisive advantages of surprise and the ability to mass overwhelming force. The South Vietnamese, even when they were able to discover the enemy's intent in advance, were often unable to move sufficient reserves to the battle area in time to forestall defeat in detail. The PAVN's advantages also accounted for its ability to accomplish its objectives through the expenditure of far less ammunition than the defenders. Through careful reconnaissance, registration, and siting of batteries in concealed locations, the attacker concentrated heavy fires on small targets, while the defender had to search great areas, cover many avenues of approach and suspected enemy positions, and use much larger amounts of ammunition in the defense. The requirements for defense of populated areas, thousands of bridges and hundreds of miles of highway left the South Vietnamese with few forces available to use in deep or prolonged offensive operations.

In mid-March Smith requested the Pentagon to prioritise all South Vietnamese equipment requests and he passed on Khuyen's request for the LSTs previously proposed by Murray. In a 22 March cable to Admiral Gayler he asked the Admiral to airlift equipment other than tanks to South Vietnam and "to pull out all stops in moving material... even if it requires withdrawing it from US forces. In my judgment, that will be necessary. Time has become most precious out here and unless [the South Vietnamese] can buy enough time to properly execute their retrograde plans...the situation will become desperate." Gayler endorsed Smith's request and promptly sent it on to the Joint Chiefs of Staff.

On 26 March Smith diverted tugs and barges that had been used in ferrying supplies up the Mekong to Phnom Penh to assist in the evacuation of Danang.

An Alternate DAO Programs Activity Office was established at Nakhon Phanom in April to administer military assistance and on 18 April the chief of the military assistance division was directed to proceed to Nakhon Phanom, it was expected that up to 100 staff would follow, however this movement was overcome by events.

On 4 April 1975 35 DAO employees acting as escorts during Operation Babylift were killed when their USAF C-5 transport plane crashed near Tan Son Nhut.

==== Fall of Saigon and Operation Frequent Wind ====
The two major evacuation points chosen for Operation Frequent Wind were the DAO Compound for American civilian and Vietnamese evacuees and the United States Embassy, Saigon for embassy staff.

At 03:30 on 29 April 1975 a PAVN rocket hit Guardpost 1 at the DAO Compound, instantly killing Marine Security Guard Corporals Charles McMahon and Darwin Judge, they would be the last American ground casualties in Vietnam.

At 13:50, two UH-1 helicopters carrying United States Marine Corps General Richard E. Carey and Colonel Alfred M. Gray (commander of Regimental Landing Team 4) landed at the DAO Compound. During their approach to the compound, they experienced a firsthand view of the PAVN's firepower as they shelled nearby Tan Son Nhut Airport with ground, rocket and artillery fire. They quickly established an austere command post in preparation for the arrival of the Marine CH-53s and the ground security force.

At 15:06, a first wave of 12 CH-53s from HMH-462 loaded with the Battalion Landing Team 2nd Battalion 4th Marines (BLT 2/4) command groups "Alpha" and "Bravo," and Company F and reinforced Company H arrived in the DAO Compound and the Marines quickly moved to reinforce the perimeter defenses. The second wave of 12 CH-53s from HMH-463 landed in the DAO Compound at 15:15 bringing in the rest of the BLT. A third wave of two CH-53s from HMH-463 and eight USAF CH-53Cs and two USAF HH-53s (operating from the USS Midway) arrived shortly afterwards. "Alpha" command group, two rifle companies and the 81mm mortar platoon were deployed around the DAO Headquarters building (the Alamo) and its adjacent landing zones. Companies E and F respectively occupied the northern and southern sections between the DAO Headquarters and the DAO Annex. "Bravo" command group, consisting of two rifle companies and the 106mm recoilless rifle platoon, assumed responsibility for security of the DAO Annex and its adjoining landing zones. Company G occupied the eastern section of the Annex, while Company H assumed control of the western section.

The HMH-462 CH-53s loaded with evacuees and left the compound they unloaded the first refugees delivered by Operation Frequent Wind at 15:40.

At about 17:30 Carey ordered the extraction of 3rd Platoon, Company C of BLT 1st Battalion, 9th Marines, which had been landed at the DAO Compound on 25 April to assist the Marine Security Guard at the Embassy. Between 19:00 and 21:00 Carey transferred three platoons (130 men) of BLT 2/4 into the Embassy Compound to provide additional security and assistance for the Embassy. At 19:30 Carey directed that the remaining elements guarding the Annex be withdrawn to DAO Headquarters (the Alamo) where the last of the evacuees would await their flight. Once completed, the new defensive perimeter encompassed only LZ 36 and the Alamo. By 20:30 the last evacuees had been loaded onto helicopters.

At 22:50, with the evacuation of the landing control teams from the Annex and Alamo completed, Carey ordered the withdrawal of the ground security forces from the DAO Compound. At 00:30 on 30 April, Thermite grenades, having been previously placed in selected buildings, ignited as two CH-53s left the DAO parking lot carrying the last elements of BLT 2/4.

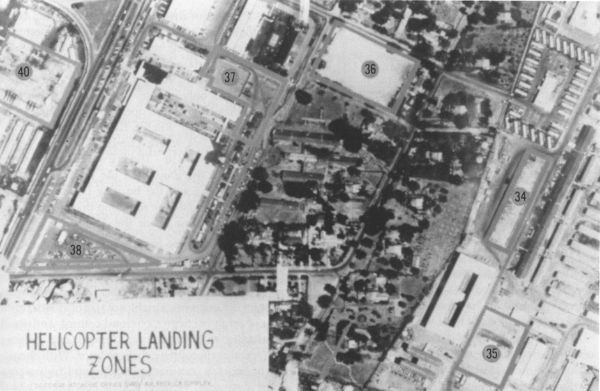
9th MAB intelligence photo of the DAO Compound with LZs marked

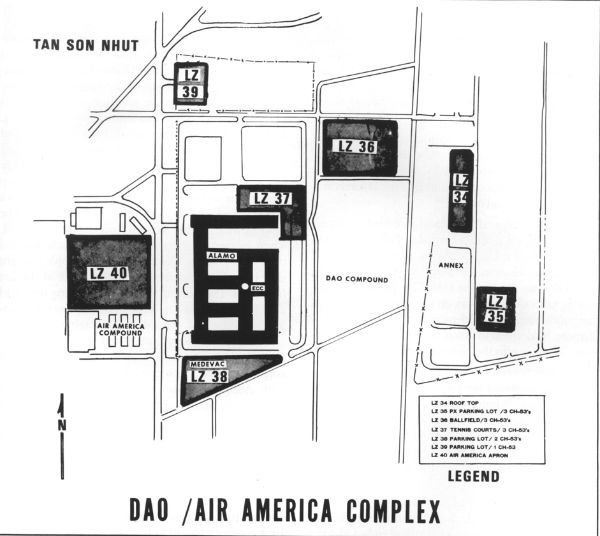
9th MAB post-operation map of the DAO Compound and Air America Compound with LZs marked

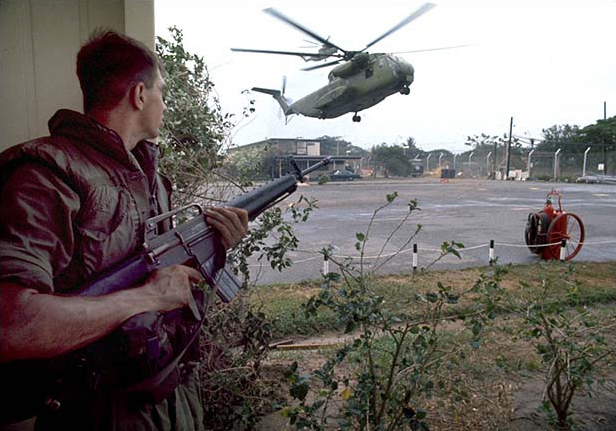
A Marine provides security as helicopters land at the DAO Compound

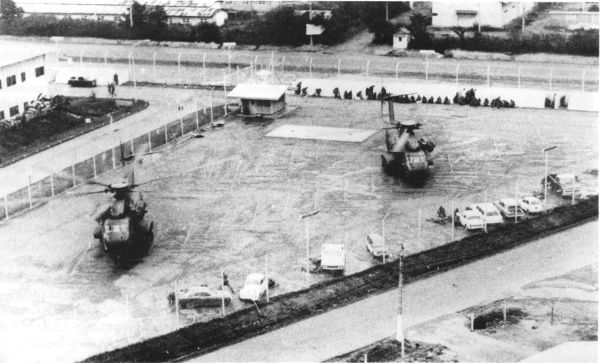
USMC CH-53s at LZ 38

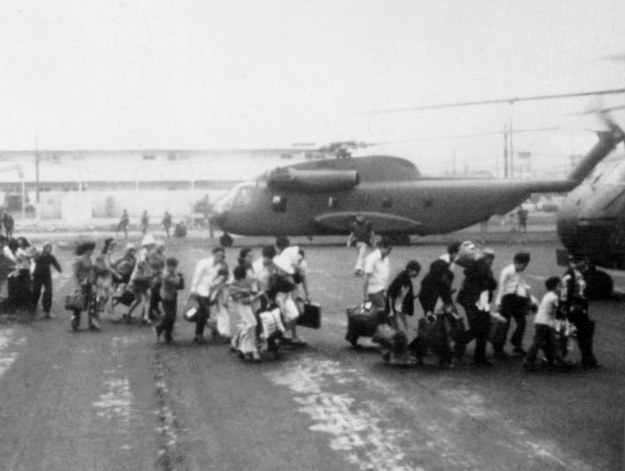
Vietnamese evacuees board a CH-53 at LZ 39

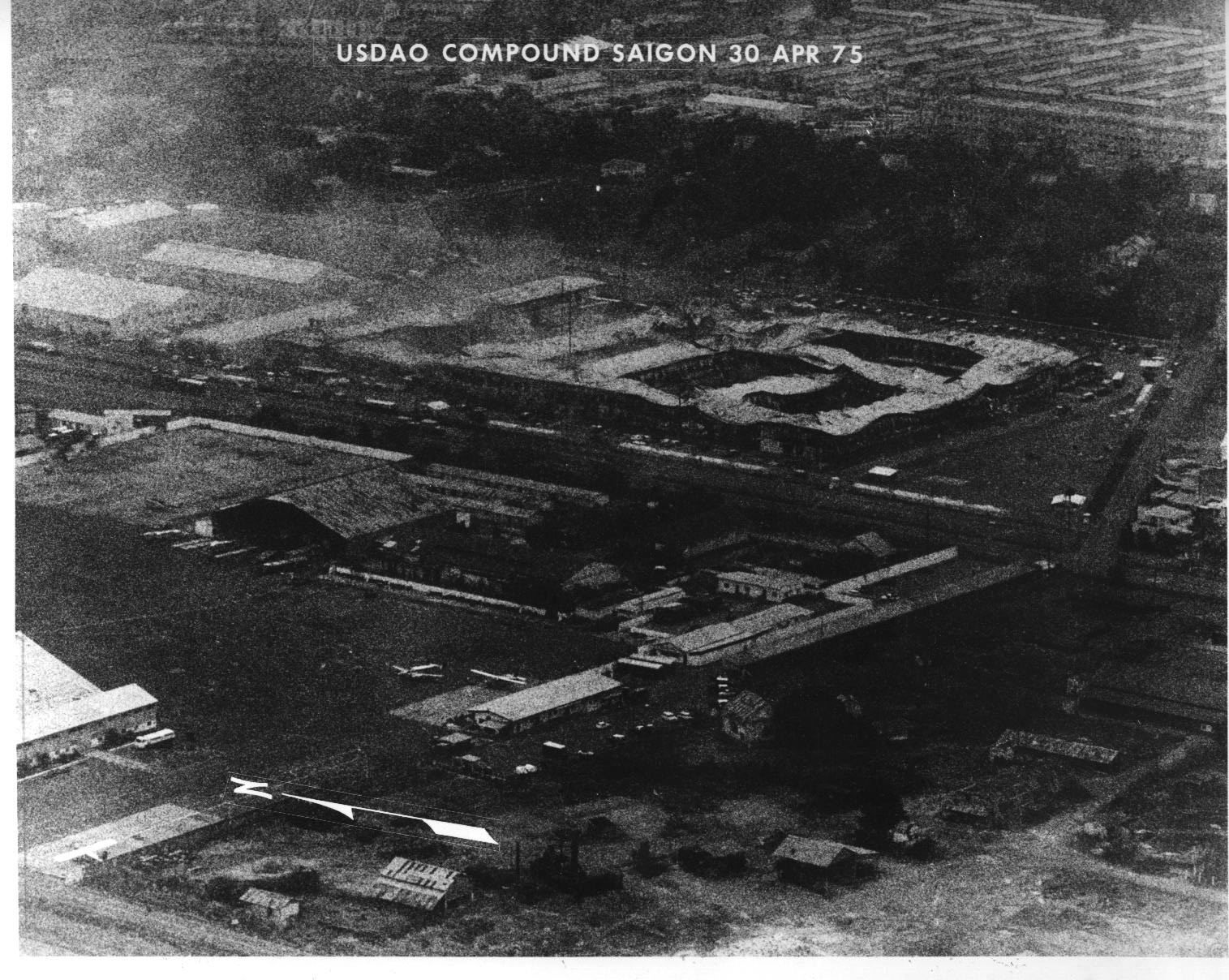
Aerial reconnaissance photos of the destroyed DAO Headquarters building with Air America Compound in the foreground

The evacuation of Saigon and the subsequent surrender of South Vietnam on 30 April 1975 effectively terminated the existence of the DAO, however a DAO residual office was established at Fort Shafter, Hawaii on 29 April. Smith remained in command and requested that his key officers write their personal accounts of the events preceding the withdrawal and this was published in the final DAO report "RVNAF Final Assessment January through April 1975". On 24 May the Secretary of Defense requested retention of a skeleton residual DAO until 31 August 1975 because of continuing Congressional interest and inquiries concerning Vietnam. Due to ongoing reporting requirements the Secretary of Defense designated CINCPAC to assume responsibility for remaining DAO Saigon Defense Assistance Vietnam functions and records after 31 August. The DAO residual office closed on 31 August 1975 and CINCPAC staff assumed any residual functions.

In his final report Smith stated "the funding restraints materially contributed to the total defeat of [the South Vietnamese military] and surrender of the Government of South Vietnam to the North Vietnamese/Provisional Revolutionary Government."

== See also ==
- Defense Attaché System
