= Homer D. Smith =

American general (1922–2011)

Homer D. Smith Jr.
- Born: February 16, 1922; Breckenridge, Texas, U.S.
- Died: March 6, 2011 (aged 89); San Antonio, Texas, U.S.
- Burial place: Fort Sam Houston National Cemetery
- Military career
- Allegiance: United States
- Branch: United States Army
- Service years: 1943–1979
- Rank: Major general
- Commands: U.S. Army Logistics Center; Defense Attaché Office, South Vietnam
- Conflicts: World War II; Korean War; Vietnam War
- Awards: Distinguished Service Medal (2); Legion of Merit; Air Medal

Homer D. Smith Jr. (February 16, 1922 – March 6, 2011) was a United States Army major general.

== Early life and education ==
Smith attended Texas A&M University, graduating in 1943.

== Career ==
=== World War II ===
Smith enlisted in the U.S. Army upon graduation and was deployed to England, where he worked on the logistics planning for the Normandy landings.

=== Korean War ===
7th Infantry Division.

=== Vietnam War ===
On 15 October 1969, Smith, then a colonel, became commanding officer Danang Support Command, South Vietnam.

In August 1974 Smith was appointed as head of the Defense Attaché Office, Saigon (DAO), making him the highest-ranking U.S. military official in South Vietnam. In this role Smith was a key figure in the last year of South Vietnam's existence, finally overseeing Operation Frequent Wind, the evacuation of American civilians and "at-risk" Vietnamese from Saigon in April 1975. Smith left Saigon on 29 April 1975 and later resumed command of the DAO residual office at Fort Shafter, Hawaii.

=== 1975 to 1979 ===
Smith's assignments during this period included the following:

- Deputy chief of staff for logistics of the United States Army Training and Doctrine Command, Fort Monroe, Hampton, Virginia (1975–77)
- Commander, U.S. Army Logistics Center, Fort Lee, Virginia (June 1977-July 1979)

Smith retired from active service in July 1979. Following his retirement he became head of the newly established Logistics Directorate at NATO Headquarters in Haren, Belgium.

== Personal life ==
Smith died on March 6, 2011, in San Antonio, Texas, and was buried at Fort Sam Houston National Cemetery.
