= John E. Murray =

American Army general

John Einar Murray
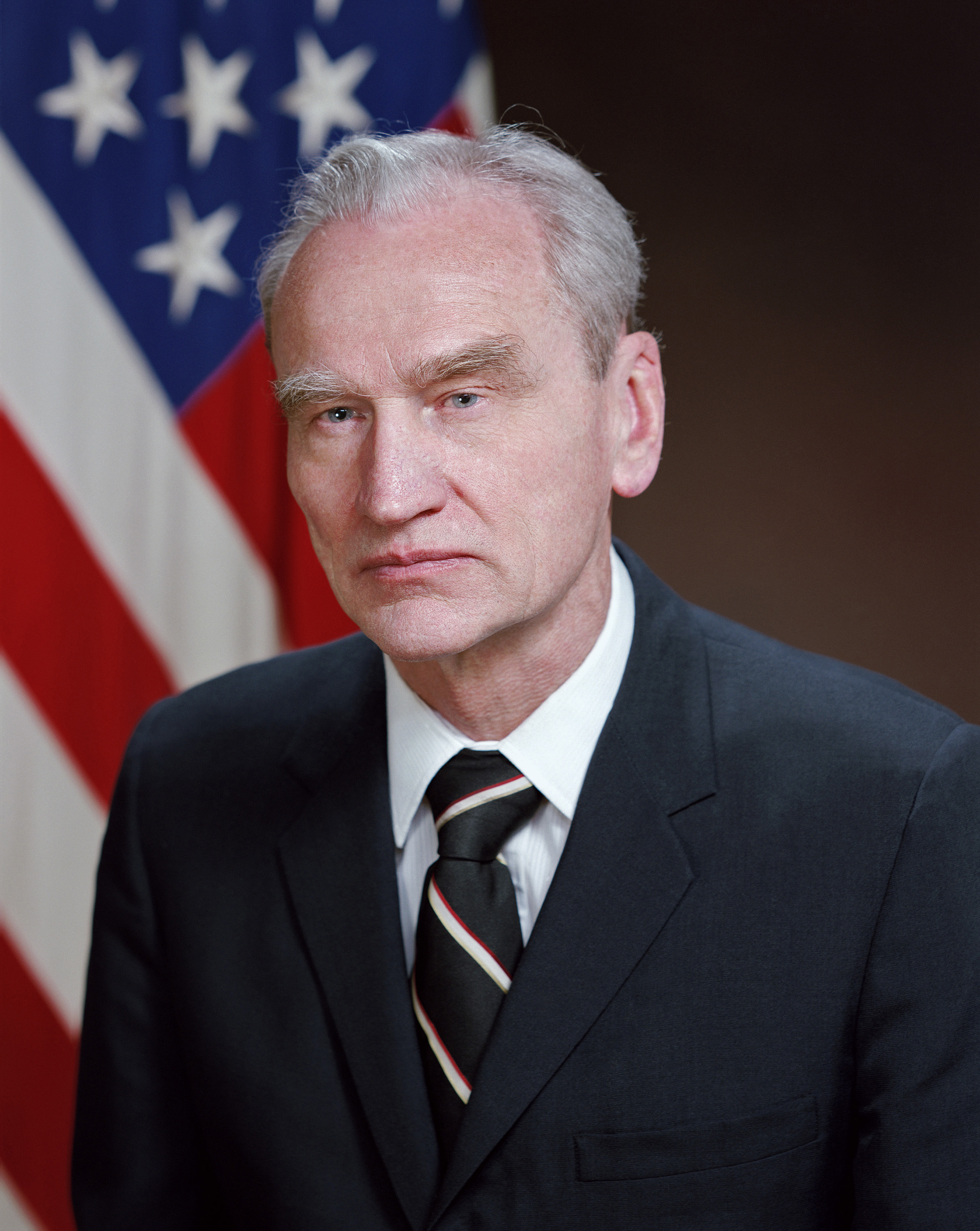
- Murray serving at the US Department of Defense in 1989
- Born: 22 November 1918; Clifton, New Jersey
- Died: 1 September 2008 (aged 89); Norfolk, Virginia
- Military career
- Allegiance: United States of America
- Branch: United States Army
- Service years: 1941–1974
- Rank: Major General
- Conflicts: World War II; Korean War; Vietnam War
- Awards: Distinguished Service Medal; Legion of Merit (5); Bronze Star Medal

John Einar Murray (22 November 1918 – 1 September 2008) was a United States Army Major general, who served as Defense Attaché to South Vietnam during the Vietnam War.

== Early life ==
Murray was born on 22 November 1918 in Clifton, New Jersey.

== Military service ==
While studying at St. John's University, he was drafted into the Army on 9 July 1941 just before the United States entered World War II. Murray was promoted to warrant officer on 11 September 1942 and commissioned as a second lieutenant on 6 January 1943. He later completed an LL.B. degree at New York Law School in October 1949 and an M.A. degree in international affairs at George Washington University in 1961. Murray also graduated from the United States Army War College in 1961.

Murray's Army career spanned three wars and ten military campaigns. He was promoted to Brigadier general on 2 June 1970 and Major general on 1 March 1972.

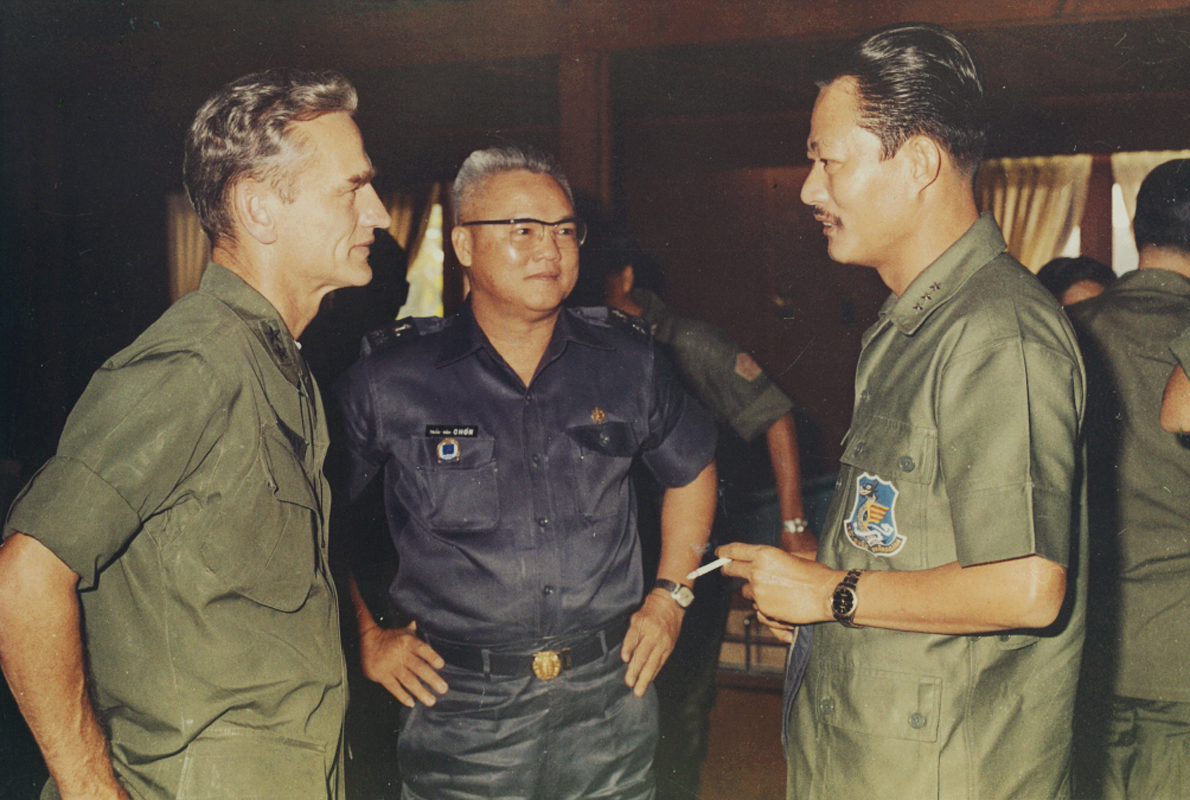
Murray with Navy commander Trần Văn Chơn and Air Force commander Tran Van Minh, March 1973

In January 1973, Murray was appointed as Defense Attaché to South Vietnam.

In late August 1974, Murray wrote that “without proper support the RVNAF (Republic of Vietnam Armed Forces) are going lose, maybe not next week, or next month, but after the year they are going to.”

Murray retired from active duty in the Army on 1 September 1974.

== Later life ==
In June 1975, Murray was conferred an honorary LL.D. degree by New York Law School.

In 1988, Murray was appointed Principal Deputy Assistant Secretary of Defense for Special Operations and Low Intensity Conflict by President Ronald Reagan. He retired from government service in 1989.

After his death in Norfolk, Virginia in 2008, he was interred at Arlington National Cemetery with his wife Elaine Claire Murray (10 September 1921 – 3 May 1970).
