= USS Jerome County =

1944 LST-542-class tank landing ship

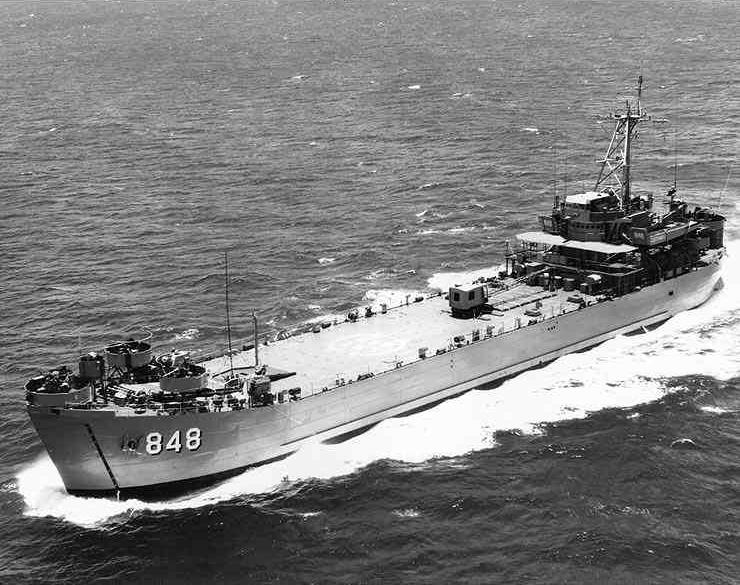
- USS Jerome County (LST-848) operating off the coast of Oahu, Hawaii, 15 June 1968

History

United States
- Name: USS LST-848
- Builder: American Bridge Company, Ambridge, Pennsylvania
- Laid down: 6 November 1944
- Launched: 21 December 1944
- Commissioned: 20 January 1945
- Decommissioned: 10 August 1946
- Renamed: USS Jerome County (LST-848), 1 July 1955
- Recommissioned: 7 December 1959
- Decommissioned: 1 April 1970
- Honours and awards: 5 battle stars, Presidential Unit Citation, Meritorious Unit Commendation (Vietnam)
- Fate: Leased to South Vietnam, April 1970

South Vietnam
- Name: RVN Nha Trang (HQ-505)
- Acquired: April 1970
- Fate: Escaped to the Philippines, April 1975

Philippines
- Name: RPS Agusan del Sur (1975), BRP Agusan del Sur (1980)
- Acquired: April 1975
- Decommissioned: 1986
- Fate: Sold for scrap 1992

General characteristics
- Class & type: LST-542-class tank landing ship
- Displacement: 1,490 long tons (1,514 t) light; 4,080 long tons (4,145 t) full
- Length: 328 ft (100 m)
- Beam: 50 ft (15 m)
- Draft: Unloaded : 2 ft 4 in (0.71 m) forward; 7 ft 6 in (2.29 m) aft; Loaded : 8 ft 2 in (2.49 m) forward; 14 ft 1 in (4.29 m) aft
- Propulsion: 2 × General Motors 12-567 diesel engines, two shafts, twin rudders
- Speed: 12 knots (22 km/h; 14 mph)
- Boats & landing craft carried: 2 × LCVPs
- Troops: 16 officers, 147 enlisted men
- Complement: 7 officers, 104 enlisted men
- Armament: 8 × 40 mm guns; 12 × 20 mm guns

USS Jerome County (LST-848) was an LST-542-class tank landing ship built for the United States Navy during World War II. Named after Jerome County, Idaho, she was the only U.S. Naval vessel to bear the name.

USS LST-848 was laid down on 6 November 1944 at Ambridge, Pennsylvania by the American Bridge Company; launched on 21 December 1944, sponsored by Mrs. F. D. Porter; and commissioned on 20 January 1945.

== Service history ==
=== World War II, 1945 ===
Following shakedown off Florida, LST-848 departed New Orleans on 24 February for the Pacific. After touching Balboa, Panama in the Canal Zone and West Coast ports, she proceeded to Hawaii, arriving at Kalua Harbor on 9 April. For the next six weeks, she engaged in amphibious exercises in the Hawaiian Islands before sailing to the Marianas. Arriving at Guam on 11 June, LST-848 shuttled troops and equipment from the Marianas to Okinawa for the duration of World War II.

=== 1945–1946 ===
When Japan accepted Allied peace terms, thereby ending the war, the landing ship was assigned to transport occupation forces in the Far East. Operating between the Philippines and Japan, LST-848 carried troops, vehicles, and cargo to support American forces in the Pacific. She departed Japan in early December and, after stays at Saipan and Pearl Harbor, arrived at San Francisco on 11 February 1946. Following operations along the West Coast, she sailed to Astoria, Oregon early in April and decommissioned at Vancouver, Washington on 10 August 1946.

While berthed with the Columbia River group, Pacific Reserve Fleet, LST-848 was named USS Jerome County (LST-848) on 1 July 1955.

=== 1959–1965 ===
Jerome County recommissioned on 7 December 1959, then completed a shakedown along the Pacific coast. On 14 May 1960 she departed from San Pedro, Los Angeles for mid-Pacific missile operations out of Midway Island. After five months in support of the U.S. missile program, she returned to San Diego late October. During 1961, Jerome County participated in amphibious training exercises along the California coast; then on 12 January 1962 she sailed for the mid-Pacific. Assigned to "Operation Dominic", she performed weather studies, charting, and communications during the U.S. nuclear tests of that year. The veteran LST returned to San Diego on 18 August to resume amphibious training exercises. From August 1962 until August 1965 Jerome County usually operated along the West Coast in addition to two mid-Pacific deployments.

=== Vietnam War, 1965–1970 ===
Following the increased American commitment to assist the South Vietnamese government against the North Vietnamese Communists, Jerome County sailed for Southeast Asia on 10 August 1965. Arriving Chu Lai, South Vietnam on 11 September, she supported U.S. operations in Asia for the next three months. The landing ship returned San Diego on 22 December. Jerome County sailed again for the Far East on 3 March 1966 and arrived at Da Nang, South Vietnam, on 8 April. She unloaded her cargo and continued shuttling supplies, ammunition, and equipment in and out of the war zone until departing from Subic Bay on 1 September for home. She arrived at San Diego on 13 October and operated along the West Coast for the remainder of the year and into 1967 preparing for future action.

=== Transfer to South Vietnam, and the Philippines ===
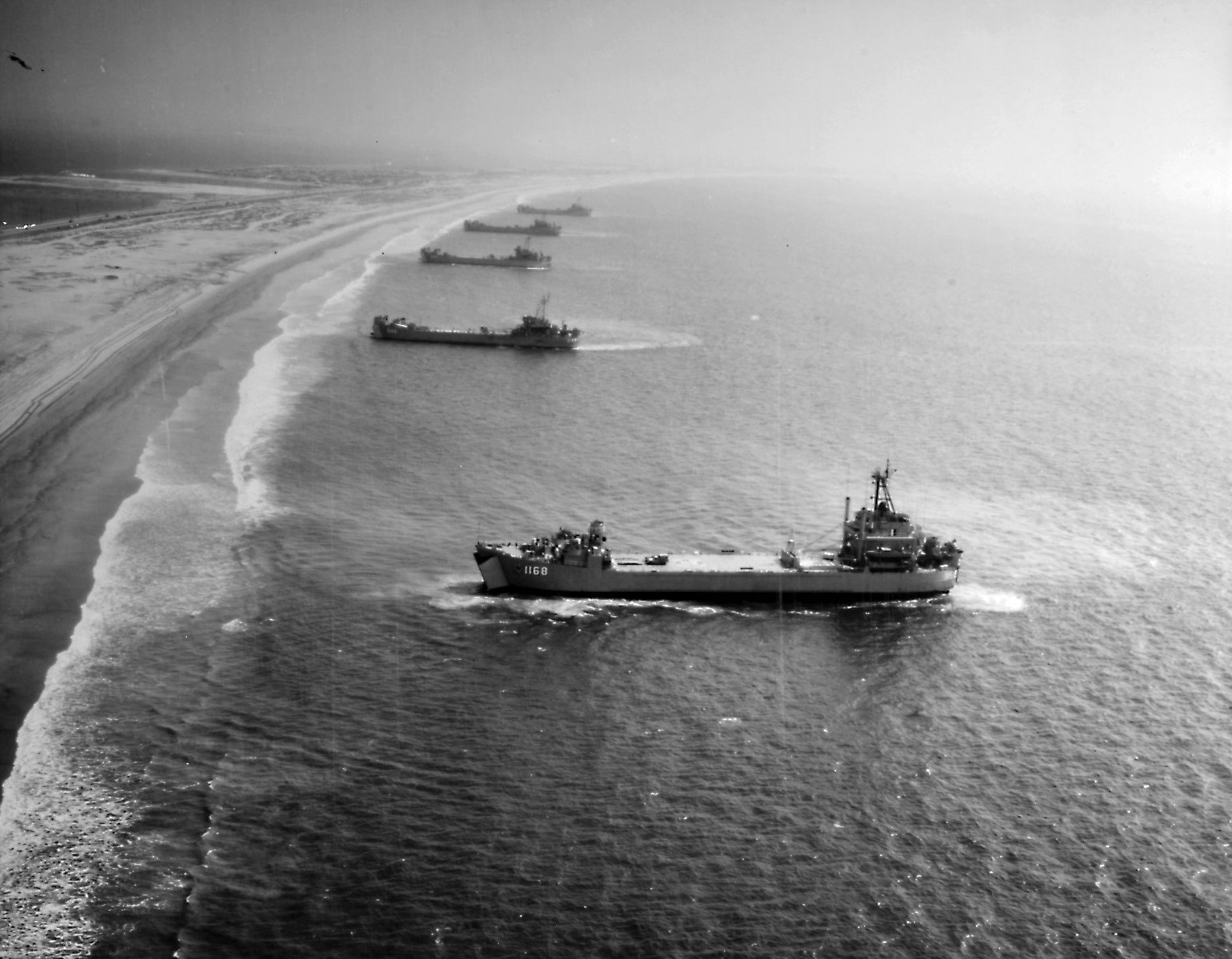
From foreground, the Wexford County (LST-1168), USS Jerome County (LST-848), Polk County (LST-1084), and two unidentified LSTs conduct landing practice off San Diego, c. the 1960s.

In mid-1969 a planned fourth Southeast Asian deployment was cancelled, and Jerome County was instead prepared for transfer abroad. Decommissioned again on 1 April 1970 she was turned over, via lease, to the Republic of Vietnam Navy that same month. She became the Republic of Vietnam Navy ship RVN Nha Trang (HQ-505) in April 1970. Five years later, at the fall of South Vietnam, she escaped to the Philippines and subsequently became the Philippine Navy's RPS Agusan Del Sur (LT-54). The ship was decommissioned by 1986, and was discarded by the Philippine Navy about 1992. Her final fate is unknown.

== Awards ==
LST-848 earned one award of the Presidential Unit Citation, one award of the Meritorious Unit Commendation, and five battle stars for the Vietnam War.
