= 1974 in the Vietnam War =

← 1973 1975 →
Location	Indochina

Belligerents
Anti-Communist forces: South Vietnam (Cambodia) Khmer Republic	Communist forces: North Vietnam (Provisional Revolutionary Government of the Republic of South Vietnam) Viet Cong (Cambodia) Khmer Rouge; Soviet Union (Laos) Pathet Lao; People's Republic of China

Casualties and losses
South Vietnam: ~30,000 killed	U.S. estimate: ~61,000 PAVN/VC killed

1974 saw ongoing combat in South Vietnam despite the promises of the Paris Peace Accords. The impact of the 1973 oil crisis, reduced U.S. expenditure and the resignation of Richard Nixon in the wake of the Watergate scandal undermined the South Vietnamese economy and U.S. support for South Vietnam. The South Vietnamese were forced to reduce military operations to conserve fuel and ammunition, causing a decline in morale and moving the balance of military power in favor of the North Vietnamese.

== January ==
19 January

The Battle of the Paracel Islands was an engagement fought between the naval forces of the People's Republic of China and South Vietnam in the Paracel Islands. The Republic of Vietnam Navy lost 75 killed and 48 captured and one Corvette sunk while the People's Liberation Army Navy lost 18 killed. As a result of the battle, the PRC established de facto control over the Paracels.

25 January

After meetings with Defense Attaché Office (DAO) commander General John E. Murray, General Cao Văn Viên, chairman of the Joint General Staff and his head of logistics General Dong Van Khuyen ordered cuts to ammunition and fuel supplies for all units due to budgetary constraints.

== February ==
12 February to 4 May

In the Battle of Tri Phap Army of the Republic of Vietnam (ARVN) forces launched an attack on a People's Army of Vietnam (PAVN) base at Tri Phap, Dinh Tuong Province.

== March ==
27 March to 2 May

The Battle of Svay Rieng was the last major operation of the war to be mounted by the ARVN against the PAVN. The battle resulted in over 1,200 PAVN killed and 65 captured for ARVN losses of less than 100 killed.

== April ==
1-10 April

Chí Linh Camp defended by the 215th Regional Force Company with a platoon of two 105 mm howitzers was attacked by the PAVN 7th Division, quickly damaging the two howitzers and destroying the ammunition dump. On 5 April the PAVN 3rd Battalion, 141st Regiment, with the division's 28th Sapper and 22d Artillery Battalion supporting, overran the base. By 10 April, about half of the defenders and 20 dependents had straggled into Đồng Xoài or Chơn Thành Camp to the west. The rest, about 50 men, remained unaccounted for. With the elimination of Chí Linh, the PAVN 7th Division enjoyed unimpeded movement along Highway 14 between Chơn Thành and Đồng Xoài.

4 April

The Provisional Government of National Union (PGNU) was formed in Laos.

== May ==
6 May

Associated Press photographer Slava "Sal" Veder wins the Pulitzer Prize for Feature Photography for his photo Burst of Joy.

15 May

United States Air Force (USAF) EC-47 Airborne Radio Direction Finding missions, flown continuously since 1966, were discontinued and the responsibility for this task was assumed by the 7th Radio Research Field Station at Ramasun Station, Udon Thani Province, Thailand.

16 May to 20 November

The Battle of the Iron Triangle began on 16 May, when the PAVN 9th Division backed by a small contingent of tanks launched an attack on Rach Bap, took possession of An Dien and pushed south towards Phu Cuong. The ARVN counterattacked in mid-November and by 20 November had recaptured Rach Bap.

== June ==
1 June

General Murray sent a cable to The Pentagon criticising reductions in military aid saying that "you can roughly equate cuts in support to loss of real estate" and that as aid decreased South Vietnam would be forced to retreat to a rump state based on Saigon and the Mekong Delta. Murray advised that South Vietnam needed a minimum aid level of US$1.126 billion, but even this would not replace lost and damaged equipment, with aid of US$900 million military capacity would decline after mid-1975, with aid at US$750 million South Vietnam would be unable to stop a major attack, while at US$600 million the US should "write off South Vietnam as a bad investment and broken promise."

3 June

The PAVN hit Bien Hoa Air Base with at least 40 122 mm rockets doing minor damage to runways and destroying 500 Napalm canisters, but without damaging any aircraft. Other rockets exploded in hamlets surrounding the base, killing and wounding civilians. Rockets also hit the Bien Hoa prisoner of war camp, killing 29 and wounding 63, most of those killed were female political prisoners and their children.

== July ==
1 July

U.S. aid to South Vietnam is reduced from $1.1 billion in fiscal year 1974 (July 1973-June 1974) to $750 million in fiscal year 1975 (July 1974-June 1975).

18 July to 4 October

The Battle of Duc Duc begins with the PAVN attacking ARVN outposts near Duc Duc, Quảng Nam Province. The ARVN 3rd Division would suffer 4,700 casualties in the battle.

18 July to 3 November

The Battle of Thượng Đức began when a regiment of the PAVN 324th Division overran the An Hoa Industrial Complex and then attacked the town of Thượng Ðức 40 km southwest of Danang. The costly battle would result in a Pyrrhic victory for the ARVN.

== August ==
6 August

A report of the Senate Foreign Relations Committee based on a visit to South Vietnam from 12 May to 4 June criticized the U.S. Embassy as being too close to the Saigon government. The report was very pessimistic about South Vietnam's future saying that unless outside powers applied strong pressure, the South Vietnamese Government and the Communists would fail to reach a political settlement. It also questioned the benefits of the US$750 million aid request.

9 August

Richard Nixon leaves the White House after resigning as President

U.S. President Richard Nixon resigned due to the Watergate Scandal. He was succeeded as president by Vice President Gerald Ford.

28 August to 10 December

The Battle of Phú Lộc began as PAVN captured a series of hills in Phú Lộc District and installed artillery that closed Phu Bai Air Base and interdicted Highway 1. The hills were recaptured by the ARVN in costly fighting that depleted its reserve forces.

In a debriefing meeting with CINCPAC Admiral Noel Gayler in Hawaii at the end of his time as commander of the DAO, General Murray warned of the devastating impact of the aid cuts and Thiệu's misplaced confidence that aid would be restored. Murray warned that "without proper support, the [South Vietnamese] are going to lose, maybe not next week, or next month, but after the year they are going to."

== September ==
12 September

The USAF completed its withdrawal from Takhli Royal Thai Air Force Base, handing the base back to the Royal Thai Air Force.

15 September

A hijacker took control of an Air Vietnam Boeing 727-121C on a flight from Da Nang to Saigon and demanded to be flown to Hanoi. The crew attempted to land at Phan Rang Air Base, overshot the landing and then crashed while turning to make another approach killing all 75 onboard.

26 September

BirdAir began operating supply flights from U-Tapao Royal Thai Navy Airfield to Phnom Penh using unmarked USAF supported C-130s crewed by civilians.

== October ==
10 October

Saigon Police attacked about 300 Vietnamese journalists and 1,000 supporters protesting against censorship under Press Law 007.

31 October

75 civilians and policemen are injured in Saigon in anti-corruption protests led by Reverend Tran Huu Thanh, a Catholic priest.

== November ==
1 November

The USAF placed Ubon Royal Thai Air Force Base on standby status with 350 U.S. personnel remaining to maintain the facilities and provide initial capability to receive units back at the base if required.

== December ==
From July 1965 to the end of 1974, some 6,500 officers and generals, as well as more than 4,500 soldiers and sergeants of the Soviet Armed Forces participated in the war.

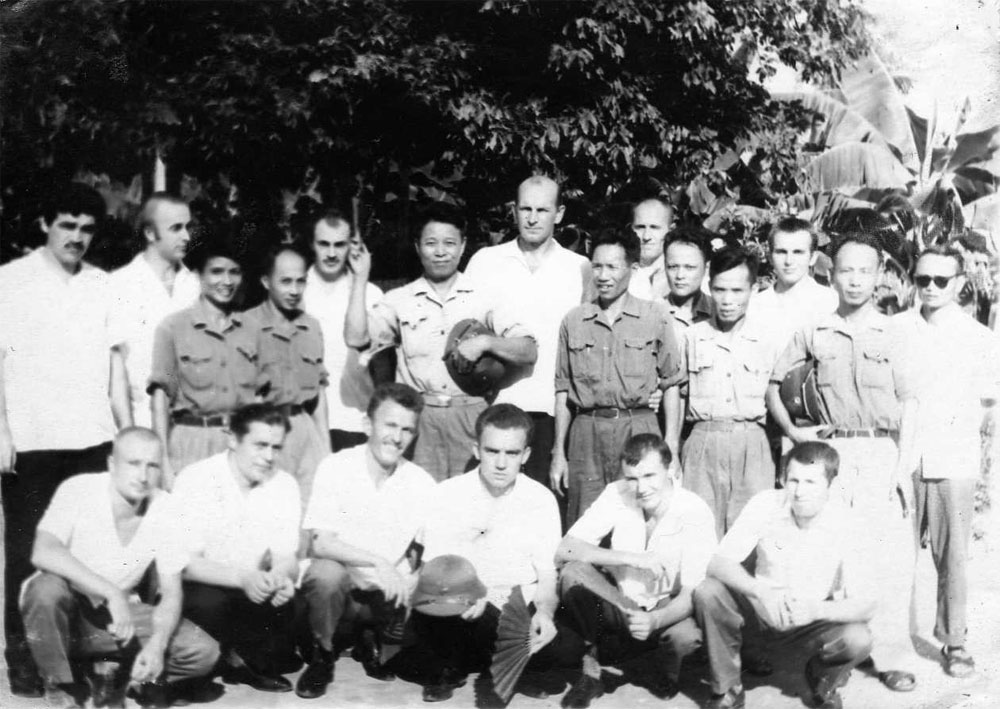
Soviet military advisers to the PAVN 238th Anti-aircraft Missile Regiment in 1968

13 December to 6 January 1975

The Battle of Phuoc Long began in Phuoc Long Province, about 100 km (62 mi) from Saigon. The campaign against Phuoc Long reflected North Vietnam's change in policy after the strategic raids of 1974, taking full advantage of South Vietnam's critical military situation.

14 December

On or about this date the Pathet Lao executed Charles Dean and Neil Sharman, backpackers who were captured southeast of Vientiane on 4 September.

18 December to 8 January 1975

North Vietnamese political and military leaders held a strategy planning conference attended in part by Soviet General Viktor Kulikov.

December to 6 January 1975

The 80-man 3rd Company, 314th Regional Force Battalion guarding the radio relay station on the summit of Nui Ba Den began receiving attacks of increasing intensity and frequency. PAVN assaults on Nui Ba Den continued throughout December 1974, but the RF Company held on. RVNAF efforts to resupply the troops on Nui Ba Den were largely unsuccessful. Helicopters were driven off by heavy fire, and fighter-bombers were forced to excessive altitudes by SA-7 missiles and antiaircraft artillery. One F-5A fighter-bomber was shot down by an SA-7 on 14 December. Finally on 6 January 1975, without food and water and with nearly all ammunition expended, the company picked up its wounded and withdrew down the mountain to friendly lines.

== Year in numbers ==
Armed Force	KIA	Reference	Military costs – 1974	Military costs in 2026 US$	Reference
South Vietnam
North Vietnam
