= 1975 in the Vietnam War =

← 1974
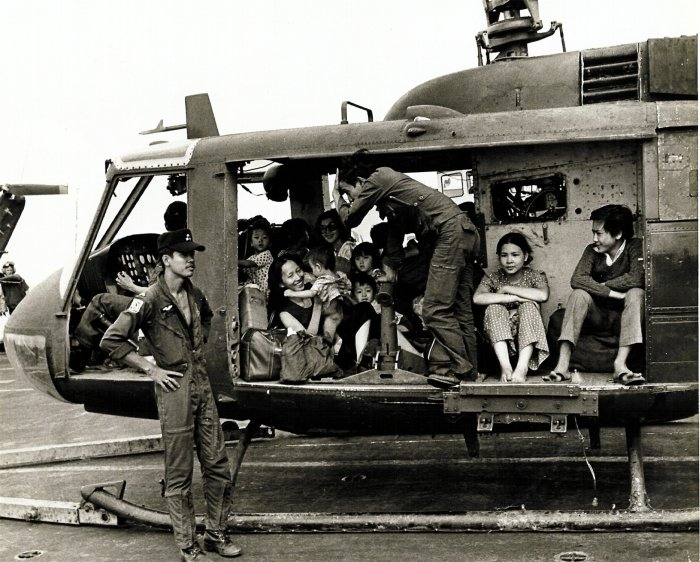
- An RVNAF UH-1H loaded with Vietnamese evacuees on the deck of the U.S. aircraft carrier USS Midway during Operation Frequent Wind, 29 April 1975
Location	Indochina
Result	Decisive North Vietnamese/NLF victory

Belligerents
Anti-Communist forces: South Vietnam; United States (Cambodia) Khmer Republic; Kingdom of Laos	Communist forces: North Vietnam (Provisional Revolutionary Government of the Republic of South Vietnam) Viet Cong (Cambodia) Khmer Rouge (Laos) Pathet Lao

Casualties and losses
South Vietnam: ~1.1 million killed or captured, US: 62 killed	North Vietnam claim:~10,000 killed, 15,999 wounded

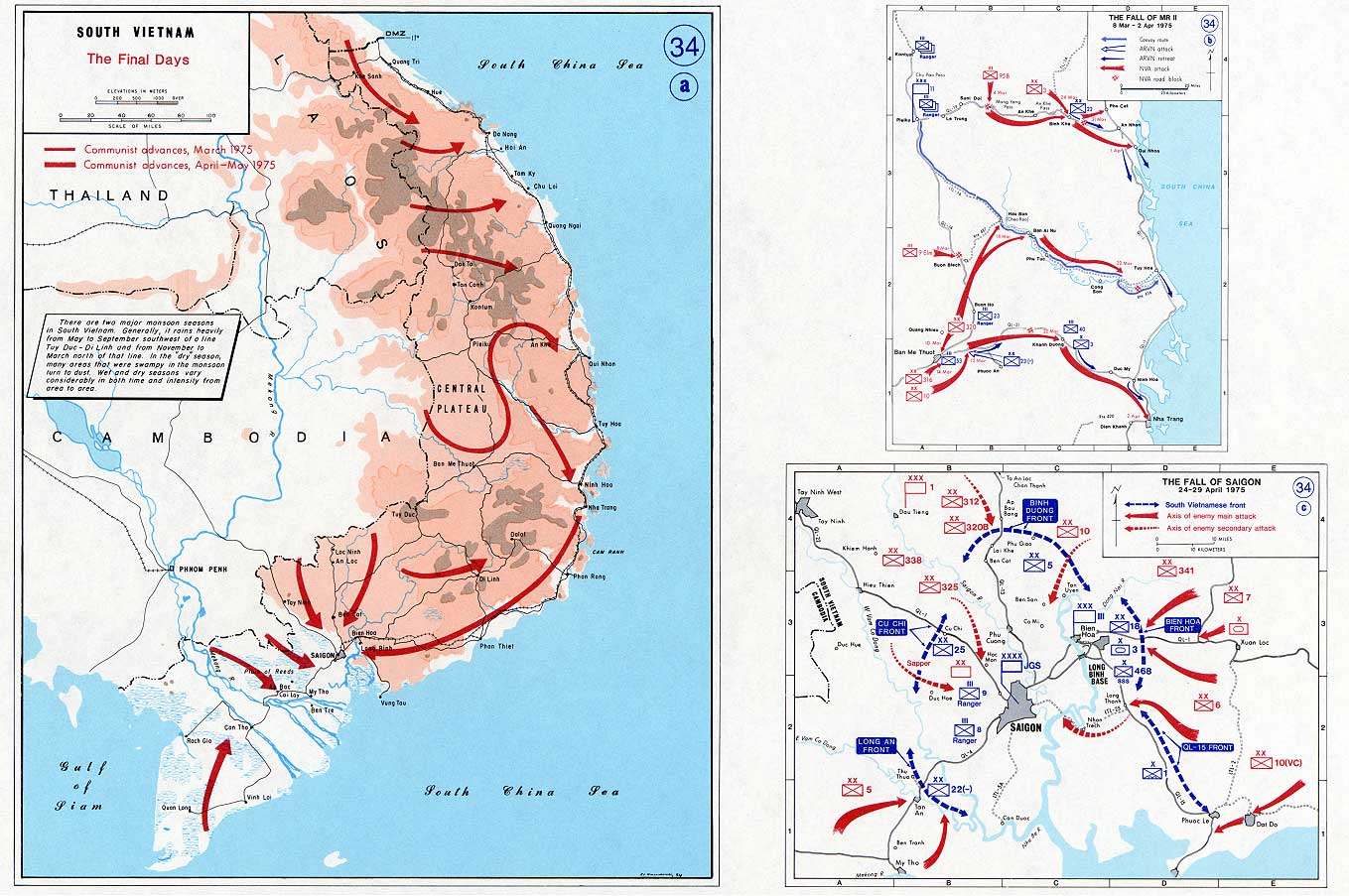

1975 marked the end of the Vietnam War. The North Vietnamese People's Army of Vietnam (PAVN) launched the Spring Offensive in March; the South Vietnamese Army of the Republic of Vietnam (ARVN) was quickly defeated. The North Vietnamese captured Saigon on April 30, accepting the surrender of South Vietnam. In the final days of the war, the United States, which had supported South Vietnam for many years, carried out an emergency evacuation of its civilian and military personnel and more than 130,000 Vietnamese.

At the beginning of the Spring Offensive the balance of forces in Vietnam was approximately as follows; North Vietnam: 305,000 soldiers, 600 armored vehicles and 490 heavy artillery pieces in South Vietnam and South Vietnam: 1.0 million soldiers, 1,200 to 1,400 tanks and more than 1,000 pieces of heavy artillery.

The capital city of Cambodia, Phnom Penh, was captured by the Khmer Rouge on April 17. On December 2 the Pathet Lao took over the government of Laos, thus completing the communist conquest of the three Indochinese countries.

== January ==
1 January

In Cambodia, the Khmer Rouge attacked and drove back the government forces near Phnom Penh, the capital city. The Khmer Rouge now controlled 80 percent of the country and soon began attacking Phnom Penh, crowded with refugees, with rockets.

3 January

The Jackson–Vanik amendment was signed into law in the U.S., its passage was a reason for increased Soviet military aid to North Vietnam as it abrogated secret Nixon administration trade commitments with the Soviet Union.

6 January

Phước Bình, the capital of Phước Long Province, 120 kilometres (75 miles) north of Saigon, was captured by the PAVN, becoming the first provincial capital controlled by the North Vietnamese. All but 850 of 5,400 South Vietnamese soldiers defending the province were killed or captured. The lack of a military response by the US to the loss of a province persuaded North Vietnam that it could take more aggressive actions.

8 January

Delegates to a Politburo conference in North Vietnam agreed that the US was not going to intervene militarily in South Vietnam and therefore North Vietnam had the opportunity to "destroy and disintegrate" the South Vietnamese military.

11 January

The United States Department of State protested that North Vietnam had violated the 1973 Paris Peace Accords by infiltrating 160,000 soldiers and 400 armored vehicles into South Vietnam. North Vietnam had improved the Ho Chi Minh trail, now a network of all-weather roads, through Cambodia and Laos and expanded their armament stockpiles.

21 January

Asked at a press conference if there were circumstances under which the United States might again actively participate in the Vietnam War, U.S. President Gerald Ford said, "I cannot foresee any at the moment."

26 January

The last Mekong River supply convoy from South Vietnam arrived in Phnom Penh, five vessels had been destroyed by Khmer Rouge mines and ambushes. Henceforth, Phnom Penh was isolated from any outside assistance except by air, effectively surrounded by the Khmer Rouge.

28 January

Ford asked Congress for an additional $522 million in military aid to assist South Vietnam and Cambodia. Ford said that North Vietnam now had 289,000 troops in South Vietnam and large numbers of tanks, artillery and anti-aircraft weapons.

30 January

South Vietnamese President Nguyễn Văn Thiệu declared the dissolution of the Hòa Hảo militia and over the following weeks there would be numerous clashes between the Hòa Hảo and ARVN forces in the Mekong Delta.

== February ==
5 February

PAVN General Văn Tiến Dũng arrived in South Vietnam to take command of PAVN/VC forces. He decided that capture of the city of Ban Mê Thuột, the capital of Đắk Lắk Province, would be his first objective.

25 February - 3 March

A bipartisan Congressional delegation visited South Vietnam at the request of Ford. The delegation was led by John Flynt, a supporter of continued aid to South Vietnam and included Bella Abzug, Donald M. Fraser and Pete McCloskey, all opponents of continued aid. The delegation was unable to agree a unified position, other than their dislike of Ambassador Graham Martin.

== March ==
4 March

The PAVN began "Campaign 275" to capture the Central Highlands with diversionary attacks near Kon Tum and Pleiku while building up forces near Ban Me Thuot, the main objective of the campaign.

10 March

The PAVN launched its attack on Ban Me Thuot, and by nightfall they held the center of the city although fighting continued in the outskirts.

12 March

The ARVN II Corps commander, General Phạm Văn Phú, reported to his government that the PAVN were firmly in control of Ban Me Thuot.

Captured in the PAVN assault on Ban Me Thuot were 14 foreigners, including American missionaries with a six-year-old daughter and Paul Struharik, the provincial representative of the United States. The prisoners were taken to North Vietnam and held captive until being released on October 30.

An Air Vietnam DC-4 crashed 25 km southwest of Pleiku while on a flight from Vientiane to Saigon killing all 26 on board, including New Zealand Red Cross team leader Malcolm Riding. The wreckage could not be inspected to determine the cause of the crash due to fighting in the area.

14 March

Thiệu met with his military commanders and unrealistically ordered General Phú to retake Ban Me Thuot. All ARVN forces were to be withdrawn from other parts of the Central Highlands to be reassembled for the assault on Ban Me Thuot and for the defense of the coast. The withdrawal was to be carried out with secrecy. U.S. authorities and South Vietnamese provincial leaders were not informed of this decision. The provincial forces, mostly Montagnard highlanders, were to be abandoned.

15 March

Phú abandoned efforts to retake Ban Me Thuot and began the retreat to the coast. The ARVN 23rd Division at Ban Me Thuot had been destroyed, with many desertions as South Vietnamese soldiers attempted to save themselves and their families, a pattern that would continue during the remainder of the war.

16 March

The withdrawal of the ARVN from the Central Highlands, mostly the troops stationed in the cities of Pleiku and Kon Tum, began. The only route open to many was Route 7B, a highway in poor repair. As most senior ARVN officers had departed the highlands by helicopter, many of the remaining soldiers were a leaderless mob mixed with fleeing civilians. In the "convoy of tears", under fire by the PAVN, only about 60,000 of 180,000 fleeing civilians were known to have reached the coast and temporary safety. Only 900 of 7,000 South Vietnamese Rangers, who provided most of the defense of the convoy and 5,000 of 20,000 other South Vietnamese soldiers are known to have survived. Many of the soldiers probably deserted rather than report for duty.

18-9 March

The ARVN abandoned An Lộc with the 32nd Ranger Group withdrawing along Highway 13 to Chơn Thành Camp.

19 March

Quảng Trị, the northernmost city of South Vietnam, was occupied by the PAVN without a fight, the defenders having been evacuated by sea.

24 March

North Vietnam changed the name of Campaign 275 to the "Ho Chi Minh Campaign." The original plan of North Vietnam had been to gain control over the Central Highlands in 1975 and complete its conquest of the country in 1976. However, the rapid collapse of South Vietnamese defenses resulted in General Dung being given a more ambitious objective: the capture of Saigon before the birthday of Ho Chi Minh on May 19 and the onset of the rainy season at approximately the same date.

24 March - 1 April

Two Regiments of the PAVN 9th Division supported by tanks attacked Chơn Thành Camp. The defenders destroyed seven T-54s with antitank rockets and recoilless rifle fire and, together with RVNAF airstrikes, they killed more than 100 PAVN soldiers. On 26 March, the 9th Division attacked again, apparently trying to retrieve disabled tanks, but was repulsed again. By 27 March the 273rd Regiment was sent to reinforce the 9th Division for another assault on the camp. After 2 attacks the PAVN had been repulsed for the loss of 240 killed and 11 tanks destroyed, while ARVN losses were 50 killed and wounded. At dawn on 31 March following a 3,000 round bombardment, the entire 9th Division, 273rd Regiment and the remaining tanks attacked Chơn Thành again. The PAVN penetrated the camp defenses three times and were repulsed each time. However resupply, reinforcement and medical evacuation from the camp was now impossible and the Ranger commander received permission to abandon Chơn Thành. On 1 April the RVNAF saturated the PAVN assembly areas and bivouacs with 52 sorties; under the cover of this attack, the Ranger and RF battalions began withdrawing separately to Bàu Bàng and Lai Khê, taking the remaining artillery and M41 tanks with them. One Ranger battalion and the RF battalion were ambushed and suffered moderate losses, but the 31st Ranger Group was now available to support South Vietnamese defenses elsewhere.

25 March

After the fall of Quảng Trị, Hué, 60 kilometres (37 miles) south, was the next major city to fall to the PAVN. The defenders were evacuated by sea. Both civilians and soldiers had begun abandoning the city several days earlier and headed south toward Da Nang, South Vietnam's second largest city.

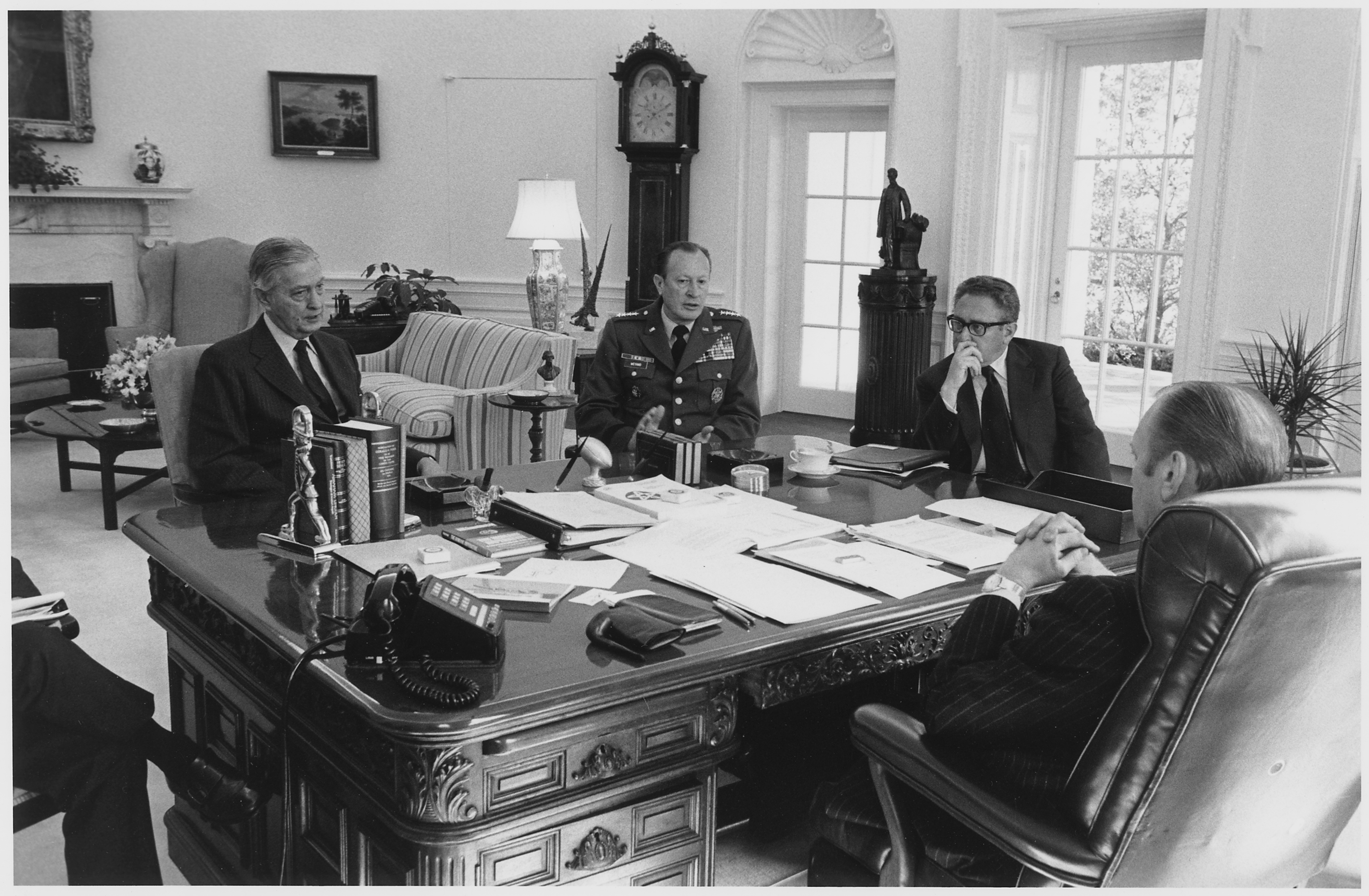
Ambassador Graham Martin, General Frederick Weyand, Secretary of State Henry Kissinger and President Gerald Ford discuss the situation in South Vietnam, 25 March.

28 March

Ford authorized the use of U.S. navy vessels to assist in the evacuation of South Vietnamese cities.

The New Zealand surgical team is evacuated from Qui Nhơn ending a 12-year presence there.

29 March

Da Nang, 80 kilometres (50 miles) south of Hué, was the next city to fall to PAVN forces. Crowded with a half million refugees, 70,000 people had been evacuated by barge or air during the previous several days. ARVN soldiers forced themselves onto the evacuation planes and barges and comprised a large share of the evacuees, but the 16,000 soldiers evacuated were little more than 10 percent of the total ARVN force which had been stationed in I Corps. The former US naval and air base of Cam Ranh Bay, almost 400 kilometres (250 miles) south, was the destination of most of the people evacuated.

31 March

U.S. Army Chief of Staff Frederick C. Weyand in South Vietnam assessed the situation. "It is possible that with abundant resupply and a great deal of luck, the GVN [Government of South Vietnam] could survive...It is extremely doubtful that it could withstand an offensive involving the commitment of three additional Communist divisions...without U.S. strategic air support." Colonel William Le Gro of the U.S. Embassy said that without U.S. strategic bombing of North Vietnamese forces, South Vietnam would be defeated within 90 days.

General Dung, was notified by his government that, due to the rapid collapse of South Vietnamese armed forces, he was to "liberate Saigon before the rainy season [mid-May]" The original plan had been to wait until 1976 before attacking Saigon and the southern one-half of South Vietnam.

Technicians from the United States Atomic Energy Commission escorted by Navy SEALS removed the fuel rods from the nuclear research reactor at Dalat University and flew them to Johnston Atoll.

== April ==
1 April

Qui Nhơn, South Vietnam's third largest city, 180 kilometres (110 miles) south of Da Nang, was captured by the PAVN. More than one-half of the land area of South Vietnam was now under the control of the PAVN.

Nha Trang was the next objective of the PAVN. General Phú departed Nha Trang secretly by helicopter. Phú had previously promised to defend Nha Trang and had prohibited his soldiers from retreating. He did not inform his men or officers of his departure and order quickly broke down in the city.

The American Consul General in Nha Trang, Moncrieff Spear, ordered the evacuation of American personnel from the city. In the hurried departure, about 100 of the consulate's Vietnamese employees and one of the five Marine Security Guards, Sergeant Michael A. McCormick, were left behind. McCormick was later able to leave Nha Trang on an Air America helicopter.

Cambodian President Lon Nol and his family members fled Cambodia to go into exile in the United States. The Khmer Rouge had conquered most of Cambodia and were poised to capture the capital city of Phnom Penh.

2 April

With the northern part of South Vietnam firmly in the hands of the PAVN after the west-to-east attacks, General Dung ordered most of his soldiers to turn south and drive toward Saigon, still 300 kilometres (190 miles) distant.

3 April

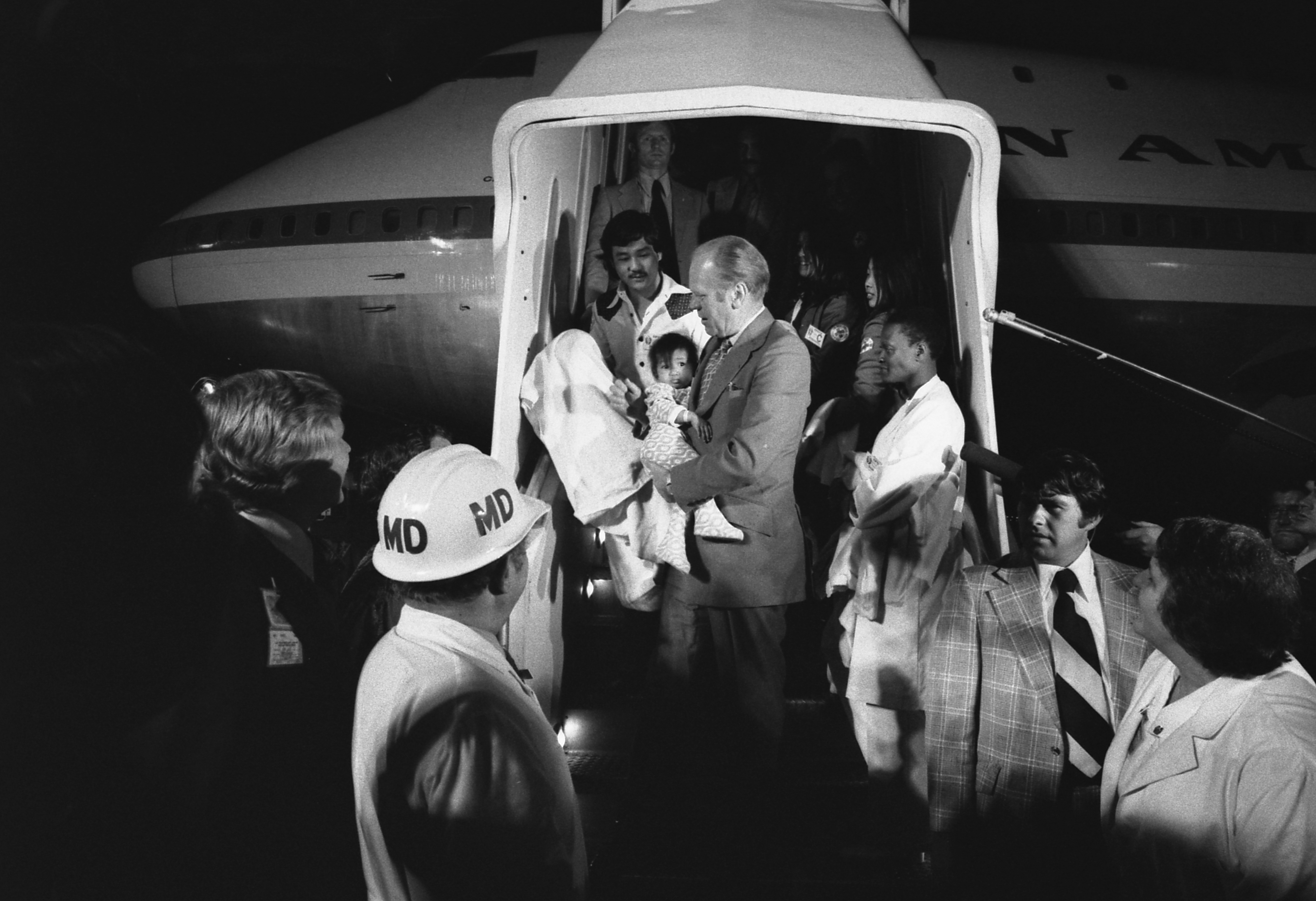
President Ford with an Operation Babylift evacuee

Ford announced Operation Babylift, a plan for the US to bring orphans from South Vietnam to the United States to be adopted by American parents. During the next few weeks, 2,545 Vietnamese children would be flown out of the country of which 1,945 would come to the United States. 51 percent of the children were under 2 years old. 451 of the children were racially mixed, presumably the children of American and other soldiers who had been stationed in Vietnam. Operation Babylift was controversial as critics alleged that not all of the children were orphans and parents had not given their permission for their children to be adopted. There were also criticisms that the children were being removed from their own culture to save them from communist influences.

Weyand met with Thiệu in Saigon. Weyand promised more American aid to South Vietnam, but declined Thiệu's request for a renewal of American bombing of North Vietnamese forces.

South Vietnamese Prime Minister Trần Thiện Khiêm resigned and made preparations to move to Paris, France.

The U.S. Defense Intelligence Agency predicted that South Vietnam would be defeated in 30 days.

4 April

The initial flight of Operation Babylift ended in disaster. The C-5 cargo plane carrying more than 300 persons, including children, escorts and U.S. Air Force crew members crashed near Saigon. 78 Vietnamese children and 50 adults were killed.

The first of two flights by the Royal Australian Air Force (RAAF) took place, in which Vietnamese civilians were evacuated to Bangkok and then to Australia.

Thiệu announced that Prime Minister Trần Thiện Khiêm had been fired.

5 April

Nha Trang was captured with little opposition.

8 April

A Republic of Vietnam Air Force (RVNAF) pilot dropped bombs from his F-5 on the Presidential Palace in Saigon and defected to the North Vietnamese. The bombs did little damage but caused panic in Saigon.

Hearts and Minds won the 1974 Academy Award for Best Documentary Feature. Accepting the award co-producer Bert Schneider said, "It's ironic that we're here at a time just before Vietnam is about to be liberated" and then read a telegram containing "Greetings of Friendship to all American People" from Ambassador Dinh Ba Thi of the VC.

ARVN Major general Nguyễn Văn Hiếu was found shot dead in his office at III Corps headquarters at Bien Hoa Air Base.

9–21 April

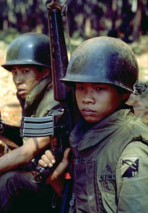
ARVN 18th Division soldiers at Xuân Lộc

The Battle of Xuân Lộc began. Xuân Lộc was a town 80 kilometres (50 mi) east of Saigon. South Vietnam had stationed most of its remaining mobile forces around the town to attempt to halt the drive of the PAVN toward Saigon.

9-29 April

In the Battle of Truong Sa or East Sea Campaign, a naval operation, North Vietnam completed its capture of the South Vietnamese-held Spratly Islands, 400 kilometres (250 miles) off the coast of Vietnam. Following the reunification of Vietnam in 1976, the Spratleys, Trường Sa in Vietnamese, became a part of Khánh Hòa Province.

10 April

Ford requested the U.S. Congress to provide additional aid to South Vietnam: $722 million for military and $250 million for economic aid. Congress declined to act on the President's request and expressed doubt that the aid could arrive in time to be useful—or, in any case, would enable South Vietnam to survive.

=== Evacuation ===
12 April

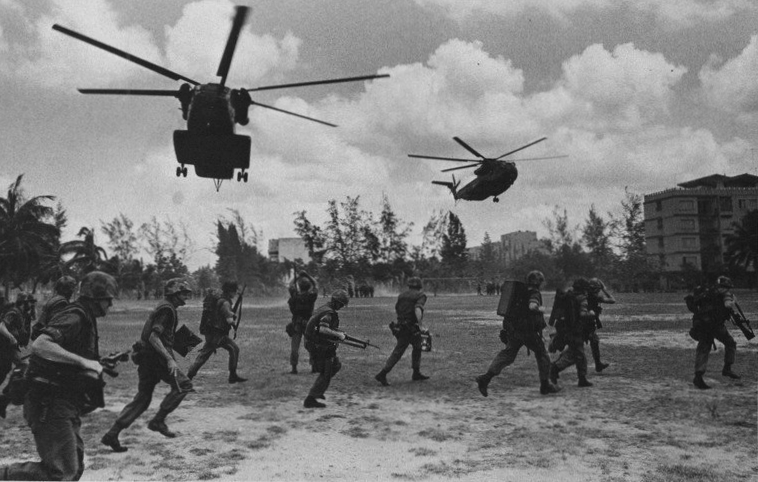
Marines deploying to secure the landing zone for Operation Eagle Pull

The personnel of the American Embassy in Phnom Penh were evacuated in Operation Eagle Pull. Fewer than 300 people were evacuated, including 82 Americans. Several American journalists and other foreigners chose to remain behind.

Many prominent Cambodians chose to remain behind and trust to the mercies of the Khmer Rouge. Deputy Prime Minister Sisowath Sirik Matak said in a letter to the American Ambassador, "I cannot, alas, leave in such a cowardly fashion....I have only committed this mistake of believing in you, the Americans." Sirik Matak was executed a few days later by the Khmer Rouge.

14 April

Two Congressional staff members, Richard Moose and Charles Miessner after visiting South Vietnam released a report stating that "no one including the Vietnamese military believes that more [U.S.] aid could reverse the flow of events." They said that evacuation of Americans from Saigon was being resisted by Ambassador Graham Martin and other senior officials.

16 April

The Foreign Ministry of North Vietnam announced that it would create "no difficulty or obstacles" to a U.S. evacuation of South Vietnam provided it was done "immediately.".

17 April

The Khmer Rouge entered Phnom Penh. Immediately they ordered all the population, swollen to more than 2 million by refugees from the war, to evacuate the city. The Khmer Rouge made no provision for food, shelter, and medical care for the evacuees and thousands died. The evacuated people were resettled in the countryside. Many educated people were summarily executed.

A CIA spy within the inner circles of the North Vietnamese government told the U.S. Embassy in Saigon that North Vietnam would not negotiate but was committed to a military victory over South Vietnam before the end of April.

The second and final flight by the RAAF of Vietnamese civilians to Bangkok took place for a total of 270 people evacuated.

18 April

Ford, over the objections of Ambassador Martin, ordered the evacuation of non-essential American employees of the U.S. in South Vietnam. Martin feared that a U.S. evacuation would undermine confidence in the South Vietnamese government, cause panic, and possibly incite violence against Americans. Ford also created on this date the Interagency Task Force on Indochinese Refugees to evacuate Americans and Vietnamese from South Vietnam.

Secretary of State Henry Kissinger met with the USSR Ambassador to the United States, Anatoly Dobrynin. He presented a letter from Ford requesting the Soviets to use their influence with North Vietnam to seek a cease fire in South Vietnam. In exchange, the US promised to withdraw from South Vietnam, cut off aid, and convene peace talks in Paris. Kissinger also warned that any North Vietnamese attacks against Saigon or Tan Son Nhat International Airport or interference with the U.S. withdrawal would cause a "most dangerous situation."

19 April

With the battle of Xuân Lộc nearly over and going in favor of North Vietnam, CIA director William Colby told the President that "South Vietnam faces total defeat - and soon."

21 April

The Battle of Xuân Lộc concluded with the ARVN retreating toward Saigon. Unlike earlier battles of the Spring Offensive, the ARVN had put up a vigorous resistance to the PAVN. Xuân Lộc was to be the last major battle of the Vietnam War. The PAVN now controlled 2/3 of the territory of the country.

Thiệu resigned, leaving the government in the hands of Vice President Trần Văn Hương. In his 2-hour resignation speech, Thiệu criticized the U.S. for not keeping its promises to Vietnam. He departed Vietnam in exile a few days later. In response to Thiệu's resignation, Kissinger said that Thiệu's resignation "in all probability will lead to some form of negotiation" to save Saigon. However, all efforts to negotiate with North Vietnam proved fruitless.

After a systematic evacuation of staff and dependents by the Royal New Zealand Air Force beginning two weeks prior, the last New Zealanders, including Ambassador Norman Farrell, were evacuated from the New Zealand Embassy in Saigon.

22 April

The new President of South Vietnam, Trần Văn Hương, proposed a ceasefire in the fighting and negotiations between the South and the North. However, on this same day, General Dung finalized his plans to conquer Saigon and issued orders to begin the operation. The ARVN had approximately 60,000 soldiers to defend the city. Dung's plan, with 130,000 soldiers, was to advance with tanks and mechanized forces toward Saigon along main highways and capture key objectives in and around the city.

The U.S. Department of Justice approved the entry into the United States of up to 130,000 Vietnamese refugees to be evacuated from South Vietnam.

23 April

In a speech at Tulane University Ford declared that the war "is finished as far as America is concerned."

In Saigon the evacuation of Americans and Vietnamese accelerated with two military transport airplanes per hour arriving at Tan Son Nhut airport and 7,000 people per day being flown out of the country. The great majority of the Vietnamese evacuees were taken to Guam where they would be housed and processed for entry into the United States or other countries under Operation New Life.

24 April

A large U.S. Navy taskforce assembled off the coast of South Vietnam to assist in the evacuation. The ships of the task force would be the destination for those evacuated from Saigon by helicopter and the tens of thousands of South Vietnamese who were fleeing in private boats, barges and Republic of Vietnam Navy vessels.

25 April

The U.S. Embassy in Saigon decided that, to signal "Evacuation Day" for all Americans, the Defense Attaché Office (DAO) radio station would broadcast the phrase "the temperature is 105 degrees and rising" followed by playing Bing Crosby's recording of the song "White Christmas".

The last Australians including Ambassador Geoffrey Price of the Australian Embassy in Saigon were evacuated by the RAAF.

26 April

The assault on Saigon began with a PAVN bombardment of Bien Hoa Air Base 30 kilometres (19 miles) northeast of Saigon. Biên Hòa was the largest airbase in South Vietnam. It was quickly abandoned by South Vietnamese forces.

27 April

The first PAVN rockets fell in downtown Saigon, killing 6 people.

President Hương resigned as President of South Vietnam. That evening the National Assembly named Dương Văn Minh as president and gave him the job of "seeking ways and means to restore peace to South Vietnam."

28 April

In the early afternoon, several RVNAF helicopters launched a counterattack to clear away the VC troops who attempted to occupy Newport Bridge to block the route between Saigon and Bien Hoa. Then, ARVN soldiers rushed to Newport Bridge to keep the bridge secure. At the end of the day, most of ARVN soldiers managed to clear the bridge and captured several fighting VC units at the hideout.

President Dương Văn Minh made an inauguration presidential speech about the struggle of the South Vietnam military and finding ways for the peace to end the war with North Vietnam and PRG. He ordered all remaining ARVN units, including in the Mekong Delta, to protect the remaining territories and keep resistance as long as possible until an order from ceasefire. He reminded Saigon citizens to stay in South Vietnam and promise a new ceasefire with the PRG to keep Republic of Vietnam alive and separate.

At 17:30 Tan Son Nhut Air Base was bombed by Vietnam People's Air Force pilots flying captured RVNAF A-37 jets. With the runway damaged the refugee evacuation by fixed wing aircraft was interrupted.

In Cần Thơ, U.S consul Francis Terry McNamara met for the final time with Major General Nguyễn Khoa Nam about the plans to evacuate U.S consulate employees, some American civilians and even some Vietnamese employees by boat. General Nam didn't want any active ARVN military-aged men to evacuate with the Americans.

29 April

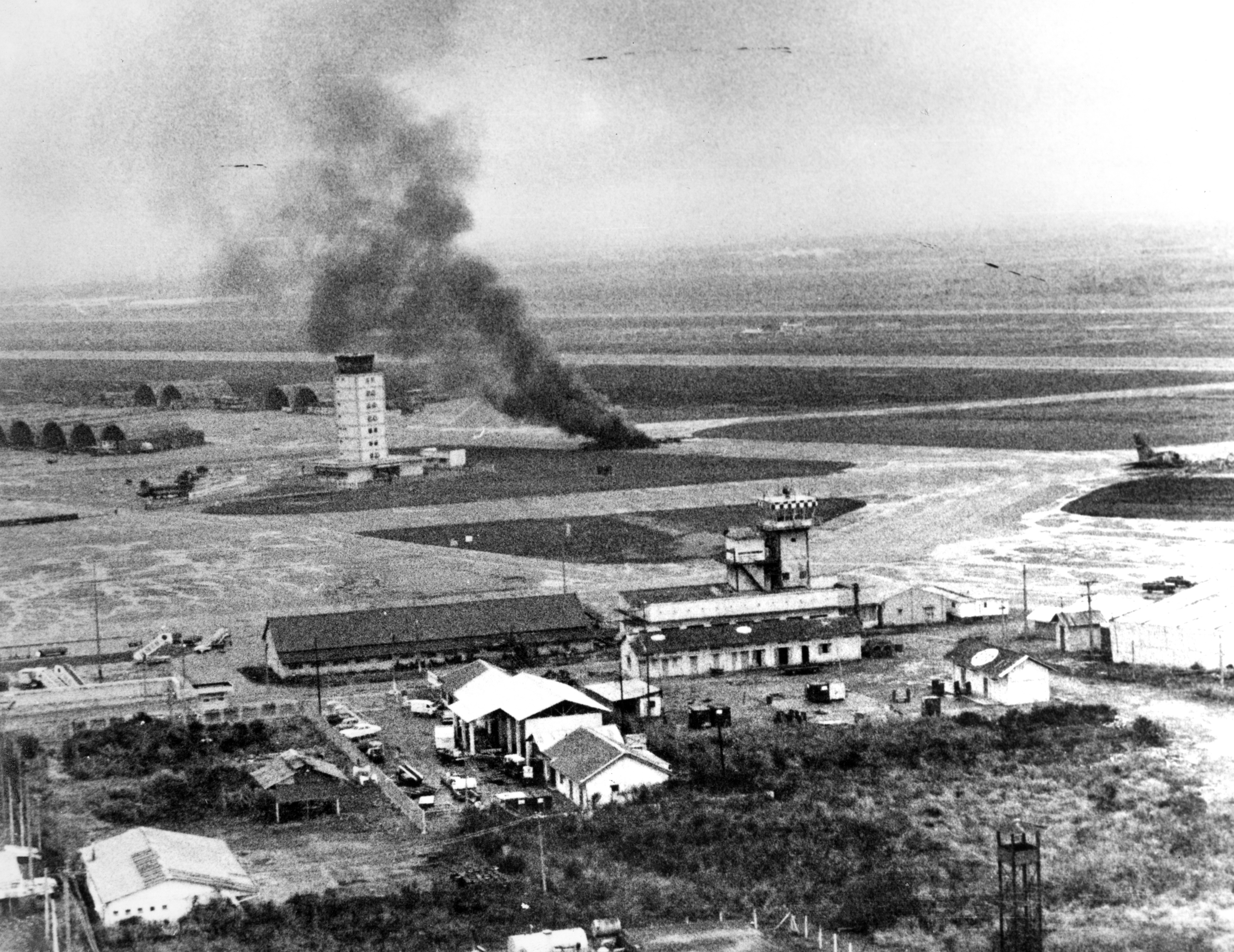
PAVN rocket attack on Tan Son Nhut

Rocket attacks by PAVN forces on Tan Son Nhut airport began at 03:58 hours and killed Marines Charles McMahon and Darwin Judge the last two U.S. servicemen killed in combat in Vietnam at the DAO Compound.

Offshore to assist with the evacuation were five U.S. aircraft carriers and more than 30 other U.S. navy ships. Tens of thousands of South Vietnamese attempted to evacuate South Vietnam by small boats and barges. By day's end, one of the U.S. ships had crowded more than 10,000 refugees on board and had been forced to refuse boarding to passengers of 70 or 80 other boats nearby.

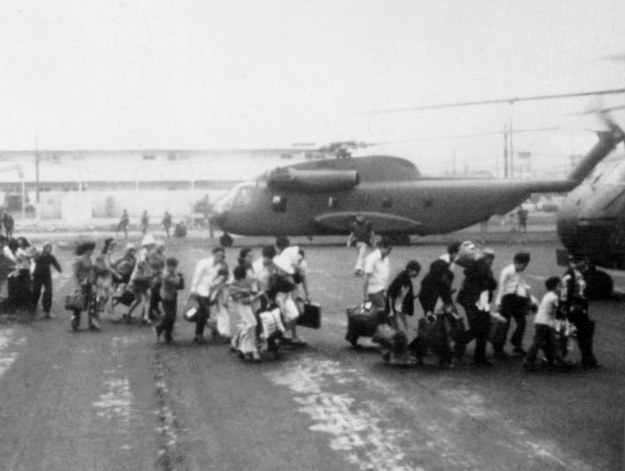
Evacuation from the DAO Compound

After a visit to Tan Son Nhut airport, Martin and General Homer D. Smith, the highest ranking U.S. military officer in Vietnam, agreed that the situation was too dangerous to continue evacuating Americans and Vietnamese by fixed wing aircraft. Instead, a helicopter evacuation, dubbed Operation Frequent Wind, would begin immediately. The first evacuation by helicopter was at approximately 10:00, although large-scale evacuation by helicopter did not begin until 15:00.

By late afternoon, a mob of several thousand Vietnamese ringed the U.S. Embassy in downtown Saigon. Marine guards prevented them from climbing over the fence. Inside the Embassy compound were two to three thousand people, mostly Vietnamese, awaiting evacuation. This was far more people that the U.S. had anticipated evacuating from the Embassy and the Marine Corps commander of the helicopter evacuation assigned many additional helicopters to the evacuation. However, only one helicopter at a time could land at the Embassy in the parking lot and on the roof. After nightfall, wind and rain reduced visibility and made the helicopter landings hazardous. Embassy personnel set up a slide projector on the roof. The beam of light from the projector illuminated the landing area.

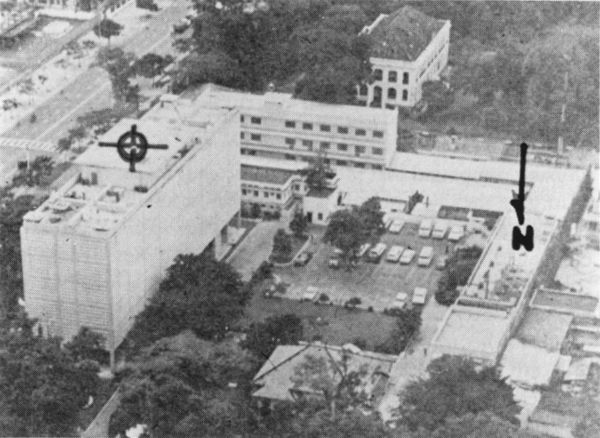
The U.S. Embassy in Saigon. Evacuation was from the rooftop and the parking lot. The trees were chopped down to permit the helicopters to land in the parking lot.

Meanwhile, at the DAO compound, 5 kilometres (3.1 miles) from the Embassy, evacuation by helicopter was also proceeding, although weather conditions and tracer rounds made the operation hazardous. At 20:15 General Smith boarded the last evacuation helicopter from the compound. The operation had evacuated more than 6,000 people, including more than 5,000 Vietnamese, by more than 100 helicopter sorties during the day. Meanwhile, the helicopter evacuation from the Embassy continued.

About 22:00, Martin at the Embassy, hearing that Washington planned to halt the evacuation cabled the State Department: "I need 30 CH-53s [helicopters] and I need them now.

Hubert van Es a Dutch photographer and photojournalist took the photo showing South Vietnamese civilians scrambling to the rooftop of 22 Gia Long Street to board an Air America helicopter.

In the Mekong Delta, the situation in Can Tho and other Mekong provinces started to deteriorate. Although the VC launched small attacks outside of Cần Thơ, the city remained calm with the presence of ARVN 21st Division protecting the defensive line. The last diplomatic outpost of the U.S. outside Saigon was Cần Thơ. At noon, despairing of other options for evacuation, Consul General Francis McNamara assembled more than 300 U.S. Filipino and Vietnamese employees of the U.S. government and loaded them on a barge and two landing craft and, under fire, set off down the river and out to South China Sea. McNamara wore a helmet that declared he was the "Commodore, Can Tho Yacht Club." The group was picked up by a ship at 01:00 the next morning. As of 29 April the PAVN/VC hadn't launched any attacks on 16 Mekong provinces.

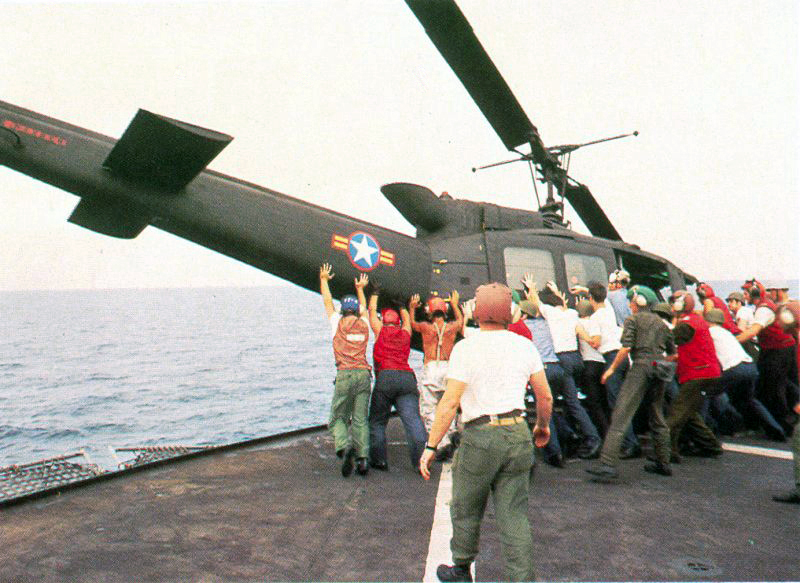
An RVNAF UH-1 is pushed overboard from USS Midway.

30 April

Helicopter evacuations of Vietnamese and Americans continued from the Embassy until 03:45. However, there were still about 420 Vietnamese and other non-Americans left inside the Embassy compound. Two additional helicopters were dispatched with the pilots instructed by Ford that only Americans were to be evacuated. Martin and his staff were to board the first of the helicopters and the remaining American staff were to leave on the second helicopter. Additional helicopters were then sent to evacuate the Marine guards, under the command of Major James Kean, with the last eleven leaving the Embassy at 07:53. Master Sergeant Juan Valdez was the last Marine to board the last helicopter out of Saigon. The 420 people awaiting evacuation were abandoned. Twenty-five years of U.S. military involvement in South Vietnam had ended.

Around 07:30, ARVN soldiers held at the Newport Bridge to prevent the PAVN advance. At 10:24 President Minh announced on the radio the surrender of South Vietnam. An ARVN major who attempt to blow up Newport Bridge by electrical detonator later abandoned the plan, ending major resistance. At 10:30 PAVN soldiers and tanks crossed the Newport Bridge without any resistance and moved into the city.

About noon and almost unopposed, a column of PAVN tanks and armored vehicles advanced into downtown Saigon. A tank crashed through the gate of the Presidential Palace. Inside, Minh awaited the arrival of the North Vietnamese and surrendered. The ARVN soldiers had mostly abandoned their posts and the remainder of Saigon was captured with little opposition.

The new communist government announced that Saigon had been renamed Ho Chi Minh City.

According to radio broadcast from Bangkok, several Mekong provincial capitals refused to surrender to the VC shortly after Minh ordered central government and ARVN forces ceased to exist. The next day, the remnants of Mekong provincial capitals dissolved.

On Phu Quoc Island, ARVN soldiers and Republic of Vietnam Navy sailors fought against superior VC units near the pier in Duong Dong until Minh's surrender broadcast. The soldiers and sailors later surrendered to VC at the navy pier to avoid further bloodshed.

In Cần Thơ, Brigadier General Lê Văn Hưng, a hero of the Battle of An Loc, committed suicide at 20:45 after farewelling the remaining ARVN soldiers and his family. General Hung was one of five ARVN generals who refused to surrender to VC and committed suicide.

Southwest of Saigon in Dinh Tuong Province, General Trần Văn Hai poisoned himself and died in Dong Tam Base Camp, when the VC representatives met several ARVN soldiers demanding the base handed over on the next morning of 1 May.

== May ==
1 May

The last remaining ARVN soldiers in Can Tho surrendered to VC on the early morning shortly after Major General Nguyen Khoa Nam committed suicide at his military headquarters. General Nam was one of three ARVN generals in Mekong Delta refused to be evacuated by Americans prior to South Vietnam surrendered.

Khmer Rouge forces landed on Phú Quốc which was claimed by Cambodia but controlled by South Vietnam.

5 May

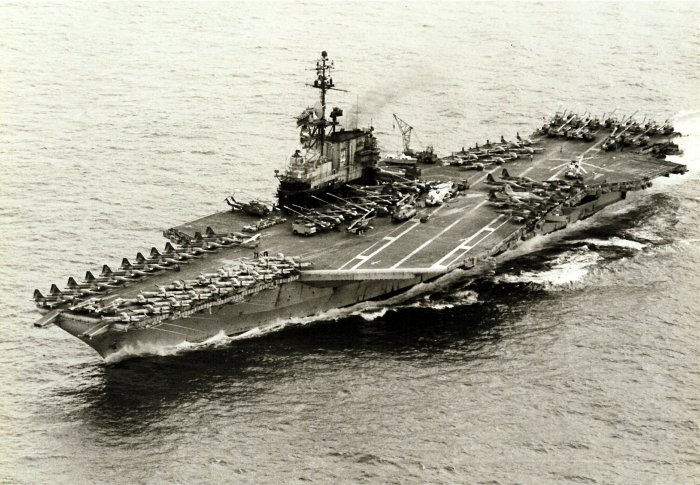
USS Midway transporting 101 ex-RVNAF aircraft from Thailand to Guam, May 1975

General Vang Pao, a Hmong highlander, was ordered by the Prime Minister of Laos to cease resistance to the Pathet Lao. Vang Pao resigned instead.

101 ex-RVNAF aircraft at U-Tapao Royal Thai Navy Airfield were loaded aboard the USS Midway which evacuated 27 A-37s, 3 CH-47s, 25 F-5Es and 45 UH-1Hs. A further 41 aircraft were flown to the U.S. while 54 aircraft were transferred to the Thai Government, these comprised: 1 A-37, 17 C-47s, 1 F-5B, 12 O-1s, 14 U-17s and 9 UH-1Hs.

8 May

A few journalists and other foreigners had remained behind when the U.S. evacuated Phnom Penh. They were driven to the border with Thailand and expelled. The journalists reported that Phnom Penh was an empty city, except for Khmer Rouge soldiers, and that the country was a wasteland of ruins and abandoned towns and cities. Cambodia had become a land of silence with not even the names of its new rulers known to the outside world.

10 May

Khmer Rouge captured the Thổ Chu Islands, where they evacuated and later executed 500 Vietnamese civilians. The PAVN launched a counterattack evicting the Khmer Rouge from Phú Quốc and Thổ Chu and attacked Cambodia's Poulo Wai island.

12 May

Khmer Rouge forces seized the U.S. merchant vessel SS Mayaguez in the Gulf of Thailand, apparently without the knowledge of the central government of Cambodia.

13 May

The Pathet Lao and their North Vietnamese allies in Laos broke through the defense lines of the Hmong army headquartered in Long Tieng, "the most secret place on earth." " CIA agent Jerry Daniels organized an air evacuation of Vang Pao and about 2,000 Hmong, mostly soldiers and their families to Thailand.

15 May

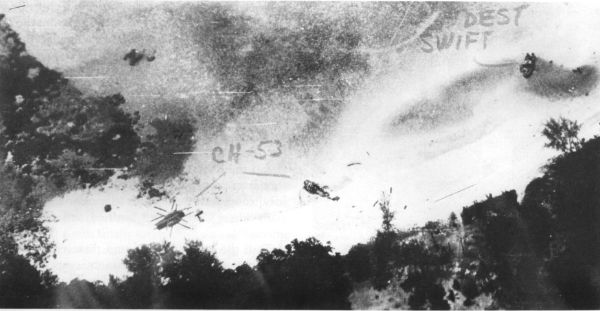
Two CH-53s shot down and a destroyed Khmer Rouge Swift Boat at Koh Tang during the Mayaguez Incident

U.S. forces re-captured the Mayaguez and rescued its crew. The U.S. launched retaliatory air strikes against targets in Cambodia and landed Marines on Koh Tang island. The Marines encountered heavy resistance and 18 were killed before their withdrawal. Twenty-three additional Americans were killed in a helicopter crash during the operation.

23 May

Most American employees of the U.S. Embassy in Laos were ordered to evacuate the country. Most were evacuated by air to Bangkok, Thailand. A skeleton staff remained at the Embassy.

== June ==
In mid-June Vietnam attacked Poulo Wai and fought the Khmer Rouge before withdrawing in August and recognising it as Kampuchean territory.

8 June

Võ Văn Ba, the most important South Vietnamese spy within the Vietcong who was captured at the end of April, died in North Vietnamese captivity by apparent suicide.

== August ==
23 August

The King of Laos Sisavang Vatthana abdicated the throne, he would later die in Pathet Lao captivity. The Pathet Lao were already in control of the country.

== October ==
30 October

James Lewis a CIA agent captured near Phan Rang Air Base on 16 April 1975 and 13 other US citizens captured during the 1975 Spring Offensive were transported by a UN-chartered C-47 from Hanoi to Vientiane, Laos and then on to Bangkok, Thailand.

== December ==
2 December

The Lao People's Democratic Republic was officially established.33
