= 1973 in the Vietnam War =

← 1972 1974 →
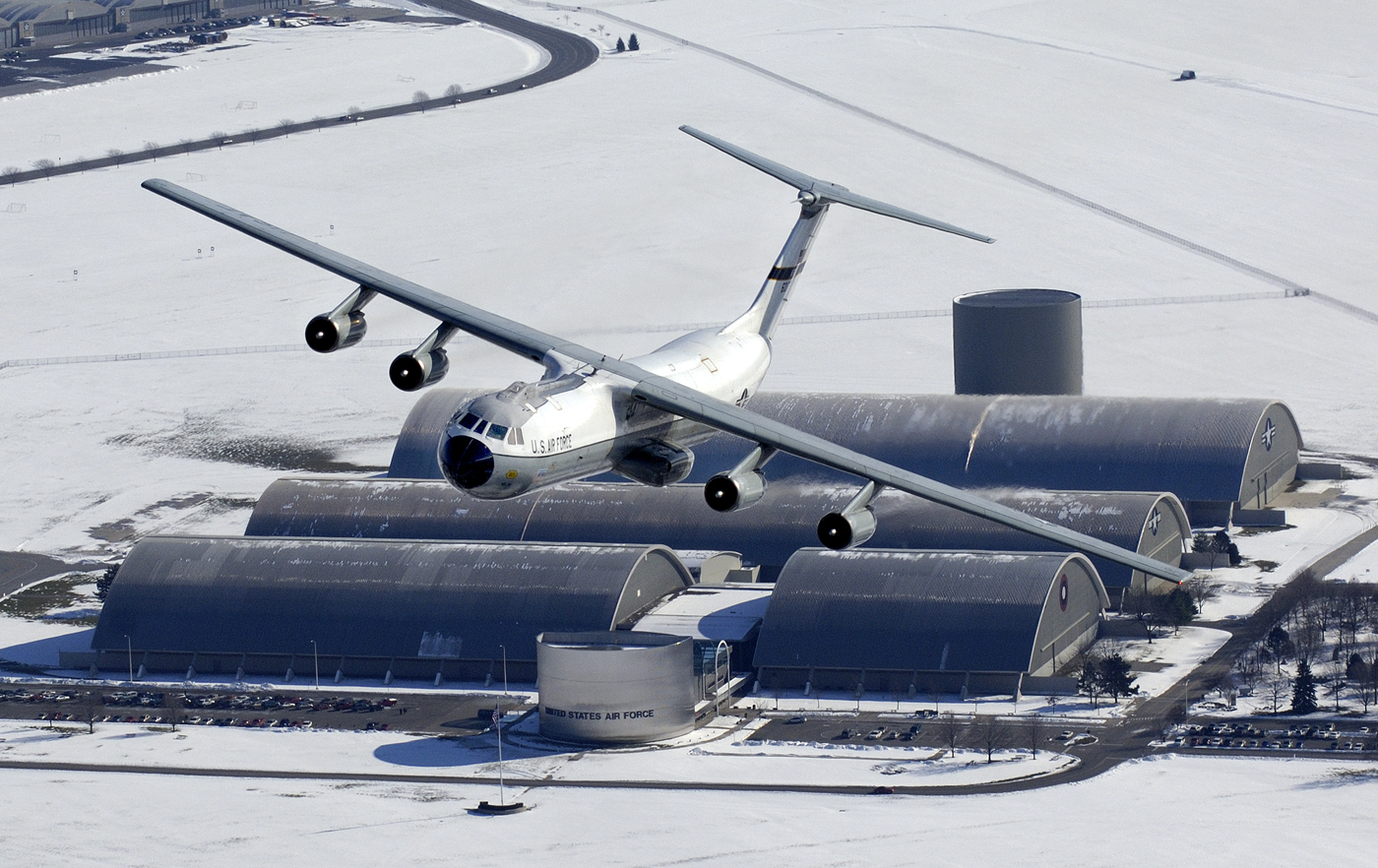
- Hanoi Taxi, the plane used to bring home American POWs from Hanoi
Location	Indochina

Belligerents
Anti-Communist forces: South Vietnam; United States (until 29 March); South Korea (until 23 March) (Cambodia) Khmer Republic; Kingdom of Laos	Communist forces: North Vietnam (Provisional Revolutionary Government of the Republic of South Vietnam) Viet Cong (Cambodia) Khmer Rouge (Laos) Pathet Lao; China; Soviet Union

Strength
US: ~24,000 reduced to 0 (by March 29)	

Casualties and losses
South Vietnam: 27,901 killed US: 68 killed	U.S. estimate: ~39,000 PAVN/VC killed

1973 in the Vietnam War began with a peace agreement, the Paris Peace Accords, signed by the United States and South Vietnam on one side of the Vietnam War and communist North Vietnam and the insurgent Viet Cong on the other. Although honored in some respects, the peace agreement was violated by both North and South Vietnam as the struggle for power and control of territory in South Vietnam continued. North Vietnam released all American prisoners of war and the United States completed its military withdrawal from South Vietnam.

U.S. Congressional opposition to the Vietnam War forced the U.S. to cease bombing communist forces in Cambodia in August and in November Congress adopted the War Powers Resolution which limited the U.S. President's authority to wage war.

== January ==
1 January

At midday, following a 36-hour New Year ceasefire, U.S. aircraft resumed airstrikes across South Vietnam and North Vietnam up to the 20th parallel north. South Vietnam reported 49 ceasefire violations resulting in 44 People's Army of Vietnam (PAVN)/Vietcong (VC), eight South Vietnamese military and three civilians killed, the most serious incident being PAVN artillery firing 300 rounds against Republic of Vietnam Airborne Division positions 3 miles (4.8 km) southwest of Quảng Trị.

2 January

The Democratic Party members of the United States House of Representatives voted 154 to 75 to cut off U.S. funds for the war in Vietnam once all U.S. forces were withdrawn and U.S. Prisoners of war (POWs) were released. As President Richard Nixon and most Republicans opposed the cutoff, the vote had only symbolic impact.

The Pentagon acknowledged for the first time that Bạch Mai Hospital and Gia Lam Airport in Hanoi had been accidentally damaged during December's Operation Linebacker II bombing raids, but without clarifying if the damage was caused by bombing, falling debris or antiaircraft weapons.

In Cambodia Khmer Rouge forces captured two Khmer National Armed Forces (FANK) positions on Route 3, 24 miles (39 km) southwest of Phnom Penh, while FANK forces repelled a 36-hour Khmer Rouge/PAVN assault on Prey Totung, 10 miles (16 km) from Phnom Penh International Airport losing 20 killed.

3 January

U.S. aircraft continued to bomb North Vietnam below the 20th parallel, with 84 strikes by fighter-bombers and 13 flights of three B-52s each. 229 airstrikes were conducted over South Vietnam and 22 B-52 strikes were conducted near the Vietnamese Demilitarized Zone (DMZ). PAVN/VC forces increased attacks across South Vietnam and shelled Bien Hoa Air Base killing three civilians.

A Khmer Rouge/PAVN rocket attack on Phnom Penh International Airport and a nearby refugee camp killed three civilians and wounded more than 300, while two FANK positions 11 miles (18 km) and 17 miles (27 km) south of Phnom Penh were overrun by Khmer Rouge/PAVN forces.

In Beijing, Chinese leader Zhou Enlai told North Vietnam's peace negotiator, Lê Đức Thọ, that "the U.S. effort to exert pressure through bombing has failed." He advised Tho to be flexible in peace negotiations with the Americans and to "let them leave as quickly as possible" and wait for the situation to change.

4 January

South Vietnamese military spokesmen said that PAVN/VC attacks had risen to their highest level since October 1972 when a ceasefire agreement was expected to go into effect, with 116 incidents across the country, including 22 PAVN/VC and eight South Vietnamese militia were reported killed in fighting at Truong Luu in Tây Ninh province. 293 South Vietnamese, 1,288 PAVN/VC and five U.S. military personnel were reported to have been killed in the preceding week.

North Vietnam reported that 1,318 people had been killed and 1,261 wounded in the Linebacker II raids on Hanoi.

The Democratic members of the United States Senate followed the lead of the Democrats in the House of Representatives in voting 36 to 12 to cut off funds for the Vietnam War once all U.S. military forces were withdrawn and the POWs released.

5 January

South Vietnam reported 97 attacks throughout the country, but U.S. sources described them as "small in scale and significance." ARVN Airborne forces killed 24 PAVN and captured one for the loss of two killed in fighting in the foothills west of Quảng Trị. Vietnamese Rangers and militia killed 39 PAVN in the Central Highlands west of Route 14. 116 fighter-bomber and 15 B-52 flights struck North Vietnam, while 229 fight-bomber and 14 B-52 strikes were conducted over South Vietnam along with 176 sorties by Republic of Vietnam Air Force (RVNAF) aircraft.

At a bipartisan breakfast meeting with Congressional leaders, Nixon said that he was neither optimistic nor pessimistic regarding the peace negotiations and would do what he regarded as necessary to secure "a proper kind of settlement."

Canada's Secretary of State for External Affairs, Mitchell Sharp, said he found it difficult to understand the reason for the U.S. Christmas bombing and that "we deplore the action."

Nixon wrote a letter to President Nguyễn Văn Thiệu of South Vietnam asking for Thiệu's cooperation in the Paris peace negotiations and stating that "the unity of our two countries...would be gravely jeopardized if you persist in your present course." Thiệu had scuttled a draft peace agreement reached in October 1972. Nixon pledged to respond with "full force" if North Vietnam violated the peace agreement.

An attempt by two FANK battalions to relieve the besieged town of Tram Khnar was repulsed with heavy losses reported.

6 January

As U.S. National Security Adviser Henry Kissinger prepared to resume peace talks with North Vietnam in Paris, Nixon told him that "almost any settlement would be tolerable." Nixon expressed willingness to accept the draft agreement of October 1972 with a few cosmetic changes to make it appear the U.S. had gained something in the negotiations.

45 B-52s and 115 U.S. fighter-bombers hit targets in North Vietnam many around Vinh and Đồng Hới.

FANK troops succeeded in recapturing Tram Khnar.

8 January

United States Air Force (USAF) crewmen Captain Paul Howman and First lieutenant Lawrence Kullman, scored the last U.S. aerial victory of the war shooting down a Vietnam People's Air Force MiG-21 with their F-4D Phantom.

Five U.S. jets accidentally bombed Da Nang Air Base destroying three fuel tanks, damaging seven aircraft and injuring ten Americans and one South Vietnamese.

9 January

Kissinger and Le Duc Tho in Paris achieved a "breakthrough" in the peace talks with the main obstacle remaining the opposition of the South Vietnamese government to the agreement.

11 January

With most details of a peace agreement worked out, Kissinger and Tho reached secret agreements regarding cease fires in both South Vietnam and Laos, the release of American POWs and political prisoners in South Vietnam and the partial withdrawal of North Vietnamese forces from South Vietnam.

The Governor General of Australia Paul Hasluck proclaimed the cessation of hostilities in South Vietnam by Australian forces.

14 January

Nixon wrote a letter to Thiệu which was delivered in Saigon by military adviser Alexander Haig. Nixon said he was "irrevocably" committed to sign the peace agreement and said he would do so "alone, if necessary." The consequences if Thiệu did not sign the agreement would be a cutoff in American military and economic aid. Nixon pledged to "react strongly in the event the agreement is violated" by North Vietnam and to continue aid to South Vietnam if Thiệu cooperated."

15 January

All bombing of North Vietnam by the United States was halted and would not be resumed.

17 January

Thiệu responded to Nixon's letter with a long list of objections to the draft peace agreement, most importantly the fact that the withdrawal of all PAVN forces from South Vietnam was not required.

18 January - 21 February

Operation Phou Phiang III was the final offensive of the Royal Lao Army (RLA) in the Laotian Civil War. The RLA attacked PAVN positions on the Plain of Jars but failed to evict them before the ceasefire mandated by the Vientiane Treaty came into effect on 21 February.

20 January

Nixon responded to Thiệu's objections to the draft peace agreement. He attempted to reassure Thiệu on the issue of PAVN soldiers in South Vietnam. He repeated that he would sign the agreement whether or not Thiệu agreed.

21 January

Thiệu notified the U.S. government that he would sign the Paris Peace Accords on behalf of South Vietnam.

Knowing that the peace agreement called for a cease fire in place, Thiệu ordered his armed forces to regain as much territory as possible prior to the ceasefire agreement. South Vietnamese forces established forward posts in communist-controlled areas to bolster their claim to the surrounding land. This was the beginning of what was called the War of the flags.

22 January

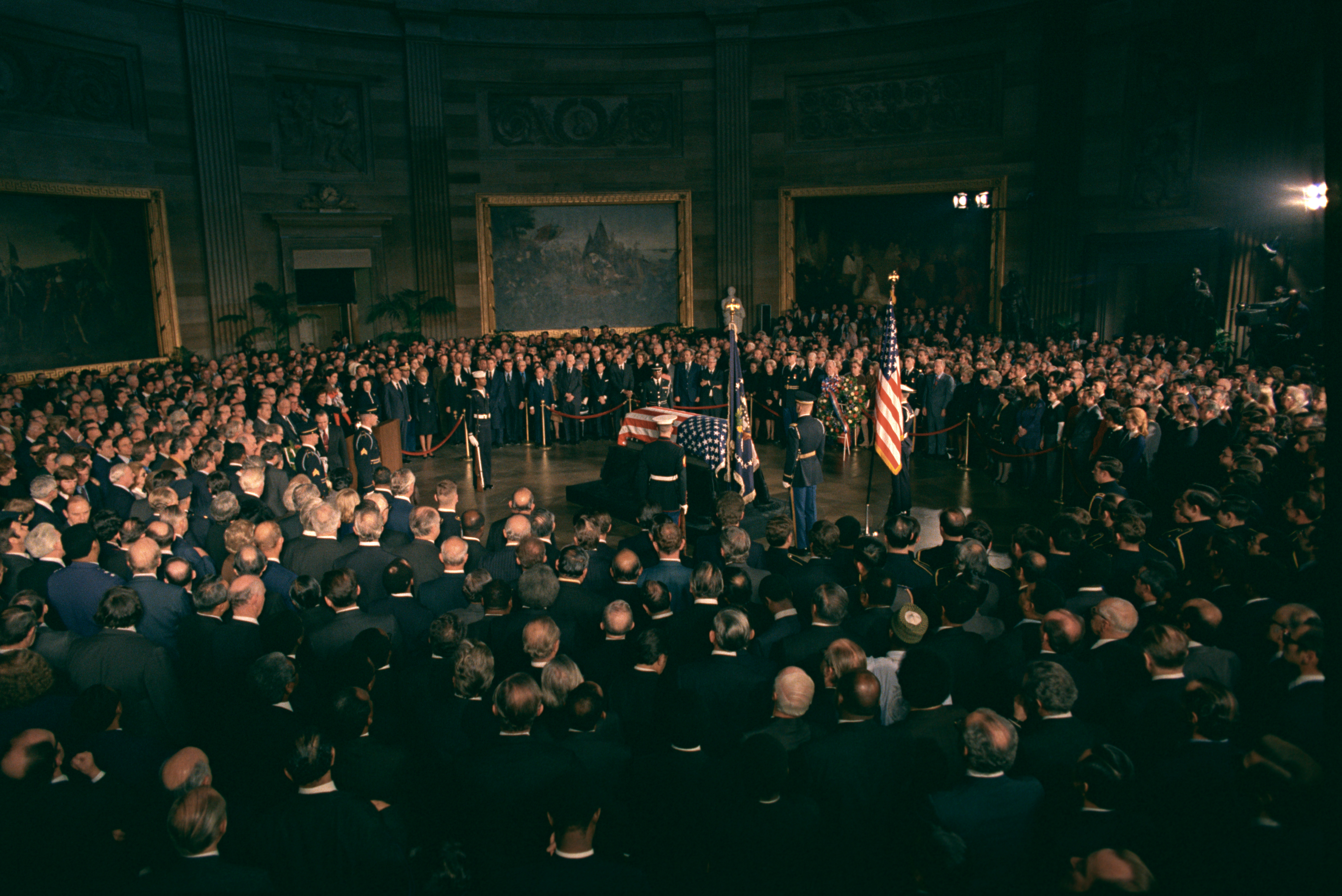
Lyndon Johnson lies in state at the Capitol Rotunda

Former U.S. president Lyndon B. Johnson, whose presidency was marred by the Vietnam War, died.

23 January

Nixon announced that a peace agreement had been reached in Paris which would end the Vietnam War and "bring peace with honor."

26 January

With the knowledge that the Paris Peace agreement called for a cease fire in place, PAVN/VC troops in South Vietnam attacked 400 villages attempting to expand their area of control before the cease fire took effect. Both North and South Vietnam struggled to gain control of more territory during the "land grab." Within two weeks South Vietnam had regained control of all but 23 of the villages.

PAVN rockets damaged two United States Marine Corps (USMC) F-4s as they rearmed at Da Nang Air Base.

26–31 January

In the Battle of Cửa Việt, South Vietnamese forces attempted to recapture the Cửa Việt Base and its vicinity, in northeast Quảng Trị Province. While initially successful, the PAVN eventually forced them to retreat with heavy losses in armored vehicles. Two U.S. aircraft were shot down while supporting the battle, resulting in one captured and three missing.

27 January

The Paris Peace Accords, formally titled the "Agreement on Ending the War and Restoring Peace in Vietnam", intended to halt the fighting between North and South Vietnam and end U.S. military involvement in the war were signed in Paris. The governments of the Democratic Republic of Vietnam (North Vietnam), the Republic of Vietnam (South Vietnam) and the United States, as well as the Provisional Revolutionary Government (PRG) that represented the VC signed the agreement. The U.S. agreed to withdraw its remaining military personnel from South Vietnam within 60 days. North Vietnam agreed to a ceasefire and to return all American prisoners of war. North Vietnam was permitted to leave 150,000 soldiers and to retain the territory it controlled in South Vietnam.

The U.S. and North Vietnam also pledged to withdraw their military forces from Laos and Cambodia and cease military operations there.

The ceasefire was observed in some areas, but South Vietnamese troops still fought to regain control of villages captured by PAVN/VC forces the day before.

Lieutenant Colonel William B. Nolde was killed near An Lộc, the last American soldier to die prior to the ceasefire envisioned in the Paris Peace Accords.

United States Secretary of Defense Melvin Laird announced that the draft of young American men into military service would be ended. A few men continued to be drafted until June 30, 1973, when the federal government's authority to induct expired.

27 January - 16 February

The PAVN 141st Regiment captured Sa Huỳnh Base in southern Quảng Ngãi Province. Despite the ceasefire coming into effect, given its strategic location the ARVN 2nd Division launched a series of counterattacks, forcing the PAVN out of Sa Huỳnh by 16 February 1973.

28 January

North Vietnam celebrated the signing of the Paris Peace Accords as a victory. "The Vietnamese revolution has achieved several important gains, but the struggle of our people must continue to consolidate those victories [to] build a peaceful, unified, independent, democratic, and strong Vietnam." The U.S. media praised Nixon and Kissinger for their achievement of "peace with honor." In South Vietnam few believed that the agreement would lead to a lasting peace.

30 January

Elliot Richardson replaces Melvin Laird as U.S. Secretary of Defense.

31 January

Reports from American military advisers in the countryside of South Vietnam reported "ceasefire or no, operations are continuing much as before" and "with the support of daily air strikes and heavy artillery barrages they [the South Vietnamese military forces] have finally begun to roll the VC back" and more Republic of Vietnam Air Force (RVNAF) tactical air "strikes were flown in Lam Dong in the three days after the ceasefire than had been flown in the previous six months."

Balance of Military Forces (late January 1973)
South Vietnamese Armed Forces
Combat regulars	210,000
Regional and Popular Force militias	510,000
Service troops	200,000
Total: South Vietnamese armed forces		920,000
Communist armed forces
PAVN regulars (in South Vietnam)	123,000
Viet Cong	25,000
Service troops	71,000
Total: Communist armed forces		219,000

== February ==
1 February

The U.S. and North Vietnam began implementing the secret portions of the Paris Peace Accords. North Vietnam handed over a list of 10 names of U.S. military and civilians who were prisoners in Laos. The U.S. said in response that it had records for 317 unaccounted for personnel. The U.S. had promised $3.25 billion in aid to North Vietnam in exchange for cooperation in determining the fate of missing and unaccounted for Americans.

3 February

The Khmer Rouge cut the highway link between the capital Phnom Penh and the country's only deep-water port, Kompong Som. Henceforth, the principal route for supplies to reach Phnom Penh would be the Mekong River from Saigon.

5 February

Baron 52 a USAF EC-47Q was shot down on an electronic intelligence mission over Salavan Province, Laos killing all eight crewmen.

6 February - 27 July

Operation End Sweep to demine North Vietnamese harbors, coastline and inland waterways began.

9 February

With the Khmer Rouge closing in on Phnom Penh, the United States resumed bombing of North Vietnamese military bases and supply routes (the Ho Chi Minh Trail) in Cambodia. The ceasefire in North and South Vietnam did not apply to Cambodia and Laos. Over the next six months the U.S. would drop a larger tonnage of bombs on Cambodia than on Japan in World War II.

10 February

Kissinger visited Hanoi and met with Prime Minister of North Vietnam Pham Van Dong. The two men discussed the implementation of the U.S. aid program for Vietnam and the establishment of diplomatic relations between the U.S. and North Vietnam.

12 February

Operation Homecoming resulted in the repatriation of 591 American prisoners of war held by North Vietnam. Three C-141A transports flew to Hanoi and one C-9A aircraft was sent to Saigon to pick up released prisoners of war. The first flight of 40 U.S. prisoners of war left Hanoi in a C-141A, later known as the "Hanoi Taxi" and now in a museum. From February 12 to April 4, there were 54 C-141 missions flying out of Hanoi, bringing the former POWs home.

21 February

In Laos the government and the Pathet Lao signed a cease fire agreement, the Vientiane Treaty. The agreement was violated frequently, but by the end of April most fighting had ceased.

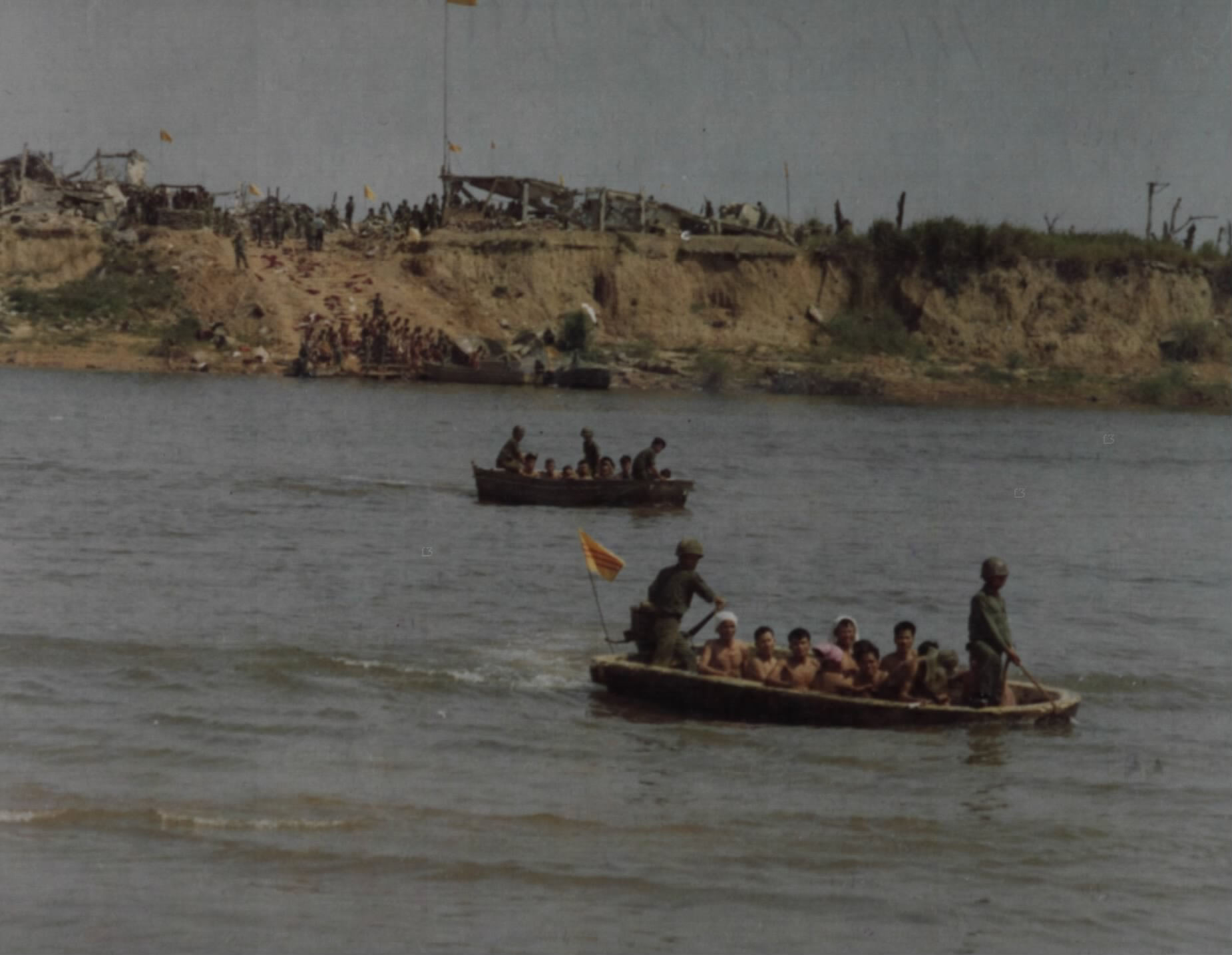
PAVN prisoner release, Thach Han River, 24 February

26 February

The International Guarantee Conference, set up to supervise the Paris Peace Accords, took place in Paris. The principal issue was violations of the in-place ceasefire called for in the accord. The PRG representative accused the South Vietnam of "thousands" of military sweeps to take control of additional areas; the South Vietnamese representative charged the VC with 4,595 violations of the ceasefire.

== March ==
The official communist party publication of North Vietnam outlined two scenarios for the future: victory in South Vietnam through political struggle or victory through a military victory. The first alternative and the implementation of the Paris Peace Accords was preferred to protect areas in South Vietnam controlled by communist forces and to forestall the return of the U.S. to active participation in the war. The strategy would be "revolutionary struggle" to destabilize South Vietnam, with the possibility of avoiding a full scale resumption of the war.

March to 17 May

The PAVN began the Battle of Hồng Ngự attacking the border town of Hồng Ngự in Dong Thap Province in order to interdict supply convoys into Cambodia. The battle resulted in 422 PAVN killed, 94 ARVN killed and 36 missing and over 300 civilians killed.

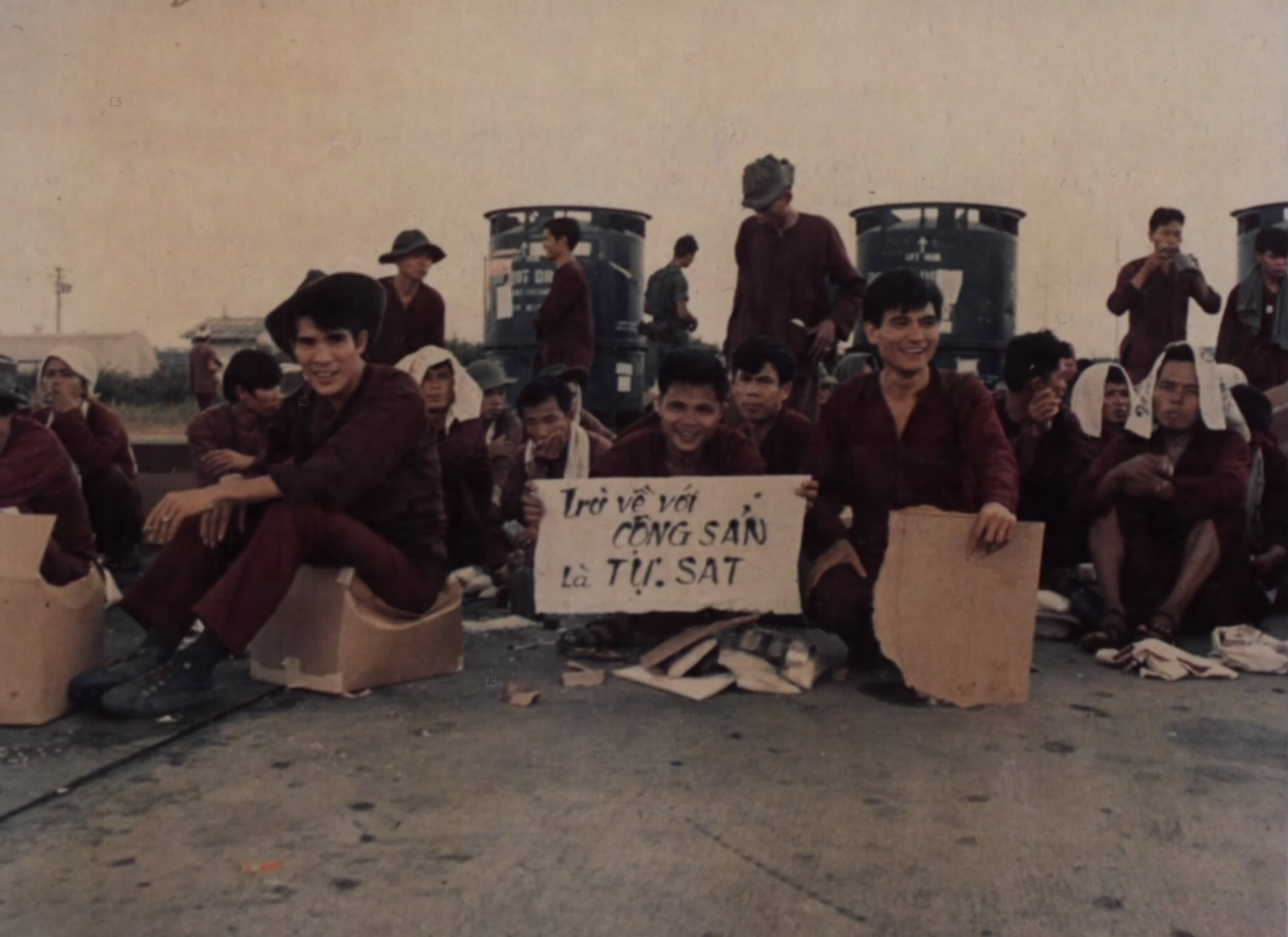
210 prisoners from the Bien Hoa POW Camp refuse repatriation and want to remain in South Vietnam

17 March

The last South Korean soldier left South Vietnam.

A disgruntled pro-Sihanouk Khmer Air Force (KAF) pilot flying a T-28D fighter-bomber attacked the Presidential Palace in Phnom Penh killing 43 people and injuring a further 35. The pilot then flew to Hainan Island. This incident led to the dismissal of KAF commander Brigadier General So Satto.

18 March

The International Commission of Control and Supervision, created to supervise the Paris Peace Accords, reported that "the cease fire [has] not... been effective" with numerous violations by South Vietnam, North Vietnam and the Viet Cong. "None of the Vietnamese parties wanted the kind of peace promised by the agreement" was the conclusion of one scholar.

19 March

An Air Vietnam DC-4 on a flight from Saigon to Buôn Ma Thuột crashed 6.5 km south of Buôn Ma Thuột killing all 58 onboard after a bomb exploded in the cargo hold.

25 March to 12 April 1974

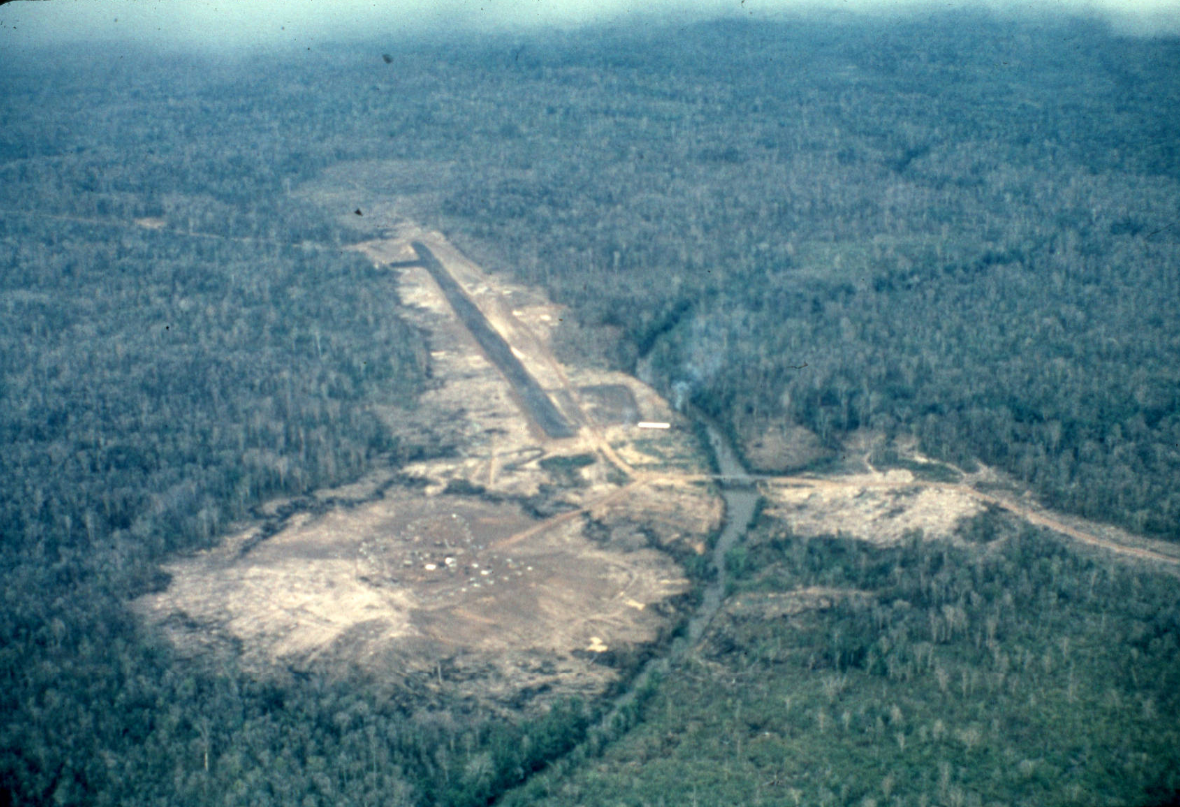
Tonle Cham Camp in March 1967

The PAVN began the Battle of Tong Le Chon besieging the Tonle Cham Camp. The defending South Vietnamese Rangers would eventually evacuate the camp.

29 March

The last American combat troops left Vietnam as per the Paris Peace Accords. The U.S. military command in South Vietnam, MACV ceased to exist and was replaced by the Defense Attaché Office (DAO) under the command of Major General John E. Murray. Fewer than 250 U.S. military personnel remained in Vietnam assigned to the DAO plus a few Marines for protection of the U.S. Embassy. About 8,500 civilians working for the U.S. government remained in South Vietnam.

An official publication of North Vietnam summed up the pluses and minuses of the peace agreement. On the positive side for North Vietnam, the U.S. had ended its military operations in both South and North Vietnam and had begun to remove mines from coastal waters of North Vietnam. On the negative side, the ceasefire had not been effective, although combat was not as intensive as before, and the U.S. continued to support South Vietnam by turning over its military bases and providing weapons and other military material to South Vietnam.

== April ==
1 April

The last known American POW, Captain Robert White, was released by North Vietnam.

2 April

Thiệu concluded a two-day visit to the United States. Nixon promised continued economic aid to South Vietnam, dependent upon U.S. congressional approval, and Thiệu pledged to never ask the United States to reintroduce American troops into South Vietnam.

7 April

Two ICCS helicopters were fired on by the PAVN near Route 9, Quảng Trị Province. One helicopter managed to land safely while the other was hit by an SA-7 missile killing all nine onboard including two Hungarian, one Canadian and one Indonesian ICCS observers.

19 April

The USAF began Giant Scale SR-71 reconnaissance missions along the periphery of North Vietnam, these continued on an average of once a week throughout 1973.

== May ==
11 May

The charges against Daniel Ellsberg and Anthony Russo for leaking the Pentagon Papers were dismissed due to "improper Government conduct."

== June ==
8 June to 16 September

The PAVN began the Battle of Trung Nghia by capturing the village of Trung Nghia in the Central Highlands. The ARVN would eventually recapture the area.

13 June

The U.S. and North Vietnam issued a joint communique calling on all parties to observe the 28 January ceasefire agreement with effect from 15 June.

19 June

The Case–Church Amendment approved by the U.S. Congress and signed into law prohibited further U.S. military activity in Vietnam, Laos and Cambodia after 15 August 1973. This ended direct U.S. military involvement in the Vietnam War, although the U.S. continued to provide military equipment and economic support to the South Vietnamese government.

21 June

Graham Martin was appointed as United States Ambassador to South Vietnam replacing Ellsworth Bunker.

30 June

The U.S. Embassy in Saigon reported that, in accordance with secret agreements between the U.S. and North Vietnam, the North Vietnamese had withdrawn 30,000 soldiers from South Vietnam. However, the Embassy warned that the military units had been refitted and could be redeployed back to South Vietnam.

30 June

The last American, Dwight Elliot Stone, to be inducted in the U.S. armed forces as a conscript began his military service. Stone had been drafted in 1972, but his entry into service was delayed until this date.

== July ==
1 July

U.S. aid to South Vietnam is projected to decrease from $2.2 billion in fiscal year 1973 (July 1972-June 1973) to $1.1 billion in fiscal year 1974 (July 1973-June 1974).

2 July

James Schlesinger replaced Elliot Richardson as U.S. Secretary of Defense.

17 July

Secretary of Defense James Schlesinger testified before the U.S. Congress that 3,500 American bombing raids had been carried out against Cambodia in 1969 and 1970. The raids had been conducted secretly and their extent had not been known until this testimony.

21 July

The plenum of the Communist Party of North Vietnam recommended the escalation of political activity and military action in South Vietnam "in response to Saigon's flagrant and continued violations of the ceasefire." However, the Politburo decided that all-out war was not feasible and that North Vietnam would continue to express adherence to the Paris Peace Accords.

27 July

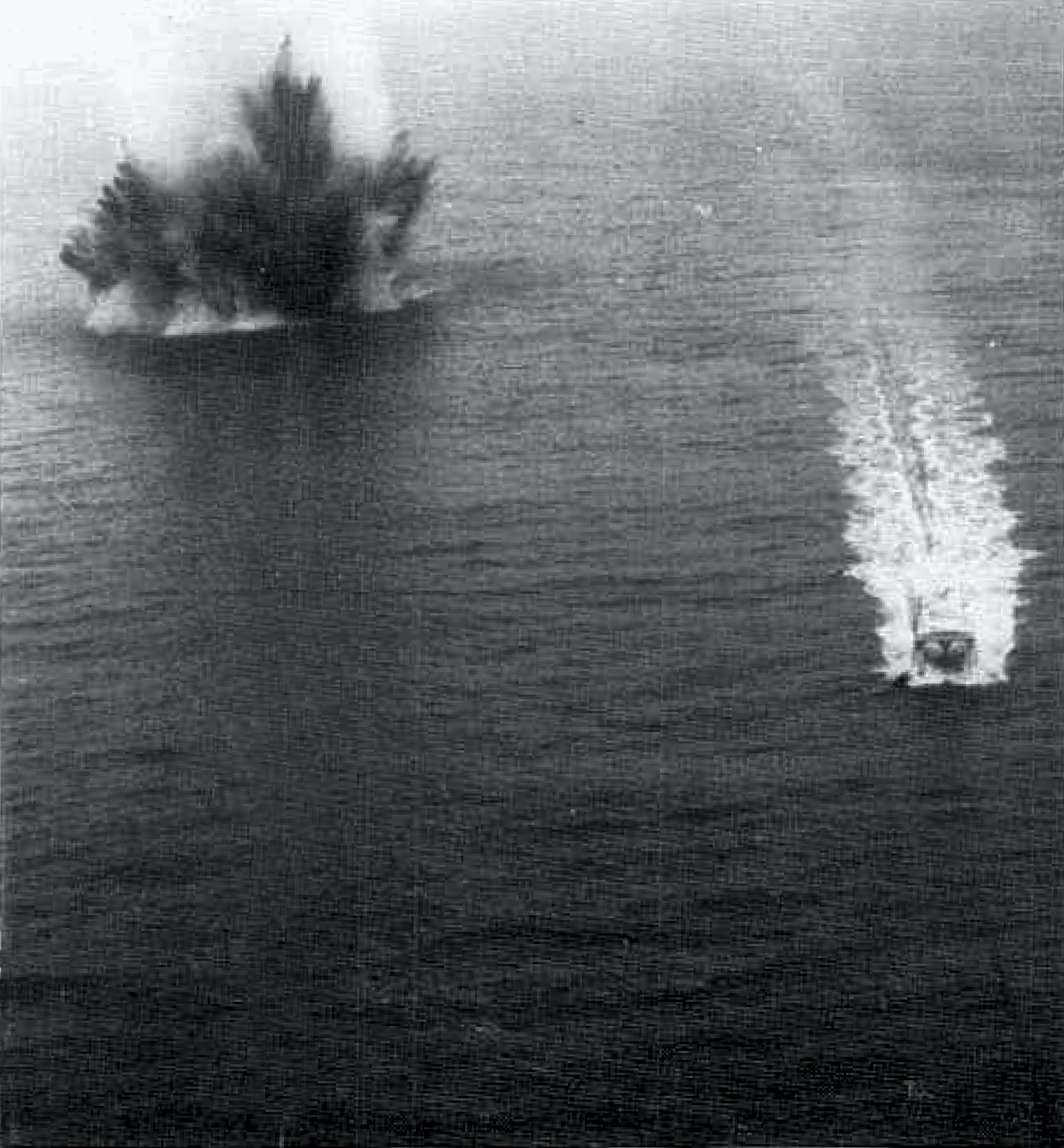
Mine explosion during Operation End Sweep

Operation End Sweep ended. In accordance with the Paris Peace Accords, the U.S. Navy cleared all naval mines from North Vietnamese coastal waters.

30 July

The total U.S. military presence in South Vietnam, in accordance with the Paris Peace Accords, is now less than 250, excluding the Marine guards at the U.S. Embassy in Saigon.

== August ==
6 August

Three B-52s accidentally bomb Neak Loeung, Cambodia killing or wounding over 400 civilians.

15 August

The last bombing by American planes anywhere in Indochina took place when B-52s hit a target in Cambodia. The intense bombing of Cambodia since February 1973 by the U.S. prevented the capture of Phnom Penh by the Khmer Rouge. However, Phnom Penh remained encircled by the Khmer Rouge.

20 August

The 1973 Laotian coup was a final attempt to stave off a communist coalition government of the Kingdom of Laos. Exiled General Thao Ma returned from Thailand on 20 August 1973 to take over Wattay International Airport outside the capital of Vientiane. Commandeering a T-28, he led air strikes upon the office and home of his hated rival, General Kouprasith Abhay. While Thao Ma was unsuccessfully bombing Kouprasith, loyal RLA troops retook the airfield. Shot down upon his return, Thao Ma was hauled from his airplane's wreckage and executed. The coalition agreement was signed 14 September 1973.

30 August

The VC killed seven ARVN soldiers and wounded 20 government soldiers and civilians in the Shelling of Cai Lay schoolyard.

== September ==
21 September

The last Marine units leave Royal Thai Air Base Nam Phong.

22 September

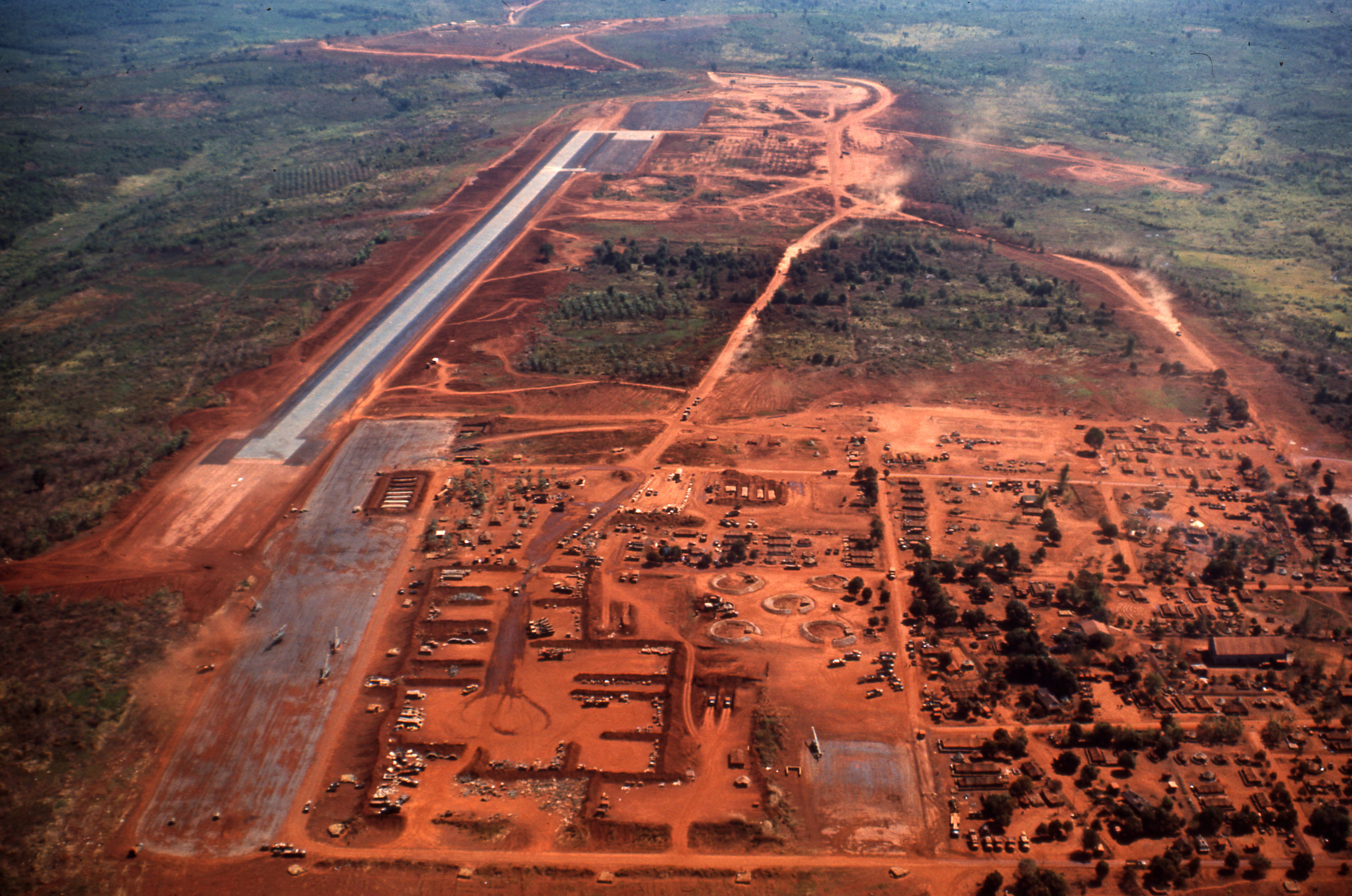
Plei Djereng Camp

The PAVN 26th Regiment, 320th Division supported by artillery and tanks captured Plei Djereng Camp in the Central Highlands. 200 of the 293 Rangers at the camp were killed or captured during the battle. PAVN casualties are not known but the RVNAF claimed three T-54 tanks destroyed during the battle

23 September

Henry Kissinger became United States Secretary of State replacing William P. Rogers.

In late September, the 2nd Battalion, 49th Infantry, 25th Division, was ambushed in a rubber plantation between Highway 22 and Khiem Hahn, losing 43 killed, and 150 weapons and 18 field radios lost.

== October ==
3 October

In the Battle of Ap Da Bien ARVN forces attacked the PAVN 207th Regiment killing over 200 PAVN.

16 October

Henry Kissinger and Lê Đức Thọ were jointly awarded the 1973 Nobel Peace Prize for their efforts in negotiating the Paris Peace Accords.

23 October

Thọ declines to accept the Nobel Peace Prize, claiming that peace had not yet been established and that the United States and the South Vietnamese governments were in violation of the Accords, becoming the first, and to date last person to turn down a Nobel Peace Prize.

30 October to 10 December

In the Battle of Quang Duc PAVN forces attempted to expand their logistical network from Cambodia into South Vietnam but were eventually forced back by the ARVN.

== November ==
6 November

A PAVN rocket attack on Bien Hoa Air Base destroyed three RVNAF F-5As.

7 November

The U.S. Congress adopted, over the President's veto, the War Powers Resolution of 1973 (50 U.S.C. 1541–1548) providing that the President can send U.S. armed forces into action abroad only by authorization of Congress or if the United States is already under attack or serious threat. The War Powers Resolution requires the president to notify Congress within 48 hours of committing armed forces to military action and forbids armed forces from remaining for more than 60 days, with a further 30-day withdrawal period, without an authorization of the use of military force or a declaration of war. The resolution was passed by two-thirds of Congress, overriding a presidential veto.

== December ==
2 December

The VC hit the Nhà Bè fuel depot, the largest fuel storage facility in South Vietnam with approximately 80% of the nation's storage capacity, with rocket fire destroying or damaging 30 fuel tanks and igniting over 600,000 barrels of fuel.

15 December

Captain Richard Morgan Rees serving with Field Team 6, Control Team B, Headquarters, Joint Casualty Resolution Center was killed when VC forces ambushed a joint US-South Vietnamese team engaged on an MIA recovery mission 15 miles (24 km) southwest of Saigon. A South Vietnamese pilot was also killed in the attack and another four Americans were wounded. As a result of this attack all US MIA field recovery efforts were indefinitely suspended.

31 December

Only 50 U.S. military personnel remained in Vietnam. South Vietnamese armed forces totaled 1.1 million. 233,748 South Vietnamese have been killed in combat as of this date.

== Year in numbers ==
Armed Force	KIA	Reference	Military costs – 1971	Military costs in 2026 US$	Reference
South Vietnam	27,901
United States	68
North Vietnam

== See also ==
List of allied military operations of the Vietnam War (1973)
