= Võ Văn Ba =

Vietnamese spy

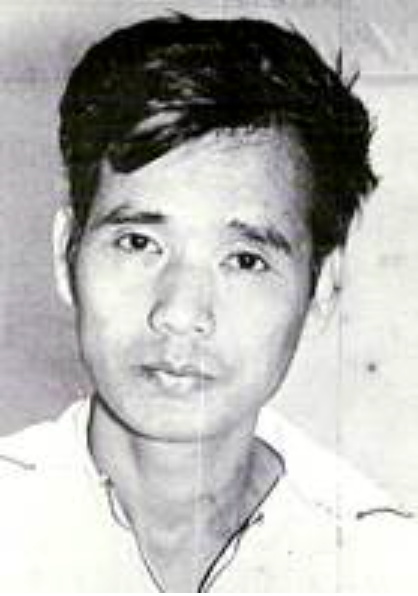
- Born: January 1, 1923; Long An province, French Indochina
- Died: June 8, 1975 (aged 52); Saigon, Vietnam
- Military career
- Allegiance: South Vietnam
- Branch: Vietcong
- Service years: 1965-1975

Võ Văn Ba (1923 – 8 June 1975) was a spy for South Vietnam and the United States' Central Intelligence Agency (CIA) during the Vietnam War.

== Early life ==
Ba was born in 1923 in Long An province, French Cochinchina.

== Career ==
Ba joined the NLF (National Liberation Front) and served as a cadre in Tây Ninh province. In the mid-1960s, he was recruited by the South Vietnamese Police Special Branch and from 1969 onwards he was run as a spy by the South Vietnamese and the CIA. He provided his handlers with correspondence and plans from the Central Office for South Vietnam (COSVN), the political and military headquarters that controlled the insurgency in South Vietnam.

At the end of his career, he was serving as the Communist Party secretary for Phu Kuong district, Tây Ninh province with responsibility for recruiting members of the Cao Dai religious sect.

Frank Snepp, who served as a CIA agent at the Embassy of the United States, Saigon from 1969 to the Fall of Saigon in April 1975, described Ba as the most important intelligence asset of the war, saying he was the equivalent of having a spy in Hitler's bunker.

== Capture and death ==
As South Vietnam collapsed in the face of the 1975 spring offensive, the PAVN captured many South Vietnamese military and intelligence officers including a Mr. Phuong who identified Ba as a South Vietnamese spy. Ba was arrested in Tây Ninh province on the last day of the war, 30 April 1975. According to North Vietnamese sources, he committed suicide while in prison awaiting trial on 8 June 1975.
