= Shelling of Cai Lay schoolyard =

1973 terrorist attack

- Part of Vietnam War
- Location: Cai Lậy District, Định Tường province, Vietnam
- Date: 9 March 1974
- Attack type: Bombing
- Weapon: Artillery Bombardment
- Deaths: 23
- Injuries: 32
- Perpetrator: Disputed

The shelling was an attack on a Cai Lậy District government-controlled schoolyard in Cai Lậy town, Định Tường province, South Vietnam on 9 March 1974. The shelling was centered on the districts of Cái Bè and Cai Lậy, areas of traditional VC control in Định Tường Province in the northern delta.

According to the Saigon military command, 23 students were killed and 32 others injured. The US Government called the bombardment part of "the terrorist campaign of the Democratic Republic of Viet Nam. The Provisional Revolutionary Government of the Republic of South Vietnam and South Vietnam each blamed the other for the attack.
