= Chí Linh Camp =

Chí Linh Camp (Chí Linh Airfield)
- Đồng Xoài, Binh Phuoc Province in Vietnam

Site information
- Type: Army base
- Operator: Army of the Republic of Vietnam (ARVN); United States Army (U.S. Army)
- Condition: Abandoned

Location
- Shown within Vietnam
- Coordinates: 11.514°N 106.7549°E

Site history
- Built: 1967
- In use: 1967-1974
- Battles/wars: Vietnam War

Garrison information
- Garrison: 5th Special Forces Group; 215th Regional Force Company

Airfield information
Runways
Direction	Length and surface
00/00	PSP
- C-130 capable airfield

Chí Linh Camp (also known as Chí Linh SF Camp) is a former U.S. Army and Army of the Republic of Vietnam (ARVN) base west of Đồng Xoài in Binh Phuoc Province, southern Vietnam.

== History ==
The 5th Special Forces Group Detachment A-333 first established a base here in January 1967. The base was located on Highway 14 16 km west of Đồng Xoài.

By late 1972 Chí Linh was defended by Regional Forces and due to People's Army of Vietnam (PAVN) road interdiction it could only be resupplied by air.

In April 1974 Chí Linh was defended by the 215th Regional Force Company with a platoon of two 105 mm howitzers. The PAVN 7th Division attacked Chí Linh in the first week of April, quickly damaging the two howitzers and destroying the ammunition dump. On 5 April the PAVN 3rd Battalion, 141st Regiment, with the division's 28th Sapper and 22d Artillery Battalion supporting, overran the base. By 10 April, about half of the defenders and 20 dependents had straggled into Đồng Xoài or Chơn Thành Camp to the west. The rest, about 50 men, remained unaccounted for.

With the elimination of Chí Linh, the PAVN 7th Division enjoyed unimpeded movement along Highway 14 between Chơn Thành and Đồng Xoài, from north to south along the Sông Bé corridor, and had reduced the effectiveness of the South Vietnamese defenses at Đồng Xoài and Chơn Thành.

== Current use ==
The base is now forestry and housing.
