= Chơn Thành Camp =

Chơn Thành Camp (Chơn Thành Airfield)
- An Lộc, Bình Phước province in Vietnam
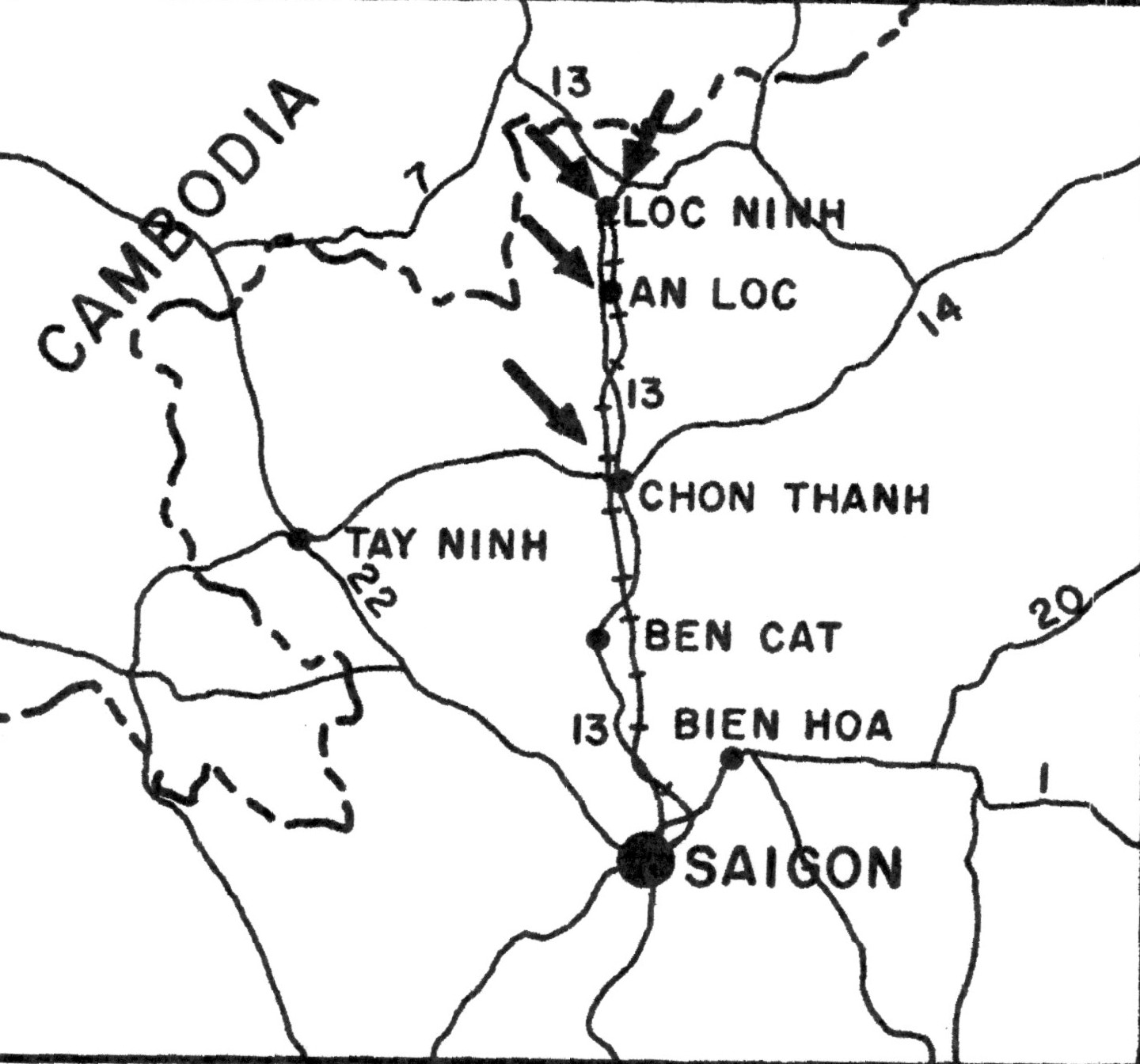
- Location of Chơn Thành on Highway 13

Site information
- Type: Army base
- Operator: Army of the Republic of Vietnam (ARVN); United States Army (U.S. Army)
- Condition: Abandoned

Location
- Shown within Vietnam
- Coordinates: 11.402°N 106.6195°E

Site history
- Built: 1966
- In use: 1966-1975
- Battles/wars: Vietnam War

Garrison information
- Garrison: 5th Special Forces Group; 31st Ranger Group

Airfield information
- Elevation: 250 feet (76 m) AMSL
Runways
Direction	Length and surface
00/00	3,600 feet (1,097 m) PSP

Chơn Thành Camp is a former U.S. Army and Army of the Republic of Vietnam (ARVN) base south of An Lộc in southern Vietnam.

== History ==
The 5th Special Forces Group Detachment A-332B first established a base here in October 1966. The base was located on Highway 13 near the intersection with Highway 14 24 km north of Lai Khê and approximately 25 km south of An Lộc.

In August 1972, following the Battle of An Lộc, the camp and An Lộc itself were the only remaining ARVN bases in Bình Long Province and were entirely dependent on aerial resupply. The People's Army of Vietnam (PAVN) 271st Regiment, 9th Division was located northeast of Chơn Thành in southern Bình Long Province in position to block the ARVN from using Highway 13 between Chơn Thành and An Lộc and to threaten ARVN posts at Chí Linh and Đồng Xoài. In addition the PAVN 7th Division operated from a base east of Highway 13 between Chơn Thành and Bàu Bàng District. The camp was defended by Vietnamese Rangers and Regional Forces (RF), supported by a rotation of Regiments of the 5th Division. On 15 September 1972, a PAVN/VC attack on the camp was repulsed for the loss of 38 PAVN and four ARVN killed.

From 3 to 15 June 1973, the ARVN launched an unsuccessful operation to reopen Highway 13 between Lai Khê and Chơn Thành. The 7th Infantry Regiment, 5th Division set out from Chơn Thành to link up with the 8th Infantry Regiment advancing north from Bàu Bàng. Despite firing 87,000 artillery rounds in support of this operation, the 7th Infantry's advance was stopped after 5–6 km and they returned to Chơn Thành having suffered moderate casualties.

In early January 1974, just west of Chơn Thành, the ARVN 2nd Battalion, 8th Infantry, 5th Division, was struck hard by the PAVN 7th Battalion, 209th Infantry, losing 36 killed and 85 weapons captured.

In February 1974, the ARVN 5th Division made another unsuccessful attempt to reopen Highway 13 between Lai Khê and Chơn Thành. A similar effort was made in March with the same results.

=== Battle of Chơn Thành ===
By mid-March 1975, with the PAVN's Spring Offensive underway, the ARVN enclaves at An Lộc and Chơn Thành were of no further military or political value and the 32nd Ranger Group defending An Lộc and the 31st Ranger Group defending Chơn Thành were needed to bolster the hard-pressed defenses throughout the region. Furthermore, the PAVN 273rd Infantry Regiment, 341st Division was discovered near Chơn Thành. To save the Rangers and RF in An Lộc and Chơn Thành, III Corps commander General Nguyễn Văn Toàn ordered an evacuation of An Lộc on 18 March. Among the first to be moved were 12 105 mm howitzers, while five of the 155 mm howitzers had to be destroyed because the Republic of Vietnam Air Force (RVNAF) did not have heavy-lift helicopters to move them. One Ranger battalion, the province headquarters and the III Corps Ranger Command were removed by helicopter, while the other two Ranger battalions and RF troops were to move south along Highway 13 to Chơn Thành. The overland force left on the night of 19 March and despite a few minor skirmishes arrived at Chơn Thành on 20 March.

The defenses at Chơn Thành comprised an earth ditch and then a 6-foot (1.8 m) wall dotted with fighting positions. With the arrival of the 32nd Rangers it was now defended by six Ranger battalions, one RF battalion, 11 M41 tanks and artillery, however the 32nd Ranger battalion was soon removed. Before the ARVN could begin their withdrawal from Chơn Thành at 09:30 on 24 March, two regiments of the 9th Division supported by T-54 tanks attacked the base. The defenders held their fire until the tanks were close and then hit them with antitank rockets and recoilless rifle fire destroying 7 and, together with RVNAF airstrikes, they killed more than 100 PAVN soldiers. On the 26th, the 9th Division attacked again, apparently trying to retrieve disabled tanks, but was repulsed again. By 27 March, the 273rd Regiment which had been holding blocking positions on Highway 13 south of Chơn Thành was sent to reinforce the 9th Division for another assault on the camp. After two attacks the PAVN had been repulsed for the loss of 240 killed and 11 tanks destroyed, while ARVN losses were 50 killed and wounded. At dawn on 31 March, following a 3,000 round bombardment by 105 mm and 155 mm howitzers and 120 mm mortars, the entire 9th Division, 273rd Regiment and the remaining tanks attacked Chơn Thành again. The PAVN penetrated the camp defenses three times and were repulsed each time. However resupply, reinforcement and medical evacuation from the camp was now impossible and the Ranger commander, Colonel Nguyen Thanh Chuan, received permission from General Toàn to abandon Chơn Thành. Accordingly, on 1 April the RVNAF saturated the PAVN assembly areas and bivouacs with 52 sorties; under the cover of this attack, the Ranger and RF battalions began withdrawing separately to Bàu Bàng and Lai Khê, taking the remaining artillery and M41s with them. One Ranger battalion and the RF battalion were ambushed and suffered moderate losses, but the 31st Ranger Group was now available to support South Vietnamese defenses elsewhere.

== Current use ==
The base is now farmland and housing.
