= A Lưới district =

Coordinates: 16.167°N 107.333°E

A Lưới district Huyện A Lưới Alơiaq camp
- Rural District
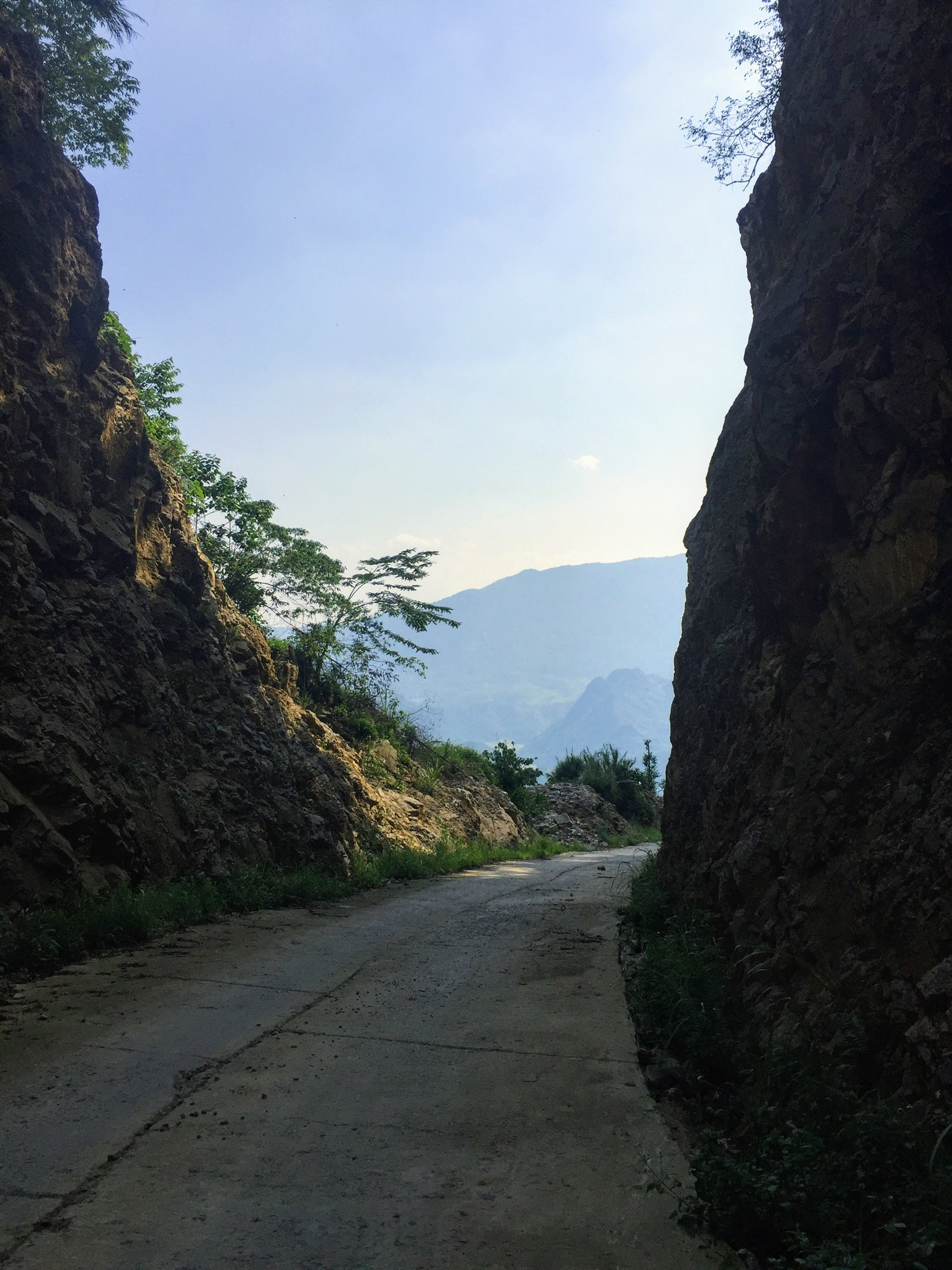
- A pass in A Lưới.

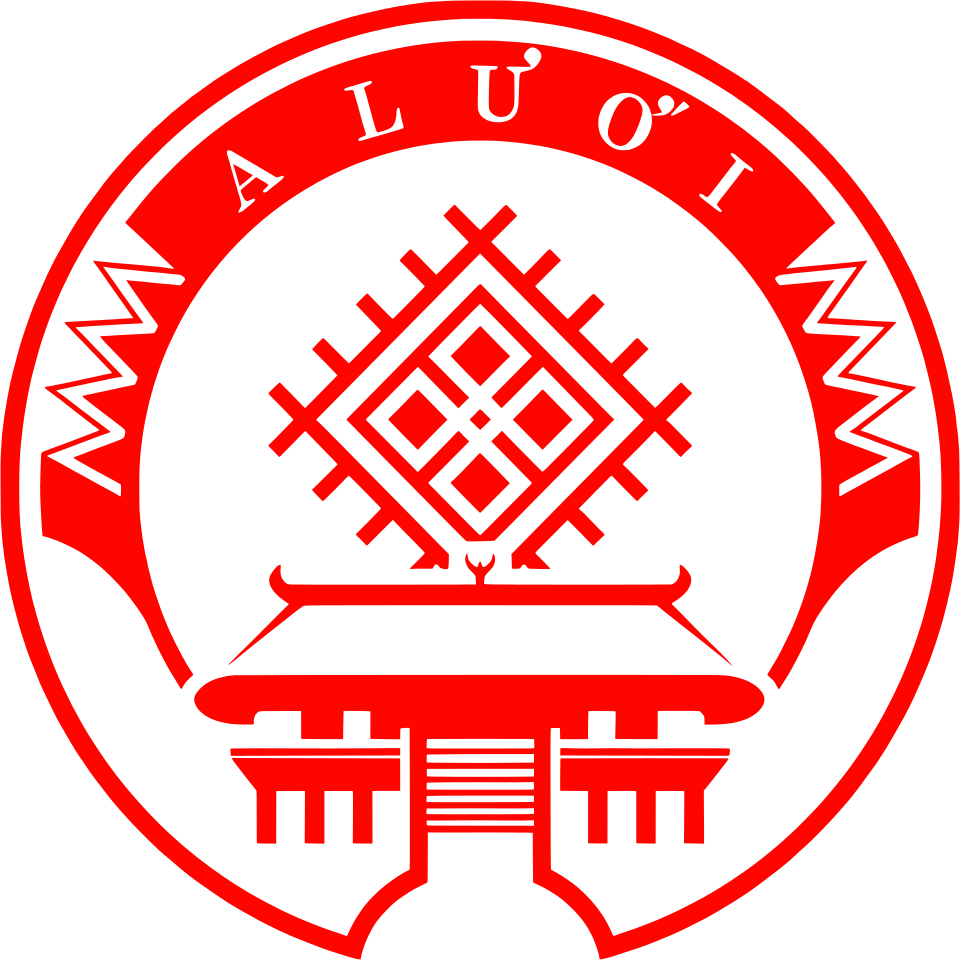
- Seal
- Interactive map of A Lưới district
- Country: Vietnam
- Region: North Central Coast
- Municipality: Huế
- Central hall: No.195, Hồ Chí Minh Highway, Alơiaq township

Government
  - Type: Rural district

Area
  - Total: 1.229 km^{2} (0.475 sq mi)

Population (2003)
  - Total: 38,616
  - Density: 31,420/km^{2} (81,380/sq mi)
- Time zone: UTC+7 (Indochina Time)

A Lưới is a former rural district of Huế city in the North Central Coast region of Vietnam.

== History ==
According to researcher Trần Văn Sáng, its name A Lưới in Kinh language was originated from Alơiaq in Ta'Oi language. It is the name of a hero in mythology of ethnic minority groups from the Phouluang Highlands.

The rural district is located west in the highly mountainous area of A Shau Valley bordering Laos. The population includes many Bru, Tanka and Ta'Oi people. As of 2003 the district had a population of 38,616. The district covers an area of 1,229 km^{2} and its capital lies at A Lưới, a former French airfield, later used by the Americans in Operation Delaware and then by the North Vietnamese for courier flights.

Many areas and mountains in the A Luoi region became historically significant in the mid-late 1960s during the Vietnam War, such the Battle of A Shau, the 5th Special Forces' A Lưới Camp that was overrun in 1966, as well as the 4,878-foot Dong Re Lao Mountain best known as the "Signal Hill" that was seized by 1st Cavalry Division LRRP / Rangers in 1968 during the Operation Delaware. Also, A Bia Mountain, known as the Hamburger Hill that was seized by members of the 101st Airborne Division.

A Lưới is connected to the former French colonial capital and coastal city, Huế, one of the main historical cities in central Vietnam by National Road 49, a road notorious for poor safety because of the mountainous terrain and poor road surface.

== Geography ==
A Lưới rural district has one town and 21 communes. The central town has gas stations, and a few guest-houses for travelers.

- Municipality : Alơiaq capital-township.
- Communes : Hồng Thủy, Hồng Vân, Hồng Trung, Hồng Kim, Hồng Nam, Hồng Hạ, Hồng Bắc, Bắc Sơn, Hồng Quảng, A Ngo, Sơn Thủy, Phú Vinh, Nhâm, Hồng Thái, Hồng Thượng, Hương Phong, Hương Lâm, Đông Sơn, A Đớt, A Roàng, Hương Nguyên.

=== Climate ===
Climate data for A Lưới, elevation 600 m (2,000 ft)
Month	Jan	Feb	Mar	Apr	May	Jun	Jul	Aug	Sep	Oct	Nov	Dec	Year
Record high °C (°F)	31.5 (88.7)	34.6 (94.3)	36.2 (97.2)	39.2 (102.6)	38.0 (100.4)	37.1 (98.8)	34.9 (94.8)	35.3 (95.5)	33.9 (93.0)	32.4 (90.3)	31.2 (88.2)	30.7 (87.3)	39.2 (102.6)
Mean daily maximum °C (°F)	21.4 (70.5)	23.4 (74.1)	26.6 (79.9)	29.4 (84.9)	30.4 (86.7)	30.7 (87.3)	30.5 (86.9)	29.8 (85.6)	28.3 (82.9)	25.6 (78.1)	22.9 (73.2)	20.7 (69.3)	26.6 (79.9)
Daily mean °C (°F)	17.3 (63.1)	18.5 (65.3)	20.7 (69.3)	22.9 (73.2)	24.2 (75.6)	25.4 (77.7)	25.0 (77.0)	24.7 (76.5)	23.3 (73.9)	21.7 (71.1)	19.9 (67.8)	17.7 (63.9)	21.8 (71.2)
Mean daily minimum °C (°F)	14.8 (58.6)	15.5 (59.9)	17.2 (63.0)	19.3 (66.7)	20.8 (69.4)	22.1 (71.8)	21.7 (71.1)	21.6 (70.9)	20.5 (68.9)	19.4 (66.9)	18.0 (64.4)	15.7 (60.3)	18.9 (66.0)
Record low °C (°F)	5.9 (42.6)	8.2 (46.8)	8.1 (46.6)	12.5 (54.5)	12.6 (54.7)	16.6 (61.9)	17.4 (63.3)	17.4 (63.3)	14.7 (58.5)	10.8 (51.4)	9.2 (48.6)	5.4 (41.7)	5.4 (41.7)
Average precipitation mm (inches)	80.1 (3.15)	48.9 (1.93)	70.4 (2.77)	160.3 (6.31)	253.7 (9.99)	188.0 (7.40)	167.0 (6.57)	228.4 (8.99)	438.6 (17.27)	856.7 (33.73)	757.4 (29.82)	317.7 (12.51)	3,606 (141.97)
Average rainy days	16.6	13.4	14.5	16.5	20.1	14.4	14.9	17.4	20.5	23.2	22.5	21.9	216.3
Average relative humidity (%)	91.6	91.0	89.3	87.8	86.1	80.6	80.3	82.2	89.1	91.6	92.9	92.9	88.0
Mean monthly sunshine hours	112.6	127.8	160.2	170.1	185.4	179.9	185.0	165.9	130.7	111.5	82.8	72.4	1,679.9
Source: Vietnam Institute for Building Science and Technology

== Culture ==
There are many ways to get to A Luoi such as local bus at South Bus Station.

You can also rent a private car to explore Bú Tí for one or two days. You can also drive to Hue city or Hoian Town. You can also take photos of the minority people on a Vietnam Photo tour.

== See also ==
- Battle of A Shau
- Battle of Signal Hill Vietnam
- Dong Re Lao Mountain
- Operation Delaware
