= Long-range penetration =

Kind of special operations military unit

A long-range penetration patrol, group, or force is a special operations unit capable of operating long distances behind enemy lines far away from direct contact with friendly forces as opposed to a Long Range Reconnaissance Patrol, a small group primarily engaged in scouting missions.

== History ==
In the modern era, long-range penetration is recognized as starting with Major Ralph Alger Bagnold with his 1940 Long Range Desert Group (LRDG) in the Western Desert. The LRDG carried out operations of reconnaissance and sabotage far behind the enemy's lines in the Libyan Desert. Bagnold was an experienced desert explorer who had his LRDG trained in desert driving, navigation through using the sun and stars as well as a compass, and knowing their territory. They were supplied by all the equipment that their trucks could carry.

In 1942, several British Special Operations Executive (SOE) personnel who had escaped from Singapore to Australia, formed the Allied Services Reconnaissance Department (SRD) for special operations in the South West Pacific theatre. Z Special Unit ("Z Force") was organised under its auspices to conduct commando-style operations behind Japanese lines. The long distances to all potential targets made unconventional, long-range penetration tactics a requirement for Z Force. It recruited Australian, British, New Zealand and Dutch East Indies personnel and, later, amongst indigenous resistance fighters. In Operation Jaywick (September 1943), a detachment led by Captain Ivan Lyon travelled on a small Indonesian fishing boat, from Australia to the vicinity of Singapore, where folding kayaks were used to approach ships and attach limpet mines. These sank or seriously damaged 39,000 tons of shipping, as the raiders returned to Australia. In September 1944, Lyon led a second raid on Singapore, Operation Rimau, which resulted in the deaths of the entire raiding force. During 1943–45, other Z Force operatives conducted intelligence gathering and guerilla operations throughout the Southwest Pacific, including preparations for Allied landings in the Philippines and Borneo campaign.

Brigadier Orde Wingate, a professional soldier famous for his unconventional behavior and ideas, had created and led guerrilla units in Palestine and Ethiopia, before being transferred, in 1942, to the South East Asian theatre. Wingate had ideas of deep penetration operations that could be made possible through improvements in the range of communication devices and airborne supply by long range aircraft. At the Quebec Conference in 1943, Wingate explained his ideas to Winston Churchill, Franklin D. Roosevelt, and many other leaders. Wingate proposed creating strongholds in enemy territory that would be supplied by air and be as effective against the enemy as conventional troops. Wingate was given command of the 77th Indian Infantry Brigade that acquired the name of Chindit from a suggestion by Captain Aung Thin of the Burma Rifles. The name was a corruption of the mythical beast that guards Buddhist temples called 'Chinthé' or 'Chinthay'. The unit was supported by the United States Army Air Forces 1st Air Commando Group and carried out two major operations. The first was entering Burma on a 200-mile mission in February 1943 with 3,000 troops, with mules and some elephants for the carrying of supplies. Wingate thought the operation a success, but Field Marshal William Slim thought the operation a failure.

In 1943, General Joseph Stilwell requested the deployment of US Army special forces to support the Chinese Army regular forces under his command. General George Marshall authorised a "Long Range Penetration Force", recruited from US Army troops trained in jungle warfare in Panama and the continental United States, as well as personnel with recent combat experience in the Solomon Islands and New Guinea campaigns. The unit was formally named the 5307th Composite Unit (Provisional), but became famous as "Merrill's Marauders"; it carried out operations in Burma in 1944. Survivors of "Merrill's Marauders" combined with members of the 124th Cavalry Regiment (Special), Texas National Guard became the 5332nd Brigade (Provisional) and continued operations in Burma until 1945.

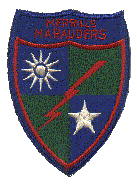
Shoulder sleeve insignia (SSI) worn by members of Merrills Marauders, 5307th Composite Unit (Provisional) in Burma.

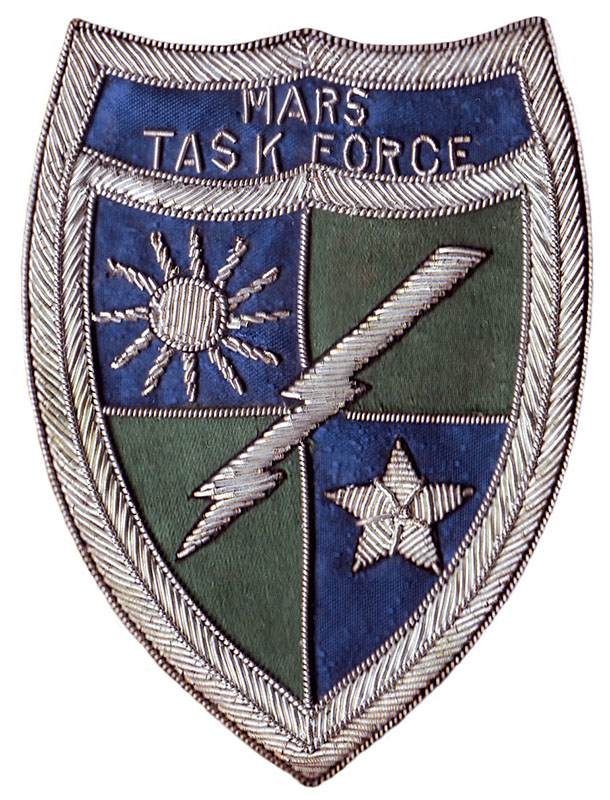
Shoulder sleeve insignia (SSI) worn by members of the MARS Task Force, 5332nd Brigade (Provisional) in Burma.

== Post World War II ==
After World War II, long range penetration operations were primarily conducted by small units of men often varying in size from five to thirty men. Sabotage, surveillance, and seizure of strategic locations were the primary objective carried out deep behind enemy lines. Most notable are the British Special Air Service (SAS), The Israeli Sayeret Matkal, the Australian Special Air Service Regiment, the New Zealand Special Air Service (NZSAS), the Rhodesian Special Air Service, the South African's 32nd Battalion operations after the Angolan Civil War, and the Sri Lanka Army long range penetration units operations during the Sri Lanka Civil War.

== Vietnam War ==
In April 1968 members of the 2nd Platoon, Company E, 52nd Infantry, 1st Air Cavalry Division, Long Range Reconnaissance Patrol (LRP), commanded by Captain Michael Gooding and Lieutenant Joseph Dilger, conducted one of the most daring long-range penetration operations of the Vietnam War when they seized the strategic 4,879-foot mountain peak of Dong Re Lao Mountain, dubbed "Signal Hill" by headquarters during Operation Delaware. Signal Hill was deep in enemy territory in the heavily fortified A Shau Valley bordering Laos. After intense fighting against troops of the North Vietnamese Army, the mountaintop was secured, providing a vital communications relay site and fire support base for massive air assault operations to proceed in the valley by the 1st and 3rd Brigades, 1st Air Cavalry Division. Since satellite communications were a thing of the future, those brigades, hidden deep behind the towering wall of mountains would have been unable to communicate with headquarters near the coast at Camp Evans or with approaching aircraft.

== See also ==
- Battle of Signal Hill Vietnam
- Company E, 52nd Infantry (LRP)
- Dong Re Lao Mountain
- Long Range Reconnaissance Patrol
- Long Range Surveillance
- Operation Delaware
- 75th Ranger Regiment
