= Company E, 52nd Infantry Regiment =

Long-range reconnaissance patrol unit

Company E, 52nd Infantry, (LRP) was a 120 man-sized long-range reconnaissance patrol unit attached to the 1st Cavalry Division (Airmobile) under the operational umbrella of the 191st Military Intelligence Company in Vietnam in 1967-69. Its origin begins on January 1, 1967, as LRRP Detachment G2, 1st Cavalry Division (Airmobile). It was then redesignated Headquarters & Headquarters Company LRRP Detachment in April 1967, and redesignated Company E, 52nd Infantry (LRP) on December 20, 1967.

Later, when all LRRP units were folded into the US Army Rangers on February 1, 1969, Company E was redesignated H Company, 75th Infantry (Ranger).

== History ==
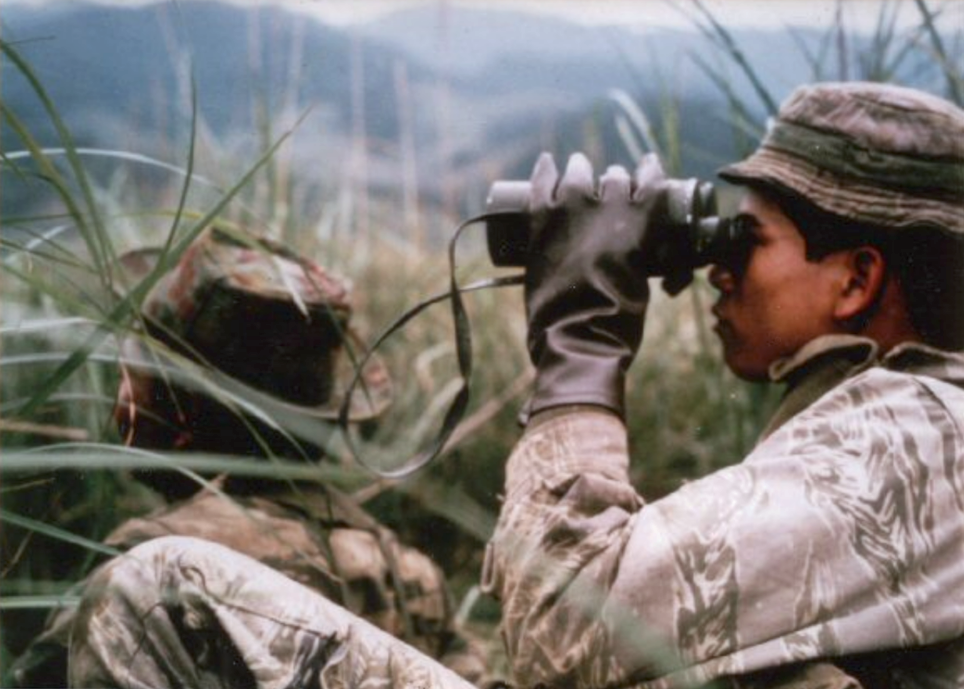
Company E Montagnards in I Corps

In November 1966 Captain James D. James, a Special Forces-trained officer, and Ranger Staff Sergeant Ronald Christopher, were selected to establish a long-range reconnaissance patrol detachment for the 1st Cavalry Division, designated LRRP Detachment G2. This company was based on other LRP units forming in Vietnam; as well as the two already formed in Germany and the one in Italy, respectively: Company D, 17th Infantry (LRP) in V Corps, headquartered in Frankfurt; Company C, VII Corps, 58th Infantry, headquartered in Stuttgart, and the Airborne Recon Platoon, 1st Combat Aviation Company (Provisional), headquartered in Verona, Italy, which Captain James previously commanded.

LRRP Detachment G2 became operational on January 1, 1967, and on December 20, 1967, it was redesignated Company E (LRP), 52nd Infantry (Airborne).

Company E participated in some of the most notable battles of the Vietnam War and as Company H, 75th Infantry, it became the most decorated and longest serving unit in LRP / Ranger history. Company H, 75th Infantry, also lost the last two Rangers of the Vietnam War: Sgt. Elvis Weldon Osborne, Jr., and Cpl. Jeffery Alan Maurer, both killed in action June 9, 1972. In all, approximately 1,000 men served in this unit of whom 45 were killed in Vietnam and Cambodia and approximately 400 were wounded or injured on patrol, a casualty rate of 45 percent.

Company E was commanded by Captain Michael Gooding and his operations and intelligence section was commanded by Staff Sergeant Thomas Campbell. In January 1968 Operation Jeb Stuart commenced and Company E and the 1st Cavalry Division moved north to Camp Evans, north of Huế and up to LZ Sharon and LZ Betty, south of Quảng Trị City, near the coast in the I Corps Tactical Zone. Operation Jeb Stuart was conducted as the preliminary phase to relieve the siege of the Khe Sanh combat base and support the 3rd Marine Division's operations along the DMZ, and to clear enemy Base Areas 101 and 114, respectively in Quang Tri Province and Thua Thien Provinces. As a result, the 1st and 3rd Platoons of Company E, 52nd Infantry (LRP) were based at Camp Evans to support the 2nd and 3rd Brigades in the Thua Thien Province, 1st Cavalry Division, while the 2nd Platoon was stationed at LZ Betty (Headquarters 1st Brigade) in Quang Tri Province.

== Tet Offensive ==
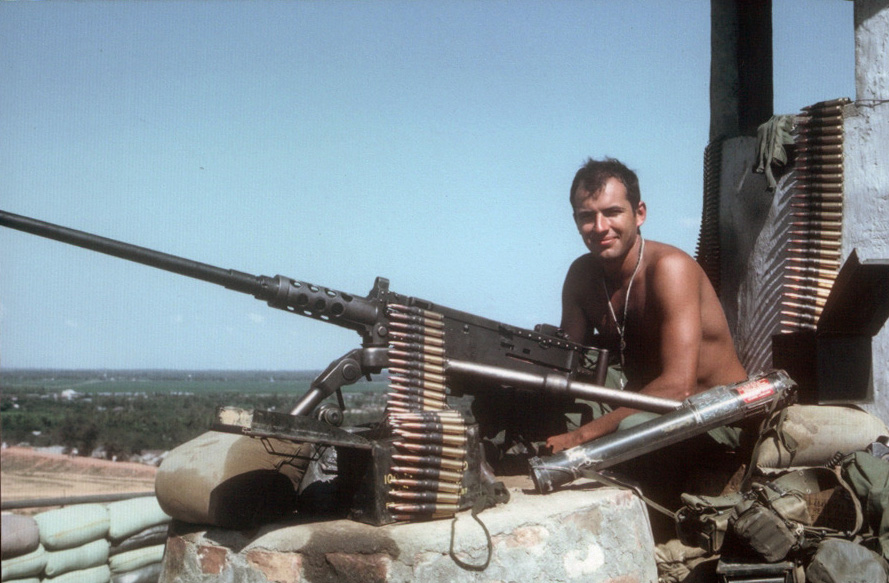
January 27, 1968. 1st Cav LRP, Sgt. Douglas Parkinson, manning an M2 .50 atop the water tower at LZ Betty.

In the early morning hours of January 31, 1968, the largest battle of the Vietnam War, the Tet Offensive, was launched by 84,000 enemy soldiers across South Vietnam. In the 1st Cavalry Division's area of operation, the People's Army of Vietnam (PAVN) and Vietcong forces struck at Huế, south of Camp Evans. As the 3rd Brigade, 1st Cavalry Division, fought to cut off enemy reinforcements pouring into Huế, at Quảng Trị City, further north, five enemy battalions, most from the PAVN 324th Division, attacked the city and LZ Betty. To stop allied troops from intervening, three other enemy infantry battalions deployed as blocking forces, all supported by a 122mm-rocket battalion and two heavy-weapons companies armed with 82mm mortars and 75mm recoilless rifles. Captain Gooding and his 2nd Platoon, Company E, commanded by Lieutenant George Utter, directed mortar, artillery, and small arms fire against charging enemy troops from atop the LZ Betty's forty-foot water tower.

After two days of intense fighting by the 1st Brigade, 1st Cavalry Division and the Army of the Republic of Vietnam (ARVN)1st Division, 900 PAVN and Vietcong soldiers were killed in and around Quảng Trị City and LZ Betty. However, across South Vietnam, 1,000 Americans, 2,100 ARVNs, 14,000 civilians, and 32,000 NVA and Vietcong lay dead.

== Operation Pegasus: Relief of the Khe Sanh combat base ==
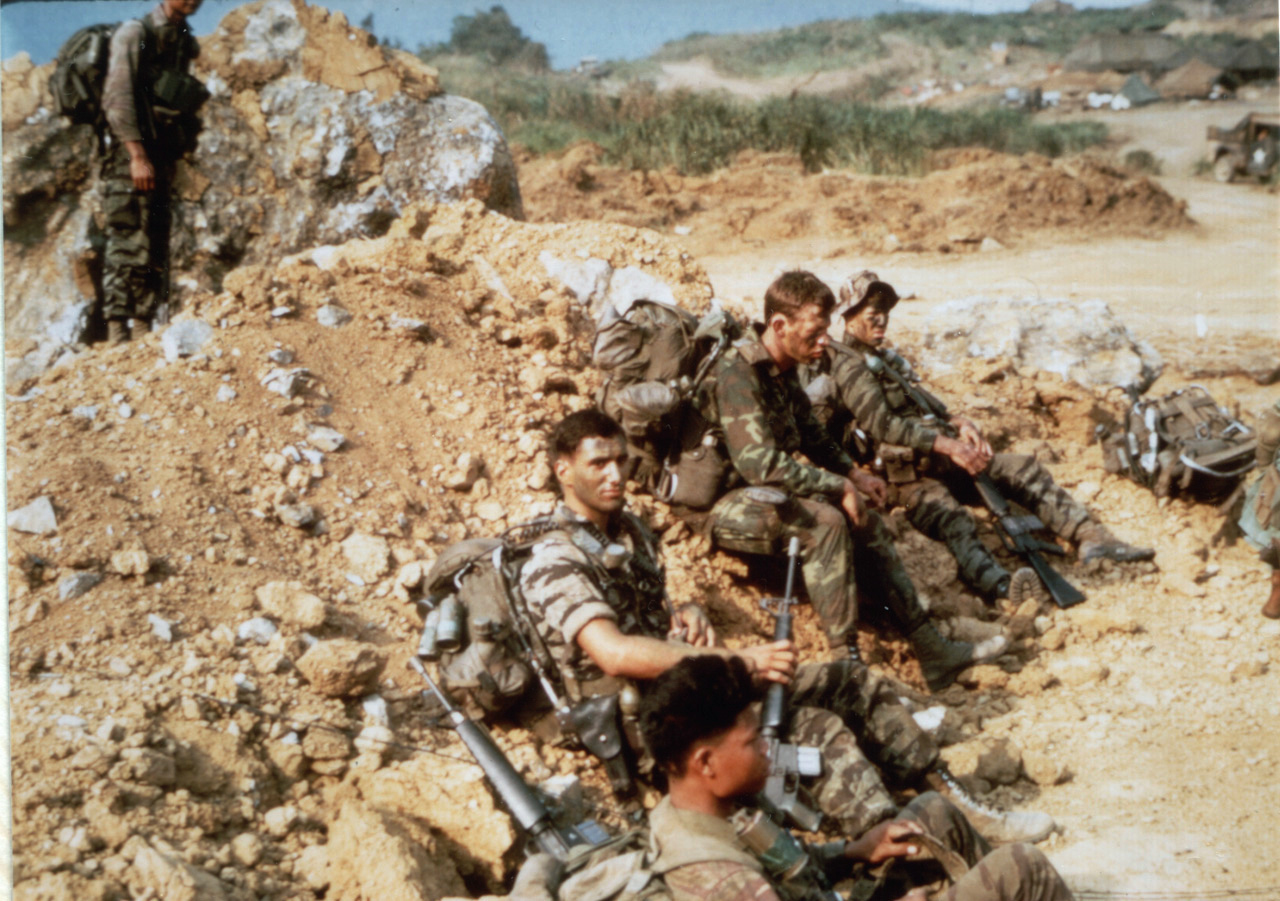
April 1968. Company E LRPs at LZ Stud awaiting Khe Sanh patrol. Sgt. Bob Whitten on right (KIA 5/8/68).

In March 1968 the 1st Cavalry Division and Company E moved west to LZ Stud, the staging area for Operation Pegasus to break the siege at Khe Sanh. All three brigades participated in this vast airmobile operation, along with a Marine armor thrust from Ca Lu along Route 9. The 1st Cavalry Division deployed Company E long-range reconnaissance teams to flank its airmobile advance as the Division leapfrogged west, seizing key hilltops as fire support bases along Route 9 so the Marines could continue pushing forward. At 08:00 hours April 8, members of the 2nd Battalion, 7th Cavalry Regiment, 1st Cavalry Division, linked-up with the Marines at the combat base, ending the 77-day siege.

== Operation Delaware: Air Assault into A Shau Valley ==
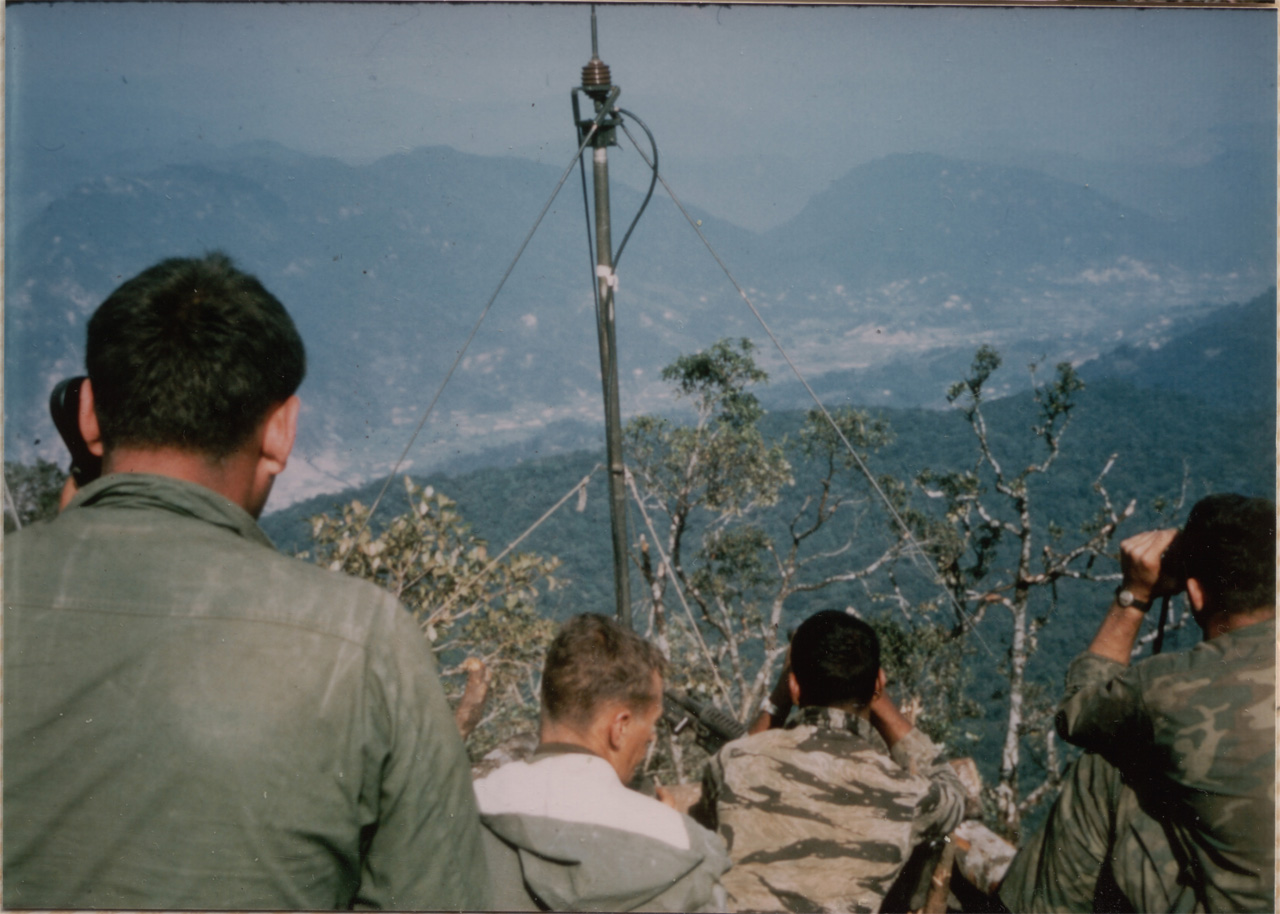
LRPs on Signal Hill directing artillery on enemy trucks in valley.

On April 19, 1968, as the 2nd Brigade continued leapfrogging west to the Laotian border, the 1st and 3rd Brigades (about 11,000 men and 300 helicopters) swung southwest and air assaulted A Shau Valley, commencing Operation Delaware. Since satellite communications were a thing of the future, a daring long-range penetration operation was launched by members of Company E, 52nd Infantry (LRP) against the North Vietnamese Army when they rappelled from six helicopters and seized "Signal Hill" the name attributed to the peak of Dong Re Lao Mountain, a densely forested 4,879-foot mountain, midway in the valley, so the 1st and 3rd Brigades could communicate with Camp Evans near the coast or with approaching aircraft.

== Operation Jeb Stuart III ==
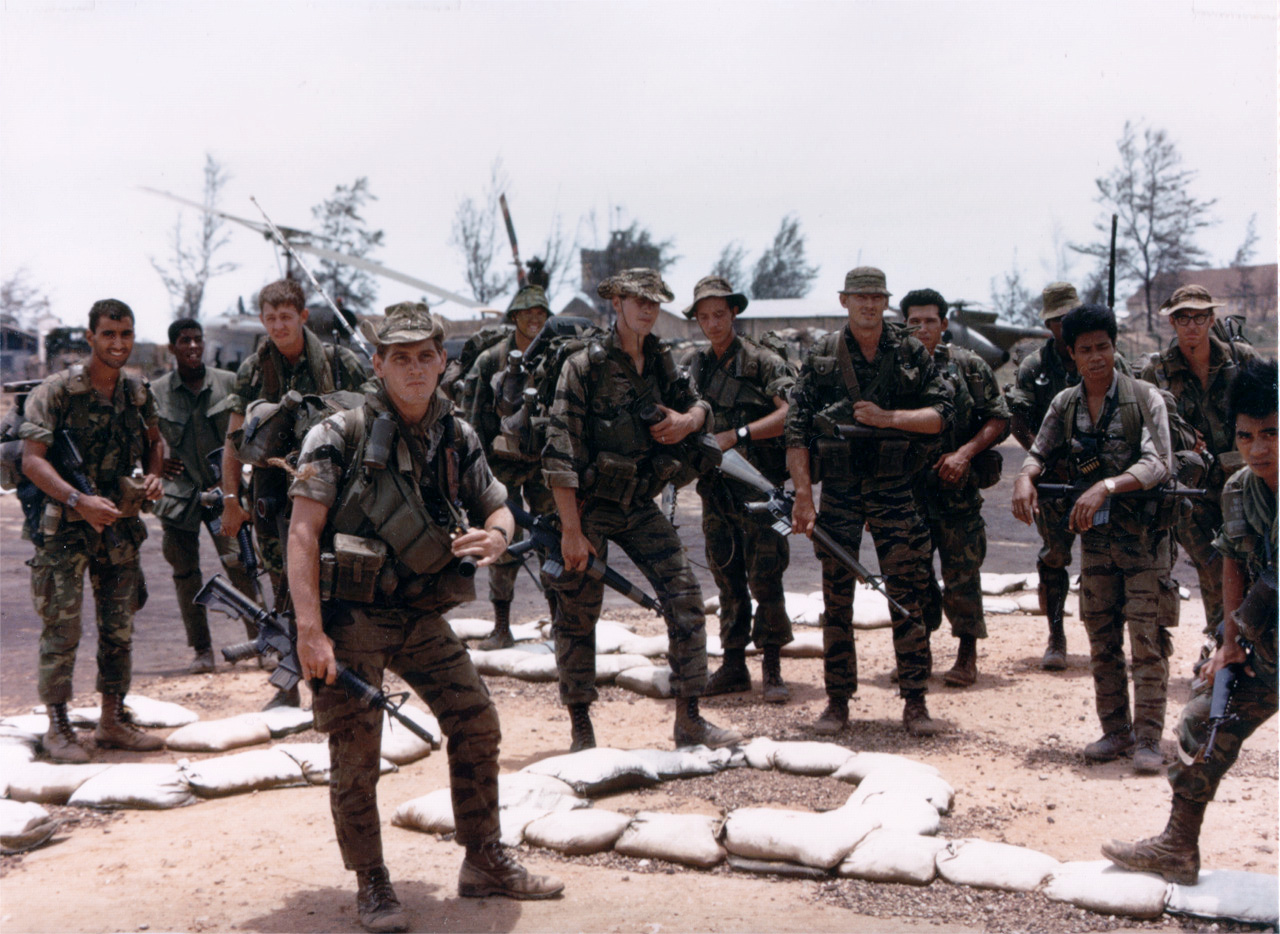
July 26, 1968. Two 1st Cav LRP teams, Quang Tri, Vietnam. Sgt. Walter "Spanky" Seymour in foreground and Cpl. Gair Anderson, sixth from right.

On May 17, 1968, Operation Jeb Stuart III commenced in Quảng Trị and Thừa Thiên Provinces from Huế City up to the DMZ. By this date the 1st Cavalry Division had completed its mission in A Shau Valley, disrupting the flow of troops and supplies from North Vietnam through Laos, and resumed security operations in the eastern regions of these two provinces. Operation Jeb Stuart III continued until November 3, 1968, when the division moved south near Cambodia in Operation Liberty Canyon.

== Aftermath and lineage to 75th Ranger Regiment ==
The 1st Cavalry Division would end the Vietnam War suffering more casualties than any other army division: 5,444 men killed in action and 26,592 wounded in action. Company E (LRP), 52nd Infantry Regiment, redesignated Company H (Ranger), 75th Infantry, participated in the two largest battles of the Vietnam War—the Tet Offensive and the siege of Khe Sanh—and air-assaulted into A Shau Valley, the most formidable enemy-held territory in South Vietnam. It became the most decorated and longest-serving unit in LRP/Ranger history. Company H also fought in Cambodia, and it lost the last two Rangers of the Vietnam War, Sgt. Elvis Weldon Osborne, Jr., and Cpl. Jeffery Alan Maurer on June 9, 1972.

Sgt. Osborne and Cpl. Maurer were on a reconnaissance mission near Tan Uyen in the Binh Duong Province about 20 miles northwest of Saigon. Led by Osborne, Team 76, was doing bomb damage assessment after an airstrike when either a rocket or command-detonated device claimed their lives. Sgt. Osborne and Cpl. Maurer were among the last US Army infantrymen killed by enemy action in the war.

H Company ceased combat operations by mid-July 1972. A month later, on August 15, it was inactivated, the last US Ranger unit to serve in Vietnam. Over 1,000 men served in the First Cav LRRP/Rangers in Vietnam. More than half were wounded yet only 35 were killed in action. It is credited with the longest continuous combat tenure of any Ranger outfit in US military history.

In 1974 Company H (Ranger), 75th Infantry colors and lineage was passed to the 2nd Ranger Battalion, 75th Ranger Regiment.

== Company E in film ==
Oliver Stone's movie Platoon (1986) was based partially on his experiences in the unit. Stone served as a rifleman in both the 25th Infantry Division and the 1st Cavalry Division. In March 1968 Oliver Stone and Gair Anderson volunteered for the 1st Cavalry Division's Long Range Reconnaissance Patrol training, but Stone was dropped from the unit after completing the course. Platoon depicts two soldiers from 2nd Platoon, Company E, 52nd Infantry (LRP), specifically, S/Sgt. John Barnes portrayed by Tom Berenger and Sgt. Juan Angel Elias portrayed by Willem Dafoe. Stone melds his experience as an infantryman and the characters of Barnes and Elias through the eyes of a green young soldier, Charlie Sheen. The film shows troops of Bravo Company, 3rd Battalion, 22nd Infantry Regiment in 1967/1968.

Sgt. Barnes honorably retired from the US Army as a Sergeant Major. Sgt. Elias was killed in action in Quang Tri Province on May 29, 1968, when a grenade he and his team were rigging as a booby trap on an enemy trail accidentally exploded causing the loss of his life and that of Cpl. Donald Robert Miller, and fellow team member, Sgt. Larry Curtis, to lose an eye.

== See also ==
- Air assault
- Battle of Signal Hill (Vietnam)
- 1st Cavalry Division (Airmobile)
- Long Range Reconnaissance Patrol
- Operation Delaware
- Recondo School
- 2nd Ranger Battalion--Company E lineage passed to
- 75th Ranger Regiment
- US Army Rangers
- US Army Reconnaissance and Surveillance Leaders Course
