= Operation Jeb Stuart III =

Part of the Vietnam War (1968)

- Part of the Vietnam War
Date	17 May – 3 November 1968
Location	Quảng Trị and Thừa Thiên Provinces, South Vietnam
Result	U.S. operational success

Belligerents
United States	North Vietnam

Commanders and leaders
MG John J. Tolson; MG George I. Forsythe	

Units involved
1st Cavalry Division	

Casualties and losses
222 killed	2,014 killed 251 captured 1,078 individual and 124 crew-served weapons recovered

Operation Jeb Stuart III was a U.S. Army operation during the Vietnam War conducted by the 1st Cavalry Division. It took place in Quảng Trị and Thừa Thiên Provinces of I Corps, South Vietnam from 17 May to 3 November 1968.

== Background ==
Following the completion of Operation Pegasus (1–14 April), Operation Delaware from 19 April to 17 May and Operation Concordia Square (8–17 May), the 1st Cavalry Division returned to the coastal lowlands of Quảng Trị and Thừa Thiên Provinces. The objective was to engage People's Army of Vietnam (PAVN) forces in their Base Areas 101 and 114, located west of Quảng Trị and Huế. This was originally the objective of Operation Jeb Stuart, but the Tet Offensive had disrupted these plans, leading the Division to participate in the Battle of Quang Tri and the Battle of Huế.

== Operation ==
=== May ===
On 21 May a unit of the 2nd Brigade received mortar fire and called in airstrikes on the firing positions. A search of the area found 12 PAVN dead. On 28 May a unit of the 1st Brigade received fire from a PAVN force in bunkers and attacked the position killing 11. On 29 May units of the 1st Brigade found 26 PAVN dead 6 miles (9.7 km) northeast of Quảng Trị. Operational results to the end of May were 228 PAVN killed and 33 individual and six crew-served weapons captured. U.S. losses were 51 killed.

=== June ===
On 4 June at 09:15 Division helicopter gunships attacked a PAVN force 10 miles (16 km) northwest of Huế killing 14. A Popular Force (PF) unit then swept the area killing a further 13. On 18 June at 06:10 Camp Evans was hit by five 122 mm rockets causing minimal damage. On 19 June at 19:30 Division aerial observers saw two PAVN companies 24 miles (39 km) west of Huế and directed artillery and airstrikes onto the area killing 25. On 24 June a unit of the 1st Brigade found 15 PAVN bodies in graves 9 miles (14 km) south of Quảng Trị.

On 27 June at 09:05 the 3rd Battalion, 5th Cavalry Regiment, while patrolling near the hamlet of Binh An, 17 km east of Đông Hà, received heavy automatic weapons fire. Villagers fleeing from the hamlet reported that PAVN soldiers were hidden there in bunkers. A PAVN soldier, captured by the troopers, estimated that at least 200 soldiers were in the village. By 11:30 naval gunfire was placed on the target area by a Task Force in the South China Sea. USS Boston fired more than 300 rounds of 8-inch gunfire and more than 640 rounds of 5-inch gunfire into the area. The USS O'Brien fired over 1,390 rounds of 5-inch gunfire tire into the position. In addition, 26 tactical air strikes were flown by United States Marine Corps aircraft from Marine Aircraft Group 12 and the United States Air Force (USAF) 366th Tactical Fighter Wing onto the PAVN positions. Helicopter gunships from the 229th Assault Helicopter Battalion and the 2nd Battalion, 20th Artillery, fired more than 200 2.75-inch rockets at the position. Artillery support was provided by the 1st Battalion, 6th Marines. On the evening of the 27th, three companies from the 3/5th Cavalry were reinforced by a company from the 1/5th Cavalry, a company from the 2/5th Cavalry and a troop from the 2nd Squadron, 9th Cavalry Regiment completing a horseshoe cordon around the PAVN position. Contact was lost at 19:45 During the next two days, elements of the 3/5th Cavalry, reinforced by engineers, swept the area using APCs and bulldozers to destroy the bunkers and trench system. At the end of the sweep 225 PAVN dead bodies were counted. In addition 38 were captured and 64 individual and 14 crew-served weapons were captured. U.S. losses were three killed.

Cumulative operational results to the end of June were 756 PAVN killed and 330 individual and 45 crew-served weapons captured. U.S. losses were 104 killed.

=== July ===
On 5 July at 18:30 a company from the 3rd Brigade engaged a PAVN platoon 5 miles (8.0 km) east of Quảng Trị killing 11 while losing one killed. On 9 July a USAF F-100 Super Sabre crashed 10 miles (16 km) southwest of Đông Hà. On 12 July an OH-6 Cayuse was shot down 6 miles (9.7 km) south of Quảng Trị. On 13 July at 11:00 helicopter gunships of the 1/9th Cavalry engaged a PAVN force 9 miles (14 km) south-southwest of Quảng Trị killing 14. On 17 July a company from the Division found the graves of 13 PAVN killed by artillery 2–3 weeks earlier. On 21 July a UH-1 Iroquois was shot down 11 miles (18 km) southwest of Camp Evans killing four on board. On 24 July at 13:15 a unit of the 2nd Brigade patrolling 22 miles (35 km) west-southwest of Huế found a munitions cache containing 75 RPG-2 grenades, 5353 82 mm mortar rounds, 290 60 mm mortar rounds and 89,000 rounds of 7.62×39mm ammunition. At 18:00 a Division unit engaged a PAVN force 24 miles (39 km) southwest of Huế killing 11; U.S. losses were seven killed. On 25 July at 09:00 a unit of the 1/9th Cavalry killed 11 PAVN 7 miles (11 km) northeast of Quảng Trị. Later that day a unit of the Division found a munitions cache 21 miles (34 km) west of Huế containing 35 RPG-2 grenades and other munitions. Another unit found 34 hospital huts nearby and another unit found another munitions cache 1 mile (1.6 km) away containing 246 60 mm mortar rounds. On 29 July a unit of the 3rd Brigade engaged an enemy force losing four killed.

Cumulative operational results to the end of July were 1,198 PAVN killed and 601 individual and 80 crew-served weapons captured. U.S. losses were 151 killed.

=== August ===
On 2 August an OH-6 was shot down 25 miles (40 km) southwest of Huế. An F-100 was shot down 32 miles (51 km) west of Huế. On 3 August a UH-1 was shot down 12 miles (19 km) southwest of Quảng Trị killing one on board. On 7 August a unit of the 2nd Brigade found a bunker complex and weapons cache 19 miles (31 km) west-southwest of Huế containing four SKS rifles, five 82 mm mortars, one 60 mm mortar, two 12.7mm machine guns and three light machine guns. A division unit operating with Regional Forces (RF) engaged a PAVN force 12 miles east of Quảng Trị killing 11 and capturing one and four individual weapons. On 9 August an OH-6 was shot down 19 miles north-northwest of Huế. On 11 August an OH-13 observation helicopter was shot down 5 miles (8.0 km) northeast of Quảng Trị. On 15 August a UH-1 on a medevac mission was hit by an RPG-2 9 miles (14 km) south of Quảng Trị.

On 16 August a 3rd Brigade base camp 10 miles (16 km) south-southeast of Quảng Trị was hit by 100 rounds of 82 mm mortar fire followed by a ground attack. PAVN losses were 17 killed and two captured, U.S. losses were 18 killed. An OH-6 was shot down 16 miles (26 km) south of Huế killing one crewman. On 17 August a unit of the 2nd Brigade and PF forces operating 12 miles (19 km) northwest of Huế killed 19 PAVN and captured seven and five individual weapons. On 20 August at 14:00 helicopters of the 1/9th Cavalry received fire 4 miles (6.4 km) northeast of Quảng Trị, the 2nd Brigade was air-assaulted into the area to engage the force and six helicopters were shot down with a further three shot down during the day. The 2nd Brigade killed 66 PAVN and captured nine; U.S. losses were three killed. On 23 August aeroscouts from the 3rd Brigade saw a PAVN force 6 miles (9.7 km) south of Quảng Trị and directed helicopter gunships and airstrikes onto the area killing 35. A unit of the 1st Brigade found 85 PAVN dead in bunkers 4 miles northeast of Quảng Trị. On 29 August a unit of the 3rd Brigade found 12 PAVN dead 12 miles west of Huế.

Cumulative operational results to the end of August were 1,742 PAVN killed and 819 individual and 118 crew-served weapons captured. U.S. losses were 197 killed.

=== September ===
On 14 September an OH-6 was shot down 24 miles (39 km) west-northwest of Huế. On 18 September a USAF O-1 Bird Dog forward air controller (FAC) was shot down 6 miles (9.7 km) west of Huế. On 26 September at 16:00 an OH-6 was shot down 10 miles (16 km) south of Quảng Trị killing four on board. Cumulative operational results to the end of September were 1,888 PAVN killed and 922 individual and 119 crew-served weapons captured. U.S. losses were 208 killed.

=== October ===
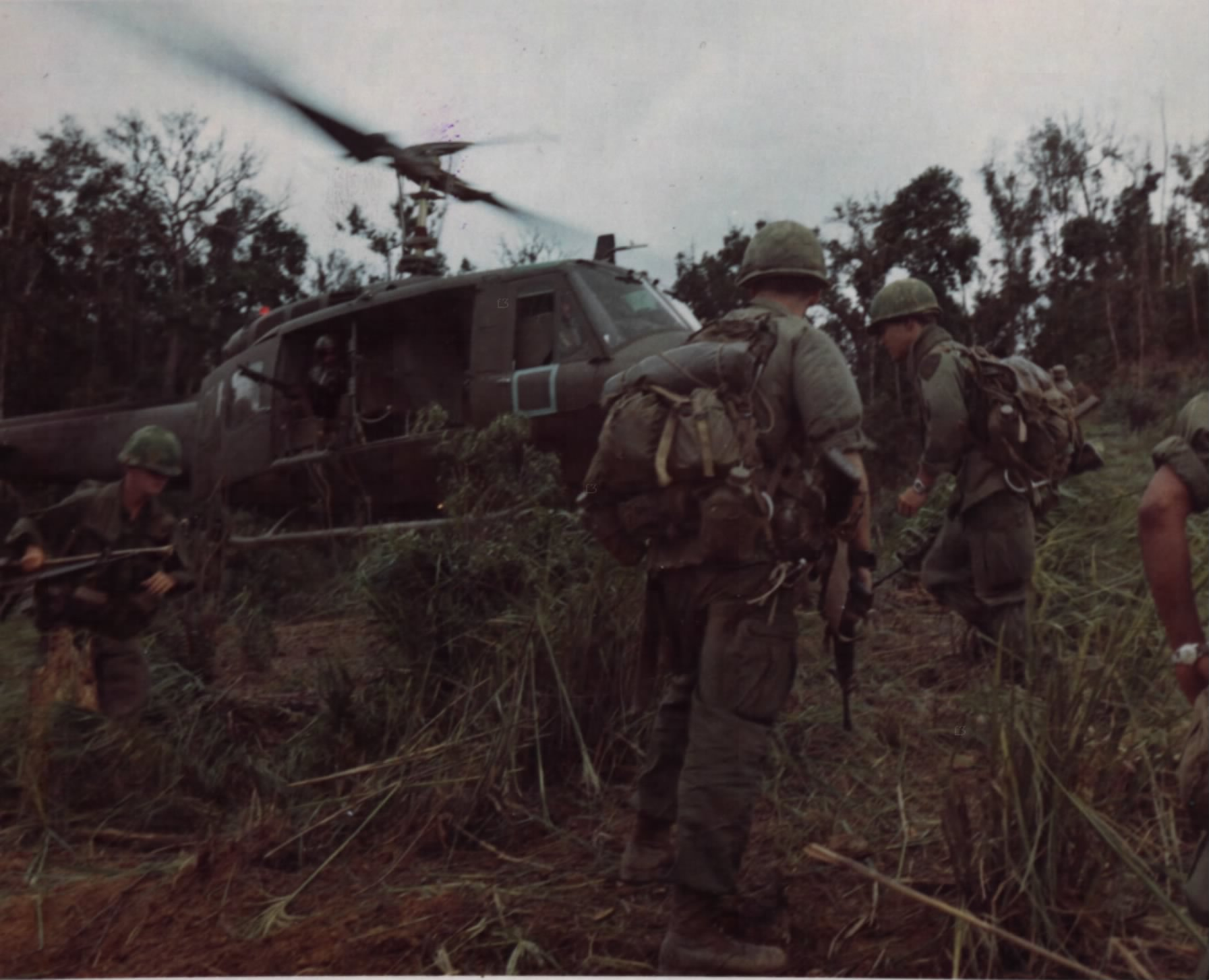
Men of Company "A", 2nd Battalion, 8th Cavalry, jump from a UH-1D helicopter into a mountainous area located approximately 10 km from Quang Tri, 13 October 1968

On 7 October at 11:30 troops from the 1/9th Cavalry found a munitions cache 17 miles (27 km) southwest of Quảng Trị containing 12 SKS, 15,000 rounds of small arms ammunition, 40 120 mm mortar rounds and 40 82 mm mortar rounds. At 12:50 a unit of the 3rd Brigade found a medical supply cache 22 miles (35 km) west of Huế. On 9 October a Division unit found a weapons cache 13 miles (21 km) south of Quảng Trị containing 13 AK-47s, six SKS and three submachine guns and assorted munitions. On 10 October a UH-1 was shot down 17 miles (27 km) southwest of Quảng Trị. On 20 October at 14:30 a company from the 1st Brigade and PF forces engaged a PAVN force 4 miles (6.4 km) north-northeast of Quảng Trị killing 11 and capturing 21 and three individual weapons. On 24 October an F-100 was shot down 11 miles (18 km) north of Huế. On 29 October at 18:00 an O-1 was shot down 10 miles (16 km) west-northwest of Huế, killing both crewmen.

== Aftermath ==
On 28 October the division began Operation Liberty Canyon moving south from I Corps to III Corps to join Operation Toan Thang II. The operation terminated on 3 November. Cumulative operational results were 2,014 PAVN killed and 251 captured and 1,078 individual and 124 crew-served weapons captured. U.S. losses were 222 killed.
