= Battle of Signal Hill (Vietnam) =

Company size engagement of the Vietnam War

Coordinates: 16.3038°N 107.2479°E

The Battle of Signal Hill was a company size engagement between members of Company E, 52nd Infantry (LRP) long-range reconnaissance patrol of the 1st Cavalry Division (Airmobile) and the People's Army of Vietnam (PAVN) from 19 to 21 April 1968 during Operation Delaware. Signal Hill was the name given to the peak of Dong Re Lao Mountain, a densely forested 4,878-foot (1,487 m) mountain in the A Sầu Valley. The strategic location made it an ideal communication and fire support site, vital to the success of Operation Delaware.

== Background ==
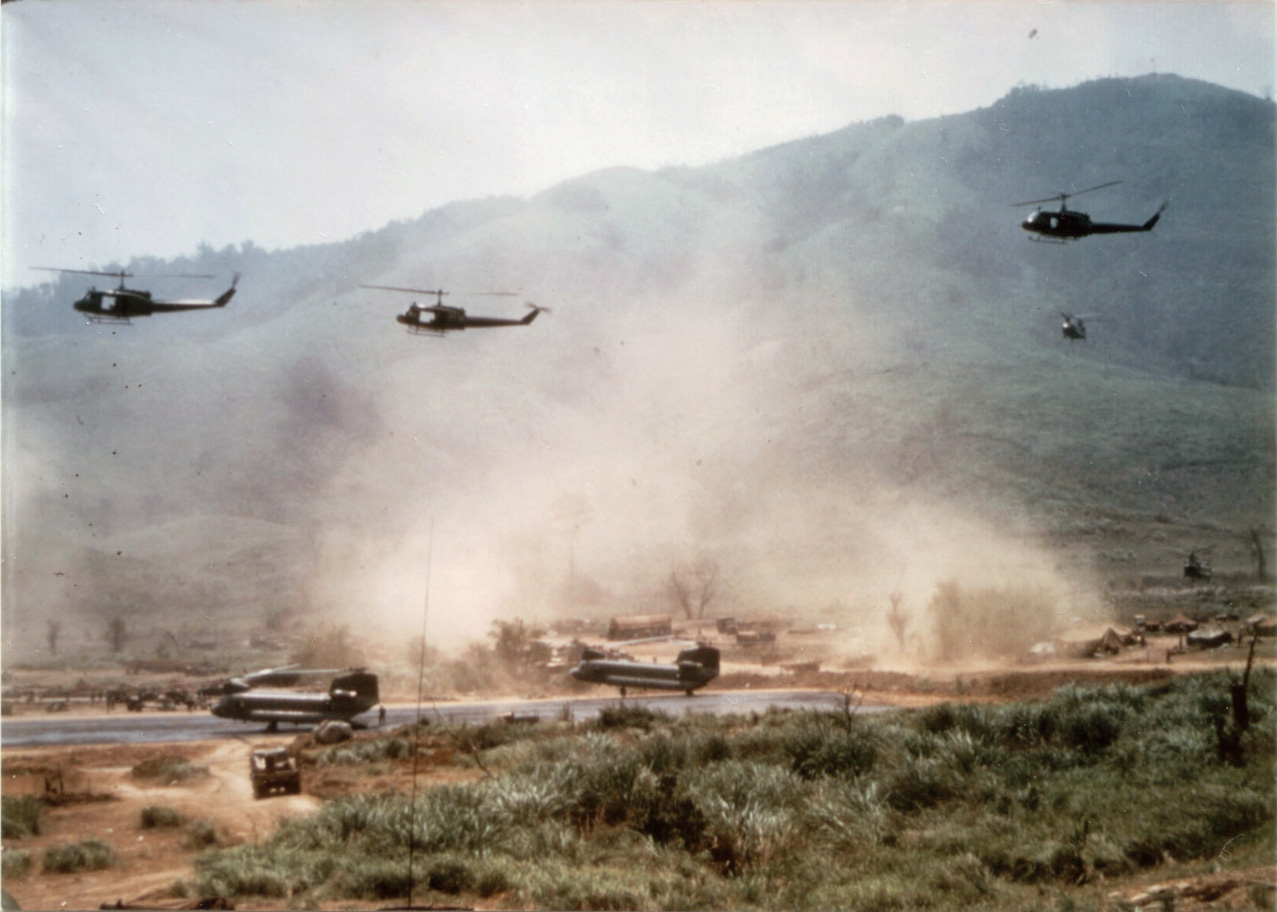
1st Cav forces at LZ Stud during Operation Pegasus

The PAVN gained control of the A Sầu Valley in March 1966 after overrunning the last Special Forces camp in the area. They then fortified the valley with powerful crew-served 37mm antiaircraft cannons, some of them radar controlled. They also emplaced rapid firing twin-barreled 23mm cannons and many 12.7mm heavy machine guns to contribute to their air defenses. The A Sầu Valley soon evolved into a major logistics depot for the PAVN, with storage locations often located in underground bunkers and tunnels. Because of this strength on the ground, and the relative geographic isolation of the valley, the United States and its allies conducted little offensive activity in the area except for air attacks, and those were limited by the steep, mountainous terrain often cloaked under clouds, prone to sudden, violent changes in weather. In addition, because of the very limited air mobility of the Marines in I Corps, no ground operations of any significance had been launched in the A Sầu.

By early April 1968, the PAVN had just suffered casualties of more than 40,000 men in two major military campaigns: the Tet Offensive and at Khe Sanh. But the PAVN still had the ability to regain the initiative in I Corps. That ability came in part from isolated base areas like the sparsely populated A Sầu Valley, running north–south along the Laotian border 30 miles (48 km) south of Khe Sanh, where troops and supplies were moved into South Vietnam as the PAVN prepared for another battle—at a time and place of its choosing. The A Sầu, a mile-wide bottomland flanked by densely forested 5,000-foot (1,500 m) mountains, was bisected lengthwise by Route 548, a hard-crusted dirt road. A branch of the Ho Chi Minh Trail, the valley was a key NVA sanctuary.

== Battle ==
In January 1968 Military Assistance Command, Vietnam, ordered the 1st Cavalry Division (Airmobile) to move north from the Central Highlands to support the Marines. The 1st Cavalry Division, an airmobile division with 20,000 men and nearly 450 helicopters, had the most firepower and mobility of any division-size unit in Vietnam. When it arrived in I Corps, the 1st Cavalry Division fought toe-to-toe with the enemy during Tet. It was fully engaged in Operation Pegasus, the relief of Khe Sanh when its commander, Maj. Gen. John J. Tolson, was ordered to prepare plans for Operation Delaware, a massive air assault into the A Sầu Valley.

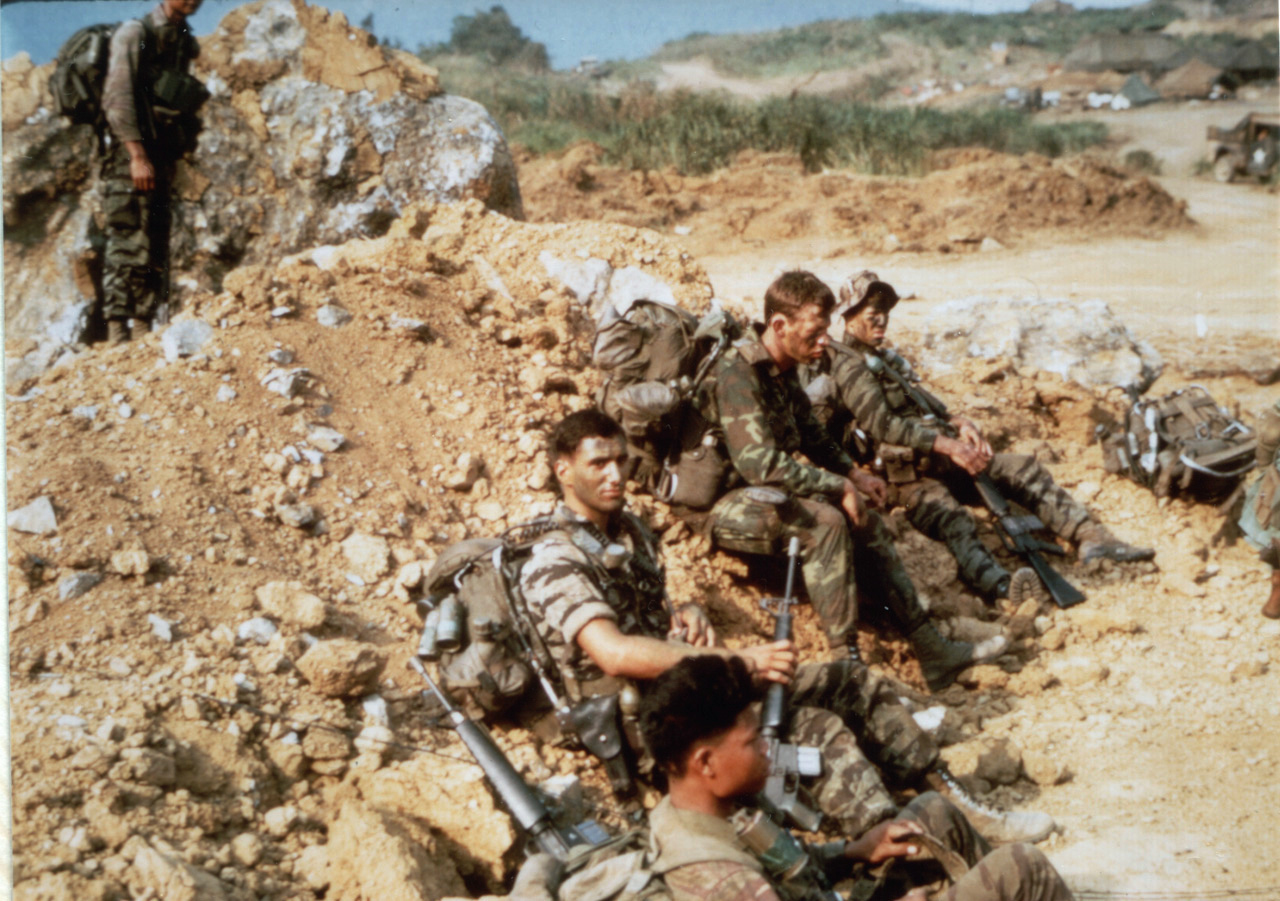
April 7, 1968 members of the LRRP assault team

Two brigades—about 11,000 men and 300 helicopters—would attack the north end of the 25 miles (40 km)-long valley and leapfrog their way south, while another brigade would stay at Khe Sanh, providing security from the combat base to the Laotian border. The operation required a radio relay site so the engaged brigades could communicate with Camp Evans near the coast or with approaching aircraft. On the eastern side, midway up the valley, was a perfect spot: the 4,878-foot (1,487 m) Dong Re Lao Mountain. The 1st Cavalry Division's headquarters dubbed it "Signal Hill."

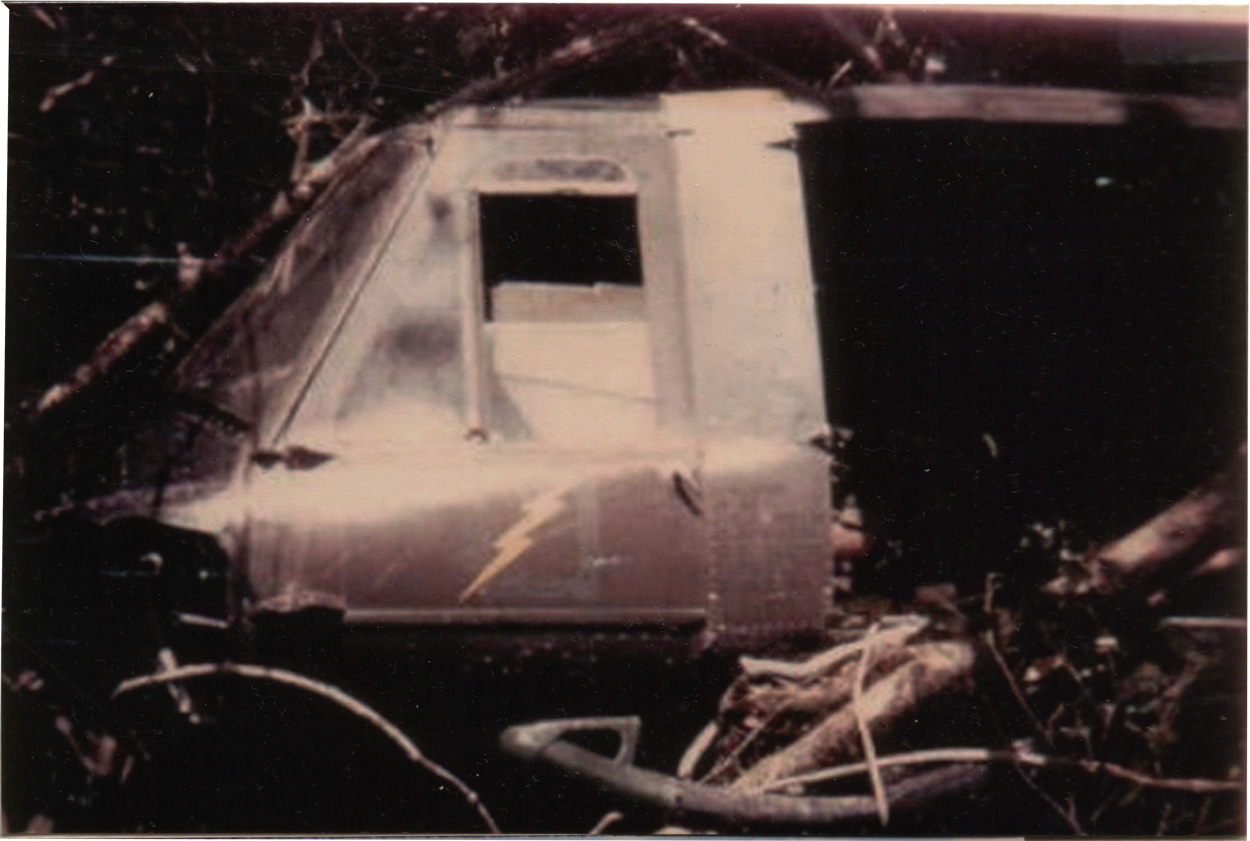
April 19, 1968, crashed UH-1 on Signal Hill

Since the mission required specially trained and equipped men who could rappel from helicopters, clear a landing zone with explosives, and hold the ground far from artillery support, the division's long-range reconnaissance patrol (LRRP, or "Lurp") unit was the logical choice. As a result, the mission to secure Signal Hill would first fall to Company E, 52nd Infantry (LRP).

On the morning of Friday 19 April, the 30-man LRRP platoon gathered with several engineers and signalmen at Camp Evans, awaiting flights to Signal Hill, 19 miles (31 km) away. Five UH-1 helicopters (known as "slicks" based on their transport role) from the 227th Assault Helicopter Battalion provided transport for the strike force. With every unit requesting lift ships, many of which were undergoing repair or still at Khe Sanh, not enough helicopters were available to bring in the entire platoon, so one team was told to wait for a second lift. The helicopters landed, and everyone else clambered aboard, heavily laden with gear. The helicopters reached Signal Hill some 20 minutes later.

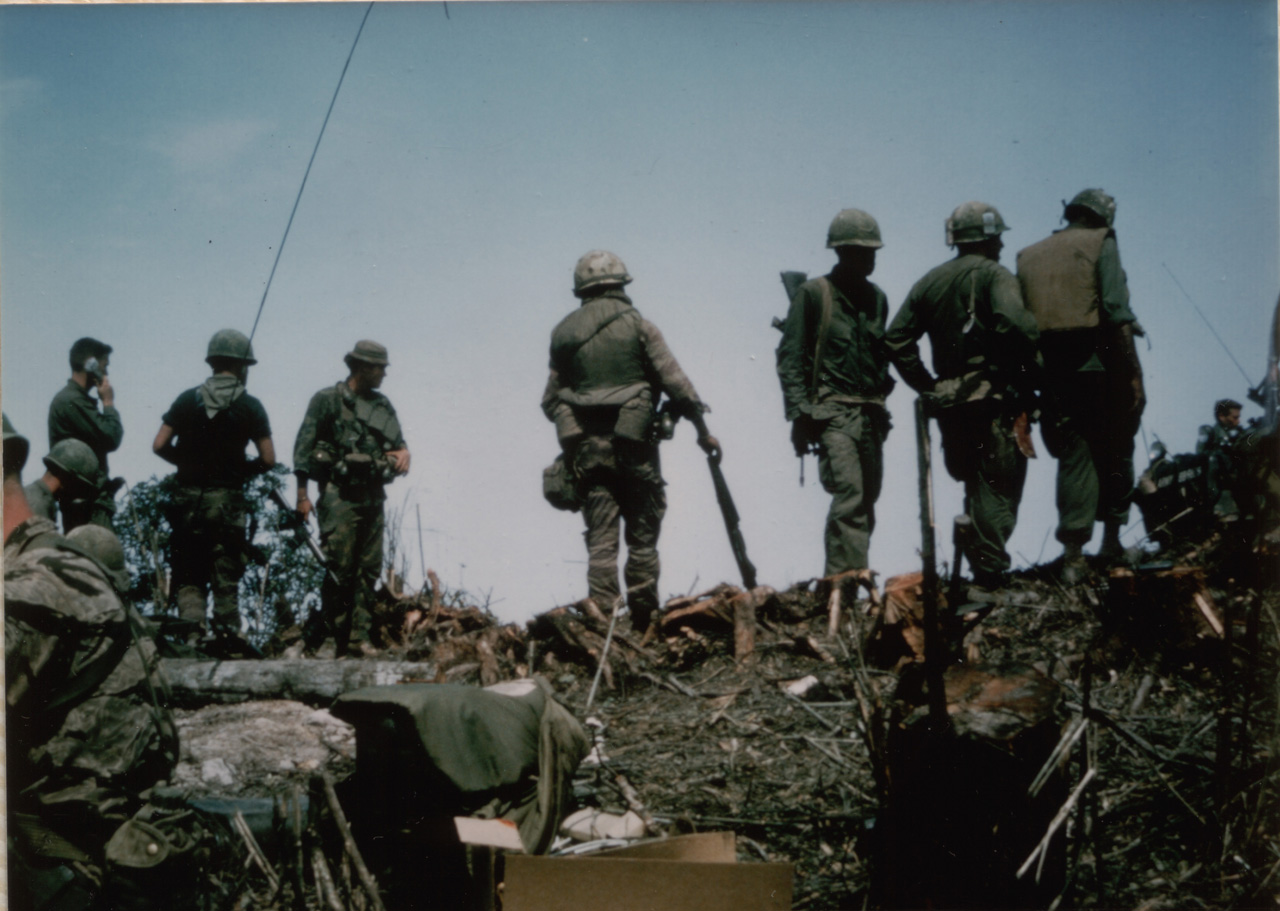
LRRPs after securing Signal Hill

As planned, the small force of helicopters came to a hover 100 feet (30 m) above the dense jungle, and the men started rappelling down to clear a landing zone. But in the thinner atmosphere at that altitude, the helicopter engines had less lift. As a result, the helicopter lost control and careened through the canopy and crashed to the jungle floor. The impact knocked the crew and the remaining men on board unconscious. One soldier suffered a concussion and was pinned under a skid when the helicopter rolled on its side; as he struggled to get free, the chopper's engine revved at full throttle and started leaking fuel. Despite the initial chaos, the rest of the team retrieved the crates of explosives and gear being slung down and then established a defensive perimeter around the peak. Once unloaded, the four helicopters still in the air quickly sped away to avoid further engine strain and the others could mount a belated rescue. After digging the trapped man out from beneath the skid and moving the injured to safety, they began the grueling task of clearing a landing zone (LZ), using chain saws and bangalore torpedoes. The insertion and clearing work had not gone unnoticed, and soon PAVN elements began moving toward the LRRP position.

By morning on 20 April there still was not an adequate clearing for a helicopter to land, so the injured had to be lifted out on a McGuire rig. As the assault force worked to clear an LZ, PAVN soldiers moved up from the valley floor, reaching the mountaintop at noon. Hidden by dense foliage and scattered debris, and with their approach masked by the noise of explosives and chain saws, they were able to close on the perimeter, shooting at the members of the unit still struggling to make a suitable LZ.

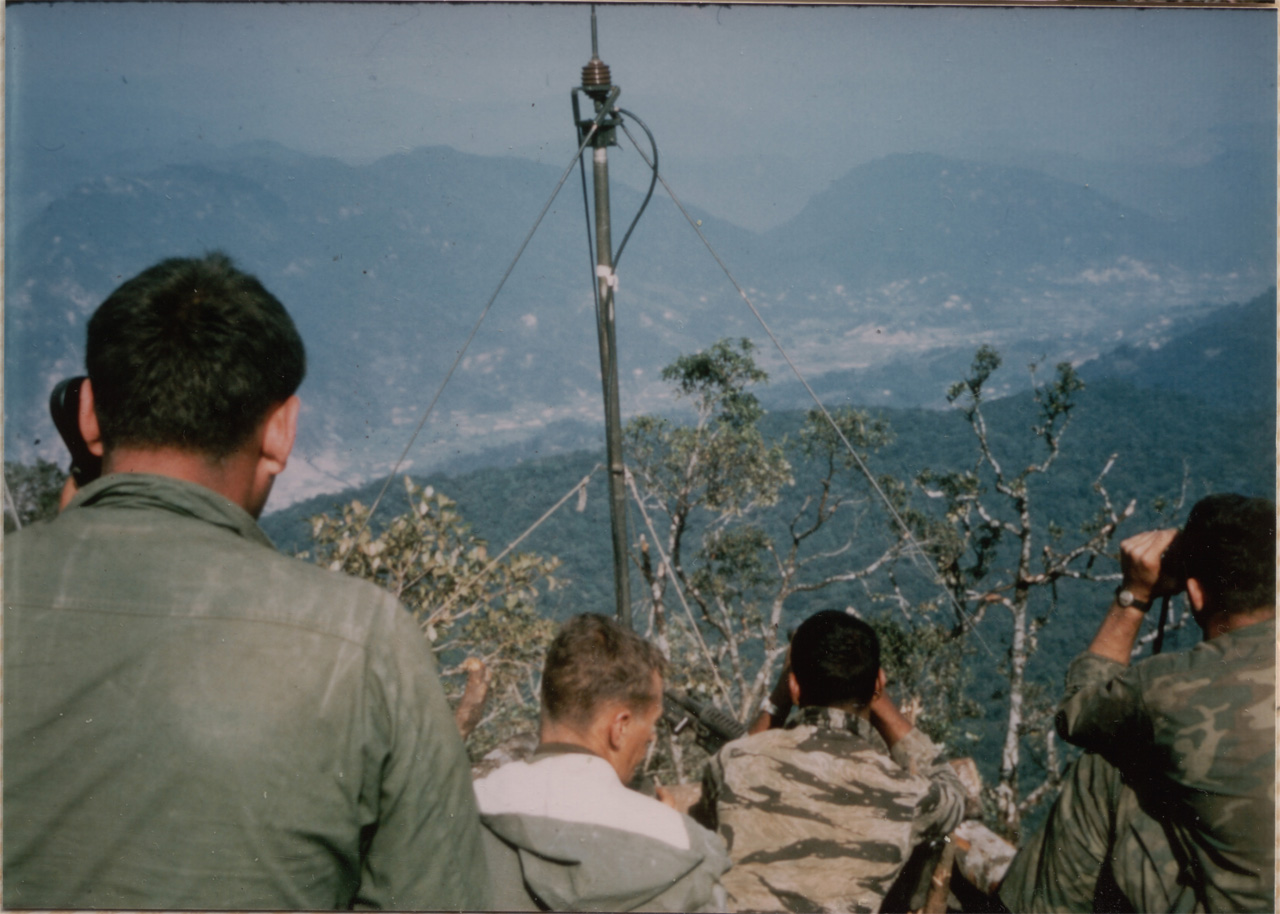
LRRPs on Signal Hill directing artillery on enemy trucks in the valley

Unable to see the snipers, the assault force threw grenades down the slope and fired their weapons at suspected targets, keeping the enemy at bay. As the battle dragged on, a casualty collection point was established at the top of the peak in the shelter of a bomb crater. The seriously wounded were given plasma expanders to replace lost blood, cloth-wrapped plastic bandages to cover sucking chest wounds, or morphine injections to ease the pain. The assault force made repeated calls to Camp Evans for helicopters to evacuate the wounded, but with two brigades making airmobile assaults far north into the valley, and helicopter losses reaching more than nine shot down on the first day of the operation, none were available for Signal Hill.

By late afternoon a functional LZ was finally cleared, but at a steep cost. Snipers had killed 3 men and seriously wounded a further 3.

Early the next morning, Sunday, 21 April, a medevac helicopter, already loaded with wounded, landed on Signal Hill to evacuate wounded. Soon after the medevac departed, a six-man team arrived as other reinforcements arrived. Since no sweeps had been made to clear the peak of snipers, Captain Gooding ordered a patrol around the peak. They patrol moved down through a dense wall of mud-covered branches and trees, twisted and broken from the demolitions operations used to clear the LZ. They entered dense forest swathed in a thick blanket of fog surrounding the peak. After an hour, a lone PAVN soldier stood and called to the patrol's front scout, an indigenous Montagnard, thinking he was a fellow PAVN soldier. Instantly realizing his mistake, the soldier stood shocked, arms at his sides, mouth and eyes open, as the patrol members raised their rifles and shot him.

In the following days, Signal Hill was secured. A battery of artillery was airlifted on top to support the infantry in the valley, and another helicopter crashed on the peak, its rotors narrowly missing two Lurps; however, one soldier was fatally crushed beneath the skid. Another soldier was slammed in the chest by a sailing fuel can, and another man, an air force meteorologist, had his leg and feet severed.

== Aftermath ==
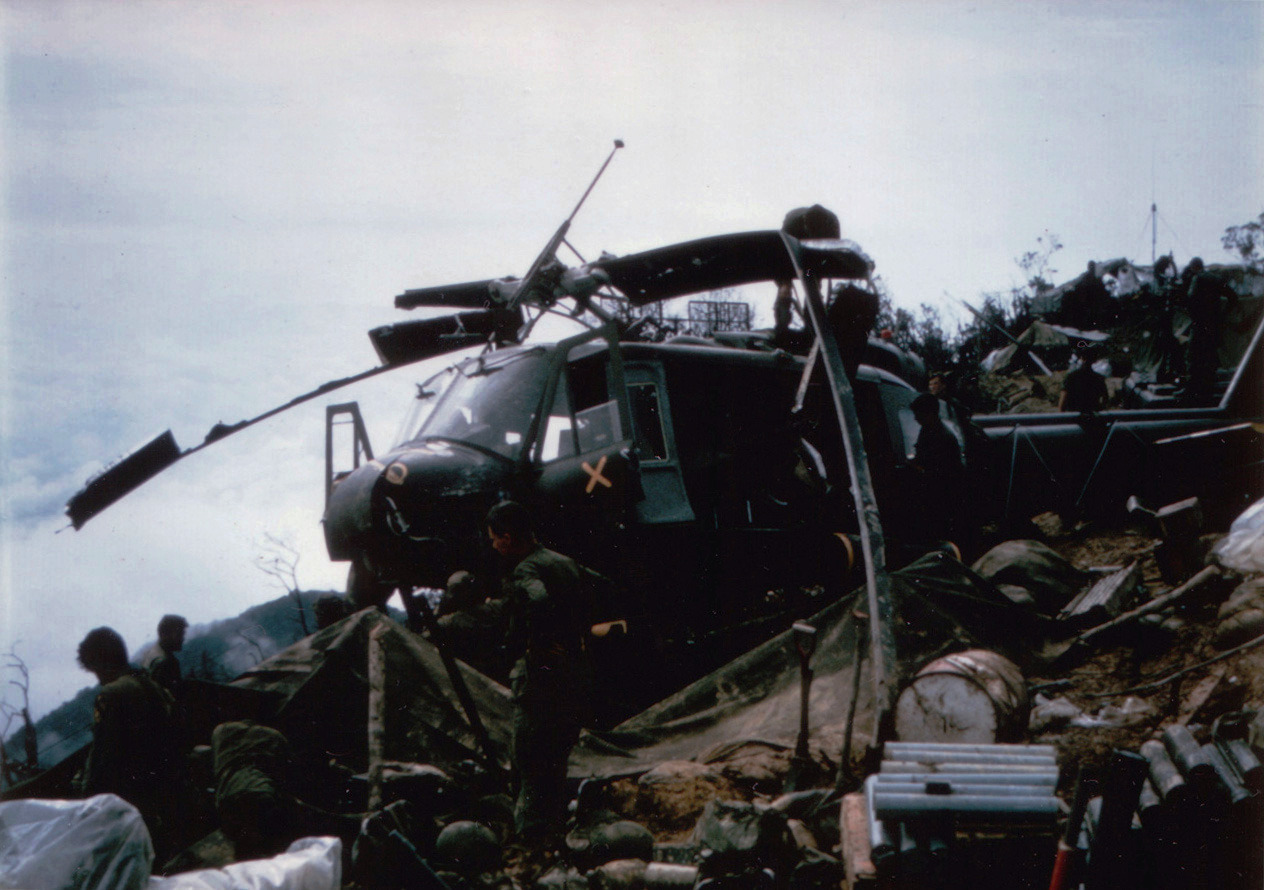
This UH-1 crashed on Signal Hill killing one man and severely injuring two

The LRRPs held Signal Hill for close to three weeks, providing a vital fire support base and radio relay site for the troops in the valley to communicate with Camp Evans and with approaching aircraft. Their action saved American lives and helped ensure the success of Operation Delaware by allowing coordinated air and ground attacks, timely artillery strikes, and air rescues of wounded infantrymen and downed aircrews. From their commanding position the LRRPs could see for miles in the cool, thin air, from the distant warships in the South China Sea 30 miles (48 km) to the east to the mountains in neutral Laos 7 miles (11 km) to the west.

Despite hundreds of B-52 and jet air strikes to destroy the most sophisticated enemy antiaircraft network yet seen in South Vietnam, the PAVN managed to shoot down a C-130, a CH-54 Skycrane, two CH-47 Chinooks, and nearly two dozen UH-1 Hueys. Many more, though not shot out of the sky, were lost in accidents or damaged by ground fire. The 1st Cavalry Division suffered more than 130 dead and 530 wounded in Operation Delaware. Bad weather aggravated the loss by causing delays in troop movements, allowing a substantial number of PAVN to escape to safety in Laos. Still, the PAVN lost more than 800 dead, a tank, 70 trucks, two bulldozers, 30 flamethrowers, thousands of rifles and machine guns, and dozens of antiaircraft cannons. They also lost tons of ammunition, explosives, medical supplies, foodstuffs, and documents.

== See also ==
- 1st Cavalry Division (Airmobile)
- Battle of Khe Sanh
- Company E, 52nd Infantry (LRP)
- Dong Re Lao Mountain
- Long Range Reconnaissance Patrol
- Operation Delaware
