= A Lưới Camp =

A Lưới Camp Ta Bat Airfield
- Huế, Central Highlands in Vietnam

Site information
- Operator: Army of the Republic of Vietnam (ARVN); United States Army (U.S. Army)
- Condition: Abandoned

Location
- Shown within Vietnam
- Coordinates: 16°16′07″N 107°13′43″E

Site history
- Built: 1962
- Built by: 326th Engineers (1969)
- In use: 1962-1966
- Battles/wars: Vietnam War

Garrison information
- Garrison: 5th Special Forces Group

Airfield information
- Elevation: 0 feet (0 m) AMSL
Runways
Direction	Length and surface
18/36	1,500 feet (457 m) Asphalt

A Lưới Camp (also known as A Lưới Special Forces Camp, LZ Stallion or Ta Bat Airfield) is a former U.S. Army and Army of the Republic of Vietnam (ARVN) base in the A Sầu Valley southwest of Huế in the Central Highlands of Vietnam.

== History ==
The 5th Special Forces Group first established a base here in 1962 to monitor communist infiltration into the A Sầu Valley. The base was located along Route 548, 40 km southwest of Huế.

The base was abandoned in 1966 due to increased pressure from the People's Army of Vietnam (PAVN) forces and the A Sầu Valley became a major PAVN base area supporting operations throughout the Central Highlands.

In April 1968 during Operation Delaware the 1st Cavalry Division briefly reoccupied A Lưới. The 8th Engineer Battalion rebuilt the airfield to handle Fairchild C-123 Provider and Lockheed C-130 Hercules aircraft.

On 26 April 1968 C-130B #60-0298 was hit by enemy fire while on approach to the camp airfield, the aircraft crashed and burnt on the airfield, the remains of 5 of the 8 crewmen were recovered

In August 1968 the 101st Airborne Division briefly reoccupied A Lưới during Operation Somerset Plain.

On 29 April 1969 the 101st Airborne returned to A Lưới during Operation Kentucky Jumper and Ta Bat Airfield was reopened.

== Current use ==
The base has been turned over to housing/farmland and sits adjacent to the Ho Chi Minh Highway.
