= John J. Tolson =

United States Army general (1915–1991)

John J. Tolson III
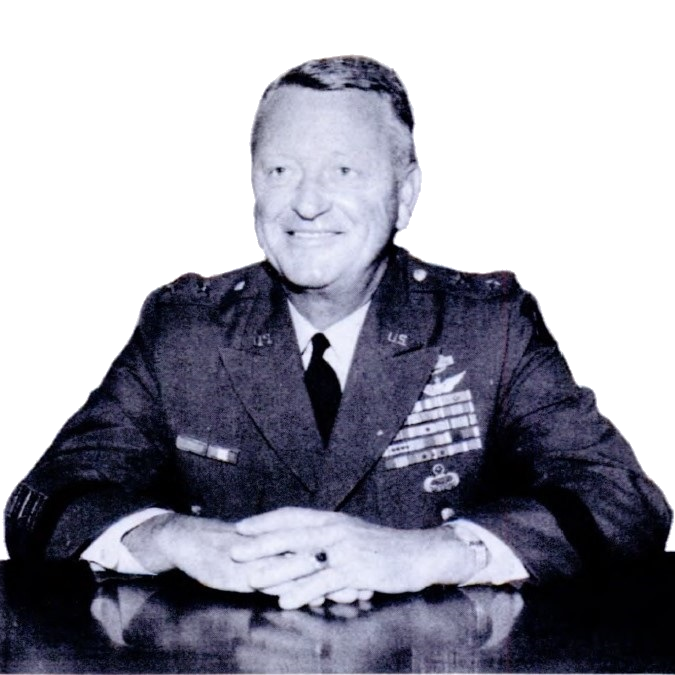
- John J. Tolson III as a Major General
- Born: John Jarvis Tolson III; October 22, 1915; New Bern, North Carolina
- Died: December 2, 1991 (aged 76); Raleigh, North Carolina
- Military career
- Allegiance: United States of America
- Branch: United States Army
- Service years: 1937–1973
- Rank: Lieutenant General
- Nickname: Jack
- Commands: XVIII Airborne Corps; 1st Cavalry Division; Army Aviation Center; 325th Airborne Infantry Regiment
- Conflicts: World War II; Vietnam War
- Awards: Distinguished Service Cross; Distinguished Service Medal (3); Silver Star Medal; Legion of Merit (2); Distinguished Flying Cross; Bronze Star Medal; Purple Heart; Air Medal (5)

John Jarvis Tolson III (October 22, 1915 – December 2, 1991) was a lieutenant general in the United States Army. During the Vietnam War, he helped implement the airmobile concept use of helicopters in combat with the 1st Cavalry Division (Airmobile). Tolson credited the U.S Marines for first using helicopters to transport troops into combat in the Korean War, making the ground fight a three-dimensional war, thus freeing troops from the tyranny of terrain.

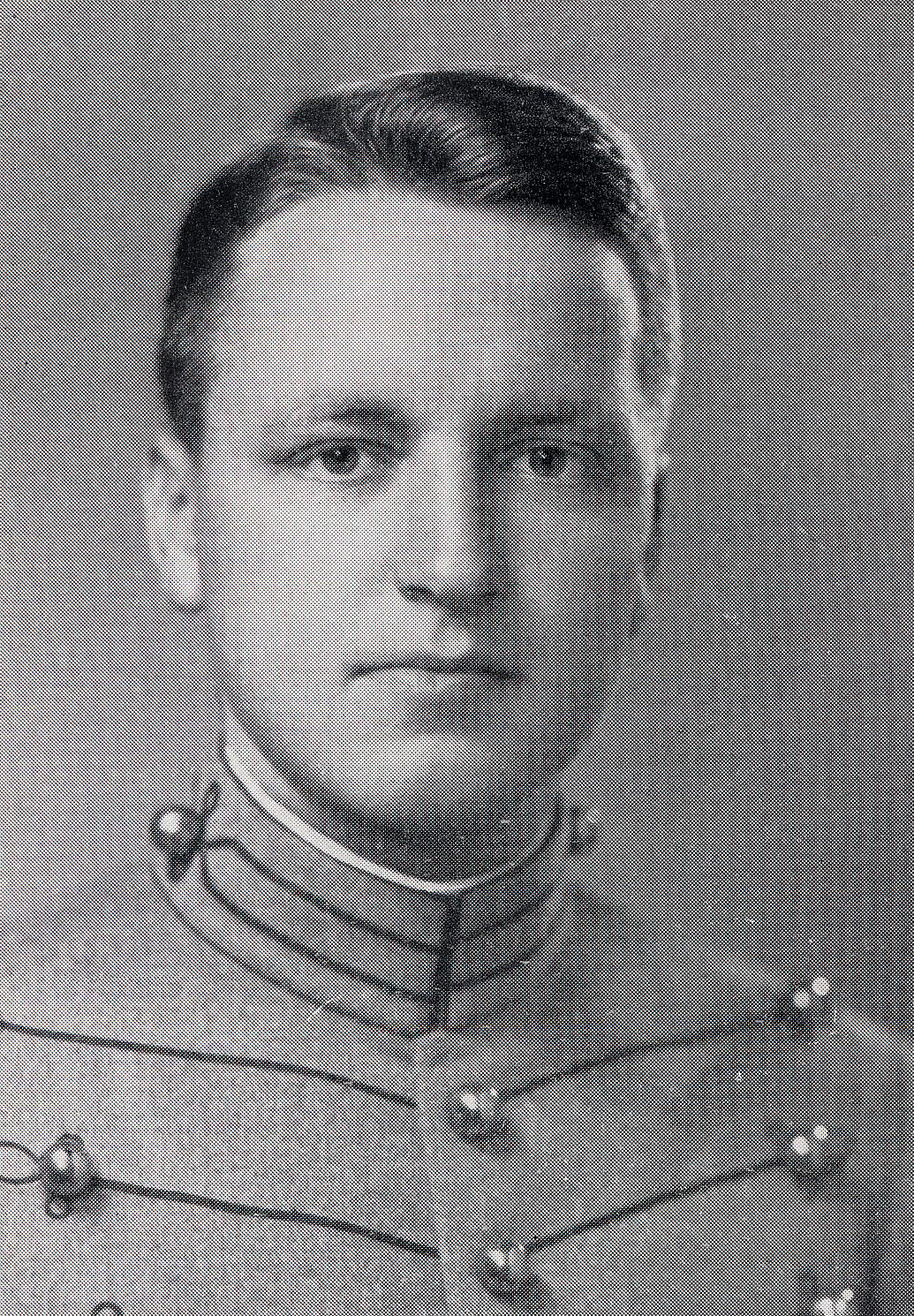
Tolson as a United States Military Academy cadet c. 1937

Born in New Bern, North Carolina, Tolson attended the University of North Carolina for one year before being appointed to the United States Military Academy in 1933. He graduated from West Point with a B.S. degree in 1937 and was commissioned as an infantry officer.

In World War II, John J. Tolson was a member of the 503rd Parachute Infantry Regiment and participated in every jump with that unit, including the recapture of Corregidor in 1945. He was awarded the Silver Star Medal, Bronze Star Medal, Air Medal and Purple Heart. After the war, Tolson was given command of the 325th Airborne Infantry Regiment, 82nd Airborne Division at Fort Bragg.

Tolson graduated from the British Staff College in 1951 and the U.S. Army War College in 1953. He completed fixed-wing and rotary-wing flight training in June 1957. Tolson then served as assistant commandant of the Army Aviation School for two years. He next served as Deputy Director of Army Aviation at the Pentagon until 1961, chief of the U.S. Military Assistance Advisory Group in Addis Ababa, Ethiopia from 1961 to 1963 and then Director of Army Aviation back at the Pentagon from 1963 to 1965. Tolson served as commander of the Army Aviation Center and commandant of the Army Aviation School from March 1965 to March 1967.

In the Vietnam War, Major General Tolson took command of 1st Cavalry Division in April 1967 and served in that capacity till July 14, 1968. Under his command, his division played crucial roles during the Tet Offensive during the Battle of Hue and at Quang Tri City in January 1968. It also participated in the second biggest battle of the war: Operation Pegasus the relief of the Marine Khe Sanh Combat Base in March 1968 where all three brigades engaged the enemy, as well as Operation Delaware, the massive air assault into the A Shau Valley in April 1968. He was awarded the Distinguished Service Cross, Distinguished Flying Cross and four more Air Medals.

After his Vietnam tour ended, Tolson was promoted to lieutenant general. He was given command of the XVIII Airborne Corps on August 1, 1968. Tolson was also presented the Master Army Aviator badge. He retired in 1973 as deputy commander of the Continental Army.

Tolson died on December 2, 1991, at the age of 76. He was survived by his wife, two sons and a daughter. Tolson was buried at Arlington National Cemetery on December 4, 1991.

His wife Margaret Jordan (Young) Tolson (July 5, 1922 – July 8, 2020) was interred beside him on September 17, 2020.
