= Operation Somerset Plain =

Part of the Vietnam War (1968)

- Part of the Vietnam War
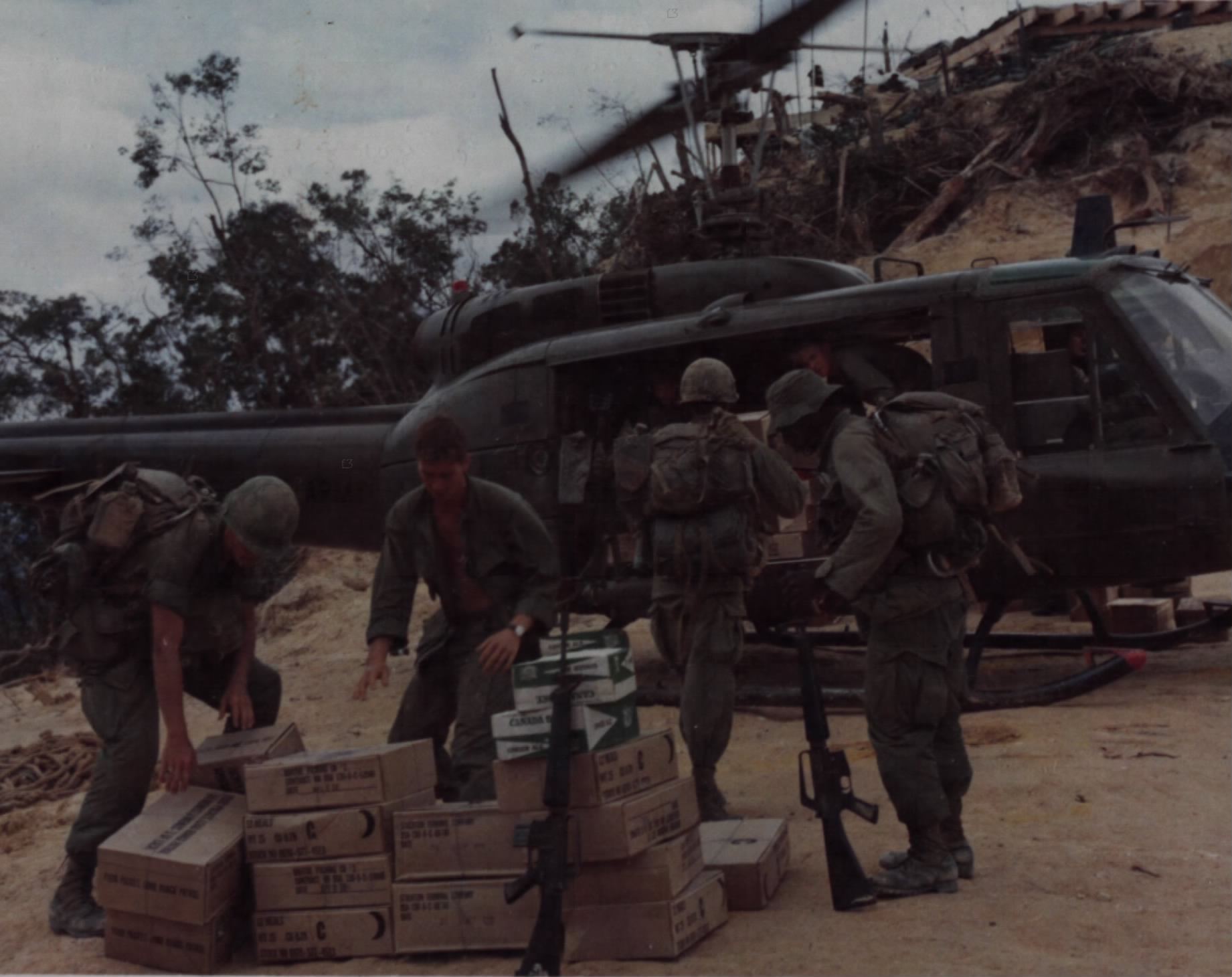
- UH-1D loaded with supplies at Firebase Berchtesgaden, 7 August 1968
Date	4–20 August 1968
Location	A Shau Valley, South Vietnam
Result	U.S./ARVN claim victory

Belligerents
United States; South Vietnam	North Vietnam

Commanders and leaders
LTG Richard G. Stilwell; MG Melvin Zais; COL Harold I. Hayward	

Units involved
(United States) 1st Brigade, 101st Airborne Division (South Vietnam) 1st Division	816th Main Force Battalion; 818th Main Force Battalion

Casualties and losses
(United States) 7 killed (South Vietnam) 11 killed	US/ARVN body count: 181 killed 4 captured

Operation Somerset Plain was a joint military operation conducted by the United States and the Army of the Republic of Vietnam (ARVN) in the A Sầu Valley from 4–20 August 1968.

== Background ==
The A Sầu Valley was a vital corridor for moving military supplies coming from the Ho Chi Minh Trail and was used by the People's Army of Vietnam (PAVN) as a staging area for numerous attacks in northern I Corps. Three months after the conclusion of Operation Delaware, MG Richard G. Stilwell, the U.S. Army deputy commander of III Marine Amphibious Force decided to mount another operation against the valley to disrupt the People's Army of Vietnam (PAVN) logistics network and forestall any attacks in I Corps.

== Operation ==
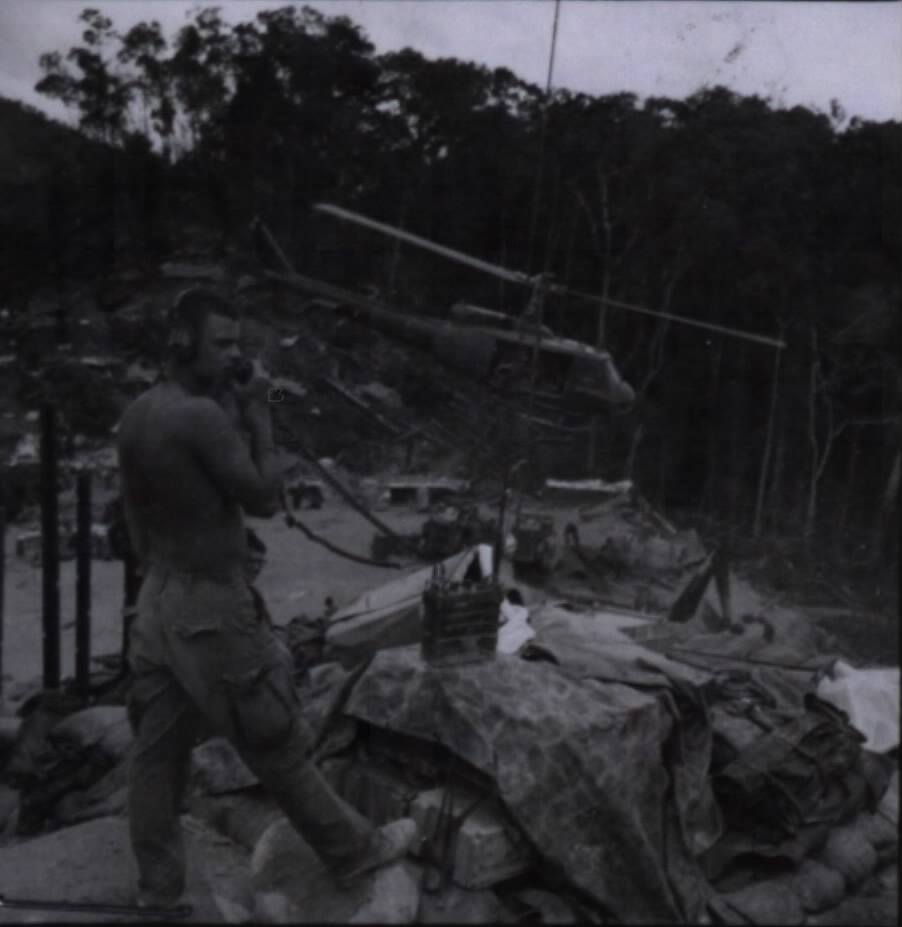
A Radio repairman from HQs 2nd Battalion, 502nd Infantry, 101st Airborne Division, tests an AN/PRC 77, 7 August 1968

The assault into the A Sầu Valley was preceded by an artillery bombardment from Firebase Berchtesgaden and Firebase Georgia and B-52 and tactical fighter-bomber strikes while tear gas was dropped at three routes into the valley from Laos.

On 4 August 1968 helicopters operating from Firebase Birmingham landed the first elements of the 1st Brigade, 101st Airborne Division in the valley near the abandoned A Lưới Camp. Resistance was light with only one helicopter gunship being forced down by PAVN fire. On 5 August elements of the ARVN 1st Division were landed in the southern part of the valley and on 6 August the elite ARVN Hac Bao (Black Panther) Reconnaissance Company arrived in the valley completing the deployment of forces.

The U.S./ARVN forces proceeded to search the valley meeting only scattered resistance until 10/11 August when the ARVN 3rd Battalion, 1st Infantry Regiment was attacked by elements of the PAVN 816th and 818th Main Force Battalions. Air and artillery support was called in and the PAVN retreated into the jungle losing several dozen killed.

Also on 10 August a misplaced air strike hit Company D, 2nd Battalion, 327th Infantry Regiment, killing seven and wounding fifty-four men.

On 16 August, two Long-range reconnaissance patrol teams and elements of Company C, 326th Engineer Battalion, laid delayed fuse mines and sensors (connected to Firebase Berchtesgaden) at the western passes into Laos to impede and monitor PAVN movement.

On 17 August the U.S./ARVN force began to be lifted out of the valley and this proceeded without PAVN interference, concluding on 20 August.

== Aftermath ==
U.S. losses were 7 killed, while ARVN losses were 11 killed, 8 of which were from a U.S. artillery round that fell short. US/ARVN forces claims the PAVN losses were 181 killed and 4 captured.

Only a modest amount of supplies were located and destroyed, which suggested that the PAVN had still not recovered from the effects of Operation Delaware.
