= Dong Re Lao Mountain =

Mountain in Vietnam

Dong Re Lao Mountain is located at 16.3038°N 107.2479°E in the A Shau Valley, Vietnam, near the Laotian border. It is densely forested and rises to 4,879 feet (1,487 m), just north of A Luoi, a former French airfield.

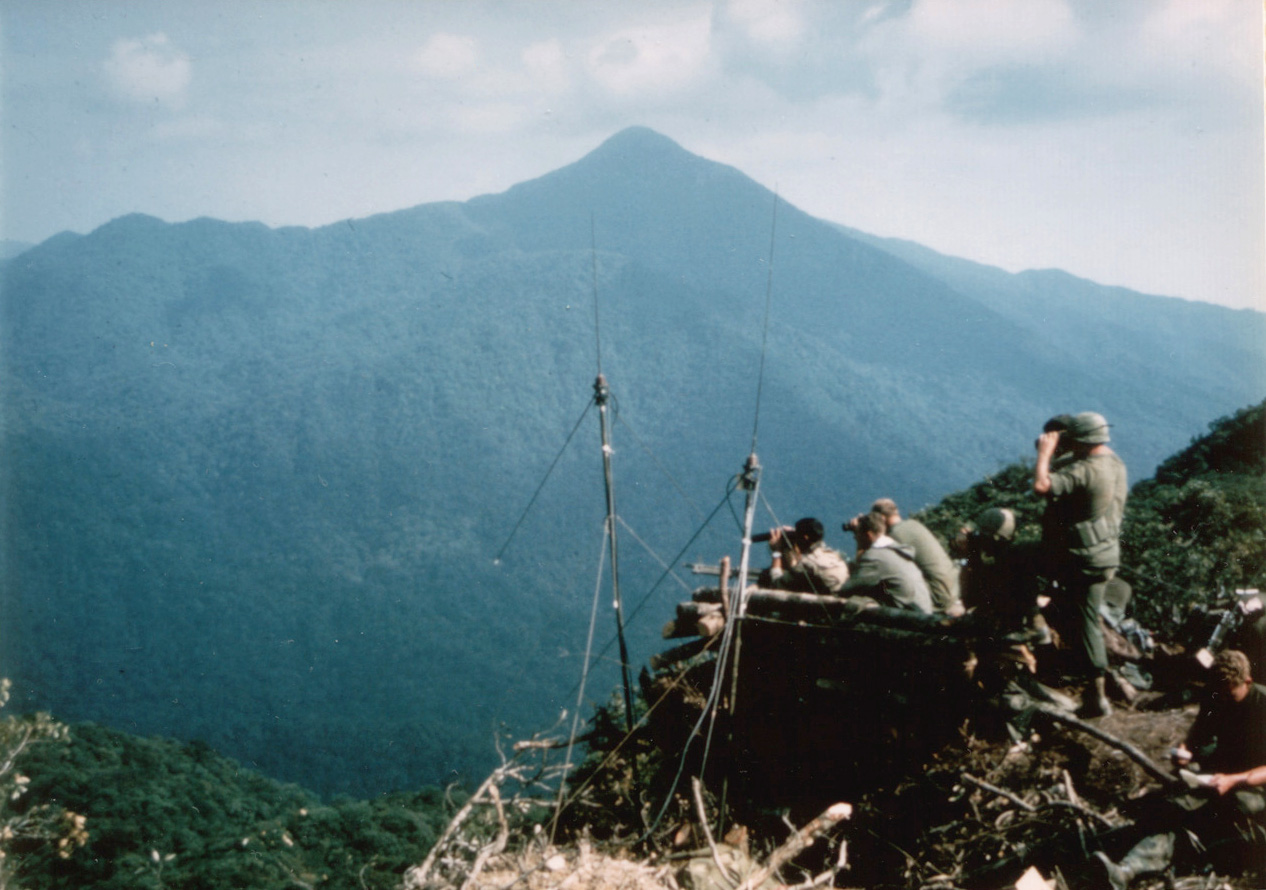
April 24, 1968. American Long Range Patrol soldiers on Dong Re Lao Mountain, which they dubbed Signal Hill, scanning for North Vietnamese vehicles in A Shau Valley below.

In April 1968, during the Vietnam War, the mountain was the site of an intense battle between members of the American 1st Cavalry Division, long-range reconnaissance patrol troops, and the North Vietnamese Army. The mountain was dubbed "Signal Hill" by headquarters as it served as the lone radio relay site for American forces fighting in the valley during Operation Delaware.

== See also ==
- Battle of A Shau
- Battle of Signal Hill Vietnam
- Company E, 52nd Infantry (LRP)
- Long Range Reconnaissance Patrol
- Operation Delaware
