= Battle of A Sau =

1966 battle during the Vietnam War

Battle of A Shau
- Part of the Vietnam War
Date	8-10 March 1966
Location	16.12°N 107.33°E; A Shau Valley, South Vietnam UTM Grid YC 499-837
Result	North Vietnamese victory

Belligerents
United States; South Vietnam	North Vietnam

Units involved
(United States) 5th Special Forces Group (South Vietnam) CIDG	325th Infantry Division: 95B Regiment

Strength
(United States) 17 Green Berets (South Vietnam) 410–417 CIDG Overall: 385–434 (camp garrison)	(Vietnam) 2,000

Casualties and losses
(United States) 5 missing (South Vietnam) 196–288 killed or missing	~800 killed

The Battle of A Shau (Vietnamese: trận A Sầu) was waged in early 1966 during the Vietnam War between the People's Army of Vietnam (PAVN) and the forces of the United States and South Vietnam. The battle began on 8 March and lasted until 10 March with the fall of the U.S. Army's Special Forces camp of the same name. The battle was a strategic victory for the PAVN in that they were able to take control of the A Shau Valley and use it as a base area for the rest of the war.

== Background ==
The A Shau Special Forces Camp was located in the A Sầu Valley, about 30 miles (48 km) southwest of Huế and 2 km east of the Laos border in Thừa Thiên Province. The valley was strategically important for the PAVN as a major infiltration route because it served as a bridge from the Ho Chi Minh Trail in Laos into populated coastal areas of Thừa Thiên Province. The camp had been established in 1963. Defending the camp were 10 Green Berets from the 5th Special Forces Group and 210 South Vietnamese Civilian Irregular Defense Group, supported by Air Commando units equipped with vintage A-1 Skyraiders and AC-47 Spooky gunships.

Deputy COMUSMACV General William Westmoreland inspected the camp in May 1964. As his CV-2 Caribou aircraft was departing the camp's airstrip, it was hit by PAVN fire wounding six of the 14 aboard, including the pilot and copilot, Westmoreland was uninjured.

Two South Vietnamese camps at A Lưới and Ta Bat in the A Shau valley had been abandoned on 8 December 1965. The special forces camp was routinely harassed by small Vietcong formations leading up to the battle. Throughout February and March, 1966, platoon-sized troops from the camp were sent out to conduct reconnaissance patrols in the surrounding area. On 5 March two PAVN defectors turned up at the camp. Under interrogation, they indicated that four battalions of the PAVN 325th Division were planning to attack the camp.

Based on that information, night patrols were dispatched to confirm the enemy positions but no sightings were made. However, Air Commandos conducting reconnaissance flights observed large build-ups of PAVN troops along with anti-aircraft emplacements. As a result, airstrikes were ordered against enemy positions.

On 7 March the A Shau camp was reinforced with seven U.S. Special Forces personnel, nine interpreters, and a MIKE Force Company in anticipation of the North Vietnamese attack.

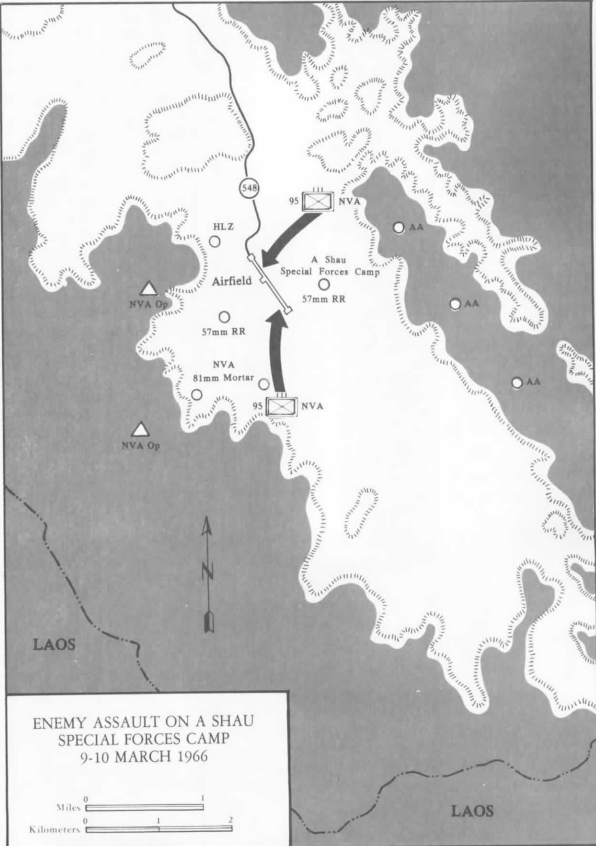
PAVN assault on A Shau Camp 1966

== Battle ==
On 8 March the camp was placed on general alert and the camp's defenders had taken up their positions. A PAVN assault was launched during the night, but it was beaten back. Because of poor weather conditions that would hinder tactical air and resupply efforts, the PAVN decided to continue despite their heavy casualties. The second attack began during the early morning hours of 9 March with mortar bombardment, damaging communications and reducing many defensive positions to rubble. At 13:00 an AC-47D "Spooky 70" from the 4th Air Commando Squadron, circling the camp, fired on the attacking PAVN formations. However, the slow moving aircraft was shot down and crashed about five kilometers north of the camp. All six crewmen survived, but they were promptly attacked by the PAVN. Three crewmen were killed, though the others were eventually rescued by a USAF HH-43.

Between 16:30 and 17:00, supplies of ammunition were flown in by C-123 and CV-2 aircraft, but the resupply drops often landed outside of the camp perimeter and could not be retrieved. At the same time, helicopters were called to evacuate the wounded. However, reinforcements from Huế and Phu Bai could not be deployed because of the bad weather, leaving the camp's defenders to repair their defensive wall and dig in for the night.

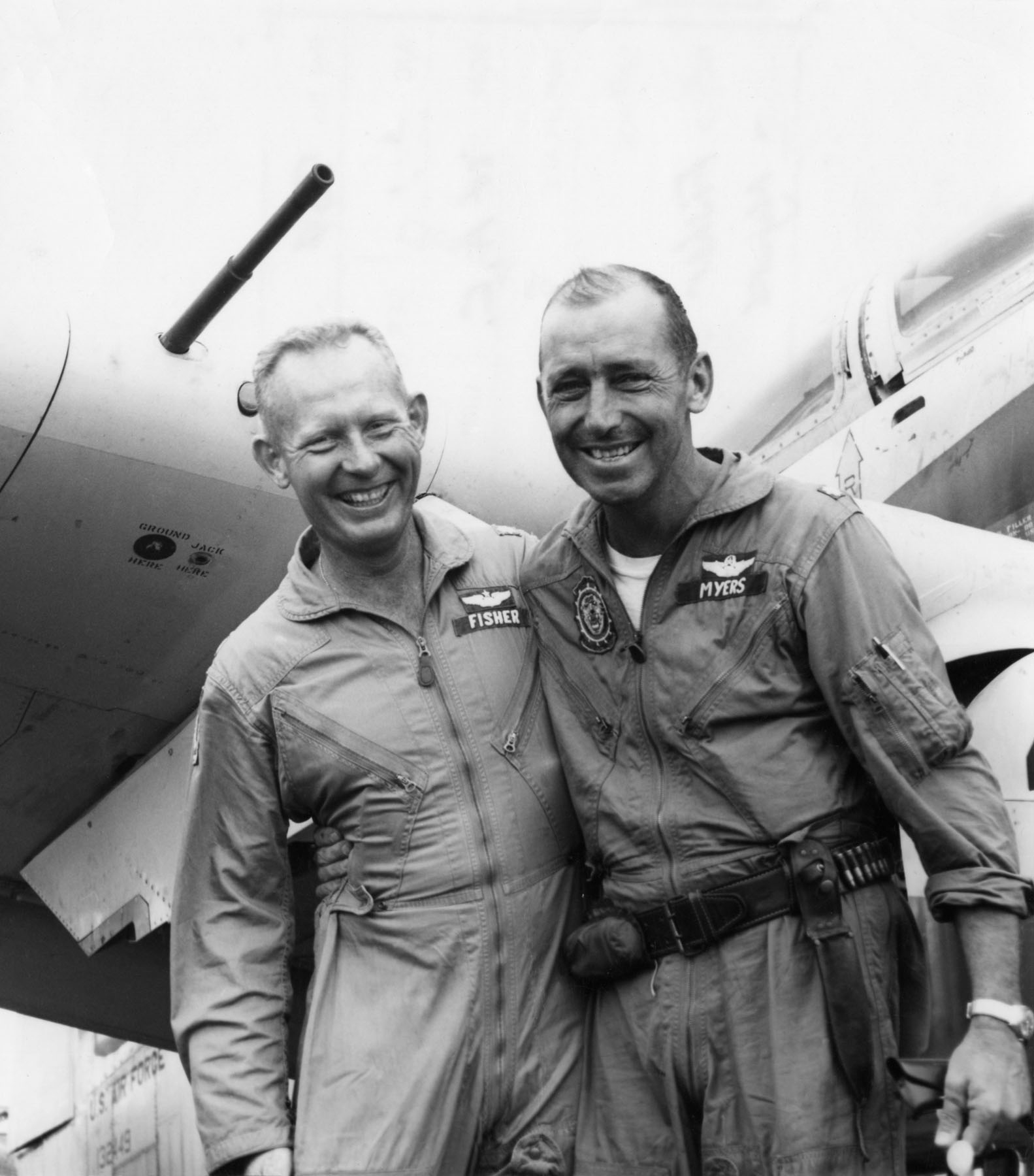
U.S. Air Force Majors Bernard F. Fisher and D.W. Myers, 10 March 1966

On the morning of 10 March, the PAVN launched another attack with mortar and recoilless rifle fire. At 05:00 a PAVN assault team penetrated the eastern perimeter, where hand-to-hand combat took place for three hours. By 08:00 the greatly outnumbered defenders had withdrawn to the camp's north wall. Throughout the day USMC and Republic of Vietnam Air Force bombers hit PAVN positions around the camp. During the day an A-1 piloted by Major D.W. Myers was hit and forced to crash-land on the A Shau airstrip 200m from PAVN positions. Major Bernard F. Fisher landed his A-1 on the airstrip rescuing Myers. For this action Fisher was later awarded the Medal of Honor.

As fighting continued the situation deteriorated as ammunition began running short and the decision was made to evacuate all personnel. At 17:00 all communication equipment was destroyed. The survivors carried out their evacuation orders and destroyed all abandoned weapons and withdrew further to the north wall. Leading the evacuation effort were fifteen H-34 helicopters from HMM-163 supported by four UH-1B gunships of VMO-2. Panic-stricken South Vietnamese soldiers and civilians mobbed the evacuation helicopters and overwhelmed U.S. Special Forces troops as they abandoned the camp. This reached a point where the helicopters were so overloaded some Special Forces soldiers were forced to fire upon their allies to allow the helicopters to take off. Only 172 of 368 Nung and Vietnamese irregulars were flown out. The others were listed as MIA, although many would turn up later, having escaped on their own. The evacuation was further complicated by heavy enemy anti-aircraft fire, and two H-34s were lost.

== Aftermath ==
Organized resistance ceased around 17:45 when PAVN troops overran the camp. During the battle the U.S. Special Forces team suffered five killed and 12 wounded (100% casualties). Only 186 of the garrison of 434 were evacuated, with the others listed as missing, although some of them surfaced later. Another report stated 231 out of 417 irregulars were lost. According to Sgt. Major Bennie G. Adkins only 122 out of about 410 irregulars survived, with many of them wounded. Adkins was awarded the Medal of Honor for his actions in defense of the camp by President Barack Obama in September 2014.

In May a Special Forces team entered the abandoned camp to recover the bodies of those killed in the battle. They found the bodies undisturbed and large quantities of ammunition remaining in the camp. On 1 June III Marine Amphibious Force (III MAF) commander Lieutenant general Lew Walt ordered the 3rd Marine Division commander Major general Wood B. Kyle to develop a plan to return to the camp and destroy the ammunition. On the morning of 23 June the Marines launched Operation Turner with Company I, 3rd Battalion, 4th Marines being landed at the camp by CH-46s of HMM-164 with air support by VMO-2 UH-1E gunships. The Marines completed the destruction of the ammunition and pulled out after two hours on the ground.

The PAVN transformed the A Shau Valley into a heavily fortified base area with bunkers, antiaircraft guns, and artillery. US and South Vietnamese forces were unable to re-establish a permanent presence in the valley for the remainder of the war. During the Tet Offensive, the A Shau Valley provided PAVN/VC troops an important sanctuary from which to launch attacks at South Vietnamese cities and military bases, especially Huế and Phu Bai. Raids were launched into the valley in April 1968 (Operation Delaware), August 1968 (Operation Somerset Plain), March 1969 (Operation Dewey Canyon) and May 1969 (Operation Apache Snow).

== Sources ==
- An Encyclopedia of Battles: Accounts of Over 1560 Battles from 1479 B.C. to the Present By David Eggenberger - Page 31
- "The Fall of a Fortress". Time. 18 March 1966. Archived from the original on 4 July 2010.
- Perini, Michael B. (April 1983). "Valor: Uncommon Gallantry" (PDF). Air & Space Forces Magazine. Vol. 66, no. 4. Archived (PDF) from the original on 24 January 2026.
- Sams, Kenneth (18 April 1966). "The Fall Of A Shau" (PDF). Project Checo report. USAF. Archived from the original (PDF) on 28 November 2007.
