= Operation Delaware =

1968 military operation in the Vietnam war

- Part of the Vietnam War
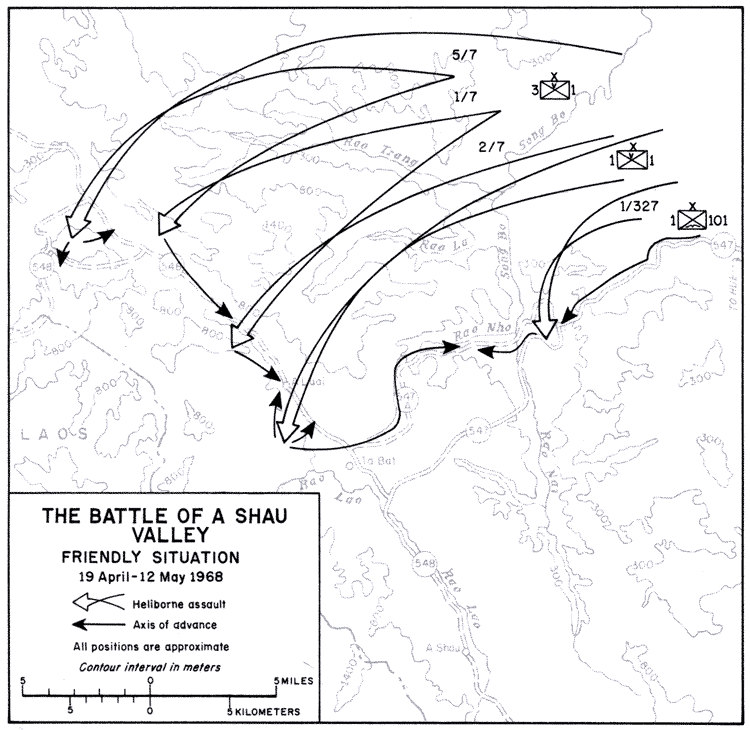
Date	19 April – 17 May 1968
Location	A Shau Valley, Republic of Vietnam
Result	US victory

Belligerents
United States; South Vietnam	North Vietnam

Commanders and leaders
John J. Tolson	

Units involved
(United States) 1st Cavalry Division; 1st Brigade, 101st Airborne Division (South Vietnam) Republic of Vietnam Airborne Division	

Casualties and losses
(United States) 142 killed (South Vietnam) 26 killed PAVN claim:1,000 casualties	US body count: 869 killed 1 light tank captured 70 trucks captured 2 bulldozers captured

Operation Delaware/Operation Lam Son 216 was a joint military operation launched during the Vietnam War. It began on 19 April 1968, with troops from the United States and the Army of the Republic of Vietnam (ARVN) moving into the A Sầu Valley. The A Sầu Valley was a vital corridor for moving military supplies coming from the Ho Chi Minh Trail and was used by the People's Army of Vietnam (PAVN) as a staging area for numerous attacks in northern I Corps. Other than small, special operations reconnaissance patrols, American and South Vietnamese forces had not been present in the region since the Battle of A Shau in March 1966, when a U.S. Special Forces camp located there was overrun.

== Background ==
In January 1968, Military Assistance Command, Vietnam (MACV), ordered the 1st Cavalry Division (Airmobile) to move north from the Central Highlands to support the III Marine Amphibious Force in I Corps. The 1st Cavalry Division, an airmobile division with 20,000 men and nearly 450 helicopters, had the most firepower and mobility of any division-size unit in Vietnam. When it arrived in I Corps, the 1st Cavalry Division fought in the Battle of Quang Tri and the Battle of Huế in the Tet Offensive. It was fully engaged in Operation Pegasus, the relief of Khe Sanh when its commander, Maj. Gen. John J. Tolson, was ordered to prepare plans for Operation Delaware.

After gaining control of the A Sầu Valley in March 1966 the PAVN fortified it with powerful crew-served 37mm antiaircraft cannons, some of them radar controlled. They also had rapid firing twin-barreled 23mm cannons and many 12.7mm heavy machine guns to contribute to their air defenses. The A Sầu Valley soon evolved into a major logistics depot for the PAVN, with storage locations often located in underground bunkers and tunnels. Because of this strength on the ground, and the relative geographic isolation of the valley, the U.S. and its allies conducted little offensive activity in the area except for air attacks, and those were limited by steep, mountainous terrain often cloaked under clouds and prone to sudden, violent changes in weather. Because of the very limited air mobility of the Marines in I Corps, no ground operations of any significance had been launched in the A Sầu.

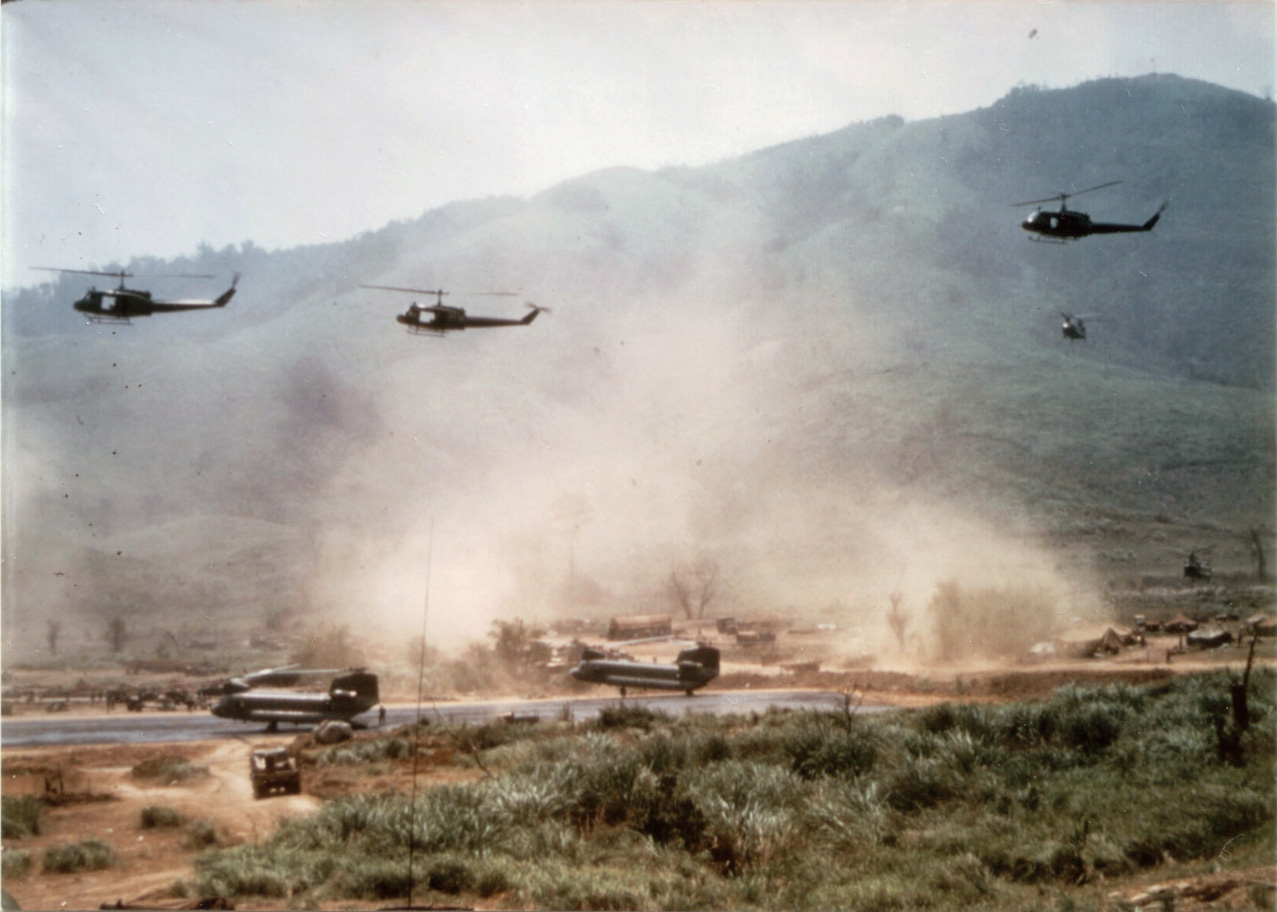
1st Cav forces at LZ Stud approaching Khe Sanh Combat Base

By early April 1968, the PAVN had just suffered casualties of more than 40,000 men in two major military campaigns: the Tet Offensive and at Khe Sanh. But the PAVN still had the ability to take the initiative in the northernmost part of I Corps. That ability came in part from isolated base areas like the sparsely populated A Sầu Valley, running north–south along the Laotian border 30 miles (48 km) south of Khe Sanh, where troops and supplies were moved into South Vietnam as the PAVN prepared for another battle — at a time and place of its choosing. The A Sầu, a mile-wide bottomland flanked by densely forested 5,000-foot (1,500 m) mountains, was bisected lengthwise by Route 548, a hard-crusted dirt road.

COMUSMACV General William Westmoreland believed that heavy press coverage of Operation Pegasus had given the PAVN considerable information about U.S. dispositions and movements and so he decided to embargo news of the operation for as long as possible. Besides maintaining a margin of security for his troops, the embargo would cover the insertion of a reconnaissance force of up to battalion size into Laos at a point above where the valley entered South Vietnam. Westmoreland informed the Saigon correspondents on 26 April that he was imposing an extended embargo on Delaware. Following reports by syndicated columnist Joseph Alsop filing in Hong Kong and South Vietnamese information officers announcing that their units were involved in the operation, MACV lifted the press embargo after 8 days.

== Operation ==
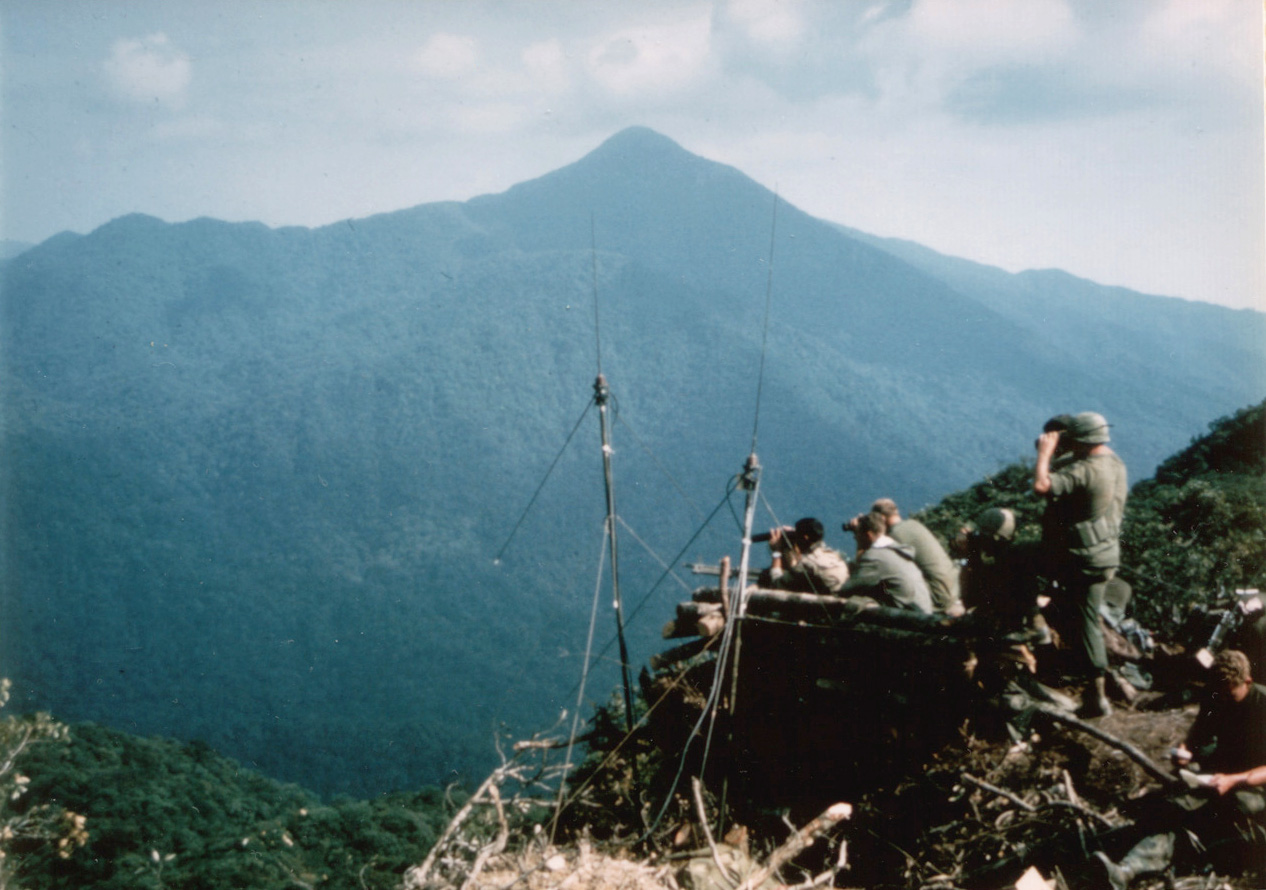
LRRPs on Signal Hill scanning for enemy vehicles in the A Sầu Valley below.

The battle began on 19 April 1968, after preparatory B-52 and tactical bombing of PAVN antiaircraft and troop positions. Troops of the 3rd Brigade, 1st Cavalry Division were inserted into Landing Zones Tiger (16.352°N 107.109°E) and Vicki (16.373°N 107.136°E) at the north of A Sầu Valley, as the 1st Brigade, 101st Airborne Division moved west from Firebase Bastogne along Route 547, the 1st Battalion, 327th Infantry Regiment moved southwest meeting up with the 2nd Battalion, 327th Infantry which had been landed by helicopter at the junction of Route 547 and Route 547A, establishing Firebase Veghel. The operation required a radio relay site so the engaged brigades could communicate with Camp Evans near the coast or with approaching aircraft. On the eastern side, midway up the valley, was a perfect spot: the 4,878-foot (1,487 m) Dong Re Lao Mountain. The 1st Cavalry Division's headquarters dubbed it "Signal Hill." A 30-man long-range reconnaissance patrol (LRRP, or "Lurp") from Company E, 52nd Infantry (LRP) rappelled by helicopter onto Signal Hill, followed by other members of Company E along with signalmen, who fought a two-day battle with PAVN forces. Poor weather and anti-aircraft fire made flying very dangerous. The 1st Cavalry lost 10 helicopters destroyed and 23 damaged in the first day's assault.

On 20 April the 3rd Brigade, 1st Cavalry continued to deploy, the 1st Battalion, 7th Cavalry Regiment moved southeast while the 5th Battalion, 7th Cavalry moved to block Route 548 to Laos. The 2nd Battalion 7th Cavalry was landed further down the valley. The 6th ARVN Airborne Battalion was landed by helicopter at the 1/327th's landing zone and soon was engaged by PAVN forces.

On 21 April the Cavalry units continued to push further down the valley, while the 2nd Battalion, 502nd Infantry Regiment was landed near Firebase Veghel to support the 1/327th and 6th ARVN Airborne.

On 24 April 2nd Battalion, 8th Cavalry was landed 2 km south of the abandoned A Lưới Airfield. The Cavalry forces found a communications network and numerous supply caches in the area including 3 37mm anti-aircraft guns.

On 25 April First Lieutenant James M. Sprayberry leading a patrol from Company D, 5th Battalion, 7th Cavalry rescued men who had been wounded and cut off from the rest of the company. Sprayberry personally killed 12 PAVN soldiers and eliminated 2 machine gun emplacements, he was subsequently promoted to captain and awarded the Medal of Honor for his actions.

On 26 April C-130B #60-0298 was hit by antiaircraft fire while on approach to drop supplies at A Lưới Airfield, the aircraft crashed and burnt on the airfield, the remains of 5 of the 8 crewmen were recovered.

East of the valley, the 1st Brigade, 101st Airborne and the ARVN 3rd Airborne Task Force continued clearing the territory between Firebases Bastogne and Veghel. For the most part they encountered small supply parties that quickly broke contact. On the 29th, however, Companies B and D, 1/327th Infantry, got into a prolonged firefight with a PAVN company only a kilometer or so from Veghel. The PAVN had the upper hand because they fought from well-made bunkers and camouflaged positions in the trees and at one point sent out a force to envelop Company B. The U.S. unit pulled itself out of the trap, although not before losing 13 killed and 16 wounded. When the two U.S. companies renewed their attack the following morning, they found the bunkers empty except for the bodies of 15 dead PAVN.

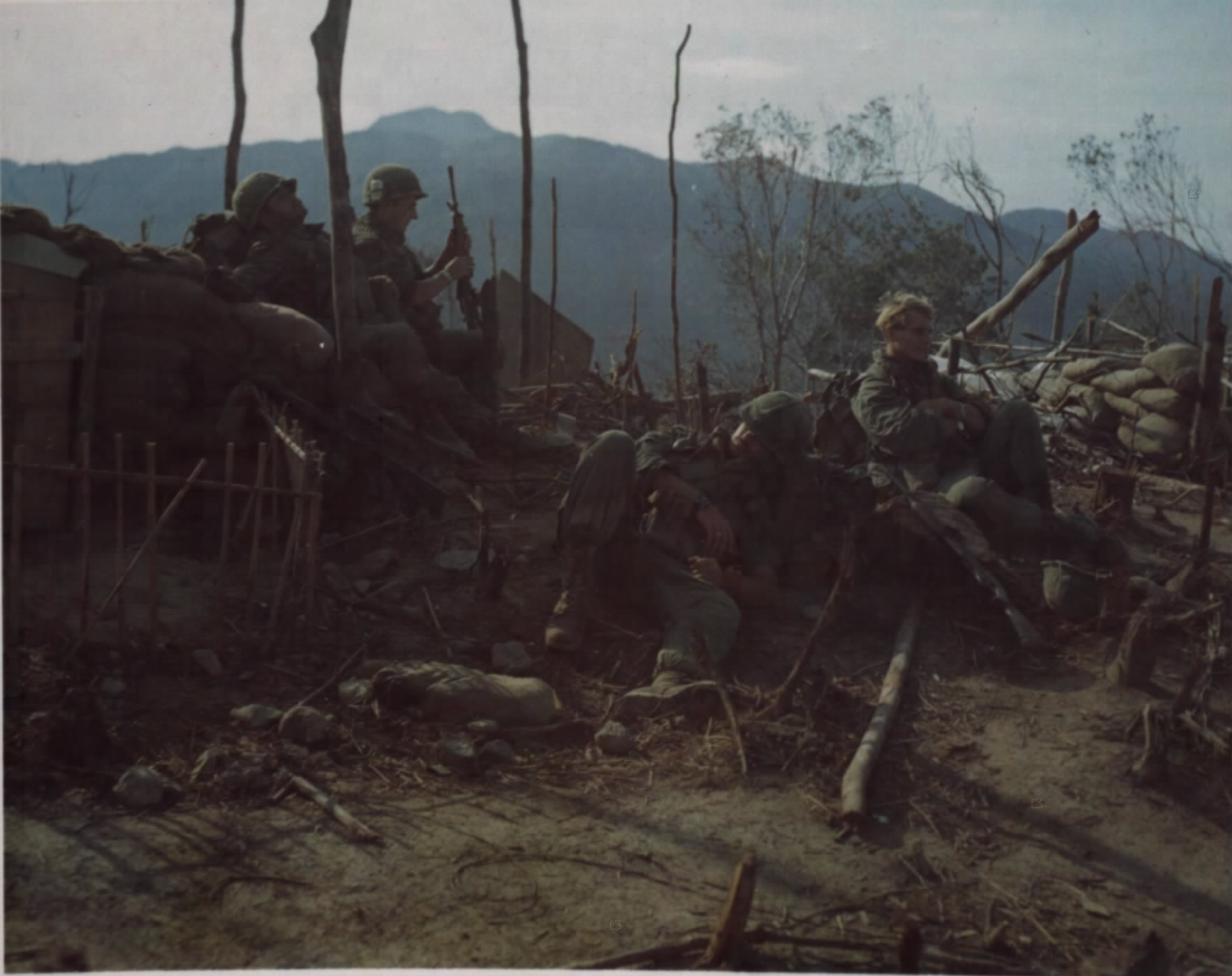
Members of the 2nd Battalion, 7th Cavalry rest after breaking down the equipment on Landing Zone Pepper while waiting transportation back to Camp Evans, 11 May 1968

The first cargo aircraft, a C-7 Caribou, landed at A Lưới on 2 May. After further improvements to the airstrip, the first C-130 Hercules landed on 4 May. As the 1st Cavalry Division kept sweeping south through the valley it linked with the other allied units that served as blocking forces and uncovered large caches of weapons, vehicles, ammunition, and rice.

US and ARVN troop extraction started on 10 May. On 12 May 1/12 Cavalry linked up with the ARVN Airborne moving along Route 547. The operation terminated on 17 May.

== Aftermath ==
U.S. losses were 142 killed and ARVN losses were 26 killed. Eleven helicopters were destroyed and 35 damaged. Bad weather aggravated the loss by causing delays in troop movements, allowing a substantial number of PAVN to escape to safety in Laos. Nevertheless, Operation Delaware was hailed as a success by the United States, but the withdrawal of US and ARVN troops made it possible for PAVN forces to quickly regain control of the valley.

Tolson, in summing up the weather's impact on his division's airmobile operations, said, "According to the long range forecast based on old French records, April was supposed to have been the best month for weather in the A Shau Valley. As it turned out, May would have been a far better month––but you don't win them all." U.S. forces would return to the A Sầu Valley in August 1968 in Operation Somerset Plain, in January 1969 in Operation Dewey Canyon and in May 1969 during Operation Apache Snow.

During the operation U.S./ARVN forces captured large supply caches, 70 trucks, 2 bulldozers and one damaged PT-76 light tank.

The official PAVN history claims that they inflicted over 1,000 casualties of U.S/ARVN forces during the operation.

== See also ==
- Battle of A Shau
- Battle of Khe Sanh
- Battle of Signal Hill Vietnam
