= A Sầu Valley =

Valley in Vietnam

Coordinates: 16°15′33″N 107°12′45″E

An undated photo of a Bell UH-1 "Huey" helicopter landing with soldiers of the 101st Airborne Delta Raiders in the A Shau valley near Hue, Vietnam.

Huế

The A Shau Valley (Vietnamese: thung lũng A Sầu) is a valley in Vietnam's Huế province, along the border of Laos. The valley runs north and south for 40 kilometers and is a 1.5-kilometer-wide flat bottomland covered with tall elephant grass, flanked by two densely forested mountain ridges whose summits vary in elevation from 900 to 1,800 meters. A Shau Valley was one of the key entry points into South Vietnam for men and material brought along the Ho Chi Minh trail by the North Vietnamese Army and was the scene of heavy fighting during the Vietnam War. The A Shau Valley is bisected lengthwise by Route 548. The Ho Chi Minh Highway now runs along the valley floor.

== See also ==
- Battle of A Shau
- Battle of Fire Support Base Ripcord
- Battle of Hamburger Hill
- Battle of Signal Hill Vietnam
- Dong Ap Bia
- Dong Re Lao Mountain
- Operation Apache Snow
- Operation Delaware
- Operation Dewey Canyon
- Operation Somerset Plain
