= Long-range reconnaissance patrol =

Military unit that patrols in enemy-held territory

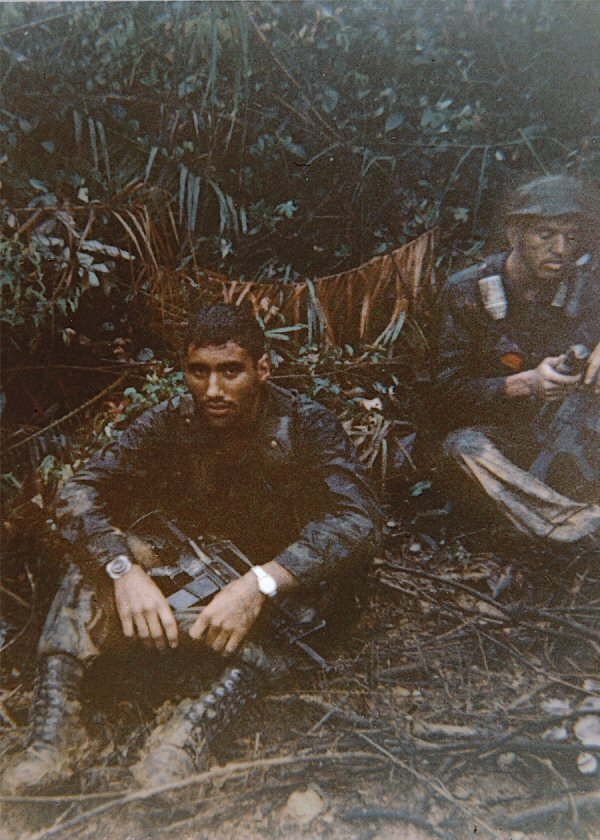
U.S. Army Rangers LRRP team leader and radiotelephone operator, Vietnam War, 1968

A long-range reconnaissance patrol, or LRRP, is a small, well-armed reconnaissance team that patrols deep into enemy-held territory.

The concept of scouts dates back to the origins of warfare itself. However, in modern times these specialized units evolved from examples such as Rogers' Rangers in colonial British America, the Lovat Scouts in World War One, the Long Range Desert Group and the Special Air Service in the Western Desert Campaign and North West Europe, similar units such as Force 136 in East Asia, and the special Finnish light infantry units during the Second World War.

Postwar, the role was carried in various North Atlantic Treaty Organization (NATO) and British Commonwealth countries by units that could trace their origins to these wartime creations such as the British SAS, Australia's Special Air Service Regiment and the New Zealand Special Air Service, 1er RPIMa, 13e RDP, GCP, Groupement de Commandos Mixtes Aéroportés in France and the United States Army Rangers, Long Range Surveillance teams, and the dismounted reconnaissance troops of RSTA squadrons.

== History ==
As indicated, the use of scouts is ancient, however, during the French and Indian War (1754–1763), the techniques of long-range reconnaissance and raiding were significantly implemented by the British in colonial North America. The British employed Major Robert Rogers to make long-range attacks against the French and their Indian allies along the frontiers of the British colonies and New France. The achievements of Major Roberts's dozen companies of approximately 1,200 men during the French and Indian War were so extraordinary that his doctrine, "Standing Orders, Rogers' Rangers," 1759, became the cornerstone of future U.S. Army long-range reconnaissance patrol units.

== Long-range reconnaissance patrol by nation ==
=== Australia ===
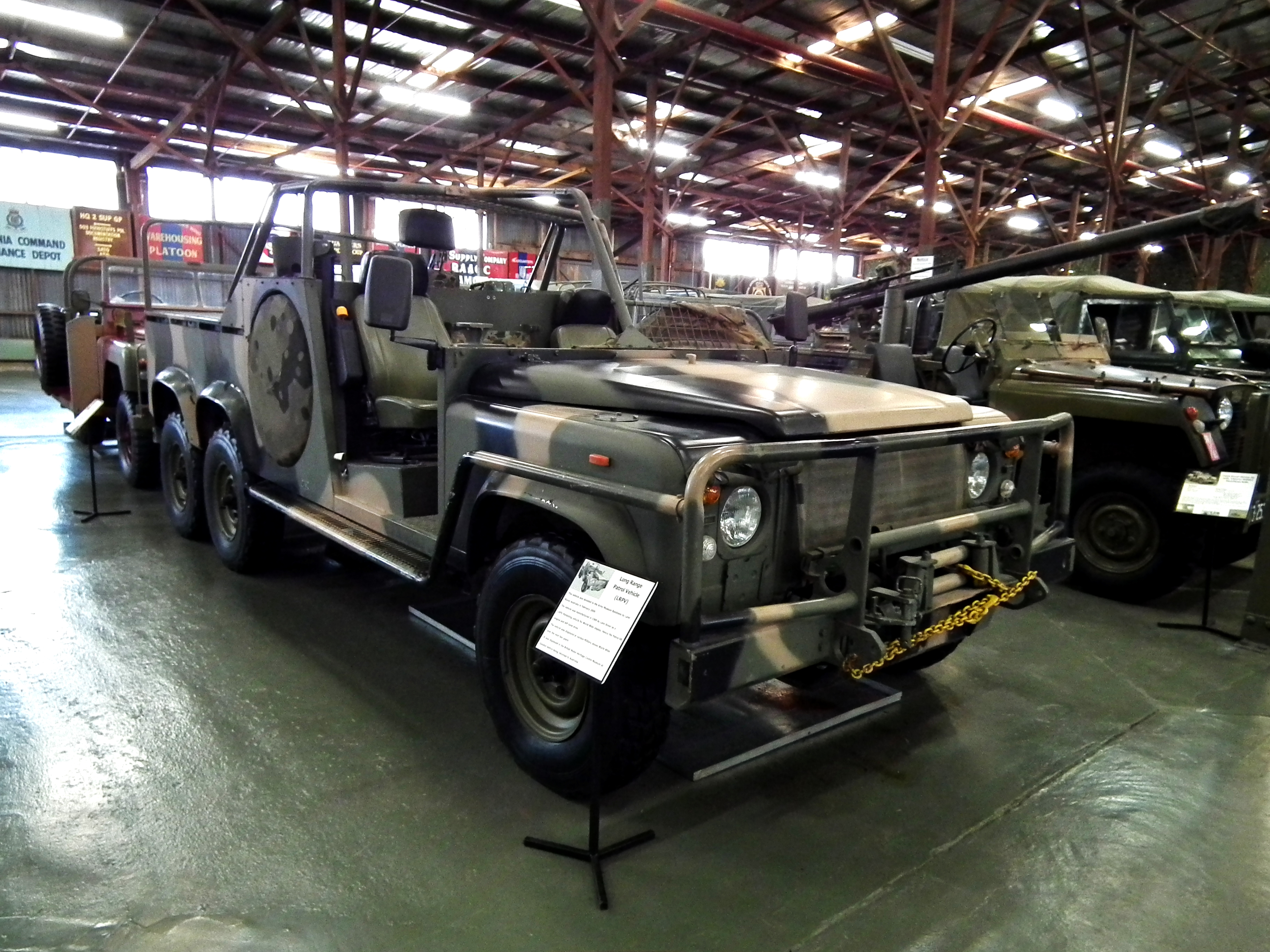
An Australian Army Long Range Patrol Vehicle used by the Special Air Service Regiment.

During the Second World War, the 2/1st North Australia Observer Unit was tasked with patrolling the remote areas of northern Australia on horseback. Many from the Unit were recruited to join M Special Unit and Z Special Unit for long-range specialist reconnaissance and sabotage behind Japanese lines.

From 1966 until 1971 troopers from the Australian Special Air Service Regiment (SASR) served in Vietnam as part of the 1st Australian Task Force at Nui Dat, Phuoc Tuy Province. Missions included medium range reconnaissance patrols, observation of enemy troop movements, and long range offensive operations and ambushing in enemy dominated territory in support of 1ATF operations throughout Phuoc Tuy Province as well as Bien Hoa, Long Khanh and Binh Tuy provinces.

In the 1980s the Regional Force Surveillance Units (NORFORCE, The Pilbara Regiment and 51st Battalion, Far North Queensland Regiment) were formed to conduct long-range reconnaissance and surveillance patrols in the sparsely populated and remote regions of northern Australia.

=== Canada ===
The Canadian Rangers conduct long-range surveillance or sovereignty patrols in the sparsely settled areas of Northern Canada. Although part of the Canadian Army, they are an irregular military force. Patrol Pathfinders units form part of the Reconnaissance Platoon of the 3rd (Light Infantry) Battalion of each Regular Force infantry Regiment. Patrol Pathfinders are trained in airborne and amphibious insertion, including by submarine, and conduct deep reconnaissance missions

=== Denmark ===
The Danish Defence Forces had three Long-Range Surveillance companies (LRSC) known as "Patrol-Companies" (PTLCOY): two assigned to the two Land Commands: LANDJUT and LANDZEALAND (Corps-level) (abbreviated "SEP/ELK" and "SEP/VLK" for: "Specielle Efterretningspatruljer/Østre resp. Vestre Landskommando" i.e. Special Intelligence Patrols) – two all-volunteer units within the Danish Home Guard - that was changed into the Special Support and Reconnaissance Company (SSR) in 2007 as a Special Reconnaissance (SR) Company dedicated to supporting the Danish Special Operations. The third and last company (PTLCOY/DDIV) was assigned to the Jutland Division (later Danish Division/DDIV) and was trained by instructors from the Danish Army Special Operations Forces: Jægerkorpset (i.e. Hunter Force) in Aalborg. PTLCOY/DDIV was disbanded in 2002 due to budget-cuts and the intent to implement UAV in the Danish Army as the primary means of ISR. The first UAV project later failed and was disbanded too.

In addition to these units, the 3rd Reconnaissance Battalion, Guard Hussar Regiment, also has Long range reconnaissance capabilities, particularly in 1st and 2nd Light Reconnaissance Squadrons (1.LOPESK & 2.LOPESK), whose primary role is long range reconnaissance and sabotage in light vehicles and with minimal support and resupply.

Likely to be the world's smallest LRS unit is the Sirius Dog Sled Patrol (Danish: Slædepatruljen Sirius), known informally as Siriuspatruljen (the Sirius Patrol). It is a small squad-sized elite unit in the Danish Navy, that enforces Danish sovereignty in the Arctic wilderness of northern and eastern Greenland, and conducts long-range reconnaissance patrolling. Patrolling is usually done in pairs, sometimes for four months and often without additional human contact.

=== Finland ===
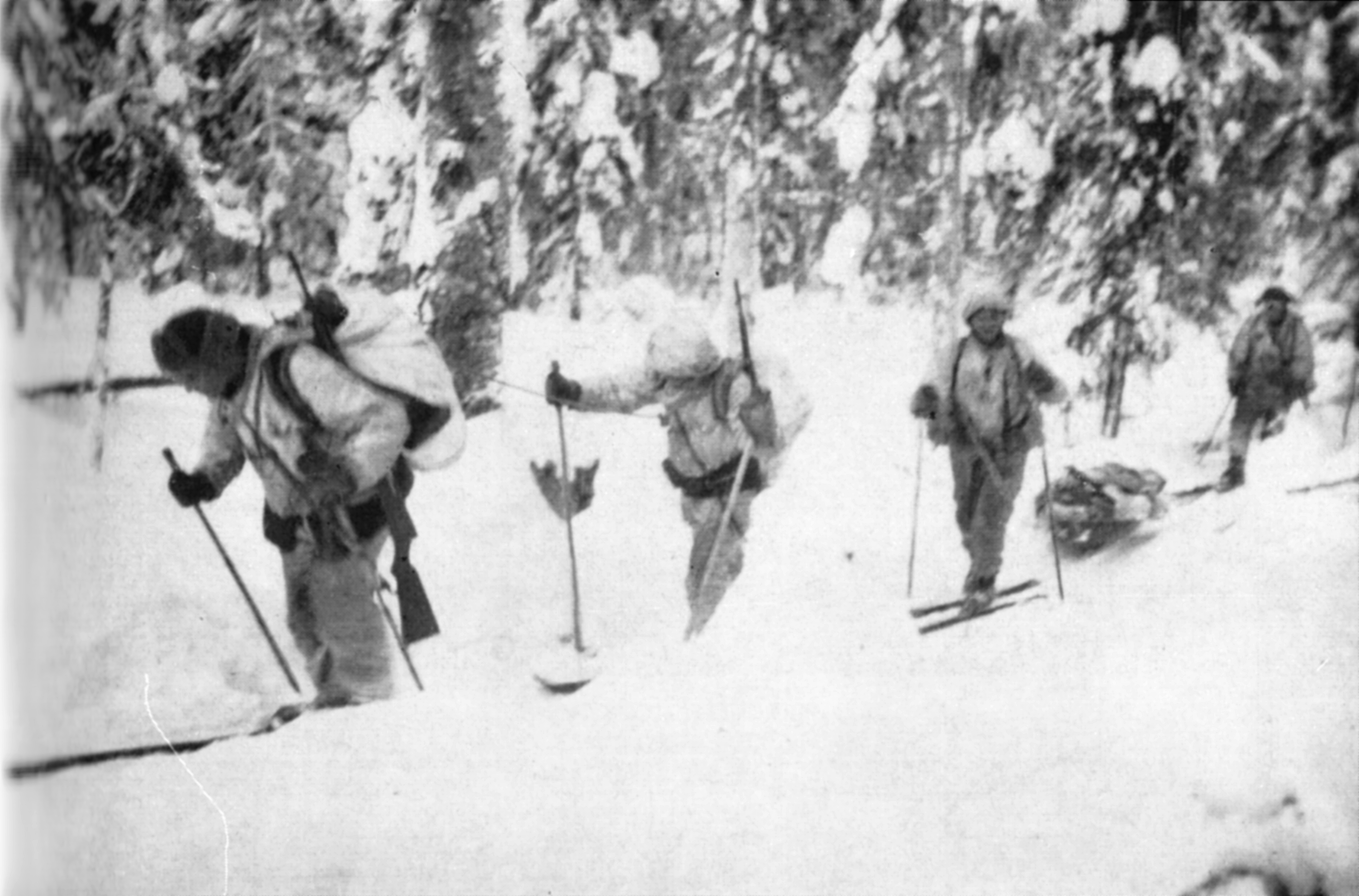
A Finnish long-range ski patrol pulling an ahkio.

In Finland, long-range patrols (kaukopartio) were especially notable during World War II. For example, Erillinen Pataljoona 4 (4th Detached Battalion), a command of four different long-range patrol detachments; Detachment Paatsalo, Detachment Kuismanen, Detachment Vehniäinen and Detachment Marttina, operated in the Finnish-Soviet theater of WWII, also known as the Continuation War, from 1941 through 1944. These units penetrated Soviet lines and conducted reconnaissance and destroy missions. During the trench warfare period of the war, long-range patrols were often conducted by special Finnish Sissi troops. After the war, NATO hired former members of the 4th Detached Battalion to spy on Soviet Union's military bases in the Kola Peninsula and Karelian Isthmus. NATO ended the spy operation in 1957. From then on, espionage data was obtained from forward satellites.

Former President of Finland, Mauno Koivisto, served in Lauri Törni's specially designed Jäger Company (called Detachment Törni) in the Finnish 1st Infantry Division. Lauri Törni became a US citizen and entered the US Army Special Forces. He gave important knowledge in long-range patrolling techniques and was declared MIA during the Vietnam War in 1965. His remains were later found, brought to the US, and buried in Arlington on 26 June 2003.

=== France ===
The French Army has 2 units specialized in reconnaissance: the 13th Parachute Dragoon Regiment and 2nd Hussar Regiment.

Other French units can perform long-range reconnaissance but are not specialized in it are the 1er RPIMa, Commandos Marine, GCP and GCM, and dedicated companies in cavalry regiments.

=== Germany ===
In the German Bundeswehr, LRRP is called Fernspäher (long-range scouts). Historically, the German Fernspäher units were modelled after the Finnish long-range patrols and derived from the existing elite units of Gebirgsjäger (mountain troops) and Fallschirmjäger (airborne troops). Originally, there were three companies of Fernspäher in the Bundeswehr, one being assigned to each corps. Since the reformation of German Special Forces in 1996, the Fernspählehrkompanie 200 (FSLK200) is the single remaining Fernspäher unit. The Fernspähers are part of the Special Operations Division. FSLK200 is the only German special force-type unit which has also recruited women. Details about operations of the FSLK200 are secret but it is known that Fernspäher carried out missions in Bosnia and Herzegovina, during the Kosovo War and later during Operation Enduring Freedom in Afghanistan.

=== India ===
Special Frontier Force is considered a long-range reconnaissance patrol or pathfinder. They were trained against the Chinese but used to great success in Pakistan administered Kashmir and in the northern state of Punjab.

=== Indonesia ===
Kopassus and Tontaipur of the Indonesian Army are units able to conduct long-range reconnaissance patrolling including pathfinder and Special reconnaissance operations.

=== Italy ===
Historically, airborne units are normally tasked with carrying, apart from the ordinary airborne assaults, deep infiltration small unit reconnaissance. After World War 2, during the Cold War, the main LRRP unit was the "Col Moschin" Parachute Assault Company (later battalion and then regiment). Another LRRP unit specialising as artillery observers were the 13th Target Acquisition Group "Aquileia", where "Group" is a definition of the Italian artillery indicating three batteries of guns, roughly a battalion sized unit) of the 3rd Missile Brigade "Aquileia", and especially the Batteria Acquisizione Obiettivi "Pipistrelli" (Target Acquisition Battery "Bats"), a company-sized fully airborne LRRP unit composed of artillery soldiers that trained at the I-LRRP school of Weingarten. This group later was incorporated in the Paratroopers Brigade "Folgore", becoming the 185th Paratroopers Reconnaissance Target Acquisition Regiment "Folgore".

=== Kenya ===
The Kenya Defence Forces has one LRS unit based in Nairobi. This unit shares LRP missions with the Special Forces Group.

=== Netherlands ===
The Korps Commandotroepen and NLMARSOF are LRRP capable. During the Cold War, the Korps Commandotroepen were known as Waarneming en Verkenning Compagnie (observation and reconnaissance company) and specialized in staying behind enemy lines. NLMARSOF's C-Squadron consists of two special recon units: Mountain Leaders and Special Forces Underwater Operators. From 1995 until 2010 the 11th Airmobile Brigade Air Assault had 3 platoons of long range scouts (RECCE). Main objective battlefield intelligence and direct actions. Trained in stay behind operations working in small units. These highly flexible units operated completely on its own in cross FLOT operations.

=== New Zealand ===
The New Zealand Special Air Service (NZSAS) is New Zealand's Special forces branch. NZSAS served with the Australian SAS Squadron during the Vietnam War and carried out Long-range reconnaissance patrols and ambushing of enemy supply routes, mounting 155 patrols over three tours.

=== Norway ===
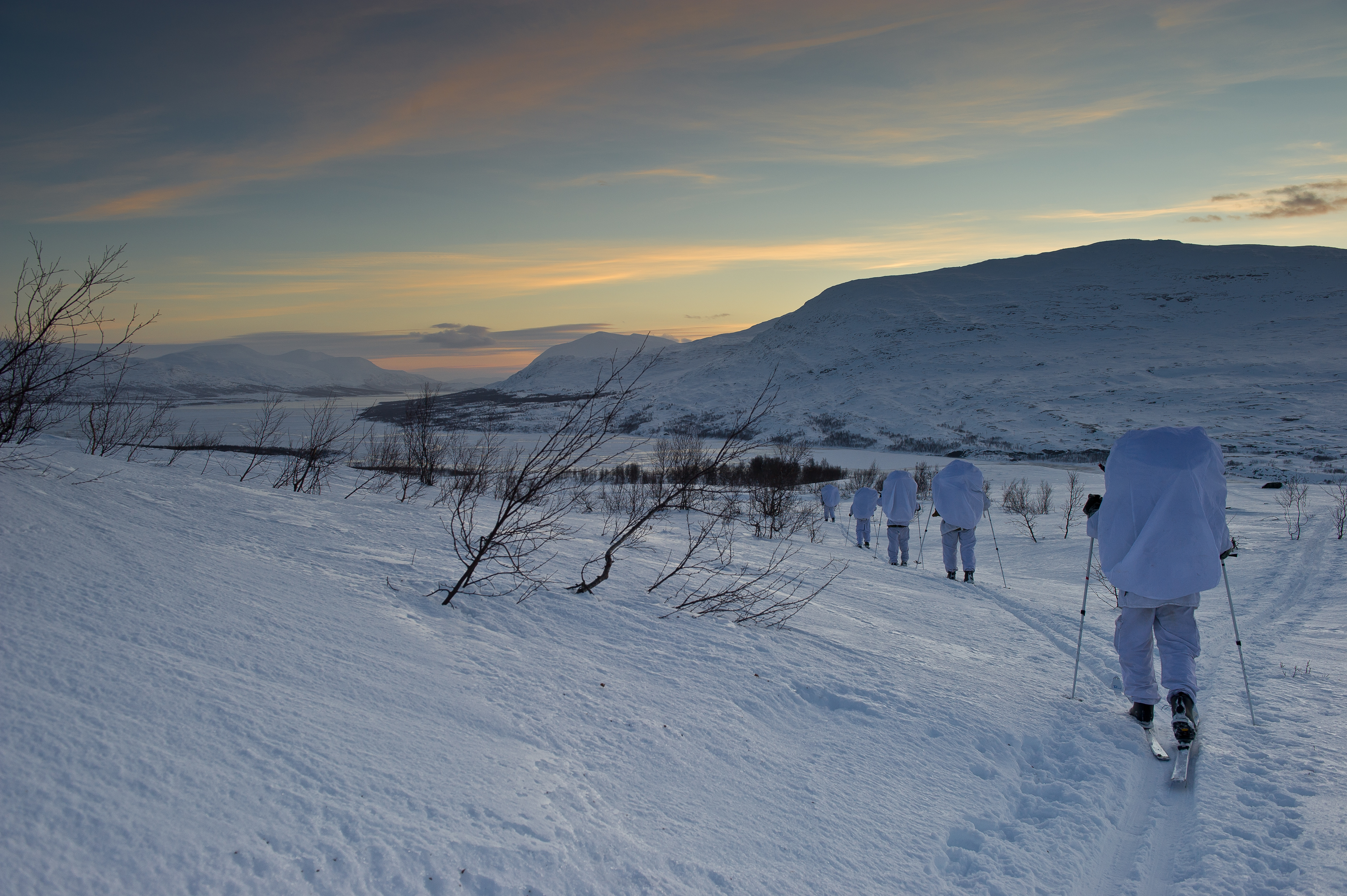
Etterretningsbataljonen ski patrol

The Norwegian Army has LRRP operations dating back to the 1960s, Fjernoppklaring (remote reconnaissance). It was split in two, creating a new group of airborne special forces, Hærens Jegerkommando, and the current LRRP unit Fjernoppklaringseskadronen. Fjernoppklaringseskadronen is part of the Norwegian army under Etterretningsbataljonen (Military Intelligence Battalion).

=== Portugal ===
Presently, in the Portuguese Army, LRRP operations are carried out by the Special Operations Forces.

The Special Actions Detachment of the Portuguese Navy also carries out LRRP missions, mainly in the scope of amphibious operations.

From 1983 to 1993, the Portuguese Army Comando Regiment included the REDES Company, a specialist LRRP unit.

=== Serbia ===
LRRP units within the Serbian Army Special Brigade and 72nd Reconnaissance Commando Battalion have been operating since 1992.

=== Spain ===
LRRP is carried out in Spain by the Advanced Reconnaissance Parachute Company of the Paratroopers Brigade "Almogávares" VI and the Target Acquisition and Reconnaissance (TAR) Company of the HQ Battalion within the Spanish Marine Infantry. In the past long-range reconnaissance patrols of Spanish forces have played a notable role in the Bosnian War, specially the deep reconnaissance patrols carried out by the Special Operations Unit (UOE) of the Spanish marines within the multinational battalion.

=== Sri Lanka ===
Long-range reconnaissance patrols of the Armed forces of Sri Lanka have played a notable role in Sri Lanka's multi-phase military campaign against the Liberation Tigers of Tamil Eelam (LTTE). LRRP members attached to Special forces of the Sri Lankan Army have been most successful in carrying out assassinations on high-ranking members of the LTTE. The LRRP concept was developed by Major Sreepathi Gunasekara who formed a special recon unit named 'Delta Patrols' in 1986 which later evolved into a highly secretive SF LRRP battalion. The Army's 3rd Special forces regiment and 3rd Commando regiment have specialized LRRP battalions .

Until the end of the war, the government kept their very existence under wraps.

=== United Kingdom ===
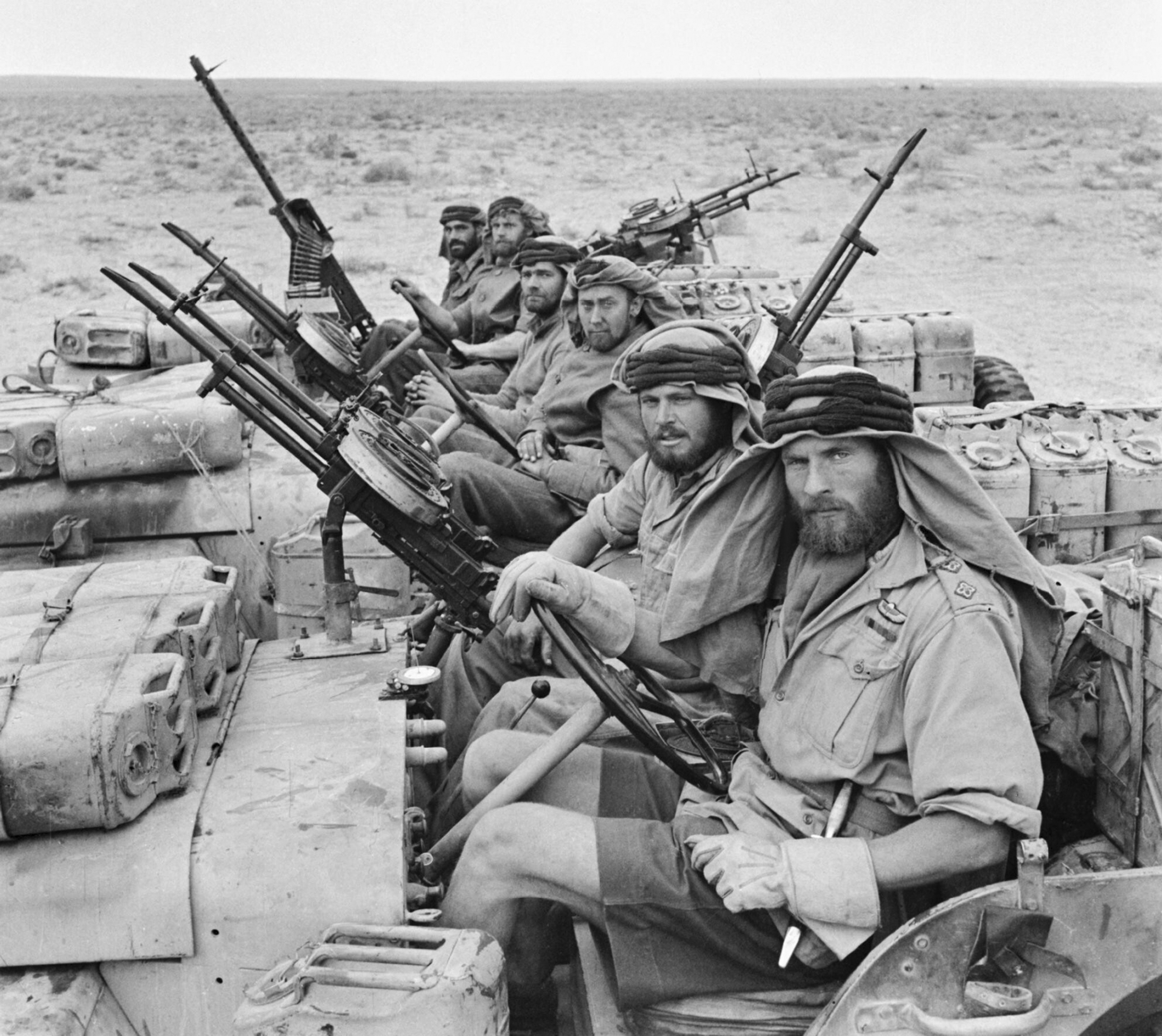
SAS returning from a 1943 patrol in North Africa

The Honourable Artillery Company (HAC) and its regular sister unit, 4/73 (Sphinx) Special Observation Post Battery Royal Artillery, currently operate in the surveillance and target acquisition role.

During the Second World War, the Long Range Desert Group performed long-range reconnaissance and raiding during the North African Campaign and during the Cold War, the Corps Patrol Unit (CPU) consisted of 21 and 23 SAS and the HAC.

==== Cold War ====
The 21 SAS was stood up in 1947 specifically for the task of letting themselves be bypassed and staying-behind in the event of a Soviet Invasion of Western Europe, they were later joined by 23 SAS and in 1973, the Honourable Artillery Company (HAC) which became a Surveillance and Target Acquisition (STA) Patrol Regiment providing Stay-Behind Observation Posts (SBOP) with their three squadrons each with a number of four to six man patrols. HAC provided SBOP capabilities to the HQs of 1st Artillery Brigade (HQ Sqn HAC), 1 Armoured Division (I Sqn HAC), 4 Armoured Division (II Sqn HAC), and 1 BR Corps (III Sqn HAC) with one ‘sabre’ squadron each

=== United States ===
==== World War II ====
The predecessor of the U.S. Army's LRRP teams was the U.S. Sixth Army Special Reconnaissance Unit, better known as the Alamo Scouts. In the South West Pacific Theater of Operations, the Alamo Scouts conducted over 110 intelligence gathering missions behind enemy lines throughout New Guinea and the Philippines during 1944–45. General Walter Krueger established the Alamo Scouts Training Center to train candidates in long-range reconnaissance patrol techniques, including rubber boat handling, intelligence gathering, report writing, scouting and patrolling, jungle navigation, communications, weapons training, and camouflage. Of those that successfully completed the rigorous course, 138 became full-time Alamo Scouts, while the others returned to their units to serve as reconnaissance troops. After Japan's surrender, the Alamo Scouts Training Center was closed down and the unit was disbanded. In 1988, the U.S. Army retroactively awarded members of the Alamo Scouts the Special Forces tab due to their wartime record and the techniques they pioneered.

==== In Germany ====
The modern US Army long-range reconnaissance patrol concept was created in 1956 by the 11th Airborne Division in Augsburg, Germany. They patrolled near the Czechoslovak and East German borders, then members of the Communist Warsaw Pact states, and in event of war in Europe would be inserted behind enemy lines to provide surveillance and to select targets of opportunity. The LRRP concept was well known throughout the Army though concentrated in 7th Army in Germany. Provisional LRRP Companies made up of both trained LRRPs and regular soldiers were put together for a series of exercises called Wintershield and proved themselves in the field. After the 11th Airborne Division was inactivated on 1 July 1958, the Department of the Army authorized two Airborne LRRP companies in 1961: Company D, 17th Infantry and Company C, 58th Infantry in the Wildflecken and Nellingen Barracks (near Stuttgart), and were respectively assigned to V Corps and VII Corps. In 1963, V Corps LRRPs (Company D) transferred to the Gibbs Kaserne in Frankfurt near Corps HQ. In 1965, these companies developed the first LRRP Table of Organization and Equipment and in doing so increased their strength to 208 men, team size from 4 to 5 men, as well as adding an organic transport component. All LRRPs from team leader and above were to be Ranger qualified. The experiences of these two companies formed the basis of the first US Army LRRP manual. Both companies used carrier wave (Morse Code) radios including the AN/TRC-77 for long-range communications to their respective Corps G2 (Intelligence) center. In 1968, both companies were transferred to the United States, but neither were sent to Vietnam because they retained their status as LRRP units for V and VII Corps in the event of war in Europe.

All LRRPs were redesignated as "Ranger" on 1 February 1969, and these two units (companies C and D) respectively became Companies B and A, 75th Infantry (Ranger). They were the only Ranger units to remain on active duty at the end of the Vietnam War and they continued in service until November 1974 when they were inactivated, with most of their personnel forming the core of the new 1st and 2nd Battalions (Ranger), 75th Infantry.

==== In Italy ====
In the 1960s, the U. S. Army Southern European Task Force (SETAF) utilized the Airborne Recon Platoon of the 1st Combat Aviation Company (Provisional) located in Verona, Italy. They provided reconnaissance missions as well as target acquisition and battle damage assessment for SETAF which was a missile command.

The Airborne Recon Platoon was a LRRP unit that served as the “eyes and ears” for SETAF. During the period of 1961-62 Lieutenant James D. James commanded the platoon. Three years later in 1965 when Captain James served in Vietnam with the 1st Cavalry Division he utilized much of the tactics, structure, and doctrine of the Airborne Recon Platoon when creating Company E, 52nd Infantry (LRP). Captain James retired from the army as a colonel.

==== In Vietnam ====
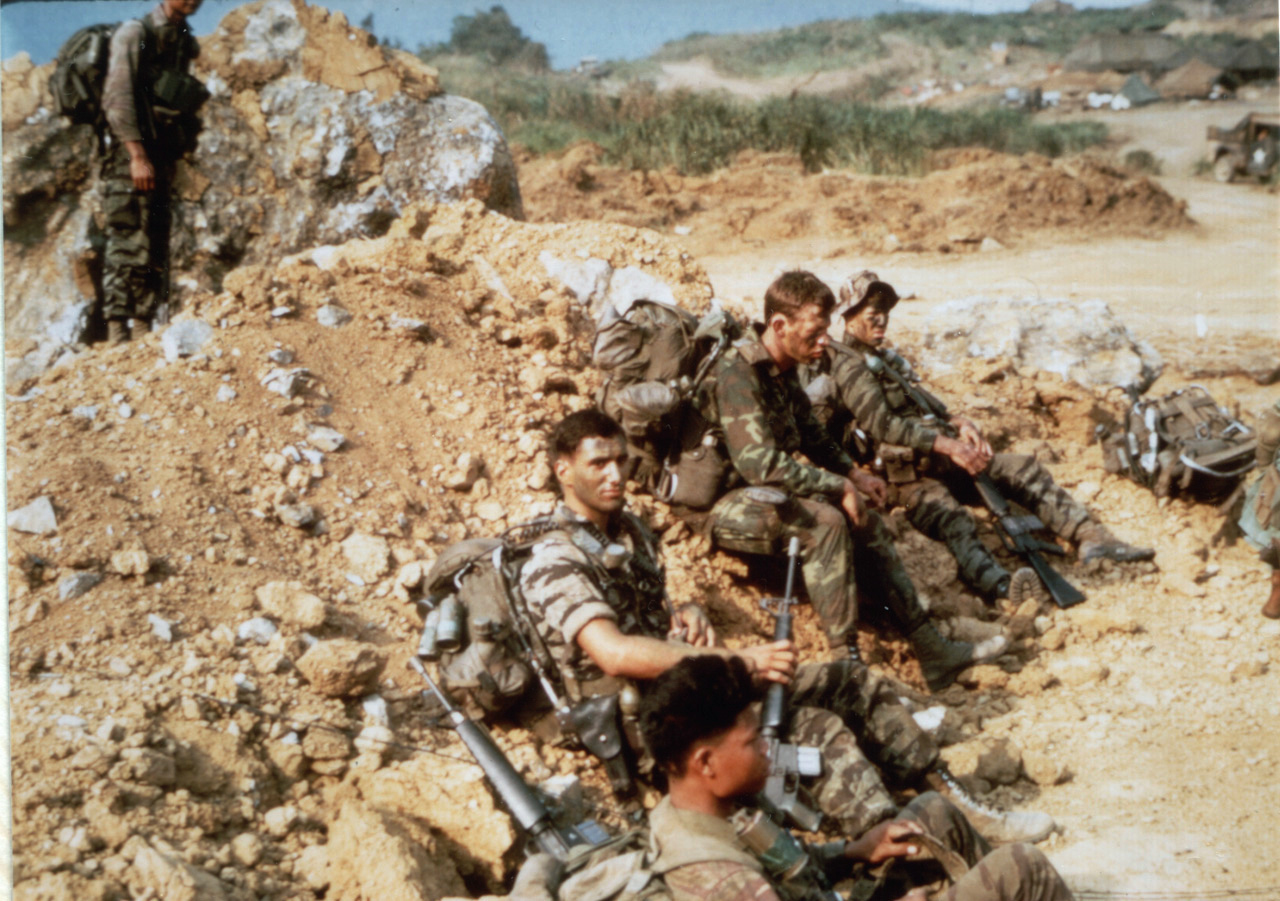
April 1968. LRPs at LZ Stud near Khe Sanh combat base, Vietnam.

In December 1965, the 1st Brigade, 101st Airborne Division, formed a LRRP platoon, and by April 1966, the 1st Infantry Division, 25th Infantry Division and each of the four Battalions of the 173rd Airborne Brigade formed LRRP units as well. On 8 July 1966, General William Westmoreland authorized the formation of a (LRRP) unit in each infantry brigade or division in Vietnam. By 1967 formal LRRP companies were organized, most having three platoons, each with five six-man teams equipped with VHF/FM AN/PRC-25 radios. LRRP training was notoriously rigorous and team leaders were often graduates of the U.S. Army's 5th Special Forces Group Recondo School in Nha Trang, Vietnam.

Tiger Force was the nickname of an infamous long-range reconnaissance patrol unit of the 1st Battalion (Airborne), 327th Infantry Regiment, 1st Brigade (Separate), 101st Airborne Division, which fought in the Vietnam War, and was responsible for counterinsurgency operations against the North Vietnamese People's Army of Vietnam (PAVN) and Viet Cong.

The platoon-sized unit, approximately 45 paratroopers, was founded by Colonel David Hackworth in November 1965 to "outguerrilla the guerrillas". Tiger Force (Recon) 1-327th was a highly decorated small unit in Vietnam, and paid for its reputation with heavy casualties. In October 1968, Tiger Force's parent battalion was awarded the Presidential Unit Citation by President Lyndon B. Johnson, which included a mention of Tiger Force's service at Đắk Tô in June 1966.

Since satellite communications were not invented yet, one of the most known long-range penetration operations of the war was launched by members of Company E, 52nd Infantry (LRP) of the 1st Air Cavalry Division, against the PAVN when they seized "Signal Hill" the name attributed to the peak of Dong Re Lao Mountain, a densely forested 4,879 feet (1,487 m) mountain, midway in A Shau Valley, so its 1st and 3rd Brigades, who would be fighting behind a wall of mountains, could communicate with Camp Evans near the coast or with approaching aircraft.

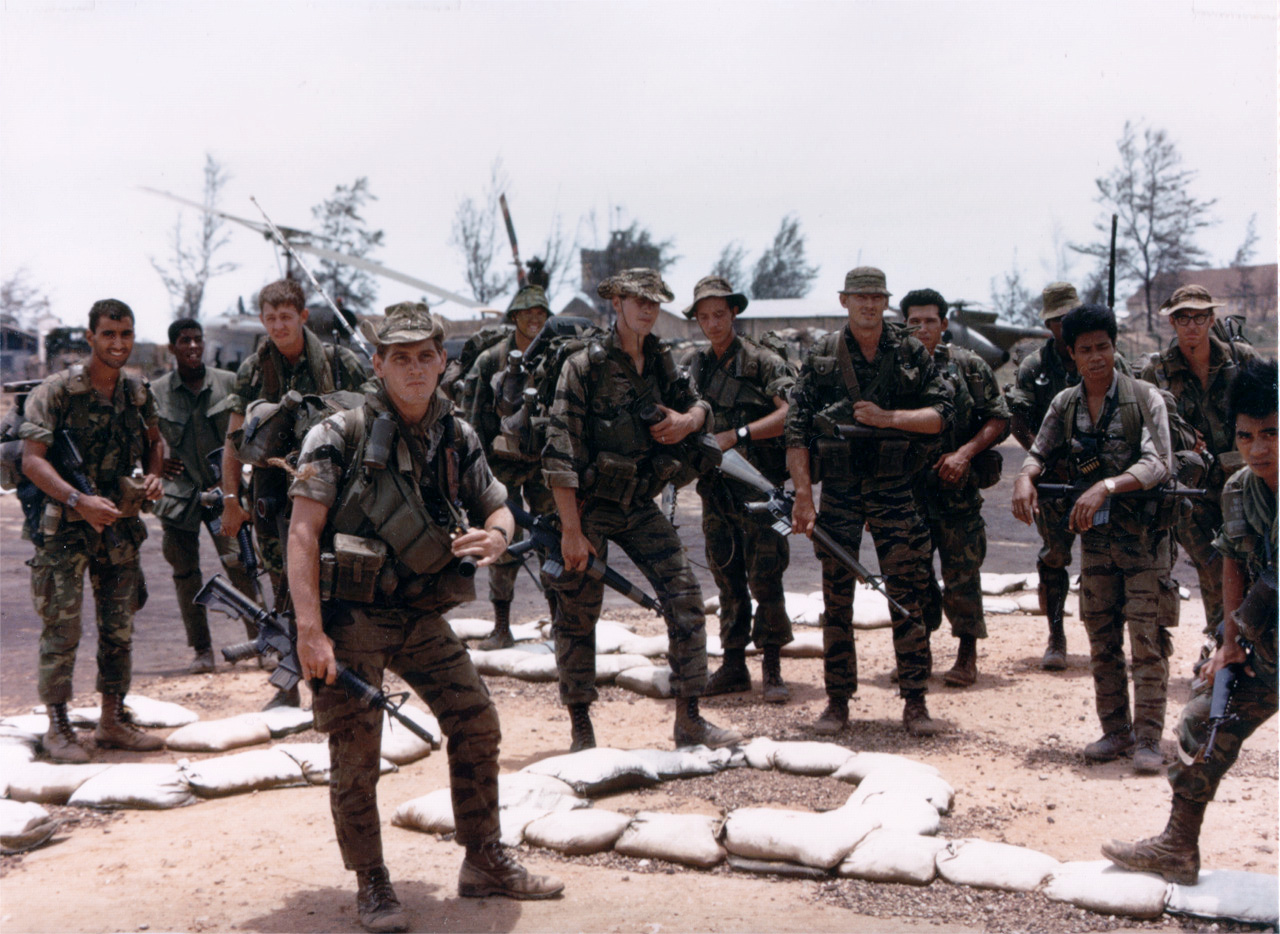
July 1968. Two 1st Cavalry Division LRP teams, Quang Tri, Vietnam.

The US Marine Corps also performed long-range reconnaissance missions typically assigned to Marine Recon, especially Force Recon at the corps-level (i.e., Marine Expeditionary Force (MEF)) level, as opposed to the Battalion Recon units answering to battalion commanders. Marine Recon teams typically were twice as large as Army LRRPs and were more heavily armed, however, sacrificing a degree of stealth. In addition, the Marines did not employ indigenous Montagnards as front and rear scouts as Army LRRPs and Special Forces teams did which proved invaluable in confusing the enemy if contact was made. The tactical employment of LRRPs was later evaluated to be generally used far too dangerously by commanders, who were pleased by the kill ratios of LRRPs teams (reported as high as 400 enemy troops for every LRRP killed). Writes one commentator: "During the course of the war Lurps conducted around 23,000 long-range patrols, of this amount two-thirds resulted in enemy sightings." LRRPs also accounted for approximately 10,000 enemy KIA through ambushes, air strikes, and artillery.

In February 1969, all US Army LRRP units were folded into the newly formed 75th Infantry Regiment (Ranger), a predecessor of the 75th Ranger Regiment, bringing back operational Ranger units for the first time since the Korean War. The Army had inactivated Ranger units after Korea, but kept Ranger School, on the premise that spreading Ranger School graduates throughout the Army would improve overall performance. The initial Ranger companies formed in 1969 were: "A" V Corps, Fort Hood, Texas; "B" VII Corps, Fort Lewis, Washington; "C" I Field Force, Vietnam; "D" II Field Force, Vietnam; "E" 9th Infantry Division, Vietnam; F 25th Infantry Division, Vietnam; "G" 23d Infantry Division, Vietnam; "H" 1st Cavalry Division, Vietnam; "I" 1st Infantry Division, Vietnam; "K" 4th Infantry Division, Vietnam; "L" 101st Airborne Division, Vietnam; "M" 199th Light Infantry Brigade, Vietnam; "N" 173d Airborne Brigade, Vietnam; "O" 3d Brigade, 82d Airborne Division, Vietnam; and "P" 1st Brigade, 5th Infantry Division (Mechanized), Vietnam. Following its mobilization for Vietnam service, Company D (Ranger), 151st Infantry of the Indiana Army National Guard (They maintained their identity with the 151st Infantry Regiment, instead of converting to the 75th Infantry, but their designation switched from LRP to Ranger along with the other LRP companies in Vietnam) completed its tour in Vietnam and, as it departed, Company D (Ranger), 75th Infantry was raised to replace it. Company F (LRP), 425th Infantry of the Michigan Army National Guard and Company E (Ranger) 65th Infantry of the Puerto Rico Army National Guard were not mobilized or sent to Vietnam. As National Guard units, D-151st, E-65th, and F-425th retained their regimental designations and were not reflagged as companies of the 75th Infantry.

As the Vietnam War matured, I Field Force LRRPs widened their area of operation to include I Corps and II Corps, and II Field Force LRRPs respectively included III Corps and IV Corps.

==== Post-Vietnam ====
The legacy of LRRP units later continued with the U.S. Army's Long Range Surveillance (both detachments and companies), which have been dropped from the force structure and inactivated, and exists today in the dismounted reconnaissance troops of Reconnaissance, Surveillance, and Target Acquisition squadrons.

== NATO International Long Range Reconnaissance Patrol School ==
In 1977, Belgium, the Netherlands, and the United Kingdom sent instructors to Germany to work on the planning of an international long-range reconnaissance patrol (LRRP) school. From 1979 onward, joint training for LRRP and military stay-behind units was conducted at NATO's International Long Range Reconnaissance Patrol School (ILRRPS) in Weingarten, Germany, under the lead of UK SF. British SAS, German Fernspäher, Dutch Marines, Belgian Para-Commandos, US SF, and others worked and trained together on a daily basis. ILRRPS provided specialist training to allow soldiers to operate effectively in gathering intelligence behind enemy lines. Courses included Long Range Reconnaissance, Combat Survival (E&E and resistance to interrogation), Advanced WP Specialist Recognition, Close Quarter Battle and so on. TRISTAR, a NATO LRRP exercise originally sponsored by the SAS, was conducted annually. In May 2001, the ILRRPS was renamed the International Special Training Center (ISTC).

== See also ==
- Battle of Signal Hill
- Commando
- Company E, 52nd Infantry (LRP)
- Long-range penetration
- Long Range Surveillance Detachment
- LRP ration
- Operation Delaware
- Patrolling
- Recondo School
- Special reconnaissance
- United States Army Rangers
- United States Army Reconnaissance and Surveillance Leaders Course
