= Canadian Rangers =

Canadian Army Reserve sub-component

- Rangers canadiens
- Emblem of the Canadian Rangers
- Active: 1942–present
- Country: Canada
- Branch: Canadian Army
- Type: Guide and scouting role
- Role: Domestic operations; surveillance and sovereignty patrols; wilderness survival
- Size: 5,000
- Part of: Canadian Army Reserve
- Garrison/HQ: Canadian Ranger National Authority, Canadian Army Staff, Ottawa
- Motto: Vigilans (Latin for 'the watchers')
- Colors: Red and green
- Engagements: Second World War; Cold War
- Website: canada.ca/en/army/corporate/canadian-rangers.html

Commanders
- Head: Charles III, King of Canada
- Commander of the Canadian Army: Lieutenant-General Michael Wright

Insignia
- NATO Map Symbol (2017)

The Canadian Rangers (French: Rangers canadiens) are a sub-component of the Canadian Army Reserve under Canadian Armed Forces reserves that provides a limited military presence in regions of Canada where stationing conventional Army units would not be practical or economically viable. Formally established on May 23, 1947, the Canadian Rangers employs around 5,000 Rangers.

The Canadian Rangers are responsible for remote, isolated, and sparsely populated regions of Canada, such as Northern Canada and the coastlines. They regularly conduct surveillance, sovereignty patrols (SOVPATS), and inspections of the North Warning System. They also act as guides, scouts, and subject-matter experts in such disciplines as wilderness survival when other forces and Army components are in their area of operations.

== Organization ==
The Canadian Rangers are a unit of the Canadian Armed Forces Army Reserve made up of a diverse group of Canadians. Though there is a misconception that the Canadian Rangers is an Indigenous unit, many Rangers are not First Nations, Inuit or Métis; the makeup of each unit simply depends on where the patrol resides.

The Canadian Rangers provide a limited military presence in Canada's remote areas and receive 12 days per year of formal training (often more days of training are offered but attendance is not mandatory). They are considered to be somewhat always on duty, observing and reporting as part of their daily lives. Canadian Rangers are paid when formally on duty according to the rank they hold within their patrol and when present on operations or during training events. They are paid in accordance with the standard rates of pay for Class-A (part-time) or Class-B (full-time) Reserve forces, except when they are called out for search and rescue missions or domestic operations (such as fighting floods and wildfires), when they are paid as Class-C Reserves and receive the full Regular Force pay and benefits.

The 5,000 Canadian Rangers are split between five Canadian Ranger patrol groups (CRPGs), commanded by lieutenant-colonels and each allocated to a Canadian division (except 1 CRPG, which is currently allocated to Joint Task Force North).

- 1 CRPG: Yukon, Northwest Territories, Nunavut, British Columbia
- 2 CRPG: Quebec
- 3 CRPG: Ontario
- 4 CRPG: British Columbia, Alberta, Saskatchewan, Manitoba
- 5 CRPG: Newfoundland and Labrador

Each CRPG is unique in its make-up, according to its area of responsibility, its geography, and its ethnic make-up. For instance, 3 CRPG, headquartered in Borden, Ontario, has a single province as its area of operations (AO), while 4 CRPG with its headquarters in Victoria, British Columbia, has four provinces. Thus the unit structures between 3 CRPG and 4 CRPG are very different. 3 CRPG has a unit HQ that contains all its full-time staff and has a number of Canadian Ranger patrols throughout the northern region of its province, whereas 4 CRPG has a unit HQ, a number of traditional sub-units ("companies"), and each company has a number of Canadian Ranger patrols. In all cases, it is the job of the Army full-time staff (mostly Class-B Reserve personnel, except for 1 CRPG whose full-time staff are predominantly Regular Force) allocated to the CRPGs to lead and administer the Canadian Ranger patrols in their unit. The patrols themselves are in various remote, isolated, or coastal communities around Canada and each Canadian Ranger patrol is based on such a community. Canadian Ranger patrols are (on average) approximately 30 members strong (the equivalent of a platoon in a conventional Canadian Army unit) and are led by sergeants. The patrols are further divided into the patrol HQ consisting of the patrol commander (sergeant) and the patrol second-in-command (2IC, a master corporal) and 10-member sections, each commanded by a master corporal who is assisted by a corporal.

== Pacific Coast Militia Rangers ==
Modern Canadian Rangers can trace their heritage back to the Pacific Coast Militia Rangers (PCMR). Formed on March 3, 1942, the Pacific Coast Militia Rangers were volunteers who patrolled, performed military surveillance, and provided local defence of the coastline of British Columbia and in Yukon against the wartime threat of a possible Japanese invasion. At their height, the PCMR consisted of 15,000 volunteers in 138 companies under three major patrol areas, which were Vancouver Island, the lower Fraser Valley and the Bridge River area. Some of the principal officers of the PCMR were Lieutenant-Colonel Cyrus Wesley Peck VC, Lieutenant-Colonel A.L. Coote and Major H. Ashby. The Pacific Coast Militia Rangers were disbanded on September 30, 1945, after Japan's surrender in the Second World War.

== Equipment ==
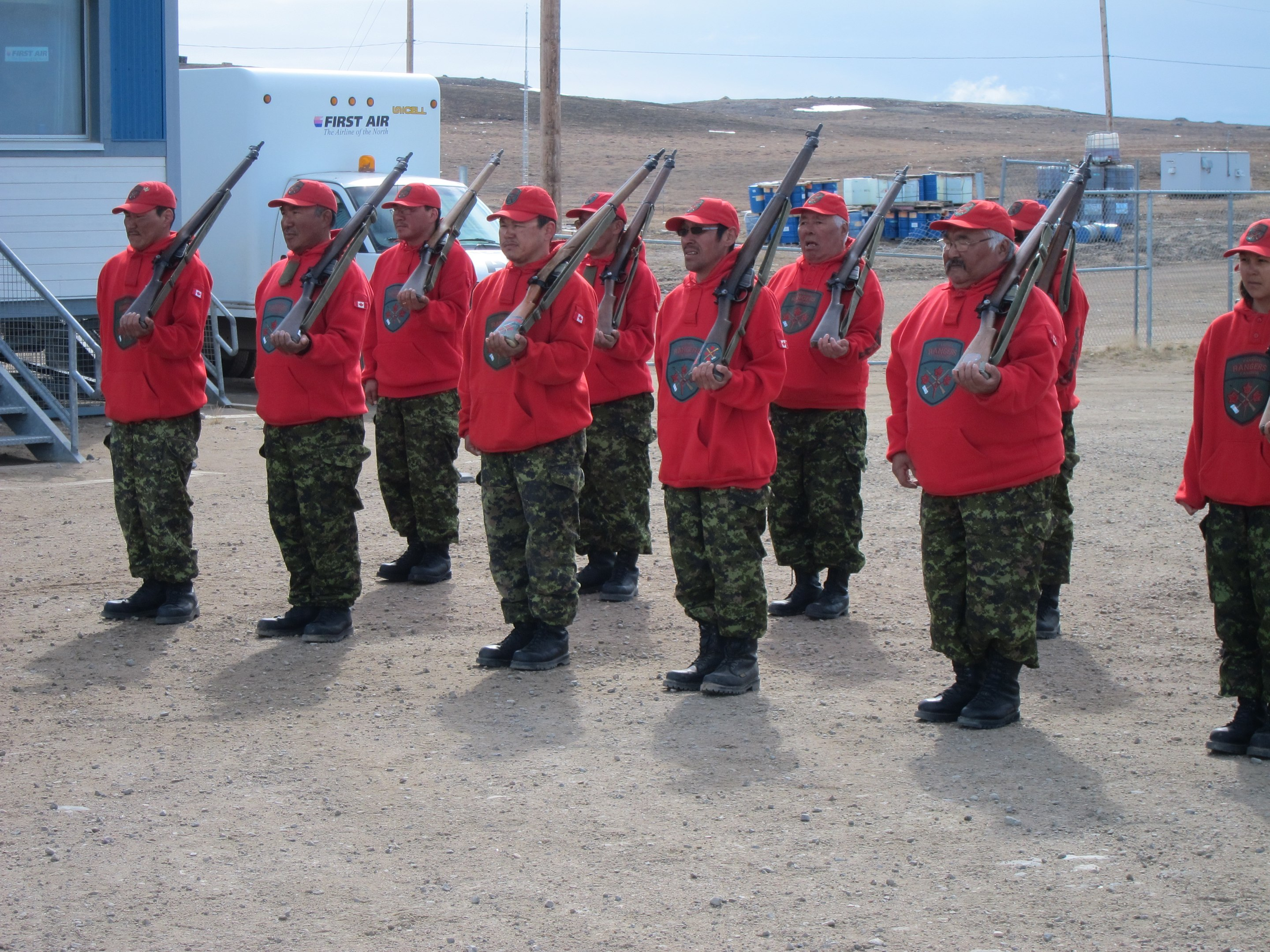
Canadian Rangers with Lee–Enfield Rifle No. 4 rifles in 2011

Each Canadian Ranger is issued a red Canadian Ranger sweatshirt, CADPAT pants, combat boots, baseball cap, safety vest, rifle and navigation aids. They are expected to be mostly self-reliant regarding equipment. However, they are also provided with a small amount of patrol-level stores (mostly camp stores – tents, stoves, lanterns, axes, etc.). They are reimbursed for the use of personal vehicles and equipment and are paid for this use according to the nationally established equipment usage rates. Items that a Canadian Ranger could be reimbursed for include snowmobiles (called light over-snow vehicles, or LOSVs, in the military), all-terrain vehicles, watercraft, trailers, pack horses, sled dog teams, and a variety of tools and equipment (such as radios, chainsaws, generators, and the like).

== Weapons ==
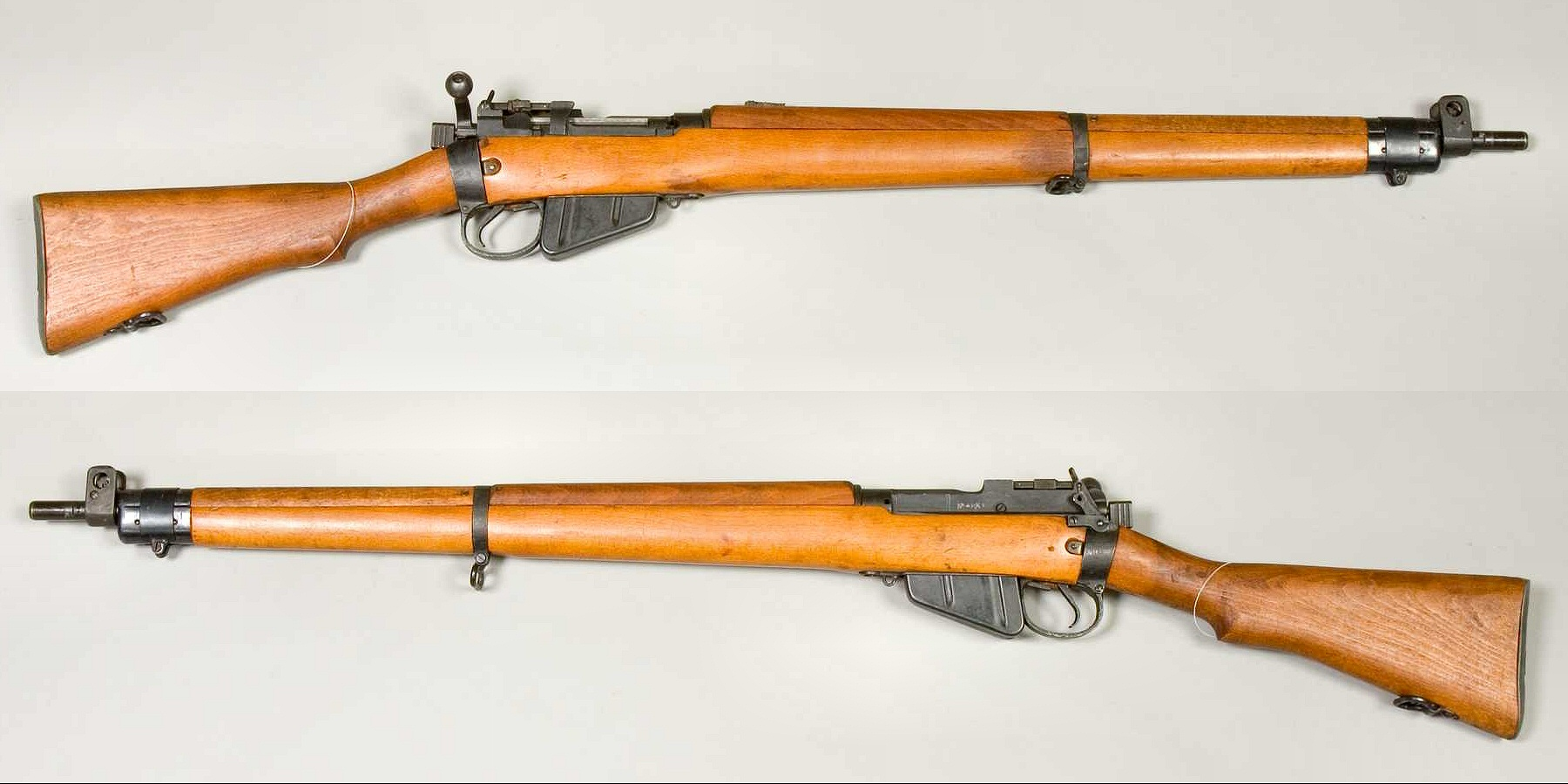
Lee–Enfield No. 4 Mk I

Since 1947, the Canadian Rangers were issued the Lee–Enfield No 4 rifle in .303 British calibre, with each user being provided with 200 rounds of ammunition every year.

At the outset of the Second World War, the rest of the Canadian Army was equipping with Enfield rifles, Bren guns, Webley revolvers, and Browning-Inglis Hi Power pistols, and Canadian production of these weapons was badly needed for overseas service. The Pacific Coast Militia Rangers thus had to make do with what was readily available, often patrolling with their own rifles and shotguns. This led Canadian purchasing agents to look to American sources for rifles. At the time the most popular style of rifle in the North American West was the .30WCF (.30-30 calibre) lever action. As such, purchasers considered that the Winchester 1894 and Marlin 36 would be easy for the PCMR members to use, as they more than likely had experience with the type already. As a stop-gap until Lee-Enfield rifles became available in numbers for issue, some 3000 Winchesters and an estimated 1800 Marlins were promptly acquired direct from North Haven, Connecticut, United States (likely all these firms had on hand). Guns were issued as needed to senior members of the companies, but stocks of .30-30 ammunition was so limited that only six rounds were issued with the rifle while the rest was locked up in the company's armoury, typically in the vault of the local bank.

The bolt action Lee–Enfield was then issued to the PCMR as the standard rifle later during the war, and it continued to be used by the Canadian Rangers when they were established in 1947. Due to the economy of the .303 (there were thousands left over after the war) and the robust nature of the rifle (especially in conditions such as extreme cold), it was not replaced even after being taken out of general service in the remainder of the Canadian military in the 1950s. It remained in service with the Canadian Rangers for over 70 years and has proven to be most reliable in adverse conditions even in the Canadian Arctic environment.

With the issue of the Colt Canada C19 as their new service rifle in 2015, the Canadian Rangers were officially gifted their retired Lee-Enfields by the Canadian Armed Forces.

=== Rifle replacement ===
Owing to the decreasing availability of spare parts, the replacement of the Lee–Enfield rifle had long been expected, and in August 2011, after user requirements had been determined, the Canadian Forces officially issued a tender request for a bolt-action rifle compatible with 7.62×51mm NATO and .308 Winchester ammunition. Approximately 10,000 rifles were to be bought giving the system a service life of about 30 years. Project management was provided by the Canadian Army's Director Land Resources (DLR). The new rifles are a Finnish SAKO design, based on the Tikka T3 compact tactical rifle (CTR). The rifle was manufactured under licence by Colt Canada, set to be in service by 2018. The tender was cancelled in October 2011 due to contractual issues and a new tender was issued in 2014 for replacement rifles with a selection competition in 2015 and the winning design entering service between 2015 and 2019. In April 2015, Colt Canada was selected to produce the rifle under licence. Thirty-three initial examples of the new rifle based on the CTR were delivered to the 4th Canadian Ranger Patrol Group (4 CRPG) in Victoria, British Columbia, in June 2015, while Canadian Ranger instructors from across all CRPGs concurrently attended "train-the-trainer" training at the Small Arms section at the Combat Training Centre, CFB Gagetown, New Brunswick. "Uncontrolled testing" was completed with 100 rifles in Nunavut in August 2015, while controlled testing was conducted in November 2015 in the British Columbia interior, facilitated by 4 CRPG. The rifles were tested to ensure they would fire properly and remain accurate at temperatures as low as −51 °C (−60 °F) (laboratory conditions), as well as remain robust and serviceable amidst the rigours of transportation in vehicles and in particular on all-terrain vehicles. They are expected to stop all large predators, including polar bears. Feedback from the Canadian Rangers was generally very positive, with only minor adjustments required, and was incorporated in the final production rifles.

The rifle features a heavy-taper stainless steel barrel, a detachable 10-round double-stack box magazine, custom iron sights calibrated from 100 to 600 metres, a specially laminated wooden stock with a unique reddish-grey pattern in the wood grain, stainless steel construction with extra corrosion resistant coatings, and enlarged trigger guards and bolt handles so they can be used without removing gloves. The barrel, bolt and receiver are made by Colt Canada under licence from SAKO. In addition to the rifle, the accessories package includes a custom-moulded Pelican hard transport case (suitable for commercial aircraft transportation), plus a soft transport case for vehicles, such as snowmobiles and ATVs. The rifle is also outfitted with a custom sling, extra magazines, a trigger lock and custom cleaning kit. The rifle's hard case and soft case, as well as the rifle butt stock feature the Canadian Ranger badge. The Ranger badge on the rifle stock is engraved and in black relief. The rifle is designated the C19 rifle. Ammunition for the C19 is a proprietary .308 Winchester round made in Quebec solely for the C-19 and consists of the pairing of existing Canadian Forces' match (sniper) brass cases, paired with the Nosler Accubond 180-grain (12 g) bullet. The ammunition designation is the C-180 round.

As of 2015 the DND planned to buy 6,820 rifles. Including development costs, spare parts, and two million rounds of ammunition, the rifles were expected to cost $28 million.

== Chain of command ==
The Canadian Rangers became part of the Canadian Army in October 2007, having previously been under the vice chief of the Defence Staff for the Canadian Armed Forces. The commander of the Canadian Army is the Canadian Ranger National Authority (CRNA), but, this role is delegated down to the Army chief of staff reserve (ACOS Res), a brigadier-general. The commander of the Canadian Army has a small cadre of CRNA staff in Ottawa, headed by a Class-A (part-time) lieutenant-colonel and consisting of a full-time major and a small number of captains and master warrant officers. The conduit between the CRNA staff and the ACOS Res is the director Army Reserve (DARes), a full colonel. These CRNA staff act as a conduit for information, assist with general development and improvement, assist in generating, modifying, and maintaining policy that addresses the unique nature of the Canadian Rangers (including administrative policy, unit establishment and structure, training policy, and logistical policy), and with the financing (overall funding model) of the Canadian Rangers. These staff are not directly within the chain of command and have no authority over the CRPGs, but, are instead seen as the technical and advisory link between the Canadian Ranger units and the commander of the Canadian Army.

Command and control of the respective Canadian Ranger units (known as Canadian Ranger patrol groups or CRPGs) is devolved from the commander of the Canadian Army down to his subordinate commanders of the various regional divisions. There are five CRPGs, which tend to be provincially oriented, apart from 1 CRPG, which covers the whole of northern Canada north of the 60th parallel, and 4 CRPG, which covers the four western provinces (British Columbia, Alberta, Saskatchewan, and Manitoba). Each CRPG has a headquarters and a number of patrols, albeit that 4 CRPG's patrols are managed within a company construct, with provincially oriented companies each commanding their own patrols. The patrols tend to be centred on remote communities and are frequently named after the town or village they are from (the Terrace Patrol, in British Columbia, for instance).

Prince Charles (since September 8, 2022, Charles III, King of Canada) was made honorary head of the Canadian Rangers and he and his wife, Camilla, Duchess of Cornwall (now Queen Camilla), were each given the Rangers' red sweatshirt and baseball cap by David Illituk of Kugaaruk, Nunavut; Joseph Catholique of Łutselkʼe, Northwest Territories; Michael Cameron of Salluit, Quebec; and Kelly Suits of Carcross, Yukon, at Rideau Hall on November 10, 2009.

== Patrol areas ==
There are five main patrol areas of the Canadian Rangers. Each patrol area is directly controlled by the headquarters unit of a Canadian Ranger patrol group or CRPG (French: groupe de patrouilles des Rangers canadiens, GPRC).

Patrol group	Region	Patrols	Rangers	Junior Rangers	Headquarters
1CRPG	Northwest Territories, Yukon Territory, Nunavut	56	2,000	1,500	CFNA HQ Yellowknife, Northwest Territories
2CRPG	Quebec	25	696	585	CFB Saint-Jean, Quebec
3CRPG	Ontario	15	422	440	CFB Borden, Ontario
4CRPG	Manitoba, British Columbia, Saskatchewan, Alberta	43	1,400	800	CFB Esquimalt, British Columbia
5CRPG	Newfoundland and Labrador	32	950	375	Gander, Newfoundland and Labrador

== Junior Canadian Rangers ==
The Junior Canadian Rangers (JCR) program was created on May 31, 1996, and has more than 3,400 members in 119 locations. Each CRPG is responsible for facilitating the JCRs and receive separate national funding for JCR activity facilitation. Each Canadian Ranger patrol has at least a couple of Canadian Rangers who directly look after the JCRs, and JCR instructors are part of the CRPG's full-time staff. At the national level, the Junior Canadian Ranger program is maintained by the National Cadet and Junior Canadian Ranger Group, commanded by a brigadier-general. The program is open to Canadians from ages 12 to 18.

== Freedoms ==
The Canadian Rangers have received the Freedom of several locations throughout its history; these include:

- Yukon August 22, 2022: Dawson City.

== See also ==
- Operation Hurricane (Canada)
- William, Prince of Wales, appointed honorary member of the Canadian Rangers on November 10, 2009
- Catherine, Princess of Wales, appointed honorary member of the Canadian Rangers on July 5, 2011
- Prince Harry, Duke of Sussex, former honorary member of the Canadian Rangers from November 10, 2009 – March 31, 2020.

=== Similar units of other countries ===
- Regional Force Surveillance Units, Australia
  - 51st Battalion, Far North Queensland Regiment
  - NORFORCE
  - Pilbara Regiment
- Home Guard (Sweden)
- Sirius Dog Sled Patrol, Denmark
- Gilgit-Baltistan Scouts, Pakistan
