= Recondo =

American military acronym

Recondo is an American military acronym (from RECONnaissance commanDO) for a highly specialized infantry training or a graduate of a Recondo School who leads a small, heavily armed long-range reconnaissance team that patrols deep in enemy-held territory.

== History ==
The Recondo School was located approximately 20 miles from the outer drop zones on the Fort Bragg military reservation in North Carolina. Five classes a year trained about 50 students each in a grueling three week class. For the first two weeks, classes began at 4:00 a.m. with a five-mile run, physical training, breakfast and instruction. In the final week, the day began with a helicopter jump, with assessment of patrolling practically nonstop until students arrived back at the school.

=== 101st Airborne Division ===
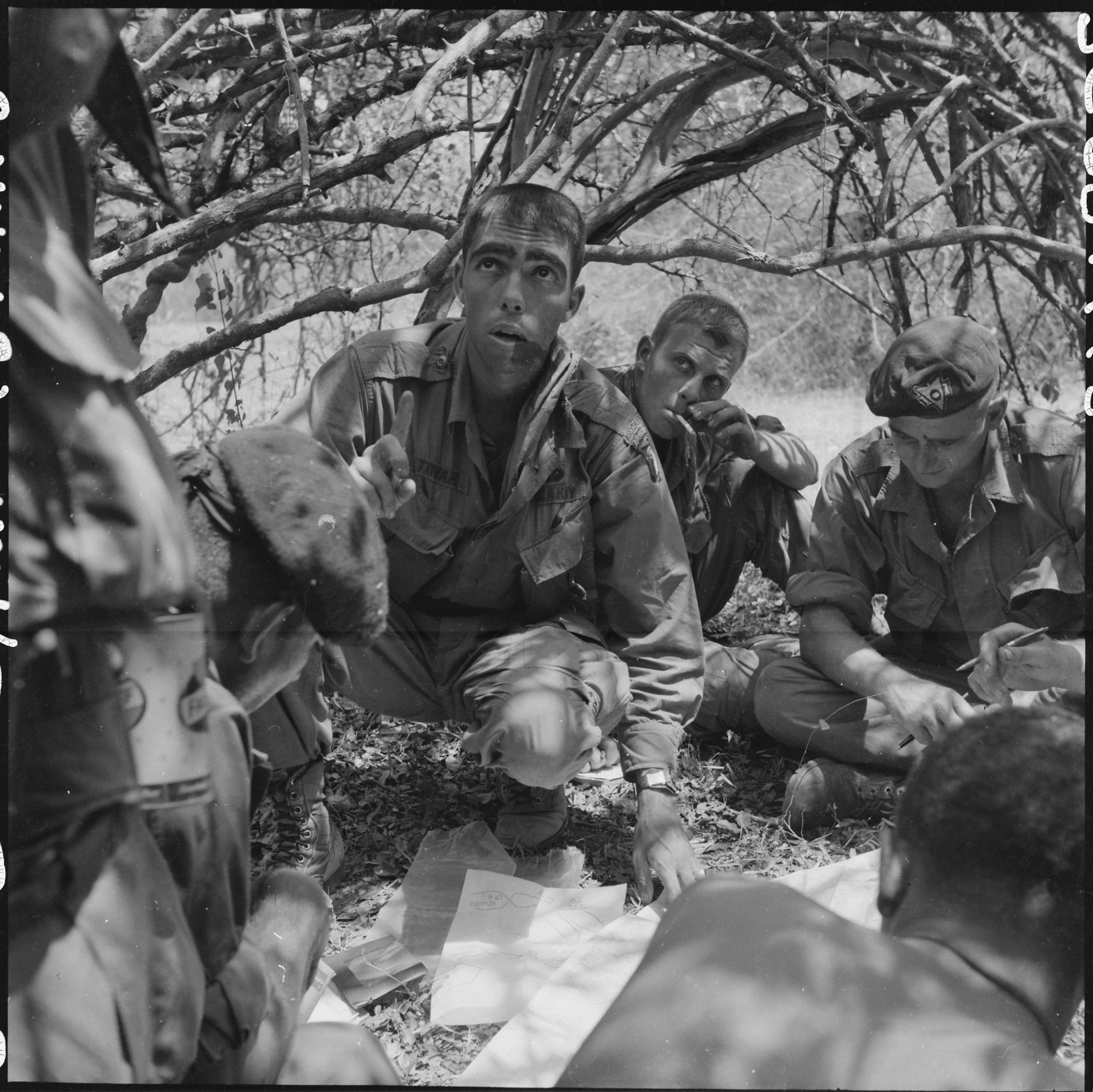
First Lieutenant Tovar of the 101st Recondos gives instructions to his squad leaders while on Operation Farafot IV.

In late 1958 Commanding General of the 101st Airborne Division, Major General William Westmoreland, noticed a lack of proficiency in squad, fire team and patrol leaders during Exercise White Cloud. General Westmoreland was a veteran of the Normandy invasion and knew the importance of small unit leaders and individuals separated from their parent companies to take initiative against superior enemy forces.

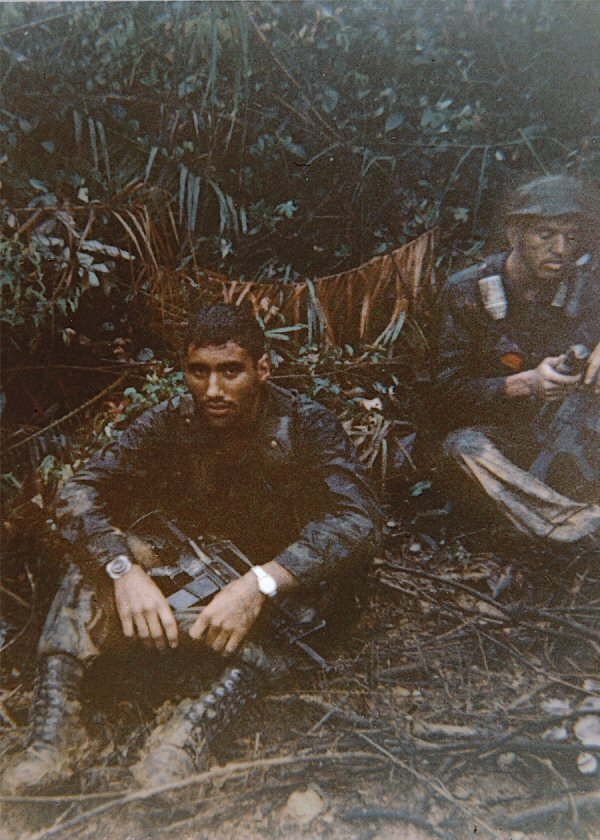
Recondo School trained men for the harsh rigors of long-range patrolling.

The United States Army sent many of their officers and senior non-commissioned officers to the eight-week Ranger School. However, since not every unit leader could be sent to the course, Ranger School graduates were expected to train their platoon or squad members in Ranger tactics. Thus, when it was suggested to General Westmoreland that some of the 101st Airborne's Ranger trained personnel start a school for the entire division in Ranger tactics, Westmoreland recommended that Major Lewis Millett command the school. The name chosen was "Recondo" for Reconnaissance Commando.

The course stressed improvised demolitions, the art of patrolling and intelligence gathering, recognition of enemy vehicles, woodlands survival (including a segment on snake handling), land navigation, rappelling, firearms skills of allied and enemy weapons, and aggressive hand-to-hand combat drills. These skills were formerly part of the Airborne curriculum during World War II. They were dropped in favor of producing qualified paratroopers; it was seen as more effective to provide the extra training through other courses rather than fail candidates who had passed the main airborne portion.

The exercises involved an airborne insertion followed by patrolling, ambush, antitank, and sabotage missions, escape, and evasion techniques. Leadership duties would rotate between fire-team and squad members to test and demonstrate the troopers' abilities. The module ended with the platoon being captured by the enemy, taken to a simulated POW camp and resisting interrogation. Troopers who received poor evaluations were transferred out of the division.

==== Insignia ====
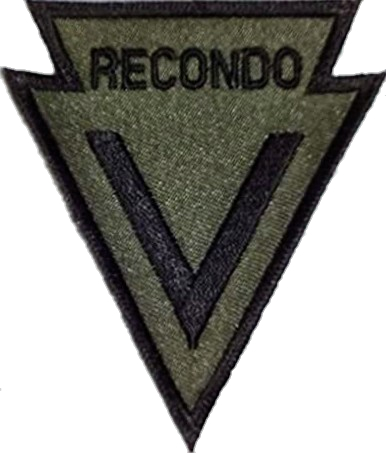
Recondo patch

Since the school would specialize in small unit reconnaissance tactics the Recondo insignia was designed to resemble a downward-pointing arrowhead to signify assault from the sky and the hunting and tracking skills of an American Indian. It was also white and black to signify day and night operations, though when worn in combat it was black and olive-drab. To distinguish soldiers trained in the States from those later trained in Vietnam, a large "V" was added beneath the word "Recondo" printed on top. The Recondo patch was worn on each graduate's right breast pocket. To avoid confusion, the graduate of the school would be considered a "Recondo" rather than "Ranger" trained; the latter being a graduate of the Army Ranger School.

In 1967 the Recondo school at Ft. Campbell converted to a provisional long-range reconnaissance patrol unit prior to deploying in Vietnam.

=== West Point (1960–1963) ===
In 1960, General Westmoreland became Superintendent of the United States Military Academy at West Point where he created a Recondo school for the cadets. The Recondo course was later changed to a challenge that individual cadets could undertake and it still exists today.

=== Vietnam War (1965–1970) ===
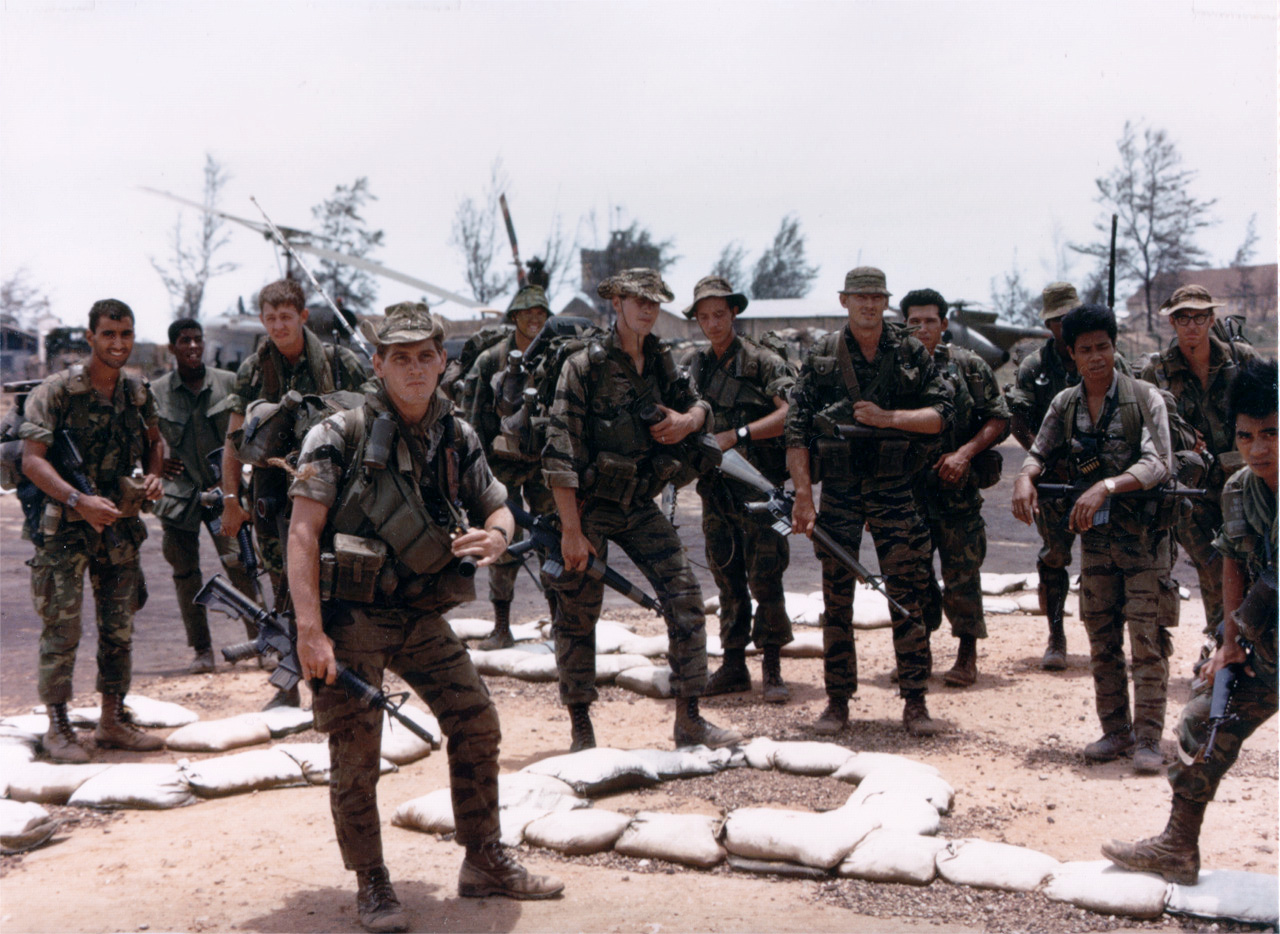
July 1968, two 1st Cav LRP teams. All team leaders were Recondo grads.

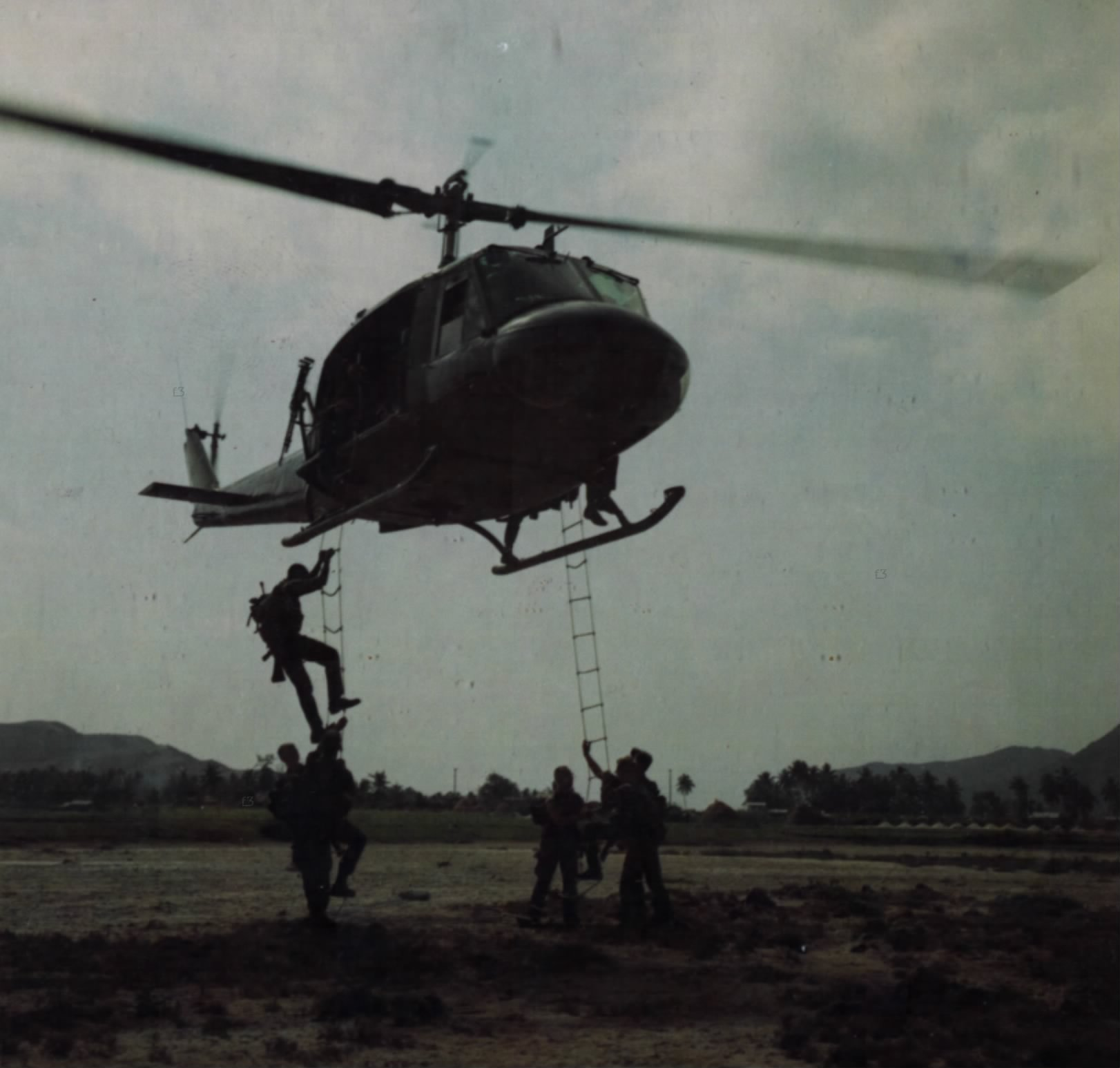
Students climb a ladder to a UH-1D, MACV Recondo School, Nha Trang, 18 March 1969

When General Westmoreland became commander of the American forces in Vietnam he ordered the creation of the MACV Recondo School at Nha Trang in 1966. It consisted of Ranger-trained 5th Special Forces Group Green Beret instructors who trained American soldiers as well as members of other allied forces in the art of long-range reconnaissance patrolling techniques. Most students had attended a preparatory course at the divisional or separate brigade level before attending. Usually the course concerned endurance training and swimming lessons so the candidates could pass the physical requirements. It also winnowed out most of the candidates who did not have the physical, mental, and/or intellectual capabilities to complete the more advanced training. Units with good preparatory courses and candidate screening had higher rates of success than those who did not.

The course was three weeks in length with 260 hours of classroom and field instruction that required a high level of physical fitness, knowledge of patrolling techniques, first aid, land navigation, radio procedures, and weapons familiarity, and concluded with an actual combat patrol to demonstrate the students' skills. The first week was conducted on the school compound and consisted mostly of outdoor physical training and in-door classroom training. The second week was spent outside the compound on Hon Tre Island in the South China Sea practicing subjects, such as foreign weapons familiarity, tower and helicopter rappelling, ambush and escape-and-evasion techniques, and other field activities. The third week was spent in preparing and conducting an actual instructor-led combat patrol in the mountainous jungle between the massive naval air bases at Nha Trang and Cam Ranh Bay where the enemy often took position to mortar each base. During this patrol each team member switched positions to learn all responsibilities and were graded by the instructor. Graduates of this school received the MACV Recondo patch and identification number.

Graduating students were given questionnaires to evaluate the program so that it could be improved. Later on the graduates were asked which skills and tactics were most useful and which were least utilized so the curriculum would reflect the needs of the teams. The MACV Recondo course had a failure rate of 50 percent. Recondo School graduated its last class in December 1970 and was disbanded in February 1971. Recondo School succeeded in graduating over 2,700 American and 333 allied troops who shared their knowledge with their respective LRRP/Ranger units, ensuring every LRRP unit in Vietnam spoke a common language of long-range patrolling.

=== Post Vietnam (1973–1979) ===
Several infantry divisions re-instituted Recondo Schools in the post-Vietnam era to better train more small unit combat arms leaders. Fort Carson, Colorado operated a Recondo school during the late 1960s and early 1970s. Unique from other Recondo courses, Fort Carson took advantage of the mountainous terrain in the area and incorporated mountaineering training. In 1973, Fort Carson closed the Recondo school, but retained the mountaineering cadre. The mountaineering course and cadre were reassigned to the 1/10th Infantry Regiment, 4th Infantry Division, as a nod to the 10th Mountain Division, which had been created during World War II (1943) and inactivated in 1958 (reactivated later in 1985). The 1/10th Infantry Mountaineering Course was four weeks in duration and was conducted off-post in Cheyenne Canyon. Instruction included knot tying and rope management, balance climbing, roped climbing, rope bridges, rope traverses, and rappelling. Most students were able to attain a climbing level of 5.4 or better by the end of the course.

The 9th Infantry Division ran a Recondo School from 1975 to 1978 which was 21 days long and included 272 hours of intense training. Originally the Recondo School was reserved for soldiers from the 1st Brigade of the 9th Infantry Division which was also known as the Recondo Brigade. However, according to MG Volney F. Warner, the 2nd and 3rd Brigade commanders were constantly complaining because their NCO's would reenlist for the 1st Brigade and not for their present unit. MG Warner finally relented and made the Recondo School open to all soldiers on Fort Lewis. The training camp was located in a series of old railway cars which doubled as barracks for the students in a remote field location. The cadre were mainly composed of former senior members of the 2d Battalion (Ranger), 75th Infantry, a separate unit also located at Fort Lewis. The program of instruction included intense training in patrolling, ambushes, small unit tactics, first aid, rappelling, night navigation, riverine operations, and survival. Constant mental pressure was applied to each student at all times including 'salting' the railway cars with CS riot control crystal which were a continual skin irritant to the students. Intense physical training was provided with log drills running up and down a very steep hill leading down to the Puget Sound, long-distance formation runs averaging 7 minute miles with full equipment and rifles and intense periods of physical exercises. Riverine and boat insertion tactics were taught and raft drills were conducted in the Puget Sound even in the middle of winter pushing the students to their absolute breaking point. The final survival phase consisted of the killing of rabbits and chickens and a small steer to psychologically prepare the students to survive under the most austere of conditions. The 9th Division Recondo School was unique in that it was open to both men and women assigned to the post. However, there were no female graduates during the course's period of operations and the course averaged about a 90 percent attrition rate with about 40% of the losses among those who initially attempted the arduous physical fitness and water survival pre-tests and another 50% loss among those who actually began the course. Most graduates ending up with a 20-pound weight loss. The final exercise normally included a platoon sized night raid on the old Fort Lewis Vietnam Village. Graduates were awarded an arrowhead shaped badge with the arched letters RECONDO on the top which was worn on the right pocket of the fatigue shirt or left pocket of the dress green uniform.

The modern U.S. Army's Long-range surveillance (LRS), Reconnaissance, surveillance, and target acquisition (RSTA), and Marine Corps Reconnaissance Battalions (Division Recon) and Force Reconnaissance (Force Recon) all derive some portion of their legacies from the Recondo program and utilize the name "Recondos" informally.

== See also ==
- List of established military terms
- Battle of Signal Hill (Vietnam)
- Commando
- Company E, 52nd Infantry (LRP)
- Long Range Reconnaissance Patrol
- Operation Delaware
- 75th Ranger Regiment
- United States Marine Corps Reconnaissance Battalions
- United States Army Rangers
- United States Army Reconnaissance and Surveillance Leaders Course
- United States Marine Corps Reconnaissance Selection and Indoctrination
- Reconnaissance, surveillance, and target acquisition
- Dismounted reconnaissance troop
