= Regional Force Surveillance Group =

Specialised infantry unit of the Australian Army Reserve

- Active: October 2018 – present
- Country: Australia
- Branch: Australian Army Reserve
- Type: Infantry
- Role: Surveillance
- Part of: 2nd Division
- Garrison/HQ: Larrakeyah Barracks, Darwin

The Regional Force Surveillance Group (RFSG) was formally established on 4 October 2018 to command the Australian Army Reserve's three Regional Force Surveillance Units and a training unit. The RFSG forms part of the 2nd Division.

The RFSG is tasked "to provide a littoral surveillance and reconnaissance capability in Australia's north and northwest in order to support whole-of-government efforts to maintain national sovereignty and border security". The three Regional Force Surveillance Units conduct operational patrols as part of Operation Resolute.

Upon formation, the Regional Force Surveillance Group comprised:

- Group Headquarters located at Larrakeyah Barracks in Darwin
- NORFORCE (responsible for the Northern Territory and Kimberley region of Western Australia)
- The Pilbara Regiment (responsible for the Pilbara region of Western Australia)
- 51st Battalion, Far North Queensland Regiment (responsible for North Queensland)
- Indigenous Development Wing

The Group headquarters provides a single formation headquarters to formalise command and control arrangements and knowledge sharing between the three units.

The Indigenous Development Wing is responsible for delivering key training programs to Indigenous Australian soldiers across the Army and running the Regional Force Surveillance Group Education and Development Course. It was also established on 4 October 2018.
