= Northern Command (Australia) =

Joint operational command of the Australian Defence Force

The Northern Command is a joint operational Australian Defence Force formation. Northern Command is responsible for the planning and conduct of operations to the north of Australia during peacetime and wartime. In addition, Northern Command manages the defence aspects of the multi-agency Maritime Border Command.

The command's surveillance units include the three army Regional Force Surveillance Units: Norforce, the Pilbara Regiment in Western Australia, and the 51st Battalion, Far North Queensland Regiment.

Northern Command's area of operations covers Queensland and the Northern Territory above 19 degrees south and the Kimberley and Pilbara Districts of Western Australia. Northern Command's headquarters are located at Larrakeyah Barracks in Darwin, Northern Territory.

== Roles and responsibilities ==
The Northern Command's roles and responsibilities include the following, as of 2003:

- the conduct of military surveillance and response operations
- direct, coordinate and support all Defence Aid to the Civil Community activities
- facilitate support to Defence Force Aid to the Civil Authority
- re-establish and maintain military operational links with military counterparts in Eastern Indonesia. [As of 2007 the nearest Indonesian TNI regional command was Kodam IX/Udayana.]
- act as the ADF single point of contact for, and coordinate ADF liaison with the NT Government
- coordinate ADF liaison with Commonwealth, State, Territory and Local Govt Agencies, NGOs, other agencies and organisations, and the community
- facilitate industry and commercial support to ADF operations and exercises.
