= Regional Force Surveillance Units =

Specialised infantry units of the Australian Army Reserve

The Regional Force Surveillance Units (RFSUs) are specialised infantry units of the Australian Army Reserve responsible for patrolling northern Australia. Collectively, the RFSUs form the Regional Force Surveillance Group that is commanded by a Colonel based in Darwin. The RFSUs conduct regular operational patrols during peacetime, and are composed primarily of Reservists who live within the area of operations. There are currently three battalion-sized RFSUs:

- North-West Mobile Force (NORFORCE) (responsible for the Northern Territory and Kimberley region of Western Australia)
- The Pilbara Regiment (responsible for the Pilbara region of Western Australia)
- 51st Battalion, Far North Queensland Regiment (responsible for North Queensland)

== Role ==
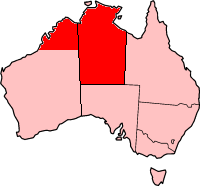
NORFORCE's area of operations

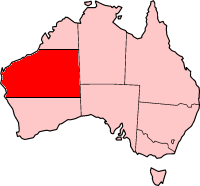
The Pilbara Regiment's area of operations

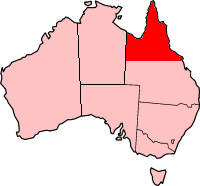
51 FNQR's area of operations

The RFSUs are units whose mission is to conduct long range reconnaissance and surveillance patrols in the sparsely populated and remote regions of northern Australia. Unlike most Australian Army units, the RFSUs are on a permanent operational footing, conducting real patrols with real world objectives during peacetime.

The primary reason for the RFSUs existence is national defence through remote surveillance, but the nature of their work means patrols can often provide valuable intelligence to civilian agencies such as Australian Customs, State and Federal police forces, and the intelligence community.

Prior to the existence of the RFSUs, surveillance in the remote north was carried out by the Special Air Service Regiment (SASR). The SASR's primary specialty as reconnaissance and surveillance soldiers made them ideally suited to the task. However, in the late 1970s and early 1980s, the SASR responded to the changing global security environment and identified counter-terrorism as the second area that they needed to specialise in. This, coupled with the possibility of overseas deployments, meant that the SASR would be hard pressed to maintain an effective domestic reconnaissance force whilst also fulfilling their other (new) roles.

The basic concept was to raise and train a reconnaissance and surveillance unit that would take over the SASR's tasks in northern Australia. Because the RFSUs receive SASR training support, the small unit tactics of the two units are similar and there are regular personnel exchanges - especially with regard to SASR personnel being posted to RFSU to keep the SASR 'up to speed' with the skills required to train indigenous peoples in guerilla warfare. However, the RFSU also are commanded and staffed by Royal Australian Regiment personnel. The command concepts, training continuum and even the capacity of the RFSU to focus on the generation of sustained and widespread operations in remote Australia differentiates the RFSU distinctly from the SASR.

Each patrolling task is different, and RFSU patrols tailor their plans to the task they have been assigned. Sometimes a patrol will infiltrate the area of operations by small boat at night, hide their boats, carry out their tasks and then exfiltrate the same way. At other times they may be airlifted in by chopper or small aircraft or perhaps a patrol will choose to drive in, hide their vehicles or just jump out the back of a moving vehicle and disappear into the bush. To be effective, RFSU patrols must remain completely undetected, so bushcraft skills, particularly camouflage and concealment, are very important to the RFSU patrolman.

In the event of a small or large scale insurgency in the north, the RFSUs role would be to detect enemy landings, especially near the important economic and defence infrastructure in their areas of operation. In the extremely unlikely event of an invasion of northern Australia the RFSUs would operate in a 'stay-behind' capacity. Patrols remaining in the field deep behind enemy lines would inevitably end up supplementing their diets from the land in order to survive and complete their mission as the first line of defence for continental Australia. Tasks for such a scenario are reporting on enemy movements, calling in airstrikes, killing and capturing the enemy in close quarter combat or sniping roles, demolition by explosive or sniping to impede enemy advance, and disrupting enemy supply lines for as long as possible.

== History ==
The genesis of the RFSU concept lies in the unit which was formed to patrol northern Australia during the Second World War. The 2/1st North Australia Observer Unit conducted horse and vehicle mounted patrols across northern Australia with the goal of observing and reporting on enemy movements on land, sea and in the air. These patrols were conducted in extremely harsh conditions, with little or no support or resupply - so this unit needed men who were very resourceful, independent, motivated and positive. Many of the soldiers from the NAOU later went on to join Z Special Unit and fought (and died) conducting commando operations against the Japanese in South East Asia. While the concept of the North Australia Observer Unit proved very successful, the Army's role in patrolling northern Australia ceased with the disbandment of 2/1 NAOU in 1945.

Following the Australian withdrawal from Vietnam the national defence strategy changed from forward defence through stationing military units in South East Asia to the defence of continental Australia. In line with this shift, the Australian military began to explore new ways of patrolling the Australian coastline. In the late 1970s the Special Air Service Regiment conducted a number of exercises in northern Western Australia which aimed to assess the ability of unconventional units to patrol the long and sparsely populated coastline of northern Australia. These trials indicated that recce patrols, operating in much the same way as an SAS patrol could provide a very useful capability.

Following this finding, it was decided in the early 1980s to establish three battalion-sized Regional Force Surveillance Units in northern Australia. These units would be composed of Army reservists who, it was hoped, would be able to use their local knowledge to enhance the effectiveness of the units' patrols. Each RFSU was formed by expanding and re-designating an independent rifle company:

- NORFORCE was raised from the 7th Independent Rifle Company on 1 July 1981
- The Pilbara Regiment was raised from the 5th Independent Rifle Company on 26 January 1985
- 51st Battalion, Far North Queensland Regiment was raised from the 51st Independent Rifle Company, The Royal Queensland Regiment on 1 October 1987

Since their establishment the RFSUs have proven highly successful and have made a significant contribution to the security of northern Australia. All three RFSUs contribute patrols to Operation Resolute, the Australian Defence Force's contribution to patrolling Australia's Exclusive Economic Zone and coastline.

The RFSUs were incorporated into the 6th Brigade on 1 March 2010 as part of its re-raising. On 1 September 2014, they were transferred to the 2nd Division. As of December 2014, the RFSUs had 200 Active and 1,350 Reserve personnel.

On 4 October 2018, all three RFSUs were grouped together as part of a new formation headquarters, the Regional Force Surveillance Group. The new formation came into being at a parade held at Larrakeyah Barracks in Darwin.

== Indigenous Australians and the RFSUs ==
Historically, the units draw on a long-time practice in Australia of using Aboriginal trackers. Indigenous skills of patrol, pathfinding and outback survival have a record in Australia assisting colonial and modern-day law enforcement and military operations.

As Army Reserve units, the make-up of the RFSUs' personnel reflects the ethnic make-up of their area of operations. As a result, a high proportion of the RFSUs' personnel are Indigenous Australians, making the Australian Army one of the largest single employers of Indigenous Australians. NORFORCE has the highest proportion of Indigenous soldiers, with 60% of the unit's personnel being Indigenous.

About 30% of 51 FNQR's personnel are Torres Strait Islanders or other Indigenous Australians. The Pilbara Regiment reportedly has relatively few Indigenous soldiers. The RFSUs are highly regarded by many Indigenous community leaders as the units provide employment and training opportunities to young Indigenous people living in remote communities.

== See also ==
- Northern Command (Australia)
- Canadian Rangers
