= 2/1st North Australia Observer Unit =

Australian Army reconnaissance unit

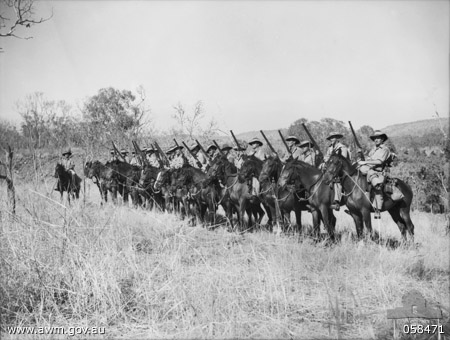
- Troopers of the North Australia Observer Unit during a morning parade in October 1943
- Active: 1942–45
- Country: Australia
- Branch: Army
- Type: Light horse
- Role: Reconnaissance
- Size: Peak strength of 550 personnel including 59 guides
- Garrison/HQ: Katherine
- Nickname: Nackeroos
- Equipment: Small arms, ships

Commanders
- Notable commanders: Lieutenant Colonel Bill Stanner

Insignia
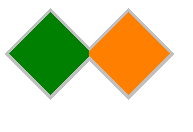
- Unit colour patch

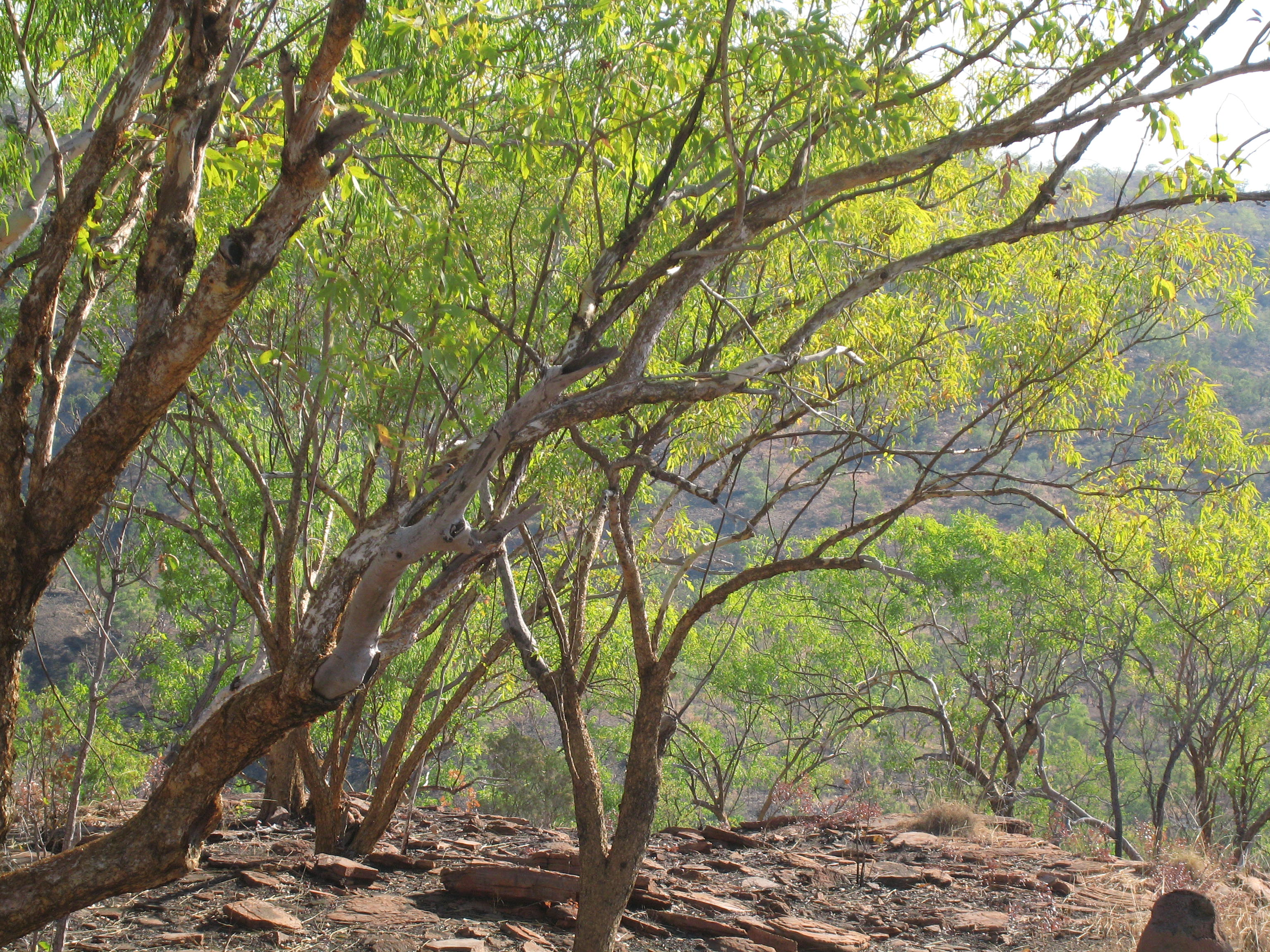
Nackeroos memorial lookout, near Timber Creek

The 2/1st North Australia Observer Unit (2/1 NAOU) was an Australian Army reconnaissance unit of World War II. Formed in early 1942 in the Northern Territory, the unit was a light horse mounted unit that was tasked with providing early warning of Japanese activity in northern Australia at a time when an invasion of the country was expected. As the threat of Japanese invasion dissipated the unit's operations were curtailed in 1943 and it was eventually disbanded in the early months of 1945. The unit is considered to be a predecessor of several reconnaissance units that currently exist within the Australian Army.

== History ==
Formed on 11 May 1942 under the command of Lieutenant Colonel Bill Stanner, the unit's headquarters was established in Katherine, Northern Territory. Nicknamed the Nackeroos or Curtin's Cowboys, the unit was raised at a time when the Japanese were steadily advancing in the Pacific. Broome had recently been bombed and an invasion of Australia was considered a possibility.

Concerned about the large unobserved sea and air approaches to northern Australia, specifically in the Kimberley region and in the Northern Territory, the Army tasked 2/1 NAOU with patrolling remote areas of northern Australia on horseback to provide early warning of Japanese activity to Northern Territory Force, which was tasked with defending the area in the event of an invasion. Other tasks included manning fixed coast watch stations and signals work. At the peak of its strength it numbered approximately 550 men, including 59 Aboriginal personnel who were employed as guides and labourers. As the threat of Japanese landings declined 2/1 NAOU patrols were reduced in July 1943 and the unit was disbanded in March 1945.

In 1972, Stanner summarised the unit in the following terms to Amoury Vane, the author of the unit's history:

The Unit was organised somewhat on the lines of a Light Horse regiment but with commando-type flexibility. It had a strategic and tactical role with duties of reconnaissance, scouting and coast-watching and was widely dispersed on and off the coasts and inland, between Cambridge Gulf and the Gulf of Carpentaria. The members of the Unit tended to operate in very small groups, often of section strength, over an enormous area, manning observation posts or in fixed or mounted roving patrols, so as to answer for the flanks of Northern Territory Force. They seldom assembled as troops, companies, or squadrons, and never, while I was in command, as a single Unit, after once taking up their field stations.

== Legacy ==
In 2007, the newly opened Nackeroo Airfield located in the Bradshaw Field Training Area was named after the unit's nickname. The modern Australian Army's Regional Force Surveillance Units have a similar role to 2/1 NAOU, with NORFORCE tracing its history back to 2/1 NAOU.

== See also ==
- Directorate of Research and Civil Affairs
