= Pilbara Regiment =

Australian Army Reserve unit

The Pilbara Regiment
- Cap badge of the Pilbara Regiment
- Active: 26 January 1982 – present
- Country: Australia
- Branch: Army
- Type: Line infantry
- Role: Regional force surveillance
- Size: One regiment
- Part of: Regional Force Surveillance Group
- Garrison/HQ: Karratha
- Motto(s): Mintu Wanta (Always Alert)
- March: Quick - Always Alert

Insignia
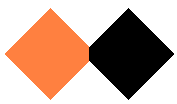
- Unit colour patch

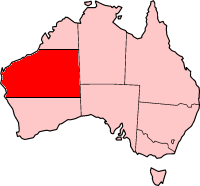
Area of Operations

The Pilbara Regiment is an infantry regiment of the Australian Army Reserve and is one of three Regional Force Surveillance Units employed in surveillance and reconnaissance of the remote areas of northern Australia. Most elements of the regiment are stationed in the Pilbara region of north-west Australia.

== History ==
In the late 1970s and early 1980s the need for a military presence in the north was recognised, with an integrated land, sea and air surveillance network developed in response. Part of this involved the raising of reserve infantry units that would act as "eyes and ears" in the north.

The Pilbara Regiment was raised for operations in the Pilbara region of north-west Australia, whilst others were raised in the Northern Territory and Far North Queensland. The regiment was originally formed as a company on 26 January 1982, as the 5th Independent Rifle Company, The Pilbara Regiment, under Major David Hudson. It was subsequently redesignated as a full regiment in 1985.

Today the regiment's mission is: "To provide the Australian Army with information by conducting surveillance operations to contribute to an effective Australian Defence Force surveillance network in the North West of Australia (Pilbara Region)". It is responsible for an area of 1.5 million square kilometres from Port Hedland to Geraldton in Western Australia, and from the coast to the border with the Northern Territory; being approximately one-sixth of the total Australia mass.

A detailed knowledge of its Area of Operations is maintained by conducting reconnaissance patrols by foot, vehicle and watercraft; surveillance from static observation posts; and by systematic communication and liaison with police, customs, other regional authorities, and with local landowners.

On 1 March 2010, Pilbara Regiment became part of the re-raised 6th Brigade.

On 4 October 2018, all three RFSUs were grouped together as part of a new formation headquarters, the Regional Force Surveillance Group. The new formation came into being at a parade held at Larrakeyah Barracks in Darwin.

== Current organisation ==
As at 2017, The Pilbara Regiment comprises three squadrons, a regimental headquarters and two support squadrons. The regiment's sub-units are:

- Regimental Headquarters
- 1 Squadron
- 2 Squadron
- 3 Squadron
- Training Support Squadron
- Operational Support Squadron

The Regimental Headquarters is located in the town of Karratha and most other elements of the regiment are spread across the Pilbara region. 3 Squadron is located in Perth.

== See also ==
- NORFORCE
- Far North Queensland Regiment
- Northern Command (Australia)
- Australian Army
- Australian Defence Force
