= 51st Battalion, Far North Queensland Regiment =

Australian Army unit

- Cap badge of the Far North Queensland Regiment
- Active: 1916–1919; 1921–1930; 1936–1943; 1950–1960; 1965–1976; 1985–present
- Country: Australia
- Branch: Army Reserve
- Role: Regional force surveillance
- Size: One battalion
- Part of: Regional Force Surveillance Group
- Garrison/HQ: Cairns
- Nicknames: The Eyes and Ears of the North
- Motto: Ducit Amor Patriae (love of country Leads Me) (Latin)
- March: Quick – The Far North Queensland Regiment (Band); The Black Kookaburra (Pipes and Drums); Slow – Soldiers of the North

Commanders
- Honorary Colonel: Colonel K. Ryan

Insignia
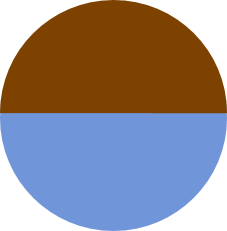
- Unit colour patch
- Abbreviation: 51 FNQR

The 51st Battalion, Far North Queensland Regiment (51 FNQR) is an Australian Army Reserve Regional Force Surveillance Unit headquartered at Porton Barracks in Cairns, Queensland. The battalion's primary role is to conduct reconnaissance and surveillance tasks in support of border security operations. Its area of operations includes the Torres Strait (especially Australia's border with Papua New Guinea) and the Cape York littoral environment. Additional tasks for 51FNQR include the collection and collation of military geographic information as well as community engagement and disaster relief operations.

Soldiers in the unit are cross-trained in a variety of "low-visibility" skills such as weapons, survival, sniping, medical, small boat handling, driving, tracking, air operations. It is the only battalion of the Far North Queensland Regiment, and draws its lineage from an Australian Imperial Force (AIF) light infantry battalion, which was raised for service during World War I.

== History ==
=== World War I ===
The 51st Battalion was originally raised in Egypt in early 1916 as part of the reorganisation and expansion of the AIF following the Gallipoli campaign. This was achieved by transferring cadres of experienced personnel predominately from units of the 1st Division to the newly formed battalions and combining them with recently recruited personnel who had been dispatched as reinforcements from Australia. The unit's first intake of personnel were drawn from men originating from Western Australia, many of whom had already served with the 11th Battalion during the fighting in Turkey. As a result, at the time of its formation, it inherited the battle honour awarded to the mounted infantry from Western Australia who served during the Second Boer War.

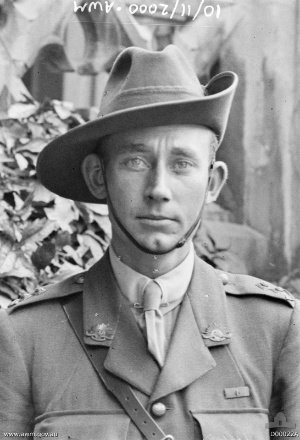
Lieutenant Clifford Sadlier, who received the Victoria Cross for his actions around Villers-Bretonneux in April 1918

Under the command of Lieutenant Colonel Arthur Murray Ross, a regular British Army officer, the battalion—as part of the 13th Brigade attached to the 4th Australian Division—sailed for France, arriving in Marseille on 12 June 1916. Shortly afterwards it was committed to the fighting, taking part in the Battle of Mouquet Farm during August and September. In three weeks, the battalion lost 650 men killed or wounded.

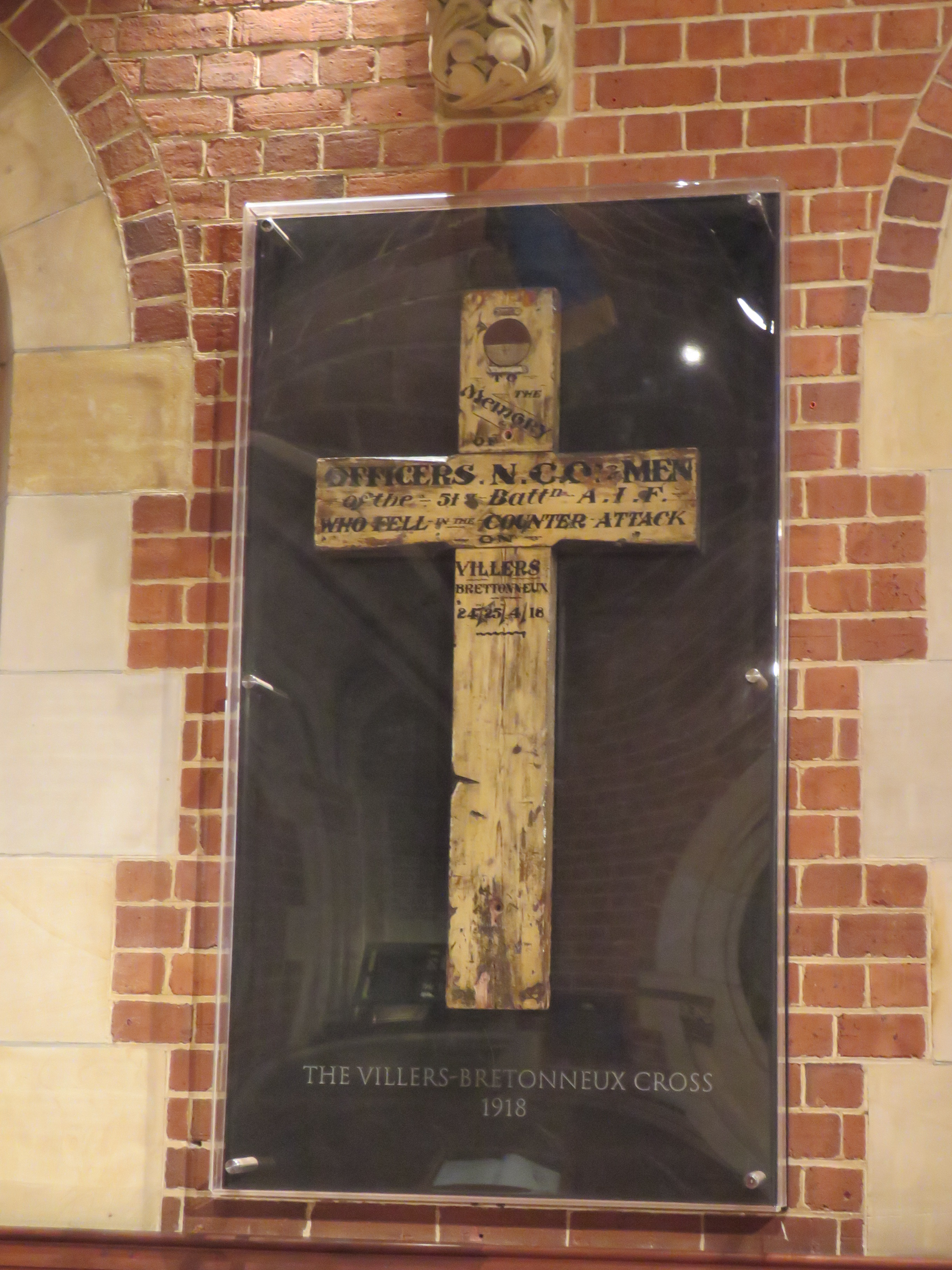
The Villers-Bretonneux Cross, originally erected at the spot near to where a large number of members of the battalion lost their lives, now on display at the Soldier's Chapel, St George's Cathedral, Perth

Following this, it moved to Belgium where it saw service on the Hindenburg Line, participating in the battles at Messines and Polygon Wood in 1917. In early 1918, it assisted in the repulse of the major German offensive on the Western Front following the collapse of Russia. On the morning of 24/25 April 1918—Anzac Day—the battalion took part in an Allied counter-attack at Villers-Bretonneux, in France, where they suffered 389 casualties in two days of fighting. Following this, the 51st Battalion took part in the last major Allied offensive of the war—the Hundred Days Offensive—between August and September 1918. After that the battalion, along with the rest of the Australian Corps, was removed from the line having been severely depleted and suffering manpower shortages and it was out of the line training when the Armistice was declared on 11 November 1918, effectively bring an end to the war.

After the end of the war, as the demobilisation process took place the 51st Battalion was amalgamated first with the 50th Battalion and then also with the 49th, before being disbanded on 5 May 1919. During the fighting, it suffered lost 34 officers and 851 other ranks killed in action or died on active service (Note: This includes killed in action, died of wounds, disease, gas or other causes.) and 50 officers and 1,643 other ranks wounded or captured. (Note: This includes wounded in action, gassed or prisoners of war.)

Members of the battalion received the following decorations: one Victoria Cross (VC), one Distinguished Service Order (DSO) with one Bar, one Officer of the Order of the British Empire (OBE), 16 Military Crosses (MCs) with two Bars, 16 Distinguished Conduct Medals (DCMs), 122 Military Medals (MMs) with five Bars, eight Meritorious Service Medals (MSMs), 25 Mentions in Despatches (MIDs) and eight foreign awards. (Note: Browning states that there were actually nine foreign awards, detailing them as follows: three Croix de Guerre (Belgium), three Croix de Guerre (France), one Order of the Crown of Rumania, one Medal of St George 4th Class (Russia) and one Serbian Order of the White Eagle 5th Class (with Swords). See Appendix D.) The battalion's sole VC recipient was Lieutenant Clifford Sadlier, who received the award for his actions during the attack on Villers-Bretonneux on 24/25 April 1918.

=== Inter war years ===
In 1921, Australia's part-time military force was reorganised. Where possible an effort was made to raise battalions in the locations from where they had drawn the majority of their personnel during the war. As a result, the battalion was reformed at this time at Subiaco in Western Australia, however, the following year it was moved to Launceston, Tasmania, and then to Sydney, in 1924, where it was attached to the 8th Brigade, which was part of the 1st Division. In 1927, the battalion was regimented as 51st Battalion, Field of Mars Regiment. During its period in New South Wales, as a result of austerity measures imposed upon the military due to the economic hardships of the Great Depression and the lack of manpower that resulted from the end to compulsory service, the battalion was twice amalgamated, firstly with the 30th Battalion in 1930, then with the 18th Battalion on 1 July 1935. In 1936, the two battalions were unlinked and on 1 October, the 51st Battalion, Far North Queensland Regiment was re-raised at Cairns, Queensland, taking on the lineage from the original 51st Battalion. At this time Major (later Lieutenant Colonel) Hubert Harris was appointed commanding officer of the battalion.

=== World War II ===
The battalion was a Militia unit at the outbreak of World War II, attached to the 11th Brigade. After the government decided to raise a separate force, the Second Australian Imperial Force (2nd AIF), for service overseas due to the provisions of the Defence Act (1903) which precluded sending the Militia overseas to fight, many members of the Militia volunteered for service with the 2nd AIF. As a result, the 51st Battalion's numbers fell, however, in 1940 the national service scheme was reintroduced in effort to improve the nation's overall level of military preparedness and the battalion, its numbers swelled by an intake of conscripted soldiers, undertook a period of continuous training at Miowera, near Bowen.

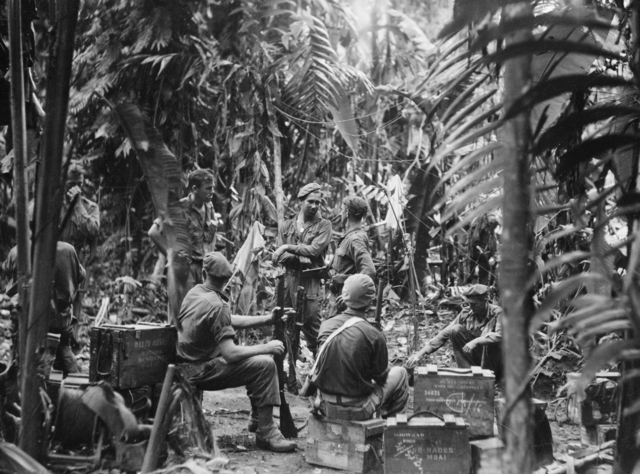
Members of the 31st/51st Battalion around Porton Plantation, June 1945

In 1941, following Japan's entrance into the war, the battalion was mobilised for war and placed on full-time duty with the task of defending the area between Port Douglas and Gordonvale. Later they were sent to Townsville, where they experienced Japanese air raids, before being sent to Cairns as preparations were made to deploy the battalion overseas. In 1943, however, a manpower shortage had developed within the Australian economy as a result of an overmobilisation of the military. Subsequently, the government released a large number of rural workers from their full-time military commitment and decided to disband or amalgamate a number of Militia units. As a result, the 51st Battalion was forced to amalgamate with the 31st Battalion, Kennedy Regiment on 12 April 1943.

The new 31st/51st Battalion was deployed to New Guinea with the 11th Brigade, where it formed part of Merauke Force and was subsequently designated as an AIF battalion in 1944. (Note: Under the terms of the Defence Act (1903) there were limitations placed on where units of the Militia were allowed to be deployed. However, changes to the law were made during the war under the Defence (Citizen Military Forces) Act 1943 which allowed for the transfer of Militia units to the AIF if sixty-five percent or more of their personnel had volunteered for overseas service.) Following this, and a return to Australia, the battalion was then deployed to the Solomon Islands, where it saw its heaviest fighting of the war at Tsimba Ridge and Porton Plantation, on Bougainville. The battalion was finally disbanded on 4 July 1946. During the course of the war, the 31st/51st Battalion lost 61 men killed in action or died on active service, while a further 168 men were wounded. Members of the battalion received the following decorations: one DSO, one DCM, three MCs, 10 MMs, one British Empire Medal (BEM) and 27 MIDs.

=== Post war ===
The 51st Battalion, FNQR was raised again in 1950, this time being presented with colours containing the battle honours of its predecessor units. In 1960, following a reorganisation of the Army along Pentropic lines, the regiment was amalgamated yet again, with the 31st Battalion, Kennedy Regiment, and the 42nd Battalion, Capricornia Regiment, to become the 2nd Battalion, Royal Queensland Regiment. This lasted five years, until the Citizens Military Force was reorganised again—the 2nd Battalion was split into its components, with the 51st becoming 51st Battalion, Royal Queensland Regiment. A further reorganisation saw the number of battalions reduced; this led to the 51st becoming a single company known as the 51st Independent Rifle Company, Royal Queensland Regiment, in 1976.

=== RFSU ===
In the late 1970s, the Australian government decided that an increased military presence was needed in the far north of the country to provide early warning in the event of incursions in to Australian territory. To achieve this, three Regional Force Surveillance Units (RFSUs) were established to carry out ground reconnaissance and surveillance. The first two units, the North-West Mobile Force and the Pilbara Regiment, were raised for service in Western Australia and the Northern Territory in 1981–1982. To extend this to the northern regions of Queensland, it was decided to reform the 51st Battalion. In 1985, the 51st Independent Rifle Company was removed from the order of battle of the Royal Queensland Regiment to become the 51st Battalion, Far North Queensland Regiment once again. The inaugural commanding officer was Lieutenant Colonel (Kel)vin Ryan.

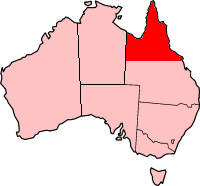
Area of Operations

The current mission of the 51st Battalion, FNQR is that of an RFSU, with the unit tasked with conducting land based and littoral surveillance and reconnaissance in support of national security operations in the inhospitable areas along the northern coast of Australia. As the regiment's name suggests, it is responsible for patrolling the north of Queensland, with its Area of Responsibility covering from Cardwell in north Queensland, north to the Torres Strait, including Cape York and the Gulf Country and west to the Northern Territory border; in total some 640,000 square kilometres (250,000 sq mi).

On 1 March 2010, 51FNQR became part of the re-raised 6th Brigade. It is currently composed of reservists supported by a cadre of regular personnel. A high proportion of the regiment's personnel are Indigenous Australians. On 4 October 2018, all three RFSUs were grouped together as part of a new formation headquarters, the Regional Force Surveillance Group. The new formation came into being at a parade held at Larrakeyah Barracks in Darwin.

== Battle honours ==
- South Africa 1899–1902;
- World War I: France and Flanders 1916–18, Egypt 1916, Somme 1916–18, Pozières, Bullecourt, Messines 1917, Menin Road, Polygon Wood, Passchendaele, Ancre 1918, Villers-Bretonneux, Hamel, Amiens, Albert 1918, Hindenburg Line, Épehy;
- World War II: Liberation of Australian New Guinea, Tsimba Ridge, Bonis–Porton, South West Pacific 1943–45.

== Commanding officers ==
The following officers commanded the 51st Battalion during the World Wars:

- World War I:
  - Lieutenant Colonel Arthur Ross;
  - Lieutenant Colonel John Ridley;
  - Lieutenant Colonel Robert Christie. (Note: Christie later joined the Royal Australian Air Force and reached the rank of air commodore.)
- World War II:
  - Lieutenant Colonel Hubert Harris;
  - Lieutenant Colonel Oscar Issachsen;
  - Lieutenant Colonel Phillip Cardale;
  - Lieutenant Colonel Geoffrey Brock.

== See also ==
- Northern Command (Australia)

== Notes ==
Footnotes

Citations
