= NORFORCE =

Infantry regiment of the Australian Army Reserve

North-West Mobile Force
- Cap badge of the North-West Mobile Force
- Active: 1 July 1981 – present
- Country: Australia
- Branch: Army
- Role: Regional force surveillance
- Size: One battalion
- Part of: Regional Force Surveillance Group
- Garrison/HQ: Larrakeyah
- Nicknames: Nackaroos; Green skins
- Motto: Ever Vigilant
- Colors: Green and Ochre
- March: Quick – The Vedette; Slow – The Never-Never

Commanders
- CO: LTCOL Wood
- RSM: WO1 Hainnan

Insignia
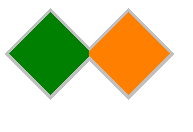
- Unit colour patch
- Abbreviation: NORFORCE

The NORFORCE (North-West Mobile Force) is an infantry regiment of the Australian Army Reserve. Formed in 1981, the regiment is one of three Regional Force Surveillance Units (RFSUs) employed in surveillance and reconnaissance of the remote areas of Northern Australia. It consists of a regimental headquarters, four surveillance squadrons, and an operational support squadron and training squadron.

== History ==
In the late 1970s and early 1980s the need for a military presence in the north of Australia was recognised, with an integrated land, sea and air surveillance network developed in response. Part of this involved the raising of Australian Army Reserve infantry units known as Regional Force Surveillance Units (RFSUs) that would act as "eyes and ears" in the north. NORFORCE was raised for operations in the Northern Territory and the Kimberley region of Northern Australia and was formed as an independent company on 1 July 1981, from the 7th Independent Rifle Company, and was based in Darwin under the command of Lieutenant Colonel John George. This unit was renamed as the North-West Mobile Force, or NORFORCE, in 1981. Meanwhile, in 1985 two more RFSUs were raised, with the Pilbara Regiment established in Western Australia, and the 51st Battalion, Far North Queensland Regiment established in Far North Queensland.

The regiment's lineage goes back to 2/1st North Australia Observer Unit (2/1 NAOU) (also known as the "Nackaroos"), which were formed in 1942 as part of the defence of northern Australia from the Japanese during the Second World War, performing reconnaissance, scouting and coastal surveillance tasks across the Kimberley and the Northern Territory's sea and air approaches. Patrols were reduced in July 1943 as the Japanese threat subsided, and the unit was disbanded in 1945. Due to the similarities between the two units and in order to give NORFORCE an identity it was decided that it would perpetuate the 2/1 NAOU traditions, and as such NORFORCE officially adopted the 2/1 NAOU's orange and green 'double diamond' colour patch and its unit heritage upon formation.

NORFORCE also shares its heritage with a number of other units raised during the Second World War, including the Darwin Mobile Force, from which NORFORCE derives its name, and the Northern Territory Special Reconnaissance Unit which performed a similar role to the 2/1 NAOU and pioneered the enlistment and training of regionally based Australian soldiers, mainly from Arnhem Land. The Darwin Mobile Force was raised in 1939, originally as an artillery unit due to restrictions of the Defence Act (1903) which prohibited the establishment of permanent infantry forces, and was the first Permanent Military Force unit to be raised in the Army. The unit was tasked with the surveillance and protection of the Darwin region. It was renamed the Darwin Infantry Battalion in 1942 and the 19th Battalion in 1943, and subsequently saw service during the New Guinea campaign.

During its formative years between 1981 and 1985 the regiment consisted of two reconnaissance squadrons, with the 1st Reconnaissance Squadron responsible for the Northern Territory and the 2nd Reconnaissance Squadron responsible for the Kimberley region in Western Australia. In early 1986 the alpha-numeric designations gave way to geographic names, with 1 Squadron being re-designated Darwin Squadron and 2 Squadron becoming Kimberley Squadron. Further growth of the unit saw Centre Squadron and Arnhem Squadron also being raised in 1986. Each of the regional reconnaissance squadrons has its own Area of Responsibility, and is further divided into a number of "troops", each of which consists of a number of "patrols".

Darwin Squadron is based at Larrakeyah Barracks in Darwin and has maintained a presence in Daly River, Jabiru, Katherine, Maningrida and Port Keats/Wadeye, and on Bathurst, Crocker, Goulburn and Melville islands. Kimberley Squadron is headquartered in Broome, with elements based in Lake Argyle, Derby, Kalumburu, Kununurra, Bidyadanga and Wyndham. Arnhem Squadron is responsible for the eastern Northern Territory with its headquarters in Nhulunbuy, and elements at Lake Evella, Milingimbi, Ngukurr, Numbulwar and Ramingining, and on Elcho Island and Groote Eylandt. Centre Squadron operates from the South Australian border northwards, including the main regional centres of Alice Springs and Tennant Creek, the sparse Barkly Tableland, and north to the Robinson River and Borroloola.

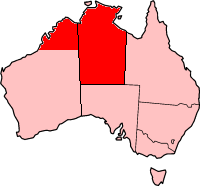
NORFORCE Area of Operations

The regiment is now a fully integrated unit consisting of a cadre of about 65 regular personnel supporting 435 Reservists. Regimental Headquarters is at Larrakeyah Barracks in Darwin, while its area of operation (AO) covers 1.8 million square kilometres, encompassing the entire Northern Territory and the Kimberley region of Western Australia; the largest of any military unit in the world today. An Operational Support Squadron and Training Squadron are also based in Darwin.

Borrowing the concept of different "skin" groups to differentiate clans, members of NORFORCE are also known as "Green skins". The primary role of the regiment is reconnaissance, observation and the collection of military intelligence. In the event of an invasion of northern Australia, NORFORCE and the other RFSUs would operate in a "stay-behind" capacity. Sixty percent of NORFORCE personnel are Aboriginal soldiers, recruited mainly from the area they patrol in order to draw upon local knowledge. This has resulted in great trust for the Regiment among Aboriginal communities.

Patrols can be inserted and extracted from the area of operations by small boat, airlifted by helicopter or light aircraft, drive in using a range of vehicles, or on foot. Due to their operational role the RFSUs have a high priority for allocation of equipment. Equipment includes Enhanced F88 (EF88) Austeyr rifles, F-89 Minimi light support weapons, grenades, M18-A1 Claymore anti-personnel mines, Harris radios, specialised binoculars and telescopes, night vision equipment, cameras and advanced GPS satellite navigation systems. Vehicles include a variant of the Mercedes-Benz G-Wagon 6×6 Surveillance Reconnaissance Vehicles (SRV), motorcycles, Zodiac inflatable boats, and Regional Patrol Craft (aluminium boats).

NORFORCE has the distinction of being granted the Freedom of Entry to a city or town on ten occasions, the most of any unit, ship or establishment in the Australian Defence Force. Freedoms of Entry have been granted for Darwin in 1982, Derby in 1983, Alice Springs in 1984, Katherine in 1986, Wyndham in 1986, Broome in 1987, Kununurra in 1990, Tennant Creek in 1994, Darwin again in 2016 and most recently Alice Springs again in 2023. In 2006, the regiment celebrated its 25th birthday by being presented with its first stand of colours.

=== Operation Resolute ===
NORFORCE has continuously contributed Force Elements to Operation Resolute as part of the wider Whole of Government response to border protection. As one of three RFSUs involved, NORFORCE routinely trains and certifies personnel for the Australian Defence Force's contribution to patrolling Australia's Exclusive Economic Zone and coastline. On 1 March 2010, NORFORCE became part of the re-raised 6th Brigade.

On 1 September 2014, NORFORCE came under the command of the 2nd Division. On 4 October 2018, all three RFSUs were grouped together as part of a new formation headquarters, the Regional Force Surveillance Group. The new formation came into being at a parade held at Larrakeyah Barracks in Darwin.

== Current organisation ==
As of 2021, NORFORCE comprised:

- Regimental Headquarters – Larrakeyah Barracks, Darwin, NT
  - Arnhem Squadron – Nhulunbuy, NT
  - Centre Squadron – Alice Springs, NT
  - Darwin Squadron – Larrakeyah Barracks, Darwin, NT
  - Kimberley Squadron – Broome, WA
  - Training Support Squadron – Larrakeyah Barracks, Darwin, NT
  - Operational Support Squadron – Larrakeyah Barracks, Darwin, NT

== Freedoms of Entry ==
NORFORCE has the distinction of being granted the Freedom of Entry to a city or town on ten occasions, the most of any unit, ship or establishment in the Australian Defence Force.

- Alice Springs: 1984 and 2023
- Broome: 1987
- Darwin: 1982 and 2016
- Derby: 1983
- Katherine: 1986
- Kununurra: 1990
- Tennant Creek: 1994
- Wyndham: 1986

In 2006, the regiment celebrated its 25th birthday by being presented with its first stand of colours.

== See also ==
- Northern Command (Australia)
