= Nackeroo Airfield =

Military airfield in the Northern Territory, Australia

- Part of Bradshaw Field Training Area
- Bradshaw Station, Northern Territory in Australia
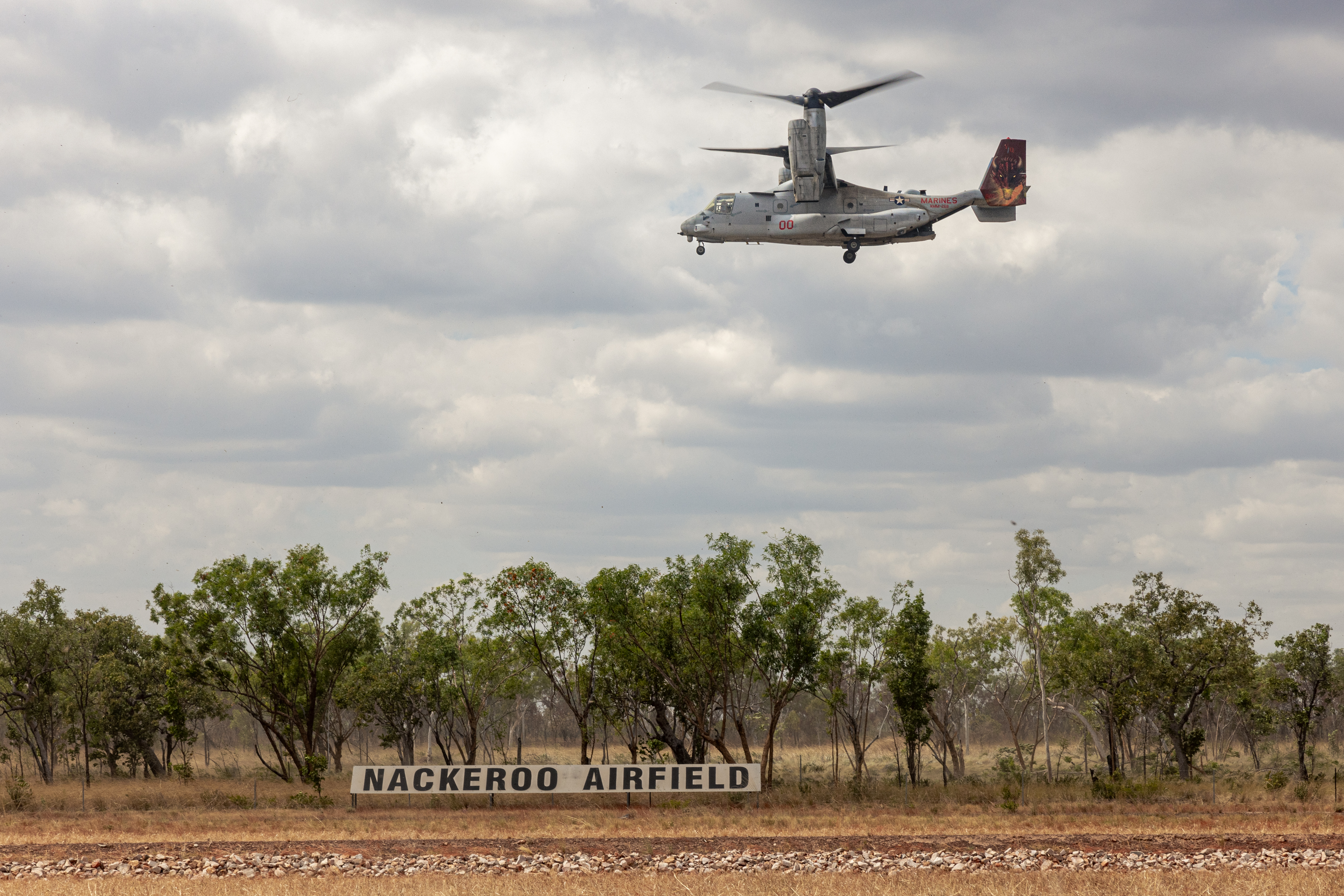
- Marine Rotational Force – Darwin 24.3 take off in an MV-22B Osprey from the Nackeroo Airfield opening ceremony at Nackeroo Airfield, 30 May, 2024.

Site information
- Owner: Australian Army
- Operator: Range Control, Bradshaw Field Training Area

Location
- Shown within Australia Nackeroo Airfield (Northern Territory)
- Coordinates: 15°34′38″S 130°28′32″E
- Area: 34.5 hectares

Site history
- Built: 2007
- Built for: Joint-military exercises
- In use: 2007–present

Airfield information
- Identifiers: ICAO: YNKR
- Elevation: 133.8 metres (439 ft) AMSL
Runways
Direction	Length and surface
14/32	1,700 metres (5,577 ft) Asphalt

Nackeroo Airfield (ICAO: YNKR) is a military training airfield located within the Bradshaw Field Training Area in the Northern Territory of Australia. It was established in 2007 after 16 days of construction, and provided training operations during joint exercises. In 2024, Nackeroo Airfield was further improved with the installation of a paved runway and apron, increasing operational capacity and capabilities.

== History ==
=== Construction ===
In early June of 2007, construction of an unpaved airstrip began as part of the Joint Rapid Airfield Construction Project. It was located in the Bradshaw Field Training Area in the Northern Territory. Clearing and grubbing of the site began on 2 June, 2007. On 16 June, 2007, the last of the screened material was placed and compacted. The construction of the airstrip was undertaken by a combined team of Australian Defence Force and U.S. military engineers, including personnel from the Australian Army and Royal Australian Air Force (RAAF), and personnel from the United States Navy and United States Marine Corps. Work was carried out by 110 Australian personnel and 105 U.S. personnel. After 16 days, a dirt surface runway measuring 1,200 meters long and 45 meters wide was completed on 18 June, 2007, and two turning aprons were completed a day later, only taking 3 days to complete. The airfield was named after the 2/1st North Australia Observer Unit, which was established in Katherine, Northern Territory and gained the nickname "Nackeroos". Nackeroo Airfield was certified for operations by a USAF certification team from the 310th Special Tactical Squadron on 23 June, 2007. In the same day, a RAAF Lockheed C-130 Hercules became the first aircraft to land on the newly completed airstrip. Following the certification, tests involving runway geometry and pavement strength were conducted using field testing and surveying instruments. On 28 June, 2007, Nackeroo Airfield was approved for use by the Boeing C-17 Globemaster III. On 29 June, 2007, Nackeroo Airfield was officially opened, coinciding with Exercise Talisman Sabre 2007 where Australian and U.S. C-17 aircraft demonstrated the runway capability.

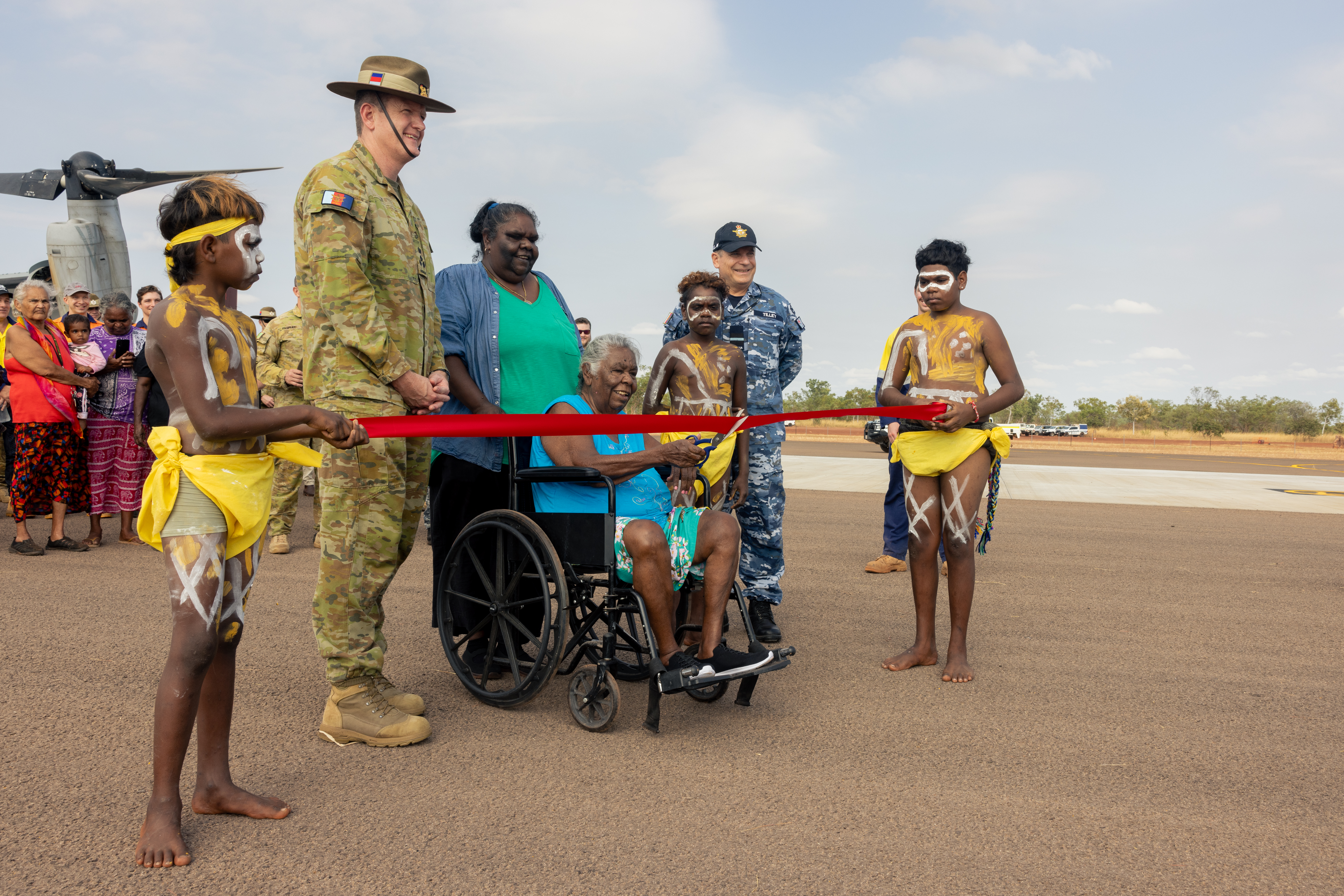
An Australian Traditional Owner cuts a ribbon as a part during the opening ceremony on May 30, 2024.

=== Operations ===
In August 2021, Marine Rotational Force – Darwin conducted a HIMARS Rapid Infiltration mission, which involved the seizure of Nackeroo Airfield and landing a C-17 at the airstrip as part of training drill during Exercise Loobye.

In June 2024, construction of a paved runway and apron began, undertaken by Mitcon Projects as part of the 2024 National Defence Strategy. Over 15,000m2 of concrete and over 5,000m2 of heat-resistant hardstands were installed, with the budget amounting to 21 million Australian dollars. Up to 25,000 dowels and 6,000lm of saw cuts were also installed and completed. On 31 May, 2024, the runway upgrades were completed. On 4 June, 2024, a public commemoration with Traditional Owners and Defence personnel was held, marking the official opening of the airfield. Additional load-bearing and aircraft pavements works continued until February 2025, which also marked the 10 year anniversary of Mitcon Projects' operations in the Northern Territory. The new runway and apron increased the capacity of aircraft parking, allowing aircraft such as the C-17A Globemaster III and Bell Boeing V-22 Osprey to operate from Nackeroo Airfield.

== Facilities ==
Nackeroo Airfield is currently operated by Range Control Bradshaw Field Training Area. The airfield initially had a dirt runway measuring 1,200 meters long and 45 meters wide. It currently operates a single asphalt runway orientated northwest to southeast and numbered 14/32. Surface movement guidance includes 8 bi-directional visual landing zone markers marking the runway, and there are only runway outline markings. There is an apron located west of the runway, and is connected via two taxiways designated A and B. The apron has two combined segments, one concrete side with two C-17 parking and one asphalt side with four MV-22 Osprey parking, which is also equipped with heat-resistant concrete strips.
