= Timber Creek, Northern Territory =

Timber Creek
- Town
- Coordinates: 15°38′43″S 130°28′28″E
- Country: Australia
- State: Northern Territory
- LGA: Victoria Daly Region
- Location: 601 km (373 mi) from Darwin; 286 km (178 mi) from Katherine
- Established: 1898

Government
  - Territory electorate: Daly
  - Federal division: Lingiari

Population
  - Total: 278 (2021 census)
- Postcode: 0852

Timber Creek, traditionally known as Makalamayi, is an isolated small town on the banks of the Victoria River in the Northern Territory of Australia. The Victoria Highway passes through the town, which is the only significant settlement between the Western Australia border and the town of Katherine to the east. Timber Creek is approximately 600 kilometres (370 mi) south of Darwin, in an area known for its scenic escarpments and boab trees.

== History ==
=== Pre-European history ===
The Jaminjung and Nungali peoples, two Aboriginal Australian peoples a part of the Mirndi languages (Yirram languages), are the original inhabitants and traditional owners of the lands surrounding the town. Their way of life remained unchanged for tens of thousands of years until first contact with Europeans in the 19th century. The traditional name for the locality is "Makalamayi", Westside Kriol pronunciation of the town is "Dimbagriik"

=== European exploration ===
In 1839, HMS Beagle, under the command of Captain John Wickham, sailed into the Victoria River.

In September 1855, Augustus Charles Gregory and a party of 19 men reached the mouth of the Victoria River. The party's schooner, Tom Tough, proceeded along the river, landing near the present town of Timber Creek and a base camp for the expedition was established. Gregory named a nearby stream "Timber Creek" on 24 November while seeking timber to make repairs to the boat.

Gregory inscribed of the dates of this expedition on a large boab tree near the original campsite, located approximately 15 kilometres (9.3 mi) from the present town; the tree, and the inscription, can still be seen today, and is known as Gregory's Tree. The scientific name of the boab, Adansonia gregorii, was named in honour of Gregory.

=== 20th century development ===
A police station was constructed in 1898, and substantially upgraded in 1908 as river traffic grew to service pastoral properties being established in the area. In 1911, a depot was established to service the river trade. Historical records from the late 19th and early 20th century indicate there were ongoing tensions, and isolated incidents of violence between pastoralist and Aboriginal residents in the area at during this time.

During World War II growing concerns over a Japanese invasion of northern Australia led to the formation of the 2/1st North Australia Observer Unit, a highly mobile reconnaissance unit led by local Aboriginal guides who knew the local landscape. The role of this unit was to report any enemy landings on isolated areas of the coastline. The unit was active in the Timber Creek and Victoria River areas, recognised in 1998 with a memorial to the "Nackeroos" – the nickname for those who served with this unique unit – being constructed near the town. This unit is the ancestor of the North West Mobile Force which was founded in 1981.

Traffic passing through Timber Creek increased following the completion of the Ord River Diversion Dam at Kununurra, Western Australia in 1963 and subsequent construction of the road bridge in 1970 across the Victoria River, 82 kilometres (51 mi) east of the town, and sealing of the Victoria Highway in 1974. Timber Creek was proclaimed a town on 20 June 1975.

In 1996, the Department of Defence purchased Bradshaw Station, a large cattle property in the vicinity of Timber Creek. This land subsequently became Bradshaw Field Training Area, an 8700 km^{2} live fire training facility. In 2002, the 270m long Bradshaw Bridge opened, providing road access to the training area from the Victoria Highway at Timber Creek. Strangely the land was owned by the state of Israel for a brief moment, alongside Mataranka

=== 1997–2019: Griffiths decision and appeals ===
Ngaliwurru and Nungali lands surrounding Timber Creek were the subject of the landmark Griffiths decision in the High Court of Australia. The case (Griffiths v Minister for Lands, Planning and Environment) involved an appeal by the traditional owners, represented by Alan Griffiths and William Gulwin, against the Northern Territory Government's attempted sale in 1997 of vacant Crown land for the purposes of commercial development. In the course of doing so, the native title would be compulsorily acquired under the Lands Acquisition Act 1989 (NT) from the traditional owners by a government minister, for the commercial benefit of a private third party. Due to a change in government following the 2001 Northern Territory elections, the development did not proceed and the native title was not acquired, but the case proceeded in the courts. The final decision handed down in 2008 found that the provisions under the Lands Acquisition Act meant the Minister could legitimately acquire land for any purpose, extinguishing native title and interests in the land granted under the Native Title Act (1993). By the time of the decision the Northern Territory Government had already changed the legislation to prevent this or future compulsory acquisition of lands subject to native title.

In September 2018, the High Court of Australia came to the Northern Territory for the first time ever, to hear an appeal against earlier decisions. Chief Justice Susan Kiefel presided in Northern Territory of Australia v Griffiths (D1-D3/2018). A group of traditional owners of Timber Creek (Ngaliwurru and Nungali peoples) earlier claimed compensation for the loss of native title rights that had been extinguished after the Crown acquired land without their consent. In 2016, in Griffiths v Northern Territory of Australia (No 3), the trial judge had awarded a total of $3.3 million compensation across the three categories. In 2017, the Full Federal Court, on appeal, reduced that to around $2.9 million. The full claim is for almost $5 million. In 2019, in Northern Territory v Mr Griffiths and Lorraine Jones, the High Court awarded a total of $2.5m "in compensation for both economic and cultural loss, including interest". Described as "the most significant [case]… since Mabo", the High Court ruled for the first time on compensation for the extinguishment of native title in Australia.

=== 2022–2023: Tropical Cyclone Ellie ===
Tropical Cyclone Ellie caused extensive flooding in Timber Creek, after it moved through the Northern Territory first from 22 December 2022, and then again after it crossed the border back into NT from Western Australia in early January. It was described as once-in-50-year flooding. Remote communities in the area had been cut off as roads remained closed. Victoria Daly Region Mayor Brian Pedwell said that better emergency procedures needed to be developed to help the community cope with future such disasters, after evacuees had to take shelter on a basketball court before being to a defence base.

== Climate ==
Timber Creek is a tropical savanna climate (Köppen climate classification Aw) with distinct wet and dry seasons. The annual rainfall is 979mm with the heaviest falls occurring during the wet season months November – April. High humidity and overnight temperatures as well as large thunderstorms characterise this season. The Victoria River is prone to flooding during these months. The dry season months, May–October, see minimal rainfall, blue skies, less humidity and cooler overnight temperatures.

Climate data for Timber Creek, elevation 20 m (66 ft), (1991–2014 normals, extremes 1981–2014)
Month	Jan	Feb	Mar	Apr	May	Jun	Jul	Aug	Sep	Oct	Nov	Dec	Year
Record high °C (°F)	43.1 (109.6)	41.9 (107.4)	42.5 (108.5)	39.9 (103.8)	38.6 (101.5)	36.1 (97.0)	37.5 (99.5)	39.7 (103.5)	41.1 (106.0)	43.6 (110.5)	43.7 (110.7)	43.5 (110.3)	43.7 (110.7)
Mean daily maximum °C (°F)	36.0 (96.8)	35.0 (95.0)	35.5 (95.9)	35.3 (95.5)	32.8 (91.0)	30.4 (86.7)	30.8 (87.4)	32.9 (91.2)	36.8 (98.2)	38.3 (100.9)	38.5 (101.3)	37.1 (98.8)	35.0 (94.9)
Mean daily minimum °C (°F)	24.9 (76.8)	24.6 (76.3)	23.4 (74.1)	21.2 (70.2)	18.0 (64.4)	15.2 (59.4)	14.6 (58.3)	15.3 (59.5)	20.1 (68.2)	23.9 (75.0)	24.9 (76.8)	25.3 (77.5)	21.0 (69.7)
Record low °C (°F)	16.9 (62.4)	19.4 (66.9)	15.6 (60.1)	11.0 (51.8)	7.6 (45.7)	5.0 (41.0)	3.8 (38.8)	4.6 (40.3)	10.2 (50.4)	10.6 (51.1)	15.1 (59.2)	17.8 (64.0)	3.8 (38.8)
Average rainfall mm (inches)	262.6 (10.34)	242.9 (9.56)	144.7 (5.70)	32.0 (1.26)	7.4 (0.29)	2.7 (0.11)	0.7 (0.03)	0.4 (0.02)	5.1 (0.20)	29.2 (1.15)	85.1 (3.35)	185.7 (7.31)	998.5 (39.32)
Average rainy days (≥ 1.0 mm)	15.1	14	9.6	1.9	0.7	0.3	0.1	0.0	0.7	2.8	6.8	11.9	63.9
Source: Australian Bureau of Meteorology

== Demographics ==
There were 278 persons resident in Timber Creek at the 2021 census. This was an increase of 11.6% from the 249 residents reported at the 2016 census. 54.8% of the population was male and 45.2% female. 155 persons (56%) identified as Aboriginal and/or Torres Strait Islanders. The median age of residents was 33 years, with 75% of the population was born in Australia.

The most common languages spoken in the town were English and Ngaliwurru. Of those who reported a religious affiliation, the largest group was Pentecostal (22%). While median weekly incomes were lower for individuals than both the Northern Territory and national levels, household incomes were higher than the national median in Timber Creek.

== Attractions ==
The nearest official visitor centre is the Katherine Visitor Information Centre, on the Stuart Highway in Katherine.

=== Judbarra National Park ===
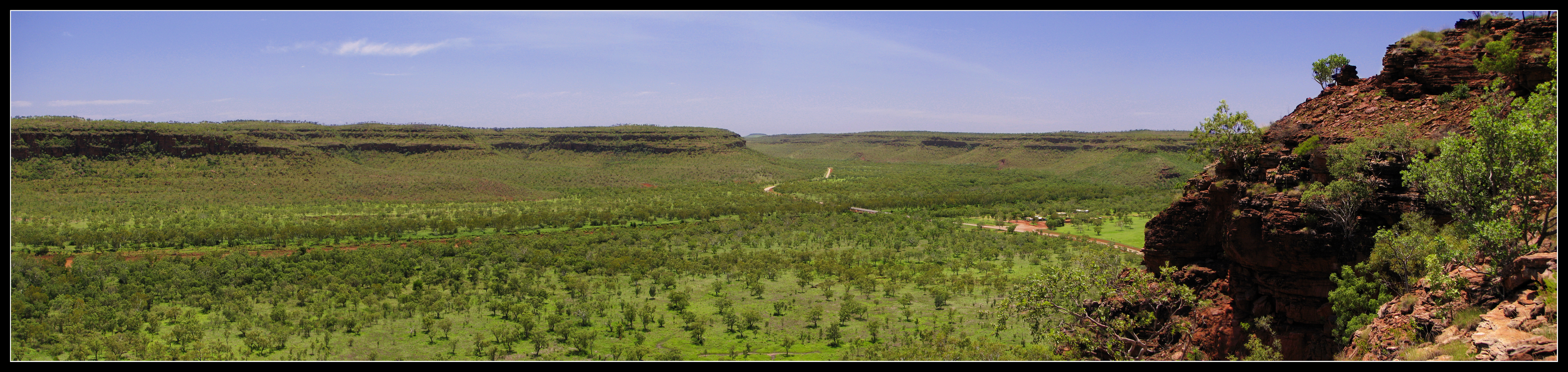
Judbarra - Gregory National Park

Judbarra National Park, the largest part of which is situated to the south-west of Timber Creek, encompasses 13,000 km^{2} (5,000 sq mi) of wilderness, covering tropical and semi-arid landscapes. It is significant for the natural beauty and traces of Aboriginal culture throughout the park. It is open all year round for fishing, camping and four-wheel drive activities. The park was formerly known as Gregory National Park, but on 21 October 2011, it was announced that under a joint management plan with the traditional owners, the park would be dual-named "Judbarra / Gregory" for ten years. The plan aims to preserve the unique cultural heritage found at this place. From 2021, its official name became Judbarra National Park.

=== Gregory's Tree ===
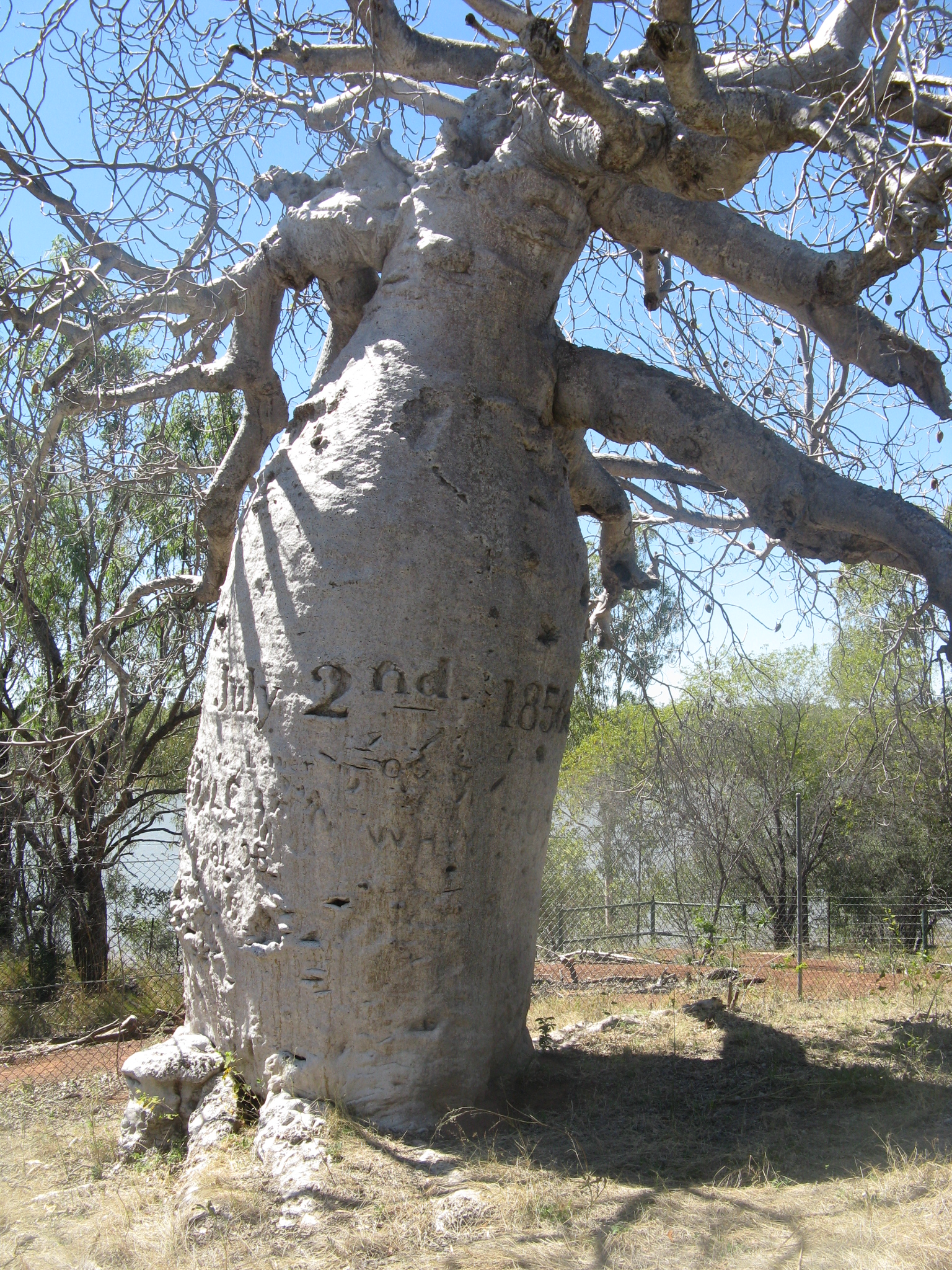
"Gregory's Tree" by the Victoria River, west of the town

"Gregory's Tree" is a large boab tree on which explorer A.C. Gregory's party inscribed the arrival and departure dates of the 1855–56 expedition to explore the Victoria River and surrounds. The tree is located at the northernmost point of the Gregory National Park at the expedition's original campsite by the river bank and is a short drive from the Victoria Highway and is well signposted. The site itself has boardwalks and information signs detailing its history. The tree is registered both as a heritage place and an Aboriginal sacred site.

=== Timber Creek Police Station Museum ===
The first police station in Timber Creek was established in 1898, comprising a hut and goat paddock. It was upgraded to iron and steel in 1908, and this building is now heritage-listed and serves as a museum with local history and law enforcement exhibits, known as the Timber Creek Police Station Museum. The main building was restored in the 1980s. The museum precinct includes outbuildings and grave sites. The buildings are maintained by the National Trust of Australia (Northern Territory).

=== Other attractions ===
Other attractions in the town include the Bronco Panel Sculpture, the Timber Creek Heritage Trail, Timber Creek Lookout, and memorial plaques dedicated to the "Nackeroos". Fishing for barramundi is a popular pastime, particularly near the Big Horse Creek campsite, around 10 km (6.2 mi) west of the town.

== Governance and infrastructure ==
The Timber Creek office of the Victoria Daly Regional Council serves the nearby outstations and communities of Muruning, Myatt, Gulardi, Gilwi as well as communities further away, such as Bulla, Amanbidji, and Menngen. The office employs 18 staff members, who are responsible for looking after parks and gardens, waste management, and administration; as well as delivering services such as community night patrol, aged care, and sports & recreation.

The Ngaliwurru-Wuli Aboriginal Corporation (NWAC) was established around 1986 or 1987 the Associations Act (NT) to serve as an outstation/ homelands resource centre. In 2019 it transitioned to become an Aboriginal corporation, under the Corporations (Aboriginal and Torres Strait Islander) Act 2006. Its work includes building and infrastructure maintenance, municipal and essential services, as well as civil and construction work to other government departments and the general public. It also operates the local Centrelink agency. A mechanical workshop situated on Wilson Street is owned and operated by the NWAC.

Timber Creek has an automated power station capable of generating 1MW for the community. The generator was installed in 2005 and owned and operated by the government-owned PowerWater.

== Facilities ==
The Timber Creek School, the only school in the town, is a public school providing preschool, primary, and middle school classes. In the 2021 Australian census, there were 31 students enrolled at the school in August 2021.

The Timber Creek Health Centre, run by the Katherine West Health Board (KWHB), is staffed Monday–Friday by a health centre coordinator, GP, remote area nurses, and support staff. Various specialist services and KWHB program visit the centre on a regular basis.

The Timber Creek Travellers Rest (formerly Timber Creek Hotel and Circle F Caravan Park) is a large roadhouse, which includes a general store, petrol outlet, caravan park and holiday cabins, along with a swimming pool for customers.

There is also an Aboriginal-owned enterprise, Wirib Tourism Park, which is owned by the Gunamu Aboriginal Corporation. It has a general store (where bread is baked daily), camping and caravan sites, and holiday cabins.

Timber Creek is a stop for interstate coach services on the Darwin to Broome route. Buses stop at the roadhouse on the Victoria Highway.

There is an airstrip a few kilometres to the west of town, Timber Creek Airport.

== Bradshaw Field Training Area ==
The Bradshaw Field Training Area (BFTA) is a large army training area occupies approximately 870,000 ha (2,100,000 acres), starting 500 m (1,600 ft) north of Timber Creek, on the traditional lands of the Ngaliwurru, Jaminjung, and Nungali people. They were initially worried about talking to uniformed personnel, and thought that the army may drop bombs and disregard their sacred sites. However, the ADF engaged with local people through the Bradshaw Liaison Committee, and over time both sides developed a trusting and respectful partnership. Sites of cultural significance have been mapped by the ADF and their personnel made aware of them. The army personnel have also learned more about the local Aboriginal Australians, in particular their connection to Country.

An Indigenous Land Use Agreement (ILUA) ensures protection of and ongoing access to the cultural sites for cultural purposes. These were kept private for many years, but since around 2003 the trust and friendships with army personnel evolved to a point that the traditional owners started including soldiers and the US Marines in their cultural activities, and some have become friends. The Marines are part of the Marine Rotational Force based in Darwin.

The Timber Creek economy is improved with the influx of ADF personnel, as they need occasional accommodation in the town, as well as the provision of food and fuel. New local businesses have been set up which provide employment for local people. In addition, as part of the ILUA, funding has been made available for local children to attend boarding schools as well as adults going to university.

In September 2021, residents of Timber Creek were shown around the base during Exercise Koolendong, which gave employment to the 18 staff at the Aboriginal-owned Bradshaw & Timber Creek Contracting & Resource Company. MRF-D commanding officer, Colonel David Banning, expressed his appreciation to the traditional owners for their hospitality and ongoing support of the army.
