= Marine Rotational Force – Darwin =

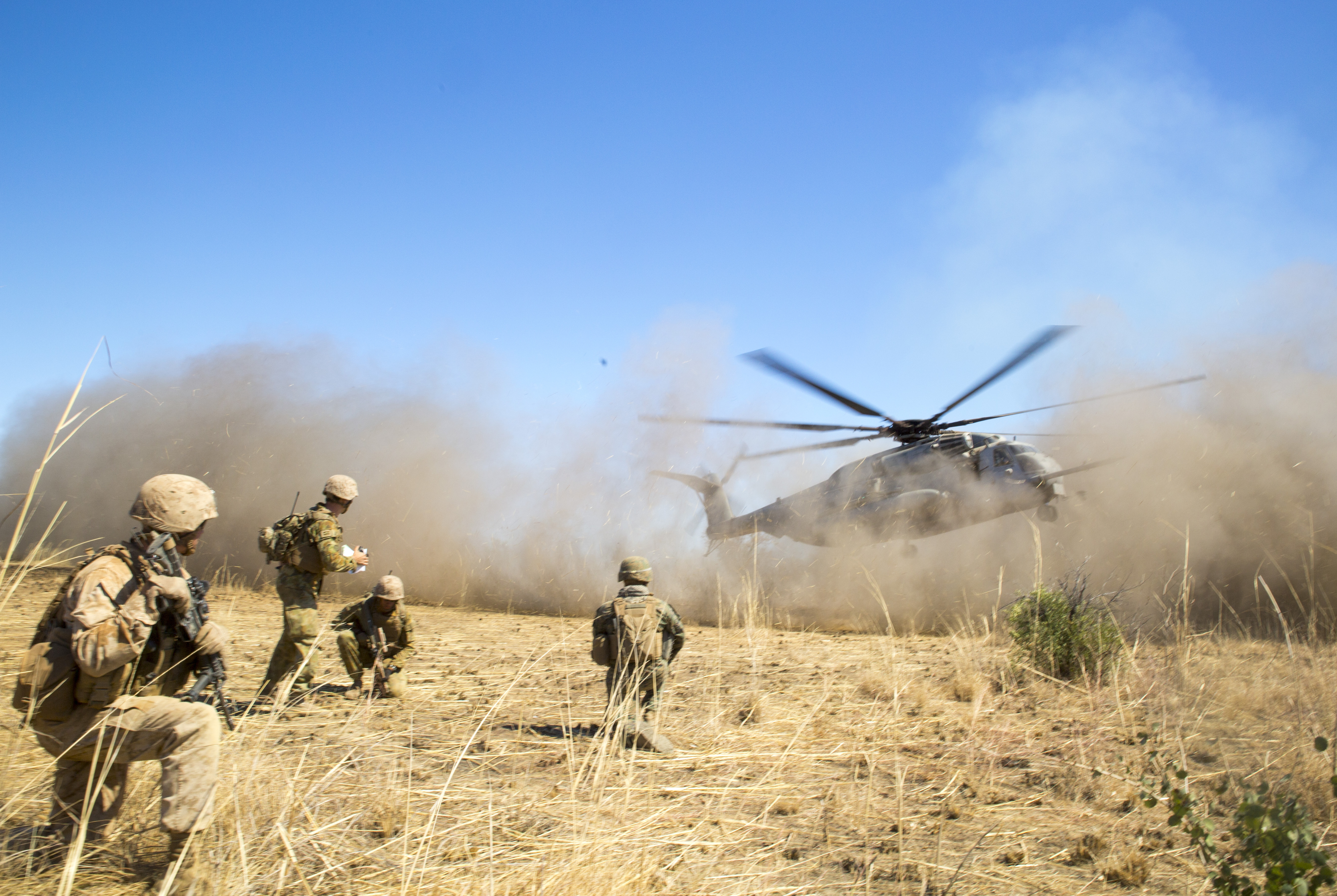
- US Marines assigned to the Marine Rotational Force – Darwin and Australian soldiers prepare to board an American CH-53E Super Stallion in 2014
- Country: United States
- Branch: United States Marine Corps
- Type: Marine Air-Ground Task Force

Commanders
- Current commander: Colonel B. Sullivan

Marine Rotational Force – Darwin (MRF-D) is a marine air-ground task force of the United States Marine Corps based at Robertson Barracks and at RAAF Base Darwin, near the city of Darwin in the Northern Territory of Australia.

== History ==
On 16 November 2011, the Australian prime minister, Julia Gillard, and U.S. president Barack Obama announced that starting in 2012 U.S. Marines would deploy to Darwin on a rotational basis for about six months to conduct exercises and train with the Australian Defence Force in the Northern Territory.

The first rotation of about 200 US Marines deployed to Australia in April 2012. On 14 June 2013, the prime minister announced that in 2014 the size of the deployment would increase to 1,150 U.S. Marines, to be based at Robertson Barracks.

During the 2023 rotation, MRF-D suffered a tragedy when one of their MV-22 Osprey helicopters crashed during a training event, resulting in the loss of three Marines.

As of February 2024, it was reported that up to 2,500 Marines had been stationed at Darwin each year.

== Activities ==
During their six-month deployment, Marines train with their Australian counterparts in live fire exercises at various locations, including Bradshaw Field Training Area (BFTA). This builds camaraderie and combat effectiveness between the two coalition forces. Both forces train the other in their military methods which include artillery fire, infantry tactics, communications equipment, and other various military training.

The current composition of MRF-D's cyclical nature follows the wet and dry seasonal weather patterns of Darwin. During the dry season, the MAGTF trains and during the wet season, the Ground Equipment Staging Program (GESP) works to maintain key equipment. The newly created Marine Coordination Element (MCE) operates year-round to maintain relationships and seamless transition.

In September 2021, after residents of Timber Creek were shown around BFTA during Exercise Koolendong, MRF-D commanding officer Colonel David Banning expressed his appreciation to the traditional owners for their hospitality and ongoing support. The Marines have built good relationships with the local Aboriginal Australian people at BFTA.

== Assets ==
- Key
  - GCE = Ground Combat Element
  - ACE = Aviation Combat Element
  - LCE = Logistic Combat Element
- MRF-D (April – October 2012)
  - GCE – Fox Company, 2nd Battalion 3rd Marines
- MRF-D (April – October 2013)
  - GCE – Lima Company, 3rd Battalion 3rd Marines
- MRF-D (April – October 2014)
  - GCE – 1st Battalion 5th Marines
  - ACE – Marine Heavy Helicopter Squadron 463 (HMH-463) with Sikorsky CH-53E Super Stallions
  - LCE – Combat Logistics Regiment 3 (CLR-3)
- MRF-D (April – October 2015)
  - GCE – 1st Battalion 4th Marines
  - ACE – HMH-463 with Sikorsky CH-53E Super Stallions
- MRF-D (April – October 2016)
  - GCE – 1st Battalion 1st Marines
  - ACE – Marine Light Attack Helicopter Squadron 367 (HMLA-367) with Bell UH-1Y Venoms.
- MRF-D 17.2 (April – October 2017)
  - GCE – 3rd Battalion 4th Marines
  - ACE – Marine Light Attack Helicopter Squadron 367 (HMLA-367) with Bell AH-1Z Vipers, and Bell UH-1Y Venoms. Marine Medium Tiltrotor Squadron 268 (VMM-268) with Bell Boeing MV-22B Ospreys.
- MRF-D 18.2 (April – October 2018)
  - GCE – 2nd Battalion 4th Marines
  - GCE – Mike Battery, 3rd Battalion 11th Marines
  - ACE – Marine Medium Tiltrotor Squadron 268 (VMM-268) with Bell Boeing MV-22B Ospreys.
- MRF-D 19.2 (April – October 2019)
  - GCE – 1st Battalion, 1st Marines
  - GCE – India Battery, 3rd Battalion, 11th Marines
  - ACE – Marine Medium Tiltrotor Squadron 363 (VMM-363) with Bell Boeing MV-22B Ospreys. Marine Light Attack Helicopter Squadron 367 (HMLA-367) with Bell AH-1Z Vipers, and Bell UH-1Y Venoms
  - LCE – Combat Logistics Battalion 1
- MRF-D 20.2 (April - October 2020)
  - GCE - 3rd Battalion 7th Marines
  - GCE - Kilo Battery, 3rd Battalion, 11th Marines
  - ACE - Detachment, VMU-3
  - LCE - Combat Logistics Battalion 5
