= 1st Transportation Support Battalion =

1st Transportation Battalion
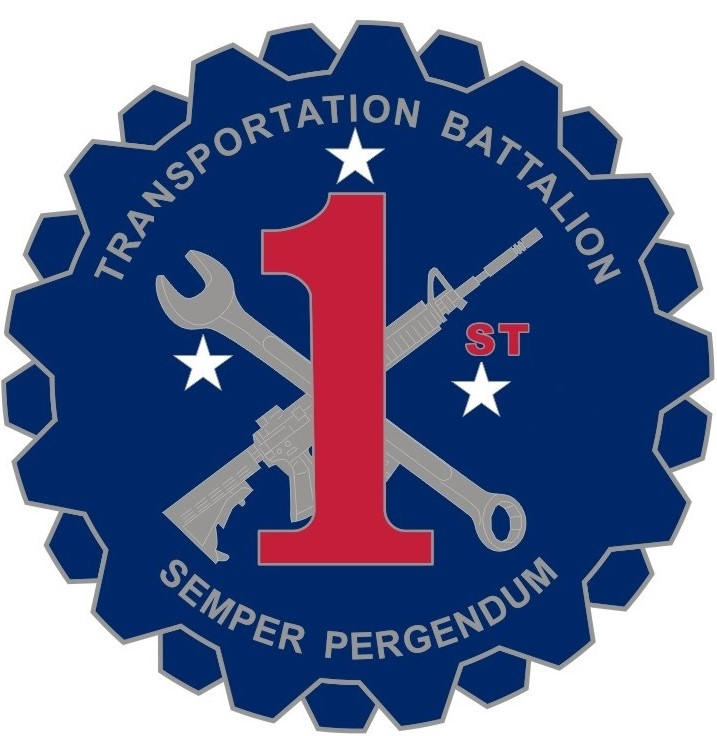
- Active: 5 Aug 1950 - 17 May 1971 30 Mar 1976 - 18 Dec 1998 1 Oct 2014 - 12 Jan 2024
- Country: United States of America
- Branch: United States Marine Corps
- Type: Combat Logistics
- Role: Provide General Support Combat Logistics Support to I MEF
- Part of: Combat Logistics Regiment 1; 1st Marine Logistics Group
- Garrison/HQ: MCB Camp Pendleton, California
- Motto: Semper Pergendum
- Engagements: Korean War: Battle of Chosin Reservoir; East-Central Front; Western Front; Vietnam War; Gulf War Operation Restore Hope

Commanders
- Current commander: not active

1st Transportation Battalion (TB) was a General Support (GS) logistics unit of the United States Marine Corps that was headquartered at Marine Corps Base Camp Pendleton, California. The unit last fell under the command of Combat Logistics Regiment 1 and the 1st Marine Logistics Group until deactivation on 12 January 2024.

== Mission ==
Provide transportation and throughput support for the Marine Expeditionary Force (MEF) to facilitate the distribution of personnel, equipment, and supplies by air, ground, and sea.

== Subordinate units ==
- Headquarters & Service Company
- Motor Transport Company A
- Motor Transport Company B

== History ==
=== Korean War ===
The 7th Motor Transport Battalion was activated at the outset of the Korean War on August 5, 1950, at Marine Corps Base Camp Pendleton, California. That same month the battalion departed the West Coast for Kobe, Japan where it staged for follow on tasking. On September 15, 1950, 7th Motor Transport Battalion began to come ashore during the Battle of Inchon. The battalion remained in support of the 1st Marine Division for the remainder of the war and took part in the Battle of Chosin Reservoir, fighting on the East-Central Front and action on the Western Front.

=== Inter-war years ===
After the Korean Armistice Agreement was signed the battalion remained in Korea until March 1955 when it was relocated back to MCB Camp Pendleton, CA. The battalion was reassigned to the 1st Marine Division in October 1955 and continued to train in the Southwestern United States for the next decade.

=== Vietnam War ===
7th Motor Transport Battalion landed in South Vietnam in March 1966. During its time in Vietnam the battalion supported combat operations near Da Nang, Chu Lai and Quảng Trị. 7th Motor Transport Battalion departed South Vietnam in February 1970. Arriving back at MCB Camp Pendleton in March 1970 the battalion was initially assigned to the 5th Marine Expeditionary Brigade. The battalion was again assigned to the 1st Marine Division in April 1971 only to be deactivated the next month on May 7, 1971.

=== 1970s - 1990s ===
7th Motor Transport Battalion was reactivated on March 30, 1976, at MCB Camp Pendleton, CA as part of the 1st Force Service Support Group (1st FSSG). The battalion deployed to Saudi Arabia in December 1990. It supported combat operations during the Gulf War and returned to the United States is April 1991. In December 1992, 7th Motor Transport Battalion was part of the Unified Task Force sent to Somalia to conduct humanitarian assistance. The battalion departed Somalia in February 1993. Elements of 7th Motor-T next participated in Operation Vigilant Warrior in Kuwait in response to build up of Iraqi Republican Guard forces on the border in October 1994. The battalion was deactivated on December 8, 1998.

=== Reactivation ===
1st Transportation Support Battalion was reactivated at MCB Camp Pendleton, CA on October 1, 2014, as part of Combat Logistics Regiment 1 within the 1st Marine Logistics Group.

=== Redesignation ===
On April 2, 2021, 1st Transportation Support Battalion was redesignated as 1st Transportation Battalion. The redesignation of 1st Transportation Support Battalion to 1st Transportation Battalion and deactivation of Landing Support Company and Support Company were modernization initiatives conducted to best align the United States Marine Corps to support the National Defense Strategy.

=== Deactivation ===
On 12 January 2024, the unit was deactivated, and subordinate elements of 1st TB were aligned with 1st LSB to become 1st Distribution Support Battalion. The 1st TB headquarters was redesignated as Headquarters and Support Battalion. The last 1st TB commander was LtCol Andrew Harkins.

== Unit awards ==
A unit citation or commendation is an award bestowed upon an organization for the action cited. Members of the unit who participated in said actions are allowed to wear on their uniforms the awarded unit citation. 1st TSB has been presented with the following awards: .

Streamer	Award	Year(s)	Additional Info
	Presidential Unit Citation Streamer with three Bronze Stars	1950, 1950, 1951, 1966–67	Korea, Vietnam
	Joint Meritorious Unit Award Streamer	1992–1993	Somalia
	Navy Unit Commendation Streamer with three Bronze Stars	1952-53, 1967–68, 1968–69, 1990–91	Korea, Vietnam, Gulf War
	Meritorious Unit Commendation Streamer with two Bronze Stars	1969, 1984–86, 1995–1997	Vietnam
	National Defense Service Streamer with three Bronze Stars	1951–1954, 1961–1974, 1990–1995, 2001–present	Korean War, Vietnam War, Gulf War, war on terrorism
	Korean Service Streamer with two Siler Stars	1950-1953	
	Armed Forces Expeditionary Streamer	1992–1993	Somalia
	Vietnam Service Streamer with two Silver Stars		
	Southwest Asia Service Streamer with three Bronze Stars	1990-91	Gulf War
A blue streamer with yellow, red, and white horizontal stripes	Global War on Terrorism Service Streamer	2001–present	
	Korean Presidential Unit Citation Streamer	1950	
	Vietnam Gallantry Cross with Palm Streamer	1965–1971	
	Vietnam Meritorious Unit Citation Civil Actions Streamer	1965–1971	

== See also ==
- List of United States Marine Corps battalions
- Organization of the United States Marine Corps
