= Combat Logistics Regiment 1 =

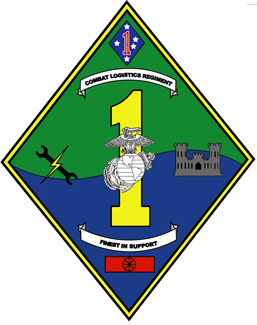
- Country: United States
- Allegiance: United States of America
- Branch: United States Marine Corps
- Type: Logistics
- Part of: 1st Marine Logistics Group; I Marine Expeditionary Force
- Garrison/HQ: Marine Corps Base Camp Pendleton
- Motto: "Finest in Support"
- Engagements: Operation Desert Storm; Operation Iraqi Freedom: 2003 invasion of Iraq

Commanders
- Current commander: Col Bolivar "Patrick" Pluas

Combat Logistics Regiment 1 (CLR 1) is a logistics regiment of the United States Marine Corps. The unit is based out of the Marine Corps Base Camp Pendleton, California and falls under the command of the 1st Marine Logistics Group and the I Marine Expeditionary Force (I MEF).

== Mission ==
To provide logistics support to the 1st Marine Division beyond its organic capabilities in any environment and throughout the spectrum of conflict in order to allow the division to continue operations independent of any logistically driven operational pauses.

== Organization 2024 ==
As of March 2024 the Combat Logistics Regiment 1 consists of:

- Combat Logistics Regiment 1
  - Headquarters Company
  - Combat Logistics Battalion 1
  - Combat Logistics Battalion 5
  - Combat Logistics Battalion 7
  - 1st Distribution Support Battalion (a FY24 Force Design redesignation of 1st Landing Support Battalion with the addition of motor transport elements from 1st Transportation Support Battalion)

== See also ==
- List of United States Marine Corps regiments
- Organization of the United States Marine Corps
