= Bradshaw Field Training Area =

Coordinates: 15.34760°S 130.27607°E

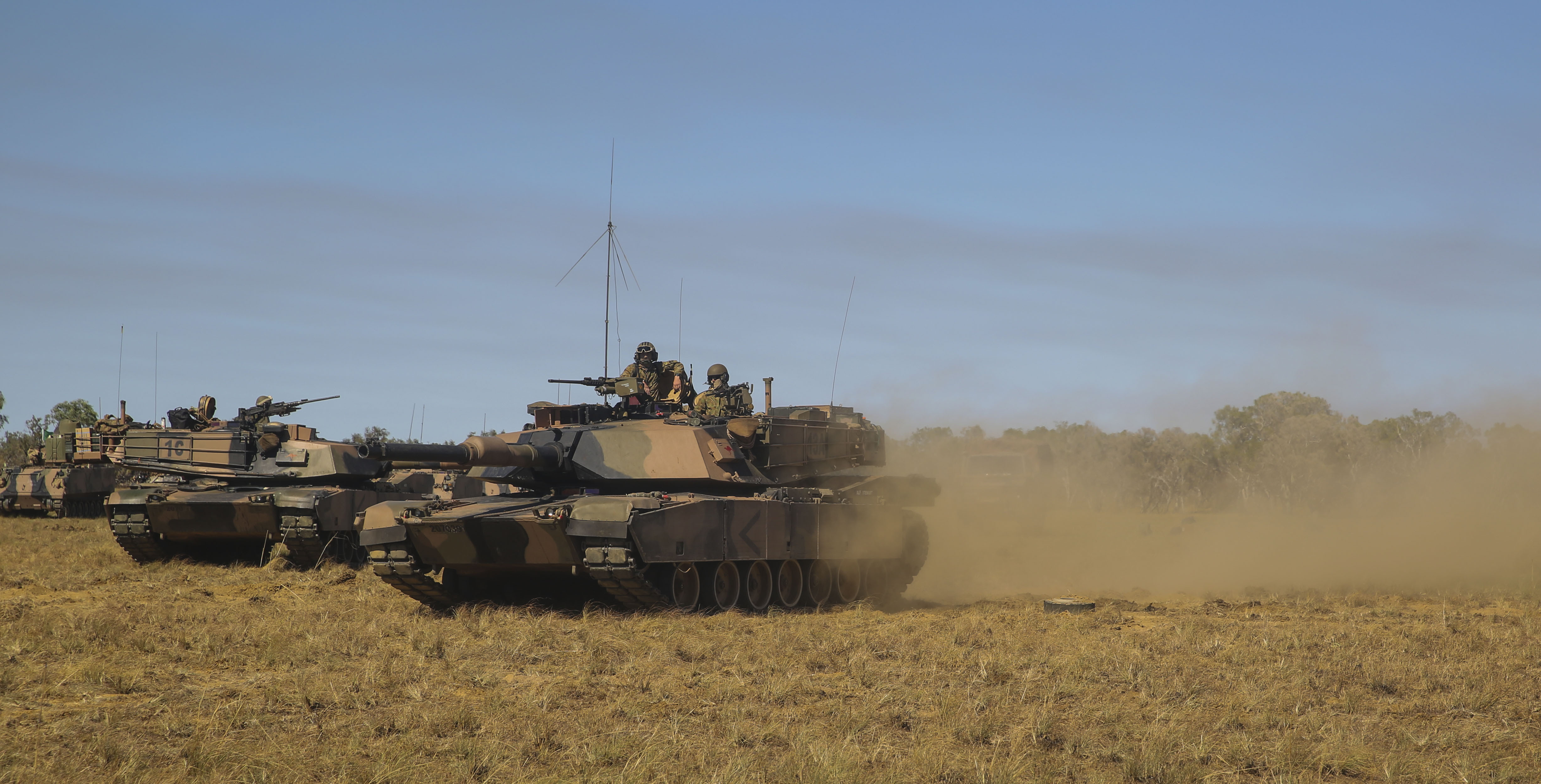
- Australian Army M1A1 Abrams tanks during an exercise at Bradshaw in 2014

Site information
- Type: Training area
- Owner: Australian Army

Site history
- In use: 1996–current

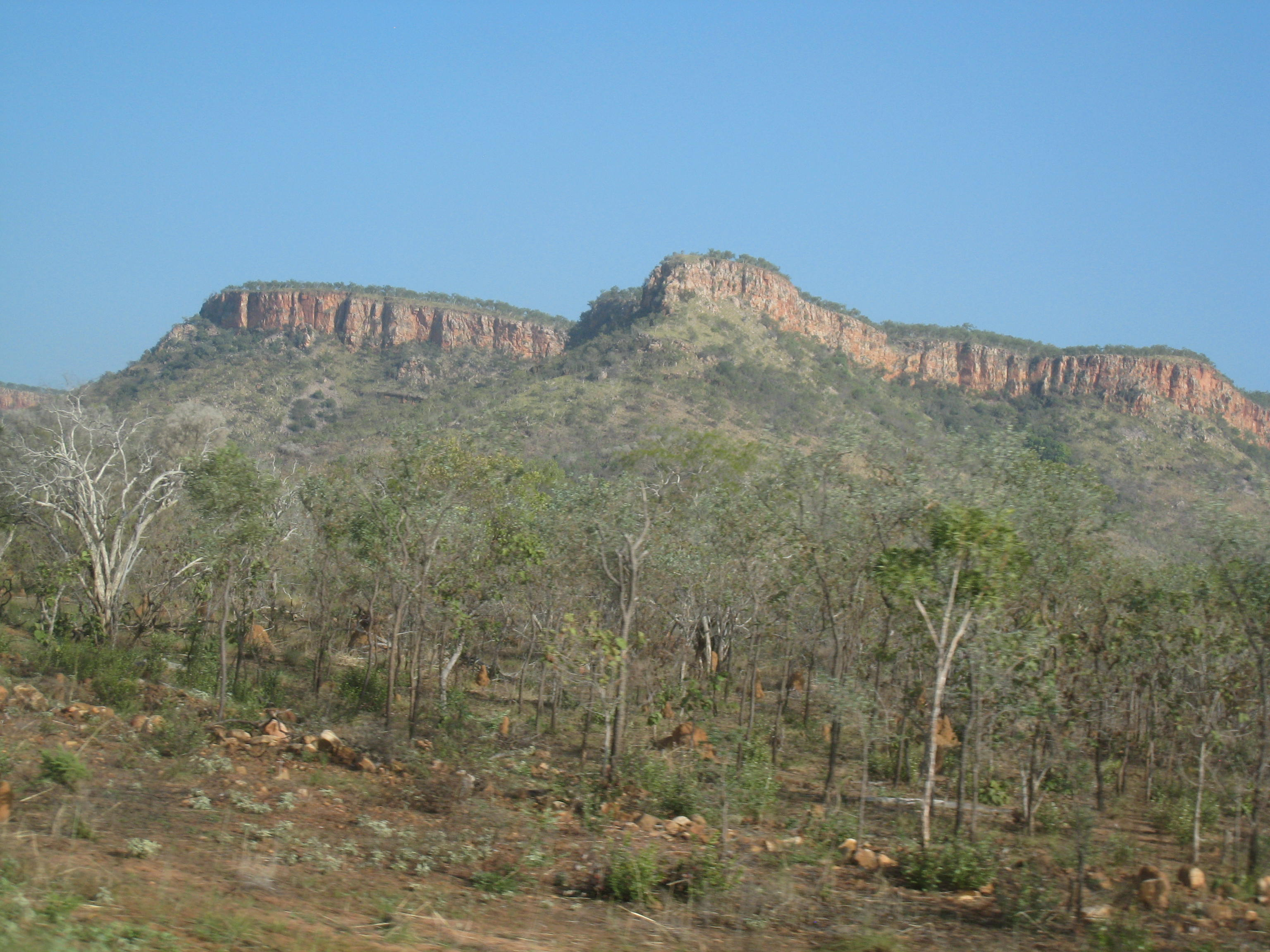
Yambarran Ranges, BFTA

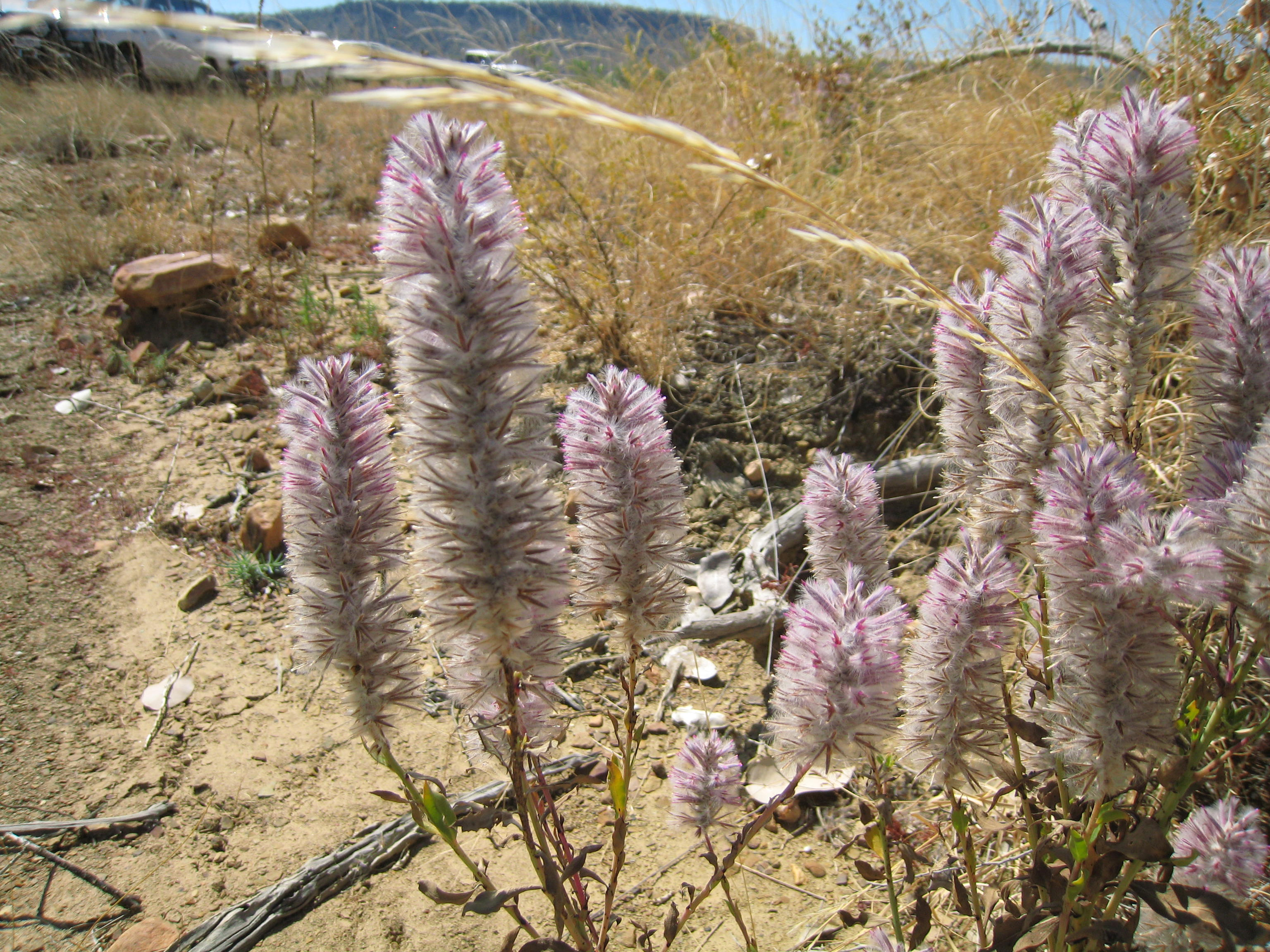
Ptilotus exaltatus, Angalarri River

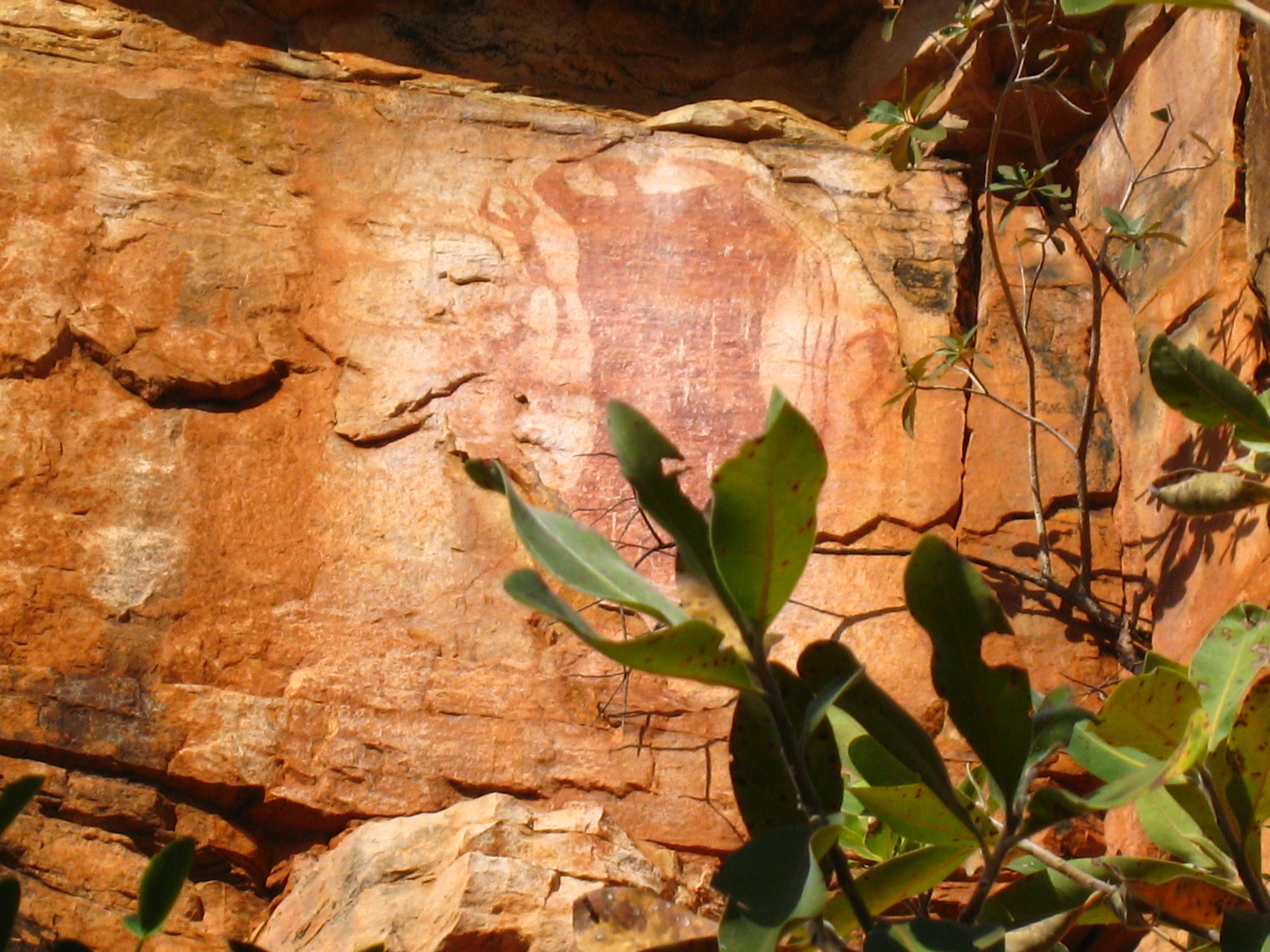
Aboriginal rock art, Inukalen Cataracts

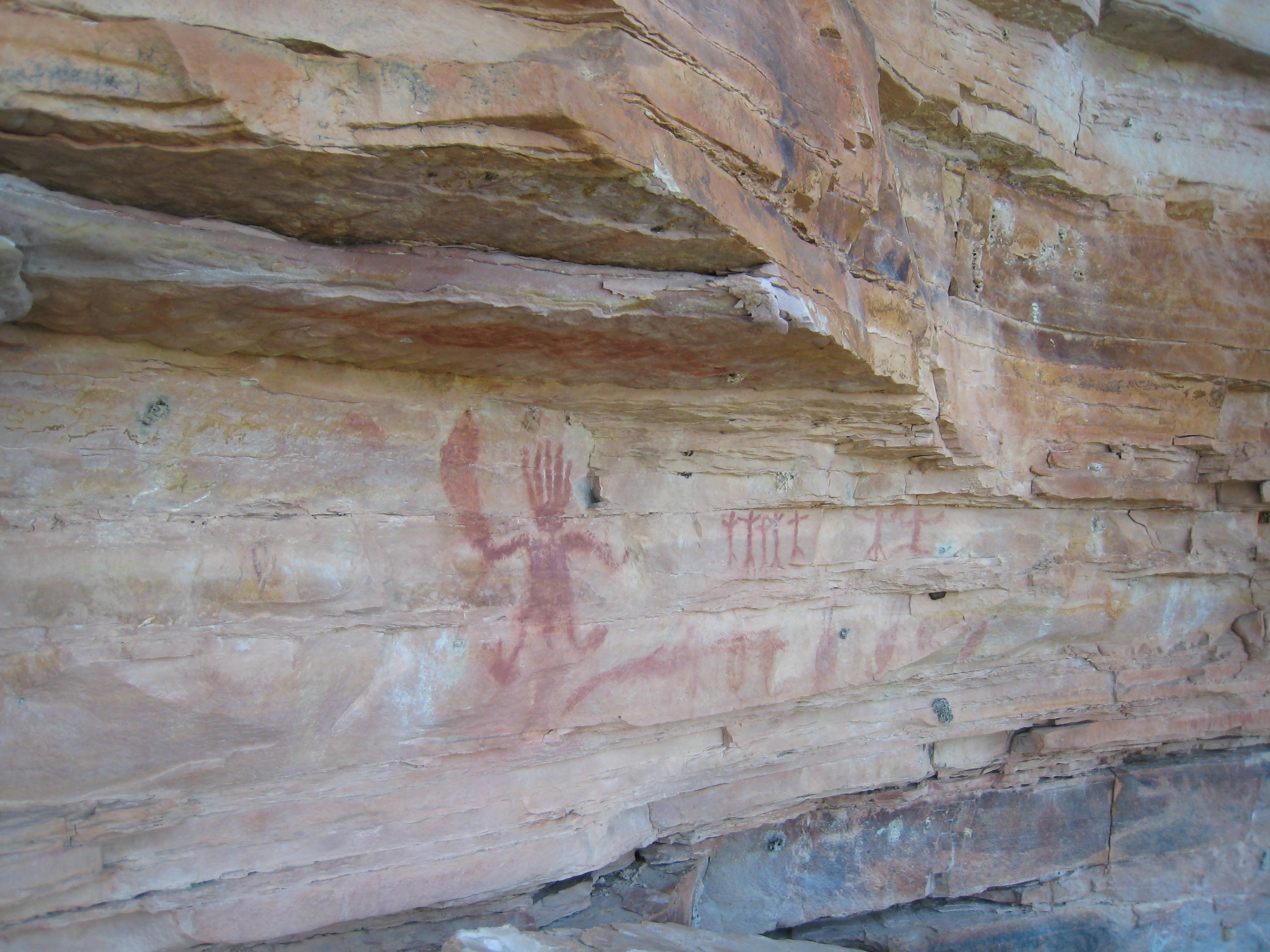
Aboriginal rock art, Yambarran Plateau

The Bradshaw Field Training Area (BFTA) is a large army training area located 600 km (370 mi) south of Darwin in the Northern Territory of Australia. It is used for training by the Australian Army, and as an Australia-U.S. combined training centre with the U.S. Marines stationed at Darwin.

== History ==
The training area is a former cattle station, Bradshaw Station, which was purchased by the Australian Government for military training in 1996.

In October 1996, the Department of Defence proposed to establish the Bradshaw Field Training Area, which was to be used for army manoeuvres and field live firing exercises. After NT Minister for Lands, Planning and Environment determined in November 1996 that an environmental impact statement and Environment Management Plan needed to be done for the proposal, an environmental impact assessment was carried out and the report published in July 1998.

In April 2021, prime minister Scott Morrison visited Robertson Barracks, where he announced a spend of A$747 million to upgrade the Robertson Barracks Close Training Area, Kangaroo Flats Training Area, Mount Bundey Training Area and Bradshaw Field Training Area. This was part of a total of A$8 billion allocated for spending on defence installations in the Northern Territory.

In 2024, the Bradshaw Field Training Area received the upgrades as part of the Northern Territory Training Areas and Ranges Project under the 2024 National Defence Strategy. Upgrades included a new medical facility, a training camp with a 250-person capacity, urban operations training facility, accommodation camps, and road infrastructure upgrades. Nackeroo Airfield received a pave runway and apron, and opened on 4 June, 2024, allowing it to accommodate aircraft such as the C-17A Globemaster III and Bell Boeing V-22 Osprey.

== Description and use ==
The training area occupies approximately 870,000 ha (2,100,000 acres), starting 500 m (1,600 ft) north of the settlement of Timber Creek. It is one of the largest live-fire training ranges in the world.

The facility is heavily used by the Marine Rotational Force – Darwin, a marine air-ground task force of the United States Marine Corps.

Nackeroo Airfield is also located within the training area. It is a large dirt airstrip capable of operating C-17 Globemaster transport aircraft, built by Australian Defence Force and United States Military engineers at BFTA in less than four weeks during Exercise Talisman Sabre in 2007.

== Relationships with traditional owners ==
The Ngaliwurru, Jaminjung, and Nungali people are the traditional owners of Timber Creek and the land on which BFTA is based. They were initially worried about talking to uniformed personnel, and thought that the army may drop bombs and disregard their sacred sites. However, the ADF engaged with local people through the Bradshaw Liaison Committee, and over time both sides developed a trusting and respectful partnership. Sites of cultural significance have been mapped by the ADF and their personnel made aware of them. The army personnel have also learned more about the local Aboriginal Australians, in particular their connection to Country.

An Indigenous Land Use Agreement (ILUA) ensures protection of and ongoing access to the cultural sites for cultural purposes. These were kept private for many years, but since around 2003 the trust and friendships with army personnel evolved to a point that the traditional owners started including soldiers and US Marines in their cultural activities, and some have become friends. As part of the ILUA, funding has been made available for local children to attend boarding schools as well as adults going to university.

The local economy is improved with the influx of ADF personnel, and their requirements for occasional accommodation in Timber Creek, as well as the provision of food and fuel. New local businesses have been set up which provide employment for local people.

In September 2021, residents of Timber Creek were shown around the base during Exercise Koolendong, which gave employment to the 18 staff at the Aboriginal-owned Bradshaw & Timber Creek Contracting & Resource Company. MRF-D commanding officer, Colonel David Banning, expressed his appreciation to the traditional owners for their hospitality and ongoing support of the army.
