= Northern Territory v Mr Griffiths and Lorraine Jones =

Law case in the Northern Territory, Australia

- Court: High Court of Australia
- Full case name: Northern Territory v Mr A. Griffiths (deceased) and Lorraine Jones on behalf of the Ngaliwurru and Nungali Peoples [2019] HCA 7
- Decided: 13 March 2019
- Citation: (2019) HCA 7

Case history
- Appealed from: The Full Court of the Federal Court of Australia

Court membership
- Judges sitting: Susan Kiefel AC, Virginia Bell AC, Stephen Gageler AC, Patrick Keane AC, Geoffrey Nettle AC, Michelle Gordon AC & James Edelman

Location of Timber Creek in the Northern Territory

Northern Territory v Mr Griffiths and Lorraine Jones is an Australian native title court case that was heard in the High Court of Australia. This case was an appeal by the Northern Territory and the Commonwealth of Australia of the decision handed down by the Full Court of the Federal Court of Australia in Northern Territory of Australia v Griffiths [2017] FCAFC 106. The High Court of Australia ruled to reduce the amount of compensation awarded to the Ngaliwurru People and the Nungali People by the Full Court of the Federal Court of Australia. This compensation had been granted to the Ngaliwurru and Nungali Peoples as a remedy for deeds taken by the Northern Territory Government that were previously established by the judicial system to have extinguished native title. The total amount of compensation awarded was reduced from $2,899,446 to $2,530,350. This compensation had been awarded for the monetary and non-monetary loss, as well as interest, associated with the extinguishment of native title. The decision made by the High Court meant the appeals made by the Northern Territory and the Commonwealth were "allowed in part". The case of Northern Territory v Mr Griffiths and Lorraine Jones has been labelled one of the most significant native title court cases since Mabo v Queensland (No 1) and Mabo v Queensland (No 2). The Ngaliwurru and Nungali Peoples reside in Timber Creek, Northern Territory. The High Court granted special leave for the appeal on 16 February 2018. The High Court, which is situated in Canberra, had not heard a case in the Northern Territory prior to this.

== Background Information ==
The Federal Court of Australia ruled in Griffiths v Northern Territory (2006) 165 FCR 300 that the Ngaliwurru and Nungali Peoples bear native title in the town of Timber Creek. The trial judge, Mark Weinberg AO, QC held that these rights were non-exclusive. This ruling was appealed to the Full Court of the Federal Court in Griffiths v Northern Territory of Australia (2007) 165 FCR 391. The Full Court held that these rights are exclusive. Judge Mansfield AM, QC ruled in Griffiths v Northern Territory of Australia [2014] FCA 256, which was heard in the Federal Court of Australia, that the Government of the Northern Territory had an obligation to compensate the Ngaliwurru and Nungali People given prior actions taken by the Northern Territory which were found to have extinguished these rights and interests. These acts, which are known as the compensable acts, included the building of public infrastructure and the allocation of development leases in the last two decades of the twentieth century on native land belonging to the people of Timber Creek. These actions took place after the Racial Discrimination Act 1975 (Commonwealth) took force, a statutory law enacted by the Parliament of Australia.

== Griffiths v Northern Territory of Australia (No 3) [2016] FCA 900 ==
This was the first case in which the amount of compensation to be awarded to the Ngaliwurru and Nungali Peoples was established; it was heard in the Federal Court of Australia. The ruling was handed down by Judge Mansfield on 24 August 2016. It was established in Griffiths v Northern Territory of Australia [2014] FCA 256 that the Government of the Northern Territory had a liability to compensate the Ngaliwurru and Nungali Peoples for the extinguishment of previously established native title rights. Alan Griffiths and Lorraine Jones, on behalf of the Ngaliwurru and Nungali Peoples, lodged an application on 2 August 2011 with the Federal Court of Australia for the payment of native title compensation under the Native Title Act 1993 (Commonwealth). This claim was in relation to fifty-three compensable acts that took place on thirty-nine lots and four public roads. Compensation was, however, only awarded for thirty-one of the fifty-three compensable acts.

=== Ruling handed down by the Federal Court of Australia ===
The Ngaliwurru and Nungali Peoples were initially awarded $3,300,661 in compensation for the extinguishment of their land by Judge Mansfield in Griffiths v Northern Territory of Australia (No 3) [2016] FCA 900. The date of judgement was 24 August 2016. $512,400 was awarded for the monetary amount owing for the extinguishment of native title, $1,488,261 was for interest on the sum of $512,400 and the remaining $1,300,000 was awarded for intangible cultural and spiritual loss. Judge Mansfield derived the total compensation of $3,300,661 from an assessment that the compensation amount payable should be equal to "80% of [the] market value of freehold estates in the land the subject of the compensable acts". Judge Mansfield held that the traditional method for determining the financial value of a party's interests in land as "established in Spencer v Commonwealth (1907) 5 CLR 418; [1907] HCA 82" was not suitable given "the only purchaser could be the Northern Territory or the Commonwealth". Any Ngaliwurru and Nungali persons who belong to the Maiyalaniwung, Yanturi, Makalamayi, Wantawul or Wunjaiyi tribes of the Timber Creek area have a right to a share in the compensation amount awarded.

== Northern Territory of Australia v Griffiths [2017] FCAFC 106 ==
The Northern Territory of Australia and the Commonwealth of Australia appealed the ruling handed down by Judge Mansfield in Griffiths v Northern Territory of Australia (No 3) [2016] FCA 900. The appeal case is known as Northern Territory of Australia v Griffiths [2017] FCAFC 106 and it was heard by the Full Court of the Federal Court of Australia. The Northern Territory of Australia argued in its appeal that it was incorrect for Judge Mansfield to have established that the monetary value of the native title rights was equivalent to eighty percent of the value of the land in question, on the basis that the legal system should not "treat non-exclusive native title as valued in the same way as if those rights were held by a non-Indigenous person". It was the legal contention of the Northern Territory that this calculation was incorrect because it took into account the racial identity of the person to which the land rights belong, rather than the nature of ownership of said land. Given this, the Northern Territory of Australia contended that the compensation payable to the residents of Timber Creek could not be equal to eighty percent of the value of the land. The Northern Territory submitted that Judge Mansfield should have ruled to the effect that the monetary value of the extinguished native title rights owing to the residents of Timber Creek was the usage value and the negotiation value of the land upon which compensable acts attributable to the Northern Territory Government took place. The Northern Territory argued that Judge Mansfield was incorrect to dismiss the professional testimony of Mr Wayne Lonergan who supported the Northern Territory's legal argument that the liability for compensation should be no more than fifty percent of the financial worth of the land. The Commonwealth of Australia - in its appeal - also contended that the financial value of the extinguished native title rights and interests owing to the Ngaliwurru and Nungali Peoples was equal to fifty percent of the value of the land. It was the contention of the Claim Group (the Ngaliwurru and Nungali Peoples of Timber Creek) that the value of their impaired native title rights was equal to 100% of the freehold value of the land in question.

=== Ruling handed down by the Full Court of the Federal Court ===
The Full Court of the Federal Court found that the trial judge made errors in deriving the compensation amount to the effect of overvaluing the native title rights. The Full Court of the Federal Court on appeal awarded the Ngaliwurru and Nungali Peoples compensation calculated as 65% of the market value of the land in question. The outcome of this decision was that the total amount of compensation awarded to the people of Timber Creek was reduced from $3,300,661 to $2,899,446. The amount of compensation awarded for financial loss was decreased from $512,400 to $416,325 and the amount of interest was then calculated with respect to the new amount of financial loss compensation. The $1,300,000 allowance for cultural and spiritual loss remain unchanged. This case was heard by Anthony North QC, Michael Barker QC and Debra Mortimer.

== Ruling by the High Court of Australia ==
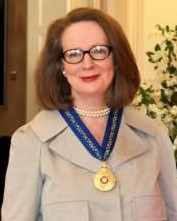
Chief Justice of the High Court of Australia, Susan Kiefel AC

Northern Territory v Alan Griffiths and Lorraine Jones has been considered a "landmark" native title case. This is because the clauses contained within the Native Title Act 1993 pertaining to the determination of compensation payable due to the extinguishment of native title have never been heard before in the High Court. This case will therefore establish a precedent for future native title compensation cases heard in the High Court. It has been stated that the precedent set in this case will give rise to the payment of significant amounts of money in related future cases where native title rights and interests have been found to be extinguished or impaired by acts attributable to external parties. The reduction in compensation awarded to the Ngaliwurru and Nungali Peoples was the result of the High Court's decision that the amount of compensation payable for the financial loss attributable to the extinguishment of native title rights is equivalent to fifty percent of the value of the land. This represents a reduction of fifteen percent from the sixty-five percent established by the Full Court of the Federal Court of Australia in Northern Territory of Australia v Griffiths [2017] FCAFC 106. The Northern Territory of Australia, not the Commonwealth of Australia - is the party that has been ordered by the High Court to pay the compensation amount awarded to the Ngaliwurru and Nungali Peoples. This is because Northern Territory was the party responsible for all the compensable acts recognised by the judicial system as having taken place in the Timber Creek area. The High Court of Australia varied the ruling made by the Full Court of the Federal Court in Griffiths v Northern Territory of Australia (2007) 165 FCR 391 such that the native title rights and interests borne by the Ngaliwurru and Nungali Peoples in the Timber Creek area are non-exclusive. The High Court reached this decision having considered that the Ngaliwurru and Nungali Peoples did not have the capacity to stop people from gaining entry to the land the subject of their native title rights and interests; the Ngaliwurru and Nungali Peoples did not have the ability to grant or deny people the right to gain access to their land. The determination that the native title rights and interests of the Ngaliwurru and Nungali Peoples in the Timber Creek area are non-exclusive was the reason why the High Court modified the calculation of the monetary amount of compensation payable from sixty-five percent of the worth of the land the subject of the native title rights and interests to fifty percent.

There were three legal matters put forth to the High Court in the case of Northern Territory v Mr A. Griffiths (deceased) and Lorraine Jones on behalf of the Ngaliwurru and Nungali Peoples [2019] HCA. In Decision One, the Northern Territory of Australia was the appellant and Mr A. Griffiths (deceased) and Lorraine Jones were the respondent. In Decision Two, the Commonwealth of Australia was the appellant and Mr. A Griffiths (deceased) and Lorraine Jones were the respondent. In Decision Three, Mr. A Griffiths (deceased) and Lorraine Jones were the appellant and the Northern Territory of Australia and ANOR were the respondent. The appeals put forth by the Northern Territory and by the Commonwealth of Australia were held in part by the High Court. This was the decision that meant the compensation awarded to the Ngaliwurru and Nungali People's by the Full Court of the Federal Court of Australia was reduced. This was achieved by the High Court overturning Order 2 made by the Full Court of the Federal Court of Australia in the case of Northern Territory of Australia v Griffiths [2017] FCAFC 106. The issues raised by the Ngaliwurru and Nungali Peoples in Decision Three were thrown out by the High Court and the implication of this is that the Ngaliwurru and Nungali Peoples are legally responsible for paying their legal representation.
