= Timber Creek Airport =

- IATA: TBK; ICAO: YTBR

Summary
- Location: Timber Creek, Northern Territory
- Elevation AMSL: 51 ft (16 m)
- Coordinates: 15°37′14″S 130°26′53″E
- Interactive map of Timber Creek Airport

Runways
Direction	Length		Surface
Direction	ft	m	Surface
10/28	3,408	1,039	Dirt

Timber Creek Airstrip (IATA:TBK, ICAO:YTBR) is a remote airstrip, located near the small remote town of Timber Creek in the Northern Territory. The airstrip is used as an emergency landing area for RFDS aircraft, and for public use. The airstrip has an access road off the Victoria Highway.

== Information ==
The airstrip has 1 runway, which has a heading of 10/28. The runway is dirt. There is a small parking area off the runway. There are no facilities like a terminal or avgas.
