= Combat Logistics Battalion 5 =

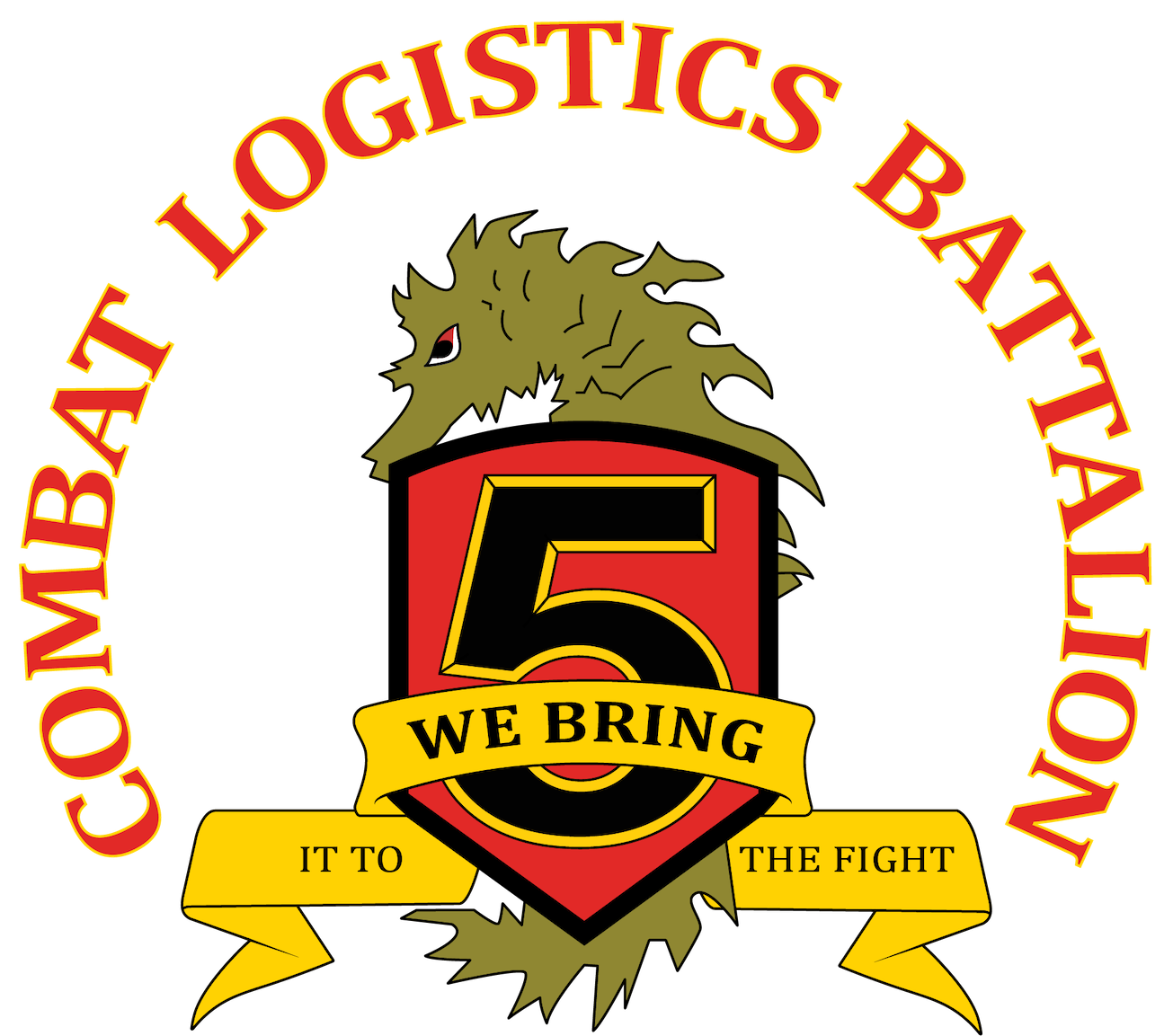
- Active: 25 May 2006 – present
- Country: United States
- Allegiance: United States of America
- Branch: United States Marine Corps
- Type: Logistics
- Part of: Combat Logistics Regiment 1; 1st Marine Logistics Group
- Garrison/HQ: Marine Corps Base Camp Pendleton
- Nickname: Warhorse
- Motto: "We Bring It to the Fight"
- Engagements: Operation Iraqi Freedom; Operation Enduring Freedom

Commanders
- Current commander: LtCol Daniel B. Katzman

Combat Logistics Battalion 5 (CLB-5) is a logistics battalion of the United States Marine Corps. CLB-5 is a subordinate battalion to Combat Logistics Regiment 1 and the 1st Marine Logistics Group. The unit is based out of the Marine Corps Base Camp Pendleton, California. The battalion callsign is "Warhorse". The unit slogan is "We bring it to the fight."

== Mission ==
Provide direct support tactical logistics to the 5th Marine Regiment beyond its organic capabilities in the areas of transportation, intermediate level supply, field level maintenance, and general engineering.

== Subordinate units ==
- Headquarters Company
- Combat Logistics Company Alpha
- Combat Logistics Company Bravo
- General Support Company

== History ==
Combat Logistics Battalion 5 was activated on 25 May 2006 at Camp Pendleton, California and assigned as a subordinate battalion to Combat Logistics Regiment 1.

- Participated in Operation Iraqi Freedom (OIF), Iraq from September 2006 to March 2007 and again in August 2008 to February 2009.
- Participated in Operation Enduring Freedom (OEF), Afghanistan from March to October 2010 and again from March to August 2012.
- Provided task organized logistics detachments in support of Special Purpose Marine Air-Ground Task Force (SPMAGTF) Crisis Response - CENTRAL COMMAND from 2015–2017.
- Participated in Marine Rotational Force-Darwin (MRF-D) 20.2 in Darwin, Australia from March to October 2020 as the Logistics Command Element (LCE).
- Participated in Marine Rotational Force-Darwin (MRF-D) 22.2 in Darwin, Australia from March to October 2022 as the Logistics Command Element (LCE).
- Participated in Marine Rotational Force-Darwin (MRF-D) 24.3 in Darwin, Australia from March to October 2024 as the Logistics Command Element (LCE).

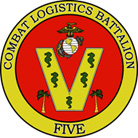
Original logo of CLB-5, used from 2006 to 2009.

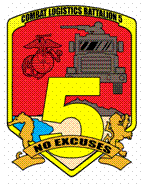
Past logo of CLB-5, used from 2009 to 2015.

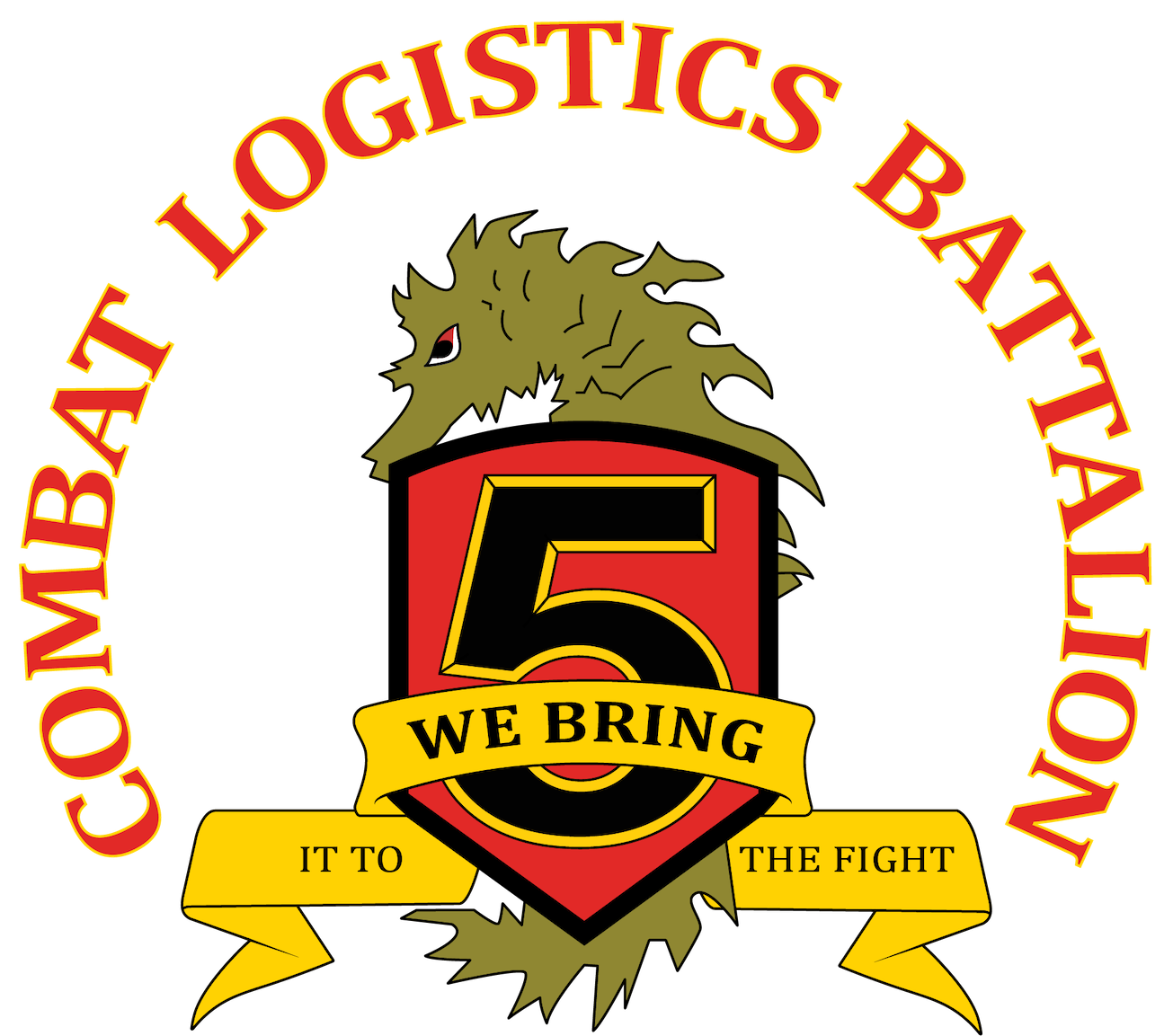
Current logo of CLB-5, circa 2017.

== Unit Awards ==
A unit citation or commendation is an award bestowed upon an organization for the action cited. Members of the unit who participated in said actions are allowed to wear on their uniforms the awarded unit citation. CLB-5 has been presented with the following awards [1]:

- Navy Unit Commendation Streamer with two Bronze Stars
  - Iraq – 2006 – 2007, 2008 - 2009
  - Afghanistan - 2010
- National Defense Service Streamer
  - 2006 - current
- Iraq Campaign Streamer with three Bronze Stars
  - National Resolution 2006 - 2007
  - Iraqi Surge 2007 - 2008
  - Iraqi Sovereignty - 2009
- Afghanistan Campaign Streamer with two Bronze Stars
  - Consolidation III - 2010
  - Transition I - 2012
- Global War on Terrorism Service Streamer
  - 2006 - current

== Previous Commanders ==
- LtCol M.E. Travis
- LtCol Joe L. Jarosz
- LtCol Robert T. Meade
- LtCol Brian W. Ecarius
- LtCol Sam K. Lee
- LtCol Matthew T. James
- LtCol John F. Soto Jr.
- LtCol Shawn A. Meier
- LtCol Rebecca A. Bolz

== Previous Sergeants Major ==
- Sergeant Major Willie T. Ward III
- Sergeant Major Brian E. Cullins
- Sergeant Major Troy E. Black (19th Sergeant Major of the Marine Corps, 5th Senior Enlisted Advisor to the Chairman)
- Sergeant Major Joseph S. Gregory
- Sergeant Major Keith D. Hoge
- Sergeant Major James L. Horr
- Sergeant Major Damian L. Reed
- Sergeant Major David C. Hernandez
- Sergeant Major Salvador Moralessolis
- Sergeant Major Damien W. Blaise (current)

== See also ==
- List of United States Marine Corps battalions
- Organization of the United States Marine Corps
