= Combat Logistics Battalion 1 =

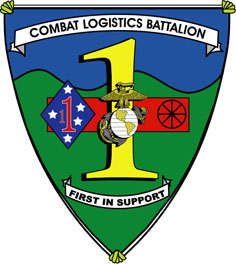
- Combat Logistics Battalion 1 insignia
- Country: United States
- Allegiance: United States of America
- Branch: United States Marine Corps
- Type: Logistics
- Part of: Combat Logistics Regiment 1; 1st Marine Logistics Group
- Garrison/HQ: Marine Corps Base Camp Pendleton
- Motto: "Always Forward"
- Engagements: Operation Desert Storm; Operation Iraqi Freedom * 2003 invasion of Iraq; Operation Enduring Freedom * Operation Moshtarak

Commanders
- Current commander: Lieutenant Colonel Tara Patton
- Sergeant Major: Sergeant Major Christopher M. A. Ivester

Combat Logistics Battalion 1 (CLB 1) is a logistics battalion of the United States Marine Corps. They are part of Combat Logistics Regiment 1 and the 1st Marine Logistics Group. The unit is based out of the Marine Corps Base Camp Pendleton, California.

== Mission ==
To provide logistics support to Regimental Combat Team 1 (RCT-1) beyond its organic capabilities in any environment and throughout the spectrum of conflict in order to allow RCT-1 to continue operations independent of any logistically driven operational pauses.

== Subordinate units ==
- * Headquarters & Service Company
- Transportation Services Company

== History ==
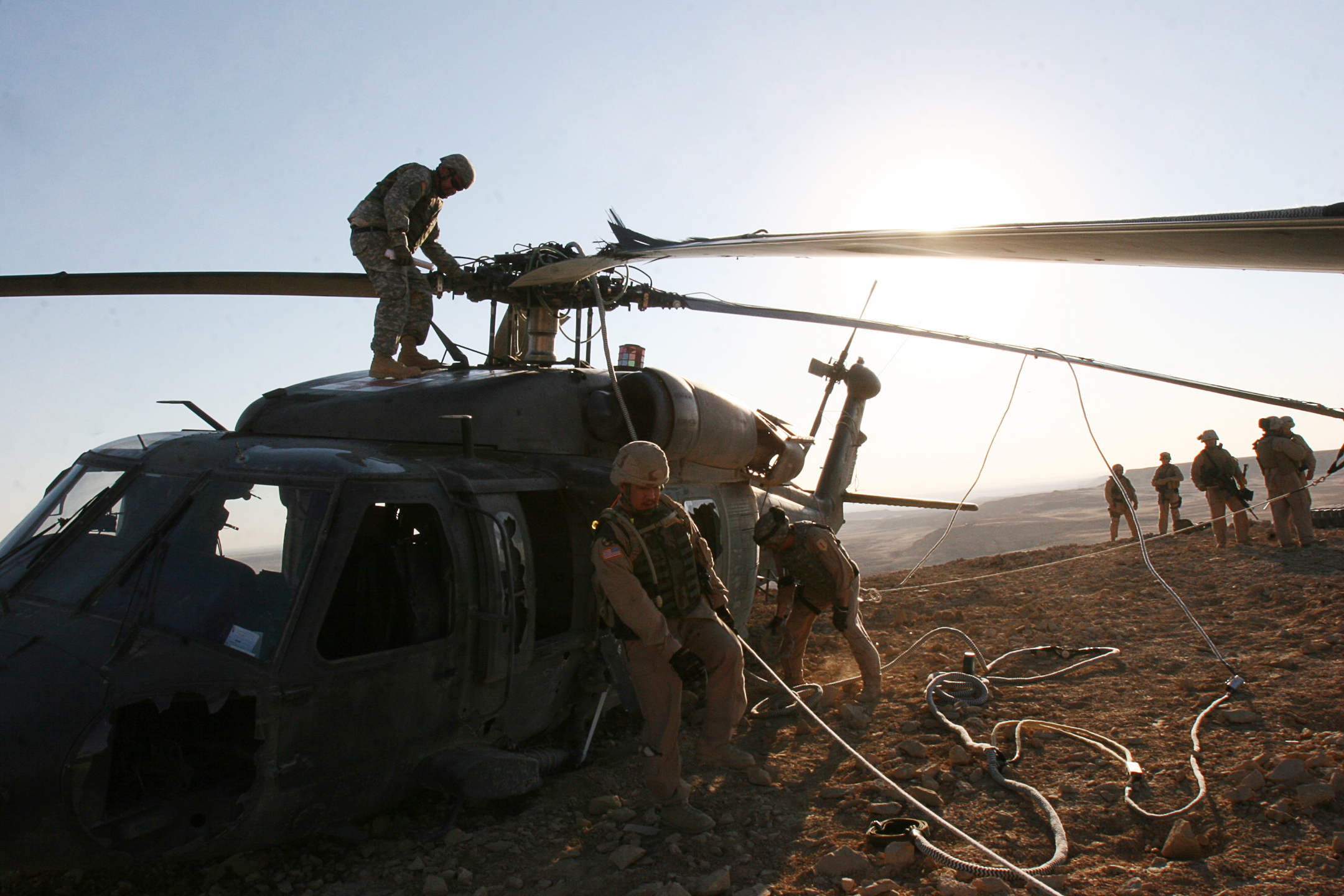
Service members with Helicopter Support Team, Combat Logistics Battalion 1, secure a damaged Black Hawk helicopter while engaged in a helicopter recover mission in Al Anbar Province, Iraq, 2006

From October 2009 through May 2010, CLB-1 deployed to Afghanistan in support of Operation Enduring Freedom. The battalion provided tactical logistics support to Regimental Combat Team 7 during Operation Moshtarak in February 2010, where Marines fought to secure the former Taliban stronghold of Marjah. During the deployment they were also responsible for transportation of supplies to ground units through combat logistics patrols, air delivery and helicopter support teams; improving roads and trafficability for units moving throughout Helmand Province; and maintaining vehicles and equipment that constantly took a beating in the dust-covered rocky Afghanistan terrain.

== See also ==
- List of United States Marine Corps battalions
- Organization of the United States Marine Corps
