= Bradshaw Station =

Former pastoral lease in Northern Territory, Australia

Coordinates: 15.34760°S 130.27607°E

Location in Northern Territory

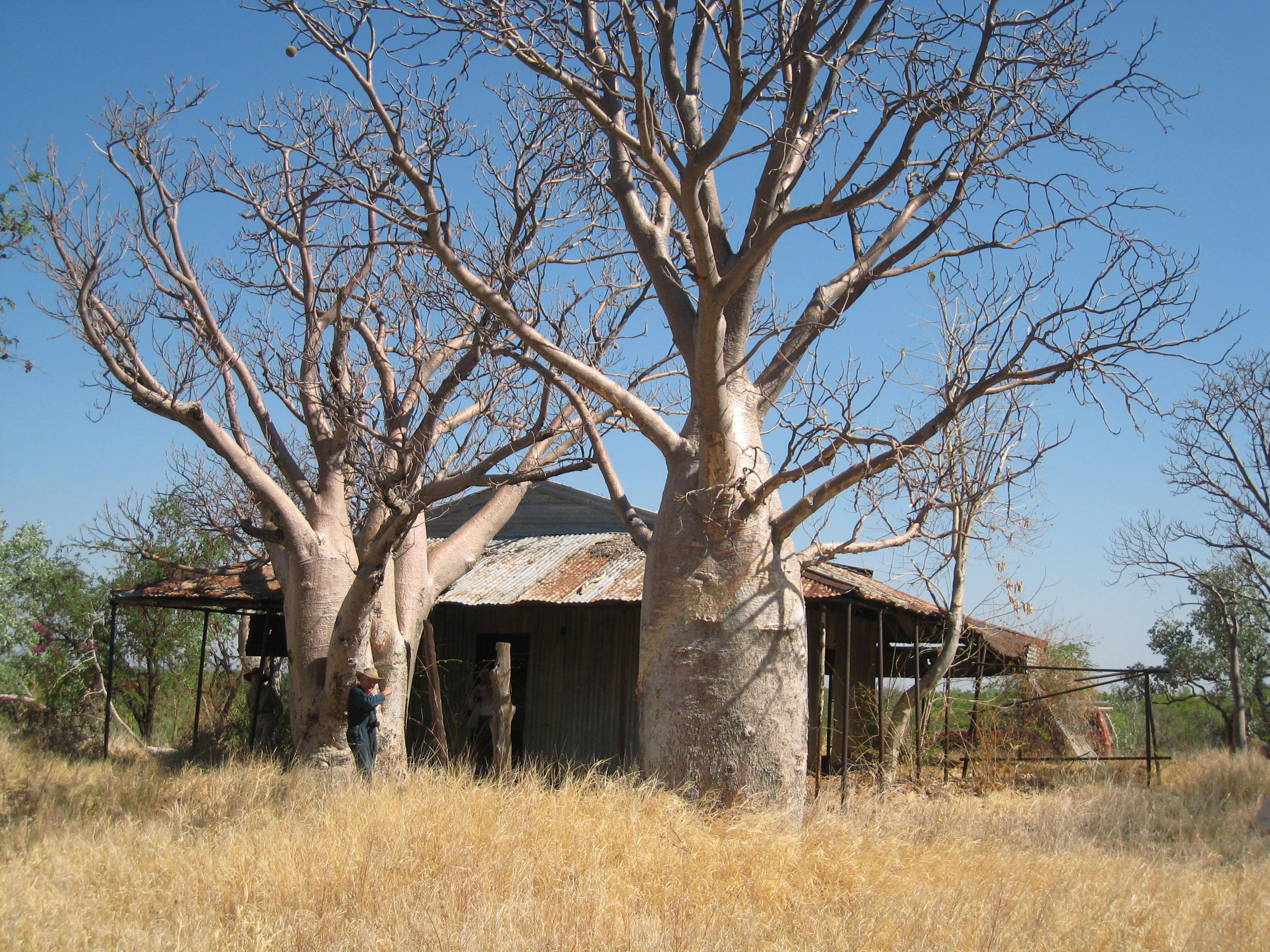
Bradshaw homestead (3rd, built 1905)

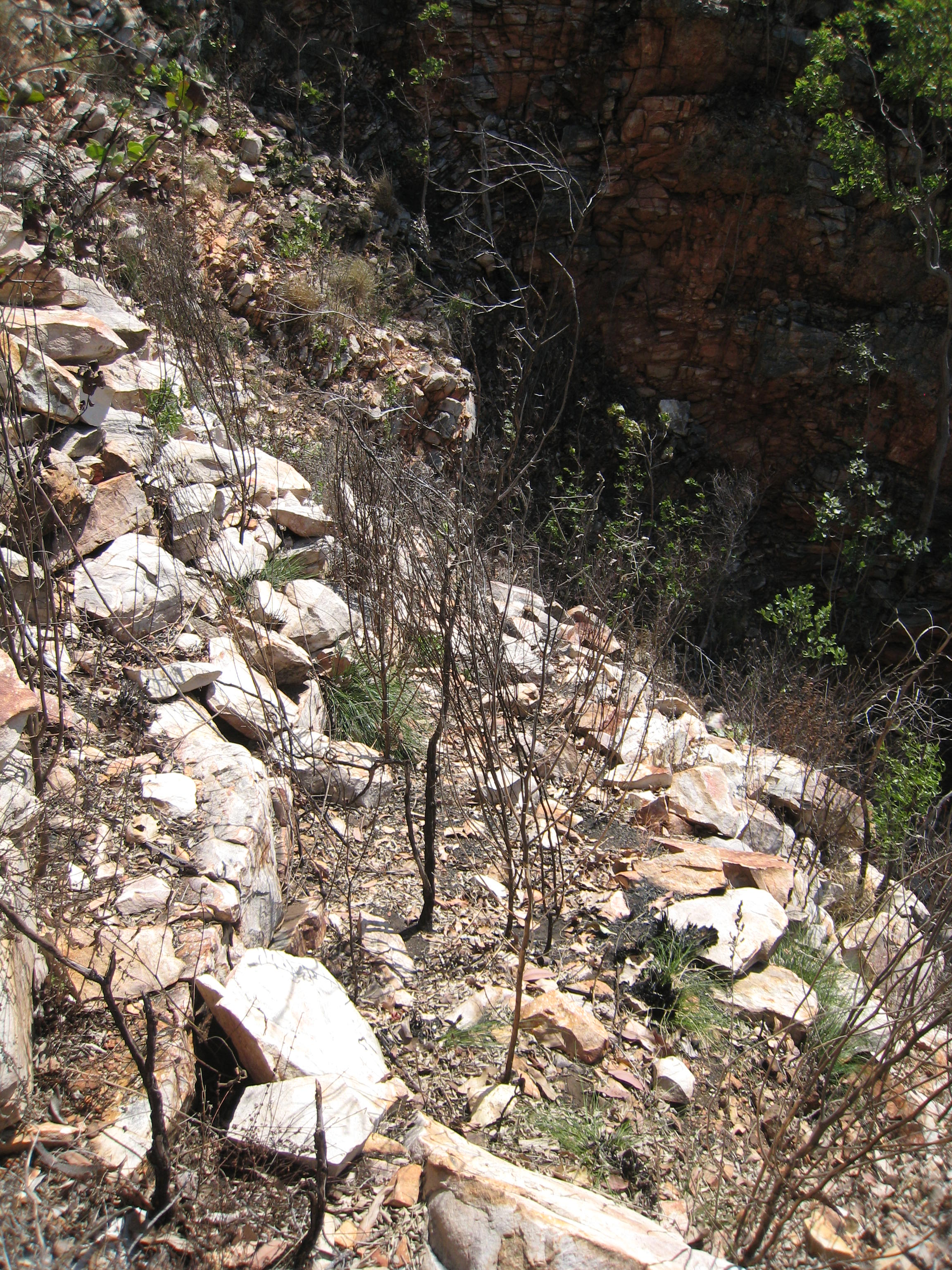
Bradshaw's packhorse cutting (NT heritage listed)

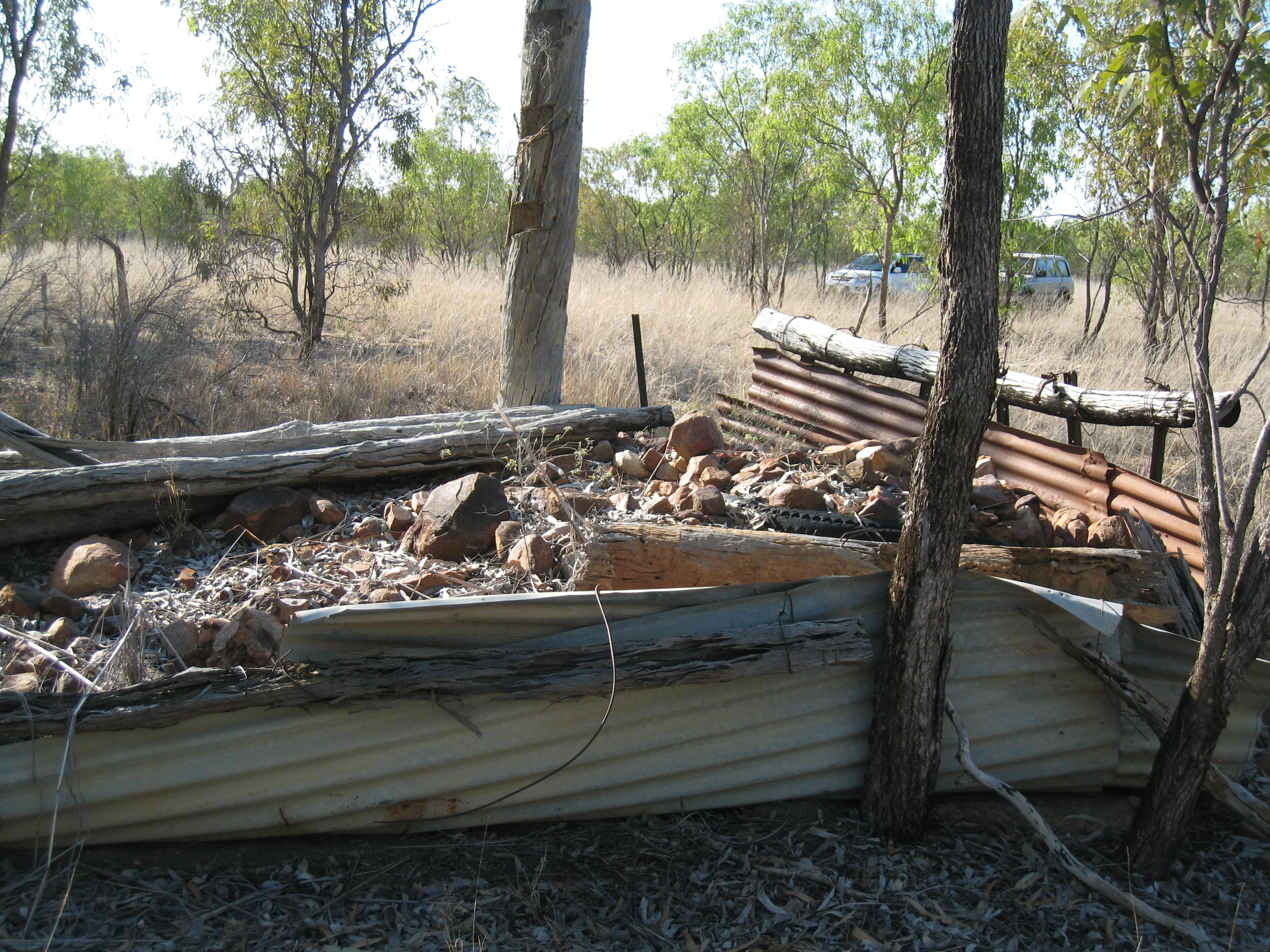
Cattle ramp, Leichhardt yard, Bradshaw Station

Bradshaw Station, most commonly known as Bradshaw's Run, was a pastoral lease that operated as a cattle station in the Northern Territory of Australia.

It is situated about 171 kilometres (106 mi) east of Kununurra and 235 kilometres (146 mi) south west of Katherine.

The leases to lands along the Victoria River were acquired by Joseph Bradshaw in 1894; the property occupied an area of 4,800 square miles (12,432 km^{2}). It is bounded by the Victoria River to the south, Joseph Bonaparte Gulf to the west and the Fitzmaurice River to the north.

A second lease adjacent to the station of 2,000 square miles (5,180 km^{2}) was granted to Frederick Bradshaw, Joseph's brother, in 1898. Frederick joined his brother in 1898 to stock the property with sheep and both leases, which shared a boundary, were being run as one entity.

By 1903 the homestead had been built using Cypress-pine and a herd of 40,000 cattle were supported on the property. Ivan Egoriffe, a Russian, was appointed as station manager at about the same time. Known as Ivan the Terrible he treated Aboriginal workers cruelly and many left the property. Eventually a few returned and tried to assassinate Egoriffe, but instead killed another man. Egoriffe had the man accused of the killing hung outside the homestead. Both Frederick Bradshaw and Egoriffe were murdered by Aborigines near Port Keats in 1905 when two men boarded their ship and killed them along with five of their companions in a revenge attack.

The bodies of the men were buried on the run atop an escarpment known as The Tombs. Joseph Bradshaw spent his last years on the property, which entered a period of decline and was deserted by his backers. He hired another manager, named Byres, who replaced the old homestead, which had become riddled with termites.

The property was acquired by Patrick Quilty, the son of Tom Quilty, in 1937. Quilty Snr. owned Glenore Station and Euroka Springs Station, both of which were passed onto his sons. Prior to his death in 1938 Patrick Quilty and his brother Tom acquired Bradshaw, Coolibah and Bedford Downs Station.

Much of the property was acquired by the Department of Defence in 1995 to form the Bradshaw Field Training Area used by the Australian Army and the US Army. The training area occupies an area of 8,500 square kilometres (3,282 sq mi).

== See also ==
- List of ranches and stations
