= Operation Randolph Glen =

Part of the Vietnam War (1969–1970)

- Part of the Vietnam War
Date	7 December 1969 – 31 March 1970
Location	Thừa Thiên Province, South Vietnam

Belligerents
United States; South Vietnam	North Vietnam

Commanders and leaders
John M. Wright	

Units involved
(United States) 2nd Brigade, 101st Airborne Division (South Vietnam) 1st Infantry Division	

Casualties and losses
(United States) 123 killed 4 missing	US body count: 670 killed

Operation Randolph Glen was a joint U.S. Army and Army of the Republic of Vietnam (ARVN) military operation during the Vietnam War designed to keep pressure on the People's Army of Vietnam (PAVN) units in Thừa Thiên Province and prevent them from mounting any attacks on the populated coastal regions.

== Background ==
The 101st Airborne Division in cooperation with the ARVN 1st Infantry Division conducted operations to locate and engage PAVN and Vietcong (VC) units and interdict supply lines into the populated lowlands of Thừa Thiên Province. Limited objective airmobile operations were mounted to engage PAVN forces in the piedmont area including periodic interdiction of the A Sầu Valley. The operations were planned to maximise population security and support the achievement of pacification objectives.

In the ARVN 1st Division's reconnaissance zone along the Laotian border including all of western Quảng Trị Province extensive reconnaissance was conducted to monitor PAVN cross-border activities. The principal intelligence units involved were the 2nd Squadron, 17th Cavalry Regiment conducting armed aerial reconnaissance supported on the ground by Company L, 75th Ranger Regiment.

== Operation ==
The operation commenced with extensive reconnaissance-in-force, search and ambush operations to engage PAVN/VC forces and locate caches and base camps. At 19:30 on 9 December the 3rd Brigade's provisional air cavalry platoon 2.5km north of Firebase Sword (16.553°N 107.271°E) received 17 mortar rounds on their position and called in artillery support in response. On 11 December the 2nd Battalion, 506th Infantry Regiment and the ARVN 54th Regiment air assaulted from Camp Evans into multiple landing zones near Firebase O'Reilly to conduct reconnaissance operations. That night Company D, 2nd Battalion, 327th Infantry Regiment ambushed a PAVN unit killing three and capturing three AK-47s.

On 14 December 3rd Platoon, Company B, 2/506th engaged a PAVN force killing two PAVN and capturing two weapons, U.S. losses were two killed. On 17 December Companies A and C, 3rd Battalion, 187th Infantry Regiment assisted the ARVN 156th and 185th Regional Force (RF) Companies in a village cordon and search which resulted in seven suspected VC being detained. On 19 December Company C, 2/327th engaged two VC and in a sweep of the area found four dead VC and recovered four weapons. In the early morning of 21 December Company C, 3/187th engaged 30 VC with small arms and then called in aerial rocket artillery and AC-119 gunship support killing three PAVN and capturing three and two AK-47s. On the morning of 24 December 3rd Platoon, Company D, 1/327th was ambushed 6km south of Firebase Tomahawk losing one killed.

A Christmas ceasefire came into effect at 18:00 on 24 December, however at 14:00 on 25 December an OH-6A reconnaissance helicopter from the air cavalry platoon received small-arms fire from three PAVN/VC. The helicopter returned fire and aerial rocket fire was also used following which the aerorifle platoon was landed to investigate the contact, they found six dead PAVN/VC and captured one wounded prisoner and four AK-47s. The 1st Platoon, Company D, 1/327th located graves containing 18 VC recently killed by small-arms fire.

On 27 December Companies C and D, 3/187th conducted a cordon and search of Phong An hamlet with the 156th, 185th and 222nd RF Companies which resulted in 8 suspected VC being detained. On the afternoon of 31 December Company C, 1/327th engaged three PAVN, pursuing the escaping PAVN the unit found one PAVN killed, two AK-47s, two graves of PAVN recently killed by small arms fire and three bunkers. At 18:00 all units stood down for the New Year ceasefire.

On 3 January an OH-6 and two AH-1G helicopter gunships from Troop A, 2/17th Cavalry received heavy automatic weapons fire. The gunships engaged the attackers killing 17 PAVN/VC while airstrikes killed a further two. On 3 and 4 January a battery of 105mm howitzers guarded by Company D, 2/502nd were moved to reopen Firebase Thor (16.12°N 107.488°E) to engage targets with artillery fire. From 8–10 January Brigade units assisted in cordon and search operations in Phú Lộc and Phong Điền Districts.

On the morning of 14 January while supporting United States Marine Corps reconnaissance operations a UH-1H helicopter from Troop F, 2/17th Cavalry was hit by small arms fire and crashed with four U.S. personnel killed. On 16 January Company D, 2/506th air assaulted from Camp Evans to reopen Firebase Shepherd to provide security for the deployment of six 105 mm and two 155 mm howitzers to conduct an artillery raid against pre-planned targets. On 17 January Company D returned to Camp Evans.

On 18 January the 2nd Brigade conducted a four battalion air assault into the area west of Firebase Bastogne to search for PAVN/VC forces, base areas and supply caches. On the afternoon of the 25th an OH-6A from Troop B, 2/17th Cavalry located a suspected base area and directed airstrikes against it resulting in 16 PAVN killed. On 27 January the forces engaged in the search were repositioned to prepare for any PAVN/VC attacks on populated areas during the Tết period.

On the evening of 27 January a unit from Company A, 3/187th assisting a security mission in Phong Điền District observed three PAVN. The command and control UH-1H illuminated the area with its landing lights and was hit by PAVN fire and crashed killing the battalion artillery liaison officer. A sweep of the area found two dead PAVN and captured one and three individual and one crew-served weapon.

On the morning of 1 February AH-1Gs from Troop A, 2/17th Cavalry engaged five PAVN killing four. Later that morning gunships found three more PAVN at the same location and killed two of them. The Tết ceasefire began at 18:00 on 5 February. On the morning of 7 February Company A, 2/501st received small arms and Rocket-propelled grenade (RPG) fire and aerial rocket artillery fire was called in to suppress the fire. The Company then received mortar and sniper fire. Two PAVN were killed during the engagement. On 10 February a squad from Company B, 2/327th ambushed nine PAVN, killing three and capturing three AK-47s.

At 01:00 on 11 February the headquarters of 2/502nd the ARVN 4/54th at Firebase Rifle (16.256°N 107.686°E) was hit by mortar fire followed by a sapper attack. The base defenders responded with small arms and artillery fire and aerial rocket artillery fire was called in. The attack killed eight U.S. and one ARVN. A search of the perimeter in the morning found 12 PAVN dead, five AK-47s, one pistol and two RPG-2 launchers.

On the afternoon of 14 February the Reconnaissance Platoon of 2/506th received RPG fire from a PAVN squad. The platoon returned fire and later found five PAVN dead and three AK-47s. That evening gunships from Troop A, 2/17th Cavalry killed six PAVN. On 16 February Companies A, B and D 1/501st moved from Firebase Birmingham to open Firebase Spear (16.20°N 107.505°E). Company D provided security for the base while the other two companies patrolled in the vicinity. Company A, 1/502nd reopened Firebase Normandy (16.284°N 107.513°E). On 22 February a Ranger team from Company L, 75th Rangers received small arms fire from a force of 14 PAVN, the Rangers returned fire killing 6 PAVN. On 26 February Troop A, 2/17th Cavalry fired on seven VC at a cave entrance killing six.

On 2 March an OH-6A received ground fire killing the pilot and wounding the observer who took control of the helicopter which he crash-landed at Camp Sally. On 4 March 2nd Platoon, Company B, 1/506th found five PAVN/VC graves and then located a further six graves. On 8 March 3rd Platoon, Company B, 2/327th and the 176th RF Company found VC, three rallied to the patrol and they convinced the remaining two to surrender.

On 10 March 3rd Platoon, Company A, 1/506th received small arms and RPG fire from a PAVN/VC company losing six killed. Artillery fire was called in and a sweep conducted of the area with no results. Later that day a Ranger team engaged a PAVN squad killing four. On 12 March gunships from 2/17th Cavalry killed 11 PAVN in two engagements.

On 14 March Firebase Pistol (16.177°N 107.709°E) was opened to support operations into the Ruong Ruong and Huu Trach Vallies. The 2/502nd and ARVN 2/54th assaulted into the Ruong Ruong Valley to conduct reconnaissance in force operations. At 19:45 2nd Platoon, Company C, 2/506th engaged 8 PAVN, a sweep the next morning found two AK-47s and one RPG launcher.

At 02:13 on 20 March a sapper was shot on the northern perimeter of Firebase Granite, defended by Company C, 1/506th. A PAVN/VC force then attacked the firebase from the south supported by mortar, RPG and small arms fire. The defenders responded with small arms and called in artillery fire. A sweep of the perimeter at dawn found 16 PAVN dead, five AK-47s and four RPG launchers. U.S. losses were 10 killed.

On 24 March Troop A, 2/17th Cavalry gunships killed four PAVN. On 27 March a Troop B, 2/17th Cavalry OH-6A received heavy machine gun fire. Artillery and airstrikes were called in resulting in 21 PAVN killed and one 12.7mm machine gun destroyed. On 28 March AH-1Gs from 2/17th Cavalry attacked a bunker complex killing 16 PAVN.

On 29 March Firebase Granite was closed and Firebase Gladiator (16.461°N 107.258°E) was opened.

== Aftermath ==
The operation concluded on 31 March with the participating units assigned to Operation Texas Star. The results of the operation were 668 PAVN/VC killed, 19 captured and 6 Chieu Hoi and 323 individual and 35 crew-served weapons captured. U.S. losses were 123 killed and 4 missing.
