= Operation Carentan =

1968 operation of the Vietnam War

- Part of the Vietnam War
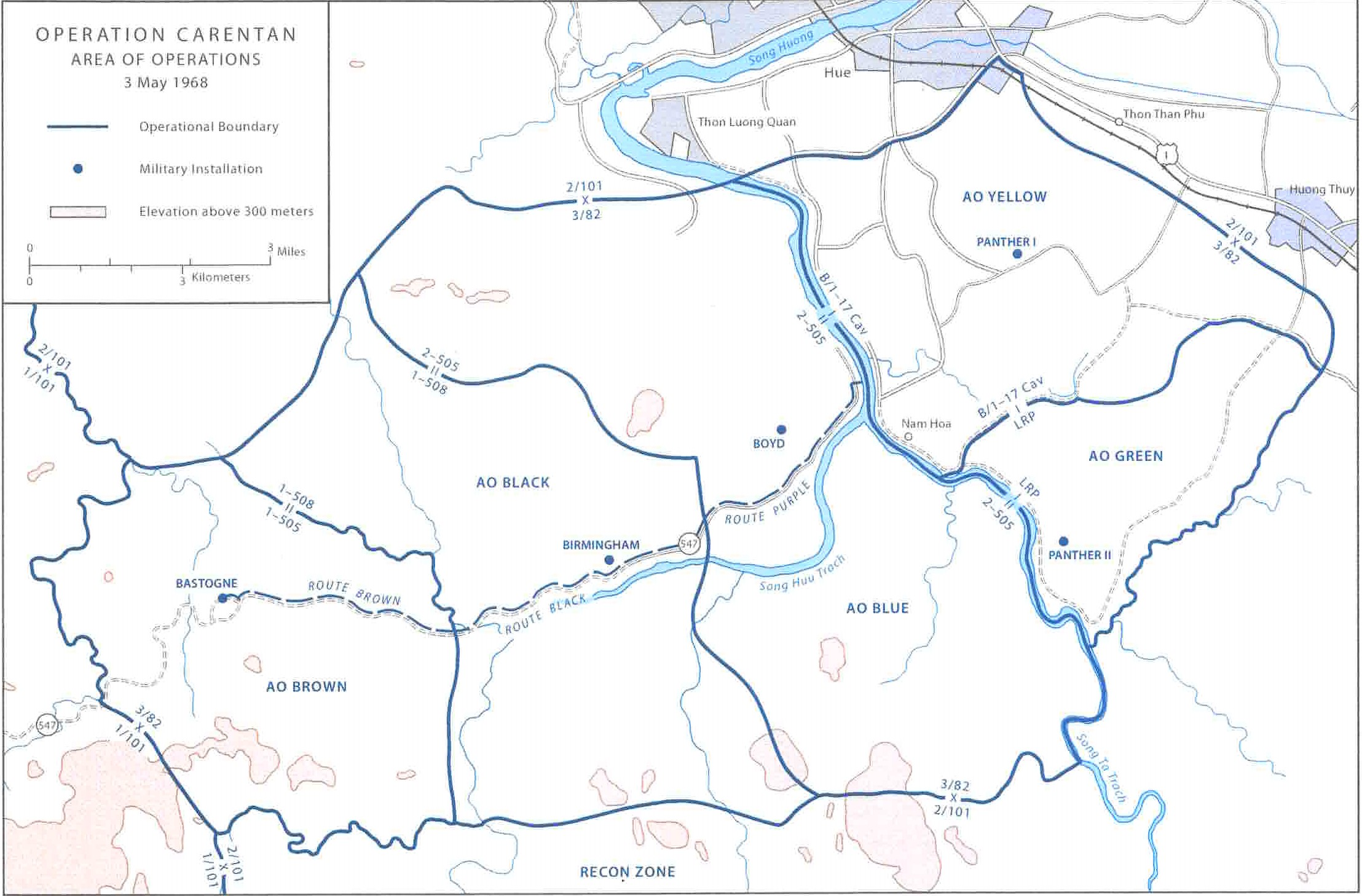
- Operation Carentan, 3 May 1968
Date	18 March – 17 May 1968
Location	Thừa Thiên Province, South Vietnam
Result	US operational success

Belligerents
United States; South Vietnam	North Vietnam

Commanders and leaders
MG Olinto M. Barsanti	

Units involved
(United States) 1st Brigade, 101st Airborne Division; 2nd Brigade, 101st Airborne Division; 3rd Brigade, 82nd Airborne Division (South Vietnam) 1st Division	29th Regiment, 325C Division

Casualties and losses
(United States) 214 killed	US body count: 2,320 killed 157 suspects detained 488 individual and 93 crew-served weapons recovered

Operation Carentan and Operation Carentan II were security operations conducted during the Vietnam War by the U.S. 1st and 2nd Brigades, 101st Airborne Division and the 3rd Brigade, 82nd Airborne Division in Thừa Thiên Province, South Vietnam from 18 March to 17 May 1968.

== Background ==
Following the conclusion of the Battle of Huế, Lieutenant general William B. Rosson, the I Field Force commander ordered Major general Olinto M. Barsanti, commander of the 101st Airborne Division to deploy the 2nd Brigade, 101st Airborne Division and the newly deployed 3rd Brigade, 82nd Airborne Division to take over the Jeb Stuart operational area from the 1st Cavalry Division as it prepared for Operation Pegasus, the relief of Khe Sanh Combat Base.

== Operation ==
=== Operation Carentan I ===
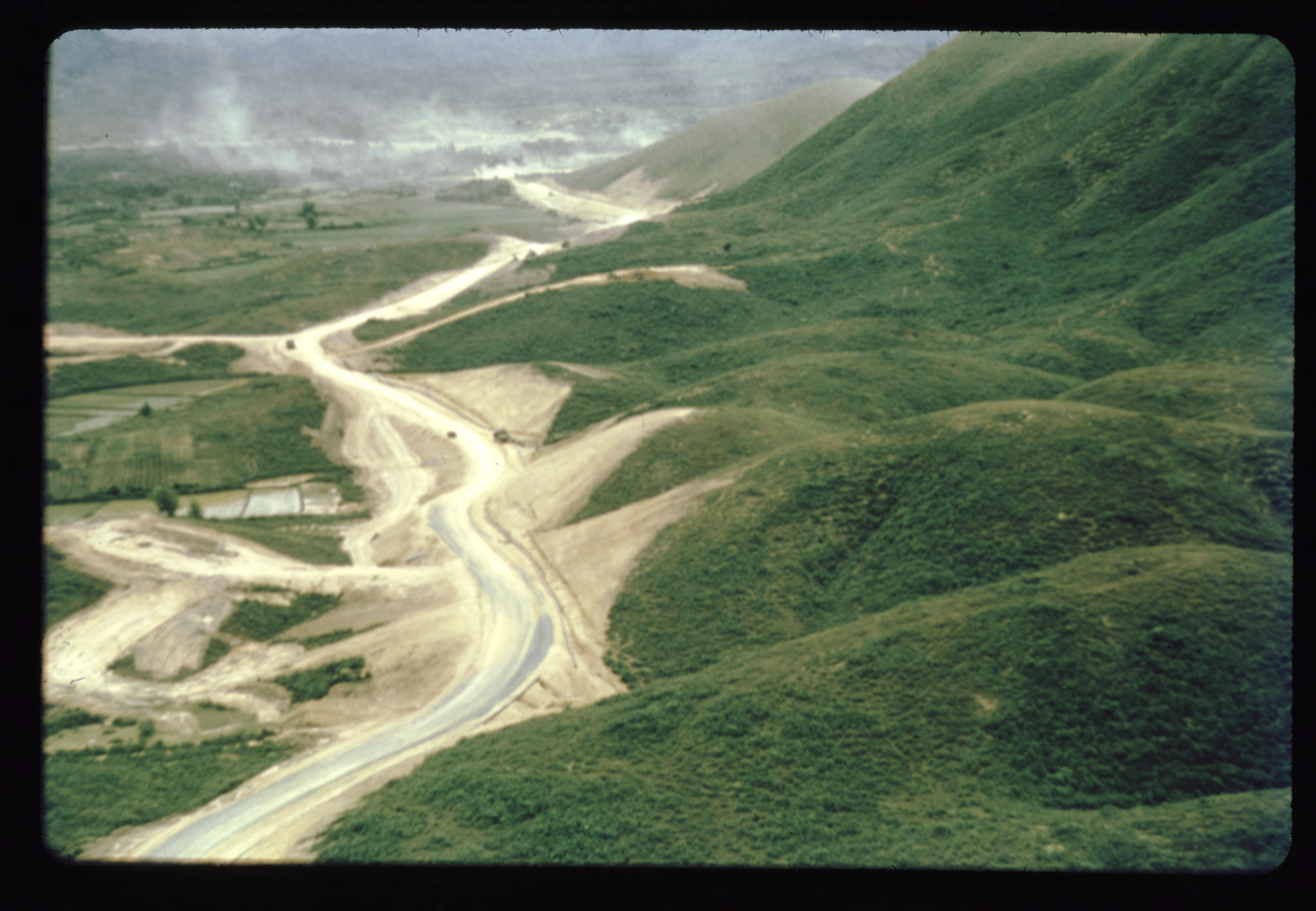
Route 547, 15 July 1968

The initial phase of the operations called for the 2nd Brigade, 101st and the 3rd Brigade, 82nd to secure Highway 1 between Landing Zone El Paso and PK-17 and then to secure Highway 547 which headed west from the city of Huế towards the A Shau Valley.

On 18 March the 1st Brigade, 101st Airborne Division established a command post at Firebase Birmingham, 10 km southwest of Huế overlooking Route 547. The following day, the 2nd Battalion, 327th Infantry Regiment was sent further west on Route 547 to seize an old French fort, while the 1st Battalion, 327th Infantry, advanced along the northern side of Route 547, and the 2nd Battalion, 502nd Infantry Regiment, screened the southern side of the road. These moves were unopposed and engineers began building Firebase Henry (16.349°N 107.516°E) near the French fort.

The 1st Brigade continued moving west along Route 547 and on 21 March 8 km west of Firebase Henry Company C 1/327th Infantry, ran into a small PAVN outpost on the north side of the road. After overrunning that position, Company C then found a larger group of bunkers. Company A moved to join Company C and they overran the position, losing six killed and 20 wounded. Several hundred meters further west they encountered more PAVN bunkers and this time their assault was repulsed for the loss of six killed and 52 wounded. The units were withdrawn so that air and artillery support could be brought in. When the assault resumed the next morning the PAVN had abandoned their positions. As the U.S. forces continued their advance they encountered small groups of PAVN who would usually abandon their positions rather than stand and fight.

Barsanti ordered the 2nd Brigade, 101st Airborne to search the foothills west of Huế, that held the PAVN's Base Area 114. On 22 March, the 2nd Battalion, 501st Infantry Regiment and the 1st Battalion, 502nd Infantry Regiment deployed into Base Area 114. Over the next few weeks 35 U.S. soldiers were killed in firefights with the PAVN, while a misplaced artillery barrage killed 11 more. PAVN losses were 175 killed.

On 27 March the 1st Brigade established Firebase Bastogne which became the brigade's forward operating base. More than 20 artillery pieces were soon in place putting the A Sầu Valley within artillery range.

=== Operation Carentan II ===
On 1 April Operation Carentan II commenced in the same general area.

On 3 April a UH-1H medevac helicopter (serial number: 66–17043) from the 498th Medical Company, 55th Medical Group, 44th Medical Brigade was shot down while evacuating casualties. A small unit from the 502nd Infantry Regiment reached the crash site rescuing three survivors, while the dead crew chief's body was only located several weeks later.

On 29 April the Army of the Republic of Vietnam (ARVN) Hac Bao (Black Panther) reconnaissance company of the 1st Division made contact with a PAVN force in a hamlet 4 miles (6.4 km) northwest of Huế. They exchanged small arms fire until elements of the 2nd Brigade, 101st Airborne arrived and cordoned off the area blocking escape routes. Artillery, airstrikes and helicopter gunships then attacked the hamlet and ARVN forces then swept the hamlet until contact was lost at dusk. PAVN losses were 352 killed while ARVN losses were eight killed.

On 1 May elements of the 101st Airborne's cavalry unit engaged a PAVN platoon 10 miles (16 km) northwest of Huế, the PAVN withdrew into a bunker complex which was then targeted by artillery, airstrikes and helicopter gunships until contact was lost at 19:45. PAVN losses were 82 killed for US losses of one killed.

On 5 May 3rd Brigade, 82nd Airborne engaged a PAVN force 11 miles (18 km) southwest of Huế until contact was lost at 16:00. PAVN losses were 82 killed for US losses of eight killed.

Carentan II ended on 17 May 1968, US losses were 156 killed, while PAVN/VC losses were 2,096 killed and 157 suspects detained and 488 individual and 93 crew-served weapons captured.

== Aftermath ==
Cumulative U.S. losses were 214 killed, while PAVN losses were 2,320 killed.

As Operation Carentan II progressed U.S. and ARVN forces launched Operation Delaware into the A Sầu Valley.
