= Operation Clinch Valley =

Part of the Vietnam War (1970)

- Part of the Vietnam War
Date	9 – 15 July 1970
Location	Khe Sanh plateau, South Vietnam

Belligerents
United States; South Vietnam	North Vietnam

Commanders and leaders
(United States) John J. Hennessey; Sidney Bryan Berry (South Vietnam) Ngô Quang Trưởng	

Units involved
(United States) 1st Brigade, 101st Airborne Division (South Vietnam) 3rd Regiment, 1st Infantry Division	9th Regiment

Casualties and losses
	US body count: 266 killed

Operation Clinch Valley was a joint U.S. Army and Army of the Republic of Vietnam (ARVN) military operation during the Vietnam War to engage People's Army of Vietnam (PAVN) units on the Khe Sanh plateau and prevent them from reinforcing PAVN units in the A Sầu Valley.

== Background ==
U.S. forces launched Operation Texas Star on 1 April to establish firebases east of the A Sầu Valley. U.S. intelligence indicated that the PAVN 9th Regiment, 304th Division, was infiltrating into South Vietnam to reinforce or replace the weakened PAVN 66th Regiment in the northwest portion of the 101st Airborne Division's area of operations.

On the afternoon of 6 July a Ranger team from the 101st Airborne Division operating 13 km northwest of Khe Sanh engaged a PAVN infiltration group. Supported by artillery and helicopter gunships the team killed 10 PAVN. Five U.S. were wounded in the action. On 8 July 4km southwest of Khe Sanh, elements of Troop A, 2nd Squadron, 17th Cavalry Regiment observed and engaged a PAVN force estimated at 250 soldiers. Aerial rocketry was brought to bear, and Troop D was landed, engaging the PAVN to the west. The 8-hour long battle ended at 19:30 with 139 PAVN killed and four captured, U.S. losses were four killed. Initial interrogation established that the units involved were the 1st and 2nd Battalions, 9th Regiment.

== Operation ==
The operation began with elements of the 3rd Brigade and the ARVN 3rd Regiment and B Company, 2nd Battalion, 502nd Infantry Regiment, moving by air from Firebase Birmingham to Mai Loc Camp and then conducting an air assault to reopen Firebase Shepherd. On 10 July the ARVN 1st and 2nd Battalions, 3rd Regiment assaulted into Firebases Snapper (16.587°N 106.701°E) and Smith (16.622°N 106.673°E) and the 3rd Regiment command post moved by air to Firebase Shepherd. On 11 July near the scene of the 8 July engagement elements of the ARVN 3rd Regiment found the bodies of 143 PAVN killed by airstrikes 24-hours earlier. Nearby on 12 July elements of the same battalion engaged an estimated 40 PAVN. A search of the area revealed 14 PAVN bodies and 36 graves believed to have been there 24 to 48 hours. In the two week period ending 12 July, a total of 394 PAVN soldiers from the 9th Regiment were killed in that area.

Also on 12 July elements of the ARVN 3rd Regiment discovered 65 PAVN bodies killed by air strikes 24-hours earlier. On 24 July the ARVN 2nd Regiment found a PAVN base camp with 53 bodies killed by airstrikes approximately two weeks earlier.

== Aftermath ==
The operation was terminated at 18:00 on 15 July. PAVN losses were 266 killed; no U.S. or ARVN were killed.
