= Battle of Phú Lộc =

Part of the Vietnam War (1974)

- Part of the Vietnam War
Date	28 August – 10 December 1974
Location	Phú Lộc, Thừa Thiên, South Vietnam 16.30°N 107.718°E
Result	South Vietnamese victory

Belligerents
North Vietnam	South Vietnam

Commanders and leaders
	General Ngô Quang Trưởng; General Lâm Quang Thi; MGen Nguyen Van Diem

Units involved
6th Regiment; 271st Independent Regiment; 803rd Regiment; 812th Regiment; 78th Artillery Regiment	3rd Infantry Regiment; 51st Infantry Regiment; 15th Ranger Group

Casualties and losses
unknown	PAVN claims: 2,500 killed, wounded or captured

The Battle of Phú Lộc took place from 28 August to 10 December 1974 when North Vietnamese forces captured a series of hills and installed artillery that closed Phu Bai Air Base and interdicted Highway 1. The hills were recaptured by the South Vietnamese in costly fighting that depleted its reserve forces.

== Background ==
The Hải Vân Ridge formed the Thừa Thiên-Quảng Nam Province boundary from the sea to Bạch Mã Mountain, which was occupied by the People's Army of Vietnam (PAVN) in October 1973. The ridge continued west past Bạch Mã until it descended into the valley of the Sông Tả Trạch at Ruong Ruong, where the PAVN had established a forward operating base. Local Route 545 twisted through the mountains north from Ruong Ruong (16.177°N 107.718°E), joining Highway 1 just south of Phu Bai. As it crossed over the western slopes of the Hải Vân Ridge, Route 545 passed between two lower hills, Núi Mô Tau (16.307°N 107.66°E) on the west and Núi Bong (16.286°N 107.742°E) on the east. Núi Mô Tau and Núi Bong were only about 300 meters and 140 meters high, respectively, but the Army of the Republic of Vietnam (ARVN) positions on them, and on neighboring hills, formed the main outer ring protecting Phu Bai and Huế from the south. Outposts were placed on hills 2,000 to 5,000 meters farther south, including hills as identified by their elevations of 144 (16.284°N 107.68°E), 224 (16.275°N 107.747°E), 273 (16.26°N 107.73°E) and 350 meters (16.256°N 107.757°E).

At first, the I Corps commander, General Ngô Quang Trưởng, viewed the see-saw contest for the hills south of Núi Mô Tau as hardly more than training exercises and of no lasting tactical or strategic importance. That assessment was supportable so long as the PAVN was unable to extend his positions to within range of Phu Bai. Once this extension occurred, protecting Huế's vital air and land links with the south became matter of great urgency.

During inconclusive engagements in the spring of 1974, the ARVN 1st Division managed to hold on to Núi Mô Tau and Núi Bong, losing Hill 144 between the two, but regaining it on 7 April. Hills 273 and 350 were lost; then Hill 350 was recaptured by the 3rd Battalion, 3rd Infantry, in a night attack on 4 June. By this time, I Corps units were restricted by reductions in artillery ammunition. Tight restrictions had been imposed by Trưởng on the number of rounds that could be fired in counterbattery, preparatory, and defensive fires. These conditions compelled the infantry commanders to seek means other than heavy artillery fires to soften objectives before the assault. In recapturing Hill 350, the 3rd Infantry worked around behind the hill and blocked the PAVN's access to defenses on the hill. Within a few days, PAVN soldiers on the hill were out of food and low on ammunition. When the ARVN commander, monitoring the PAVN's tactical radio net, learned this, he ordered the assault. No artillery was used; mortars and grenades provided the only fire support for the ARVN infantrymen, but they took the hill on the first assault even though the PAVN defenders fired a heavy concentration of Tear gas against them. ARVN casualties were light while the PAVN 5th Regiment lost heavily in men and weapons.

As the ARVN 1st Division pressed southward against the PAVN 324B Division's battalions trying to hold hard-won outposts in the hills, another new PAVN corps headquarters was organized north of the Hải Vân Pass and placed in command of the 304th, 324B and 325th Divisions. Designated the 2nd Corps, it was a companion to the new 1st Corps in Thanh Hóa Province of North Vietnam, the 3rd Corps south of the Hải Vân and the 301st Corps near Saigon. In the Thừa Thiên campaign, the 324B Division eventually assumed control of five regiments: its own 803rd and 812th and three independent PAVN infantry regiments, the 5th, 6th, and 271st.

In early June 1974, after releasing the 1st Airborne Brigade to the reserve controlled by the Joint General Staff, Trưởng made major adjustments in command and deployments north of the Hải Vân Pass. The Marine Division was extended to cover about 10 km (6.2 mi) of Thừa Thiên Province and was reinforced with the 15th Ranger Group of three battalions and the 1st Armored Brigade and had operational control of Quảng Trị Province's seven Regional Force (RF) battalions. The division commander, Brigadier General Bui The Lan, positioned his forces with the 258th Marine Brigade, with one M48 tank company attached, defending from the sea southwest to about 5 km (3.1 mi) east of Quảng Trị. The 369th Marine Brigade held the center sector, Quảng Trị city and Highway 1. Southwest of the 369th was the attached 15th Ranger Group along the Thạch Hãn River and the 147th Marine Brigade was on the left and south of the 15th Rangers. When he had to extend his forces southward to cover the airborne sector, Lan used a task force of the 1st Armored Brigade, two Marine battalions, and an RF battalion, keeping three tank companies on the approaches to Huế. The Airborne Division retained the responsibility for the Song Be approach, placing its two remaining brigades, the 2nd and 3rd, to the west. The 2nd Brigade had two RF battalions and one company of M41 tanks attached. The PAVN 4th Regiment was the principal unit in the 2nd Brigade's sector, while the 271st Regiment opposed the 3rd Airborne Brigade to the south near Firebase Bastogne. The four regiments and two attached RF battalions of the 1st Infantry Division were deployed in a long arc from the Airborne Division's left through the hills to Phú Lộc District, with the 54th Infantry Regiment protecting Highway 1 from the Truoi Bridge, just north of Núi Bong, to the Hải Vân Pass.

Hills 144, 273, 224, 350 and Núi Bong, and Núi Mô Tau, overlooking the lines of communication through Phú Lộc District and providing observation and artillery sites in range of Phu Bai, were generally along the boundary between Phú Lộc and Nam Hoa Districts of Thừa Thiên Province. Having recaptured Hill 350 on 4 June, the ARVN 1st Division continued the attack toward Hill 273. A fresh battalion, the 1st Battalion, 54th Infantry, took the hill on 27 June, incurring light casualties and by the next day, the 1st Division controlled all of the important high ground south of Phu Bai.

On 29 June Trưởng directed his deputy north of the Hải Vân Pass, General Lâm Quang Thi, to constitute a regimental reserve for the expected PAVN counterattacks against the newly won hills. Thi accordingly replaced the 54th Infantry with the 3rd Infantry on July, the 54th becoming the corps reserve north of the Hải Vân. Trưởng had good reason to be concerned as the PAVN were preparing for increased and prolonged operations in Thừa Thiên Province, as revealed by aerial photography of PAVN rear areas on 30 June. A 150,000 gallon fuel tank farm, connected to the pipeline through the A Sầu Valley, was photographed under construction in far western Quảng Nam Province, only 25 km (16 mi) south of the PAVN base in Ruong Ruong. The Ruong Ruong region, also called the Nam Dong Secret Zone, was seen growing in logistic capacity. Local Routes 593 and 545 were shown to be repaired and in use, and a tank park and two new truck parks were discernable.

The 324B Division took a while to get organized for renewed attacks in southern Thừa Thiên. Its battalions had taken severe beatings, and a period of re-equipping was necessary. In the meantime, action shifted to the old Airborne Brigade sector in northern Thừa Thiên where the 6th and 8th Marine Battalions, attached to the 147th Brigade, came under heavy attack. Attacks continued through July, and some Marine outposts, targets for 130 mm gunfire, had to be given up. No important changes in dispositions took place, however. Mid-July passed in southern Thừa Thiên without much activity. But on 25 July, as the 2nd Infantry Regiment, 3rd Division, was trying to regroup following a devastating engagement in the Battle of Duc Duc, Trưởng ordered the 54th Infantry from Thừa Thiên to Quảng Nam for attachment to the 3rd Division. The 1st Division, with only three regiments, was left with a 60 km (37 mi) front including Highway 1 and no reserve north of the Hải Vân Pass. Since this situation was hazardous, on 3 August Trưởng ordered Thi to reconstitute a reserve using the 15th Ranger Group, at that time attached to the Marine Division on the Thạch Hãn River.

On 5 August the 121st RF Battalion replaced the 60th Ranger Battalion on the Quảng Trị front. Shortly afterward the 61st and 94th Ranger Battalions pulled out, relieved respectively by the 126th RF Battalion and the 5th Marine Battalion. But events in Quảng Nam forced Trưởng to change his plans for the 15th Group; because Thượng Đức had just fallen, he needed the 3rd Airborne Brigade in Quảng Nam. So, as soon as the Marines and RF replaced the battalions of the 15th Group, the relief of the 3rd Airborne Brigade began in the Song Bo corridor. However Thi was still without a reserve north of the Hải Vân Pass and fresh opportunities for the new PAVN 2nd Corps appeared in Phú Lộc District.

While Trưởng was shifting forces to save Quảng Nam, the PAVN 2nd Corps was moving new battalions near Hill 350. First to deploy, in late July, was the 271st Independent Regiment, previously under the control of the 325th Division. In mid-August, the 812th Regiment, 324B Division, began its march from A Lưới in the northern A Sầu Valley, covering the entire 50 km (31 mi) on foot, the regiment arrived undetected on 26 August.

== Battle ==
On 28 August attacks on ARVN positions in the Núi Mô Tau-Hill 350 area began. Over 600 artillery rounds hit Núi Mô Tau where the 2nd Battalion, 3rd Infantry, was dug in. The ARVN battalion held the hill against the assault of the PAVN infantrymen, but an adjacent position, manned by the 129th RF Battalion, collapsed, and the battalion was scattered. To the east, on Núi Bong and Hills 273 and 350, the other two battalions of the 3rd Infantry were bombarded by 1,300 rounds and driven from their positions by the PAVN 6th and 812th Regiments. Meanwhile, the 8th Battalion, 812th Regiment overran Hill 224. Thus, in a few hours, except for Núi Mô Tau, all ARVN accomplishments of the long summer campaign in southern Thừa Thiên were erased. The ARVN 51st Infantry Regiment was rushed into the line, but the momentum of the PAVN attack had already dissipated. The casualties suffered by the 324B Division were high, but it now controlled much of the terrain overlooking the Phú Lộc lowlands and Phu Bai.

Heavy fighting throughout the foothills continued into the first week of September with strong PAVN attacks against the 3rd Battalion, 51st Regiment, and the 1st and 2nd Battalions of the 3rd Regiment. The PAVN 6th and 803rd Regiments lost nearly 300 men and over 100 weapons in these attacks, but the ARVN 3rd Infantry was no longer combat effective due to casualties and equipment losses. Immediate reinforcements were needed south of Phu Bai. Accordingly, Trưởng ordered the 54th Infantry Regiment back to Thừa Thiên Province, together with the 37th Ranger Battalion, which had been fighting on the Duc Duc front. Thi took personal command of the ARVN forces in southern Thừa Thiên and moved the 7th Airborne Battalion from north of Huế and the 111th RF Battalion, securing the port at Tân Mỹ, to Phu Bai. These deployments and the skillful use of artillery concentrations along enemy routes of advance put a temporary damper on PAVN initiatives in the foothills.

In an apparent diversion to draw ARVN forces northward away from Phú Lộc, the PAVN on 21 September strongly attacked the 5th and 8th Marine and the 61st Ranger Battalions holding the Phong Điền sector north of Huế. Although some 6,600 rounds, including hundreds from 130 mm field guns, and heavy rockets, struck the defenses, the South Vietnamese held firmly against the ground attacks that followed. Over 240 PAVN infantrymen from the 325th Division were killed, mostly by ARVN artillery, in front of the 8th Marines, and Thi made no deployments in response to the attack. The next week, however, renewed assaults by the PAVN 803rd Regiment carried it to Núi Mô Tau, and by the end of September, the 324B Division had consolidated its control over the high ground south of Phu Bai from Núi Mô Tau east to Núi Bong and Hill 350. The PAVN 2nd Corps immediately began to exploit this advantage by moving 85 mm field gun batteries of its 78th Artillery Regiment into position to fire on Phu Bai, forcing the Republic of Vietnam Air Force (RVNAF) to suspend operations at the only major airfield north of Hải Vân Pass.

The attack to retake the commanding ground began on 22 October with a diversionary assault on Hill 224 and Hill 303. The ARVN 1st Infantry Regiment was to follow with the main attack against the PAVN 803rd Regiment on Núi Mô Tau. Bad weather brought by Typhoon Della reduced air support to nothing, and little progress was made by the ARVN infantry. Nevertheless, the attack on Núi Mô Tau, with a secondary effort against elements of the PAVN 812th Regiment on Núi Bong, began on 26 October. The ARVN 54th Infantry, with the 2nd Battalion, 3rd Infantry attached, made slight progress on Núi Mô Tau, and the 3rd Battalion, 1st Infantry, met strong resistance near Núi Bong. But the ARVN artillery was taking its toll of the PAVN defenders, who were also suffering the effects of cold rains sweeping across the steep, shell-tom slopes. Heavy, accurate artillery fire forced the PAVN 6th Battalion, 6th Infantry, to abandon its trenches on Hill 312, east of Hill 350, and the 803rd Regiment's trenches, bunkers, and communications were being torn up by the ARVN fire placed on Núi Mô Tau. Toward the end of October, the PAVN 803rd and 812th Regiments were so depleted that the PAVN 2nd Corps withdrew them from the battle and assigned the defense of Núi Mô Tau and Núi Bong to the 6th Regiment and 271st Regiment respectively.

As heavy rains continued, movement and fire support became increasingly difficult, and the ARVN offensive in southern Thừa Thiên slowed considerably. PAVN artillery continued to inhibit the use of Phu Bai Air Base, and 1st Division infantrymen around Núi Bong suffered daily casualties to PAVN mortars and field guns. On 24 November, Major General Nguyen Van Diem, commanding the 1st Division, secured permission to pull his troops away from Núi Bong and concentrate his forces against Núi Mô Tau. For a new assault on Núi Mô Tau, Trưởng authorized the reinforcement of the 54th Infantry Regiment by the 15th Ranger Group drawn out of the Bo River Valley west of Huế; the 54th would make the main attack. The 54th Infantry commander selected his 3rd Battalion to lead, followed by the 2nd Battalion and the 60th and 94th Ranger Battalions. When the 3rd Battalion had difficulty reaching the attack position, it was replaced on 27 November by the 1st Battalion. Weather was terrible that day, but two Ranger battalions made some progress and established contact with the PAVN on the eastern and southeastern slopes of the hill. On 28 November, with good weather and long-awaited support from the RVNAF, the 1st Battalion, 54th Infantry, began moving toward the crest of Núi Mô Tau. On the hill the PAVN was approaching a desperate state; one battalion of the 5th Regiment was moving to reinforce but washouts on Route 545 between Ruong Ruong and Thon Ben Tau south of Núi Mô Tau had all but eliminated resupply. Despite difficulties, however, the PAVN continued to resist strongly on both hills. On 1 December, Colonel Vo Toan, the commander of the ARVN 1st Infantry, returned to his regiment from a six-month absence at South Vietnam's Command and General Staff College. His timely arrival was probably responsible for injecting new spirit and more professional leadership into the attack, which had bogged down so close to its objective. Help also arrived for the defenders; the PAVN 812th Regiment, refilled and somewhat recovered from its earlier combat, returned to Núi Mô Tau, replacing the badly battered 6th Regiment. Over on Núi Bong, however the remnants of the PAVN 271st Independent Regiment were without help. On 3 December, the 1st Reconnaissance Company and the 1st and 3d Battalions, 1st Infantry Regiment, were assaulting a dug-in battalion only 50 meters from the crest, but the expected victory slipped from their grasp. Intense fires drove the South Vietnamese back and although the 1st Infantry retained a foothold on the slopes, it was unable to carry the crest.

The attack by the 54th Infantry and the 15th Ranger Group had more success. On 10 December, the 1st Battalion of the 54th took one of the twin crests of Núi Mô Tau and captured the other the following day. As bloody skirmishing continued around the mountain for weeks, the PAVN executed another relief, replacing the 812th Regiment with the 803rd. Although the PAVN remained entrenched on Núi Bong, his access to lines of communication and the base in Ruong Ruong were frequently interdicted by the ARVN units operating in his rear. Furthermore, the PAVN 78th Artillery Regiment was forced to remove its batteries because resupply past the ARVN position around Núi Mô Tau became too difficult. The RVNAF, meanwhile resumed flying into Phu Bai on 13 December.

== Aftermath ==
By making timely and appropriate economy of force deployments, often accepting significant risks, Trưởng was able to hold the PAVN main force at bay around Huế, but the ring was closing on the city. Reinforced PAVN battalions equipped with new weapons, ranks filling with fresh replacements from the north were in close contact with ARVN outposts the length of the front. Behind these battalions, new formations of tanks were being assembled and large logistical installations were being constructed, protected by antiaircraft weapons and supplied by newly improved roads.

The campaign around Phú Lộc continued through January and by 29 January 1975 ARVN 1st Division troops were on all important terrain features: Hills 273, 350, 303 and Núi Bong. The battered PAVN 324th Division withdrew to their base areas southwest of Phú Lộc to reorganize and await orders for the next campaign.

The PAVN claim to have "eliminated" 2,500 ARVN during the battle.

During the 1975 Spring Offensive on 21 March elements of the PAVN 325th Division overran the 61st Ranger positions on Hill 560 to the southeast, while elements of the 324th Division attacked Hills 224 and 303 and Núi Bong and Núi Mô Tau capturing them by 22 March. From these positions the PAVN proceeded to shell Highway 1 and then moved down from the hills cutting Highway 1, severing the land route between Huế and Da Nang.
