= Phan Xuân Nhuận =

South Vietnamese general (1916–2016)

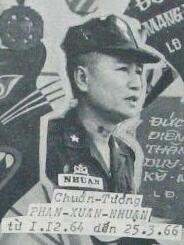
- Phan Xuân Nhuận
- Born: February 1, 1916; Quảng Sơn, Quảng Bình, French Indochina
- Died: February 1, 2016 (aged 100)
- Military career
- Allegiance: State of Vietnam; South Vietnam
- Branch: Vietnamese National Army; Army of the Republic of Vietnam
- Service years: 1948 – 25 October 1955 (Vietnamese National Army); 26 October 1955 – 9 July 1966 (Army of the Republic of Vietnam)
- Rank: Brigadier general
- Commands: Ranger Command; 1st Division

Phan Xuân Nhuận (1 February 1916, in Quảng Sơn, Quảng Bình – 2016,) was a brigadier general of the South Vietnamese Army of the Republic of Vietnam.

== Military career ==
In 1950, after the Vietnam National Army was officially established and separated from the French Union Army, he was promoted to Lieutenant to hold the position of Company Commander in the Vietnamese Infantry Battalion. In 1952, he was promoted to Captain to Deputy Battalion. In 1954, after the signing of the Geneva Accords (20 July), he was promoted to Major and appointed as a Battalion Commander.

In mid-September 1964, following an attempted coup by General Dương Văn Đức against the Nguyễn Khánh junta, Nhuận, then head of Ranger Command in Saigon was a signatory to a communiqué calling on Khánh to purge the military and government of Diem supporters.

On 12 March 1966, following the dismissal of General Nguyễn Chánh Thi as I Corps commander, General Nguyễn Văn Chuân commander of the 1st Division replaced Thi and Nhuận was given command of the 1st Division. Following the dismissal of Thi, the northern zone erupted into a seething inferno of political dissent in the Buddhist Uprising. The number and intensity of strikes, marches, and rallies steadily increased, fueled by soldiers, police, and local officials loyal to Thi. By the beginning of April Struggle Movement forces appeared to control most of Huế, Da Nang and Hoi An and had the support of the I Corps headquarters and the 1st Division. At the same time, South Vietnamese combat operations in the northern zone began to peter out, and the danger that the crisis presented to the war effort became evident. Nhuận placed infantry and armored forces in blocking positions along Route 1, between Huế and Da Nang, and stood ready to reinforce Struggle units in Da Nang.

On 10 June 1966, the South Vietnamese junta began a steady buildup of special riot police under Republic of Vietnam National Police commander Colonel Nguyễn Ngọc Loan on the outskirts of Huế and, on 15 June, sent a task force of two Airborne and two Marine battalions under Colonel Ngô Quang Trưởng into the city for a final showdown. Intermittent fighting lasted in Huế for four days. Opposition was disorganized and consisted of about 1,000 1st Division troops, mostly soldiers from support units. Protected by Trưởng's forces, Loan's police removed the Buddhist altars and arrested most of the remaining leaders of the Struggle Movement, including Thích Trí Quang. The junta gave Trưởng command of the 1st Division replacing Nhuận, and by the end of June both the 1st Division and Huế were under firm government control.

On 9 July 1966 a special military tribunal dismissed Nhuận, Chuân, Thi and other supporters of the uprising from the ARVN.
