= Quảng Sơn (disambiguation) =

Quảng Sơn may refer to several places in Vietnam, including:

- Quảng Sơn, a commune of Lâm Đồng province
- Quảng Sơn, Quảng Bình, a former rural commune of Ba Đồn.
- Quảng Sơn, Quảng Ninh, a former rural commune of Hải Hà district.
- Quảng Sơn, Ninh Thuận, a former rural commune of Ninh Sơn district.
