= 51st Infantry Regiment (South Vietnam) =

Regiment of the South Vietnamese army

- Trung đoàn 51 Bộ binh
- Active: ? – March 1975
- Country: South Vietnam (? – 1975)
- Branch: Army of the Republic of Vietnam
- Role: Infantry
- Part of: I Corps; 1st Infantry Division
- Garrison/HQ: Đà Nẵng
- Engagements: Vietnam War: Phase III offensive; Second Battle of Quảng Trị; Hue–Da Nang Campaign

Commanders
- Notable commanders: Lt. Col. Nguyễn Thọ Lập

The 51st Infantry Regiment was a unit under I Corps of the Army of Republic of Vietnam (ARVN). The regiment operated independently from late 1965 until mid-1972. Subsequently, it was incorporated into the 1st Infantry Division during the Second Battle of Quảng Trị in 1972, and was later disbanded along with the division during the Fall of Đà Nẵng in 1975.

== History ==
In late May 1965, the regiment under Lt. Col. Nguyễn Thọ Lập was targeted by the Việt Cộng (VC) 1st Infantry Regiment of commander Lê Hữu Trữ in the Battle of Ba Gia. The 1/51 Battalion was nearly annihilated while the 2/51 Battalion sufferred heavy losses.

In 1967, the 51st Infantry Regiment along with the 59th Regional Force Battalion in the ARVN Quảng Đà Special Zone under Colonel Nguyễn Duy Hinh (lately the commander of the ARVN 3rd Infantry Division) — engaged in combat with the People's Army of Vietnam (PAVN) 44th Group of Colonel Võ Thứ (formerly the commander of the PAVN 3rd Infantry Division).

=== 1968 Tet Offensive ===
During Phase III offensive, the ARVN 51st Regiment and two Ranger battalions with Marine air support repulsed probing attacks from the PAVN 31st and 38th Regiments, killing almost 300 PAVN before they withdrew to their bases on Go Noi Island, south of Đà Nẵng.

=== 1972 Easter Offensive ===
In July, the PAVN launched attacks on Firebase Checkmate which changed hands several times and then Firebase Bastogne, capturing both bases. In early August with heavy support from B-52s and reinforced by the independent 51st Regiment, the 1st Division recaptured both firebases and expanded its control of the area, recapturing Firebase Veghel on 19 September.

=== 1975 Spring Offensive ===
At 18:00 on 24 March, Gen. Trưởng ordered Gen. Thi to begin the evacuation of all troops defending Huế. All forces north and west of Huế would assemble at Tân Mỹ Base, the port of Huế northeast of the city, cross the narrow channel to Phu Thuan and march southwest down Vinh Loc Island. Crossing the mouth of Cầu Hai Lagoon on a pontoon bridge to be constructed by ARVN engineers and moving along the beach to Highway 1, they would cross over the Hải Vân Pass and on to Đà Nẵng. All heavy equipments would have to be disabled or destroyed. The division would protect the column by blocking in Phu Thu District. I Corps Forward commanded by Thi, established its command post in Tân Mỹ, together with the command posts of the Marine Division and the 147th Marine Brigade. The 7th Marine Battalion deployed there to secure the port and the command posts. The division withdrew from the Troui-Nui Bong sector. The 15th Ranger Group, which had held the Troui River for the pulled back to Phu Bai Combat Base with heavy casualties. The 54th Regiment withdrew from the Nui Mo Tau sector to Camp Eagle, southeast of Huế near Highway 1. The 3rd Regiment withdrew from its forward positions on the Son Hue Trach and assembled in Nam Hoa, south of Huế. The 51st Regiment pulled back and located just west of the city while the division headquarters and the 1st Regiment, which had suffered moderate casualties in the Nui Bong sector, were around Huế.

The withdrawal from Thua Thien Province began in a rather orderly fashion. The 258th Marine Brigade linked up with the 914th RF Group on Vinh Loc Island to cross the narrow channel over to Loc Tri in Phú Lộc District, but the bridge to be installed by ARVN engineers never got there; engineer boats were evidently commandeered by other military units attempting to escape. The withdrawing forces crossed anyway, using local fishing boats. Trưởng flew over the column making its way down the long stretch of Vinh Loc Island and noted that the only apparent disciplined, cohesive units were marines. The rest was a mob and the division ceased to exist as an identifiable unit, most division soldiers who escaped from Huế were subsequently captured at Da Nang; no attempt was made to reconstitute the division.
