= Bastogne (disambiguation) =

Bastogne may refer to:

- Bastogne, a city in Belgium
- Siege of Bastogne, part of the Battle of the Bulge during World War II
- "Bastogne" (Band of Brothers), the Band of Brothers episode based on the Siege of Bastogne
- Firebase Bastogne, a United States base during the Vietnam War
