= Firebase Granite =

Site information
- Type: Army
- Condition: abandoned

Location
- Coordinates: 16.440°N 107.282°E

Site history
- Built: 1970
- In use: 1970
- Battles/wars: Vietnam War; Operation Texas Star

Garrison information
- Occupants: 101st Airborne Division

Firebase Granite was a U.S. Army firebase located west of Huế and east of the A Shau Valley in Huế, central Vietnam.

== History ==
Granite was constructed in February 1970 by the 101st Airborne Division approximately 28 km west of Huế.

The Firebase was assaulted by People's Army of Vietnam (PAVN) on the morning of 20 March 1970, the assault was repulsed for the loss of 10 U.S. killed and 10 PAVN killed. Granite was attacked again on the night of 29 April 1970, the assault was repulsed with the loss of 7 U.S. killed and 1 missing and 18 PAVN killed.

Units based at Granite included:

- 2nd Battalion, 501st Infantry

== Current use ==
Satellite imagery shows that the base has reverted to jungle.

== See also ==
Battle of Fire Support Base Ripcord
