= Lê Văn Nghiêm =

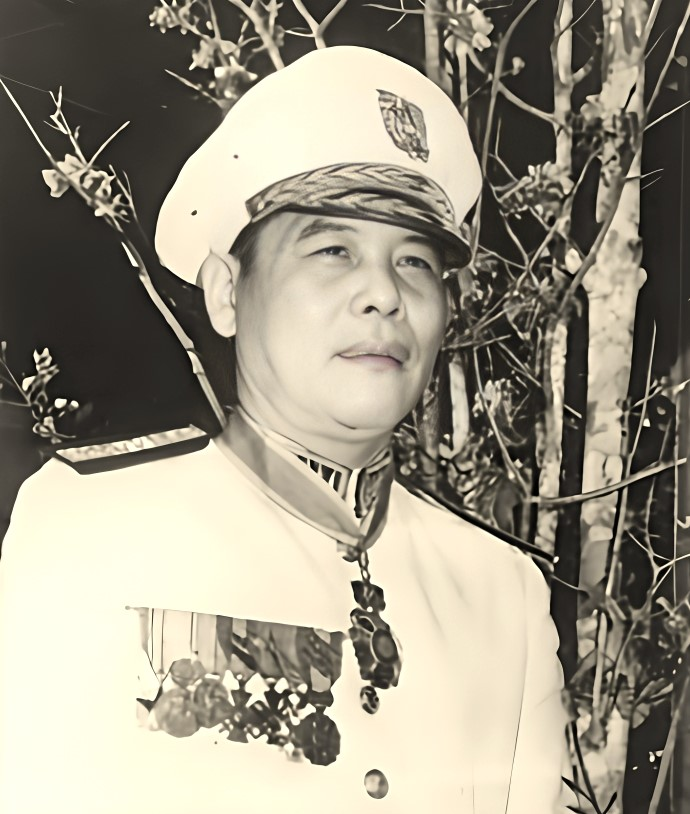

Lieutenant General Lê Văn Nghiêm was an officer of the Army of the Republic of Vietnam.

As a colonel, he was the first commander of the 1st Division, which was based in the northernmost regions of South Vietnam near the border, from May 1 1955 until December 15, when he was replaced by Colonel Nguyễn Khánh, who later led the country.

He served as the commander of III Corps, which oversaw the region of the country surrounding the capital Saigon, from 5 May 1960 until 7 December 1962, when he was replaced by Major General Tôn Thất Đính.

He was transferred to serve as the commander of I Corps, which oversaw the northernmost part of the country, from 7 December 1962 until August 1963 the next year, when he was replaced by Major General Đỗ Cao Trí. On the same night, I Corps forces took part in the Xá Lợi Pagoda raids.
