= Firebase Checkmate =

Site information
- Type: Army

Location
- Coordinates: 16.344°N 107.46°E

Site history
- Built: 1969
- In use: 1969-1975
- Battles/wars: Vietnam War

Garrison information
- Occupants: 2nd Battalion, 502nd Infantry

Firebase Checkmate (also known as Hill 342) is a former U.S. Army and Army of the Republic of Vietnam (ARVN) firebase southwest of Huế in central Vietnam.

== History ==
The base was established along Route 547 15 km southwest of Huế.

The base was first established by the 2nd Battalion, 502nd Infantry.

During the Easter Offensive in April 1972 as part of their attack on Huế, the People's Army of Vietnam (PAVN) attacked the base. The ARVN abandoned the base on the night of 28 April, shortly after Firebase Bastogne fell to a PAVN assault. The base was recaptured by the ARVN in mid-May.

On 6 July 1972 a PAVN assault captured the base with more than 120 PAVN reported killed.

== Current use ==
The base has reverted to jungle.
