= PK-17 =

Site information
- Type: Marines/Army

Location
- Coordinates: 16.547°N 107.449°E

Site history
- Built: 1966
- In use: 1966-68
- Battles/wars: Vietnam War

Garrison information
- Occupants: Army of the Republic of Vietnam

PK-17 (also known as Firebase Sally) was an Army of the Republic of Vietnam (ARVN) and U.S. Marine Corps and Army base located northwest of Huế, Thừa Thiên Province in central Vietnam.

== History ==
The base was located along Highway 1 at the 17 km mark from the city of Huế. Its name was an abbreviation of the French Poste Kilometre 17.

On 30 January 1967 a platoon of 2 M110 howitzers from the 1st 155th Gun Battery moved to PK-17. On 6 April 1967 PK-17 was attacked by People's Army of Vietnam (PAVN) forces, resulting in 2 Marines killed and 7 wounded.

In January 1968 PK-17 was the base for two battalions of the ARVN 1st Division and one battalion of the Airborne Division.

The base played an important role during the Battle of Huế in early 1968. On 2 February the 2nd Battalion, 12th Cavalry Regiment was deployed from Camp Evans to PK-17 to launch an attack towards La Chu to close off the PAVN supply routes west of Huế. The 2/12th Cavalry was pinned down by superior PAVN forces and eventually broke out on the night of 3 February leaving their dead behind.
