= Firebase Shepherd =

Site information
- Type: Army
- Condition: abandoned

Location
- Coordinates: 16.645°N 106.811°E

Site history
- Built: 1968
- In use: 1968-70
- Battles/wars: Vietnam War

Garrison information
- Occupants: 3rd Marine Division; 1st Division (South Vietnam)

Firebase Shepherd (also known as Hill 248) was a United States Marine Corps and Army of the Republic of Vietnam (ARVN) firebase located in Quảng Trị Province, Vietnam.

== History ==
Shepherd was constructed in 1968 by the 3rd Marine Division during Operation Scotland II south of Route 9 and approximately 18km southwest of Mai Loc Camp. The 2nd Battalion, 4th Marines closed Shepherd on 11 November 1968.

The base was reopened in July 1970 to support Operation Clinch Valley.
