= Operation Vinh Loc =

Part of the Vietnam War (1968)

- Part of the Vietnam War
Date	10–20 September 1968
Location	Vinh Loc Island, Phú Vang district, South Vietnam 16.429°N 107.8°E
Result	US/ARVN operational success

Belligerents
United States; South Vietnam	Viet Cong

Commanders and leaders
(United States) Melvin Zais (South Vietnam) Ngô Quang Trưởng	

Units involved
(United States) 2nd Brigade, 101st Airborne Division (South Vietnam) 54th Regiment	

Casualties and losses
(United States) 2 killed	US ARVN body count: 154 killed 370 captured 56 defected

Operation Vinh Loc was an operation conducted by the 2nd Brigade, 101st Airborne Division and Army of the Republic of Vietnam (ARVN) 54th Regiment on Vinh Loc Island, Phú Vang District, lasting from 10 to 20 September 1968.

== Background ==
Vinh Loc Island is a coastal estuary island, 25 miles (40 km) long and a maximum of 3 miles (4.8 km) wide, located 15 miles (24 km) east of Huế. During the Battle of Huế in February 1968, South Vietnamese Regional Forces and Popular Forces responsible for the security of the island had been removed to support the battle, allowing the Viet Cong (VC) to establish control of the area.

On 9 July 1968 the 2nd Battalion, 7th Marines began a one-week sweep of the island but were unable to locate the VC.

On 4 September three Regional Force Companies conducting a sweep operation were engaged by the VC and were only able to break contact with helicopter gunship support. It was estimated that at least two VC Companies and possibly a Battalion were located on the island.

== Operation ==
On 9 September one of the Regional Force companies withdrew from the island. On 10 September Company D, 1st Battalion, 501st Infantry Regiment moved to the northern end of the island, the 2nd and 3rd Battalions of the ARVN 54th Regiment moved to the east of Phu Thu District opposite the island and the 3rd Troop, 7th ARVN Cavalry moved its M113 APCs to Tân Mỹ Base.

On the morning of 11 September 1/501st and the ARVN 1st Battalion, 54th Regiment conducted air assaults into six locations on the island. Everyone encountered in the operation was interrogated by Republic of Vietnam National Police, VC suspects were removed to intelligence centers, while those cleared were escorted to safe areas.

== Aftermath ==
Operation Vinh Loc officially concluded on 20 September, VC losses were 154 killed, 370 captured and 56 Chieu Hoi. Allied losses were two killed.
