= Nguyễn Văn Chuân =

- Born: 1 March 1923; French Indochina
- Died: 1 January 2002 (aged 78)
- Military career
- Allegiance: South Vietnam
- Branch: Vietnamese National Army; Army of the Republic of Vietnam
- Service years: 1950–1966
- Commands: Vietnamese National Military Academy; 14th Light Division; 1st Division; 5th Division; 25th Division; I Corps

Nguyễn Văn Chuân was a Major general in the South Vietnamese Army of the Republic of Vietnam.

== Military career ==
In late 1965 Major general Lewis W. Walt, the commander of the U.S. III Marine Amphibious Force and the I Corps senior advisor said that the 1st Division under Chuân was "waging a skillful campaign" and "consistently destroying the VC in all significant encounters."

On 14 March 1966 he was appointed commander of I Corps, which oversaw the northernmost part of the country, replacing Nguyễn Chánh Thi. The replacement of the popular Thi by his military rival Nguyễn Cao Kỳ sparked the Buddhist Uprising and Chuẩn supported the Struggle Movement against the junta in Saigon. On 9 April Kỳ replaced Chuẩn with Lieutenant general Tôn Thất Đính in an attempt to shut down the opposition.

On 9 July 1966 a special military tribunal retired Chuân, Đính, Thi and other officers involved in the uprising.

== Honours ==
- South Vietnam :
  - Commander of the National Order of Vietnam
  - Army Distinguished Service Order, First Class
  - Navy Distinguished Service Order, Second Class
  - Gallantry Cross
  - Hazardous Service Medal
  - Loyalty Medal
  - Staff Service Medal, First Class
  - Training Service Medal, Second Class
  - Civil Actions Medal, First Class
  - Vietnam Campaign Medal
  - Chuong My Medal, Second Class
