= Quảng Sơn =

- Commune
- Interactive map of Quảng Sơn
- Coordinates: 12.155871°N 107.871121°E
- Country: Vietnam
- Region: South Central Coast and Central Highlands
- Province: Lâm Đồng
- Administrative headquarters: Quảng Hợp Hamlet

Area
  - Total: 454.22 km^{2} (175.38 sq mi)

Population (2025)
  - Total: 22,018
  - Density: 48/km^{2} (120/sq mi)
- Postal code: 65211

Quảng Sơn is a commune in Lâm Đồng province, Vietnam.

On 12 June 2025, the National Assembly of Vietnam issued Resolution No. 202/2025/QH15 on the arrangement of provincial-level administrative units. Under the resolution, Bình Thuận province and Đắk Nông province were merged into Lâm Đồng province, with Quảng Sơn commune becoming part of Lâm Đồng province.
