= Camp Eagle (Vietnam) =

Former US Army base in Vietnam

Camp Eagle (Camp Eagle Heliport)
- Huế, Thừa Thiên Huế province in Vietnam
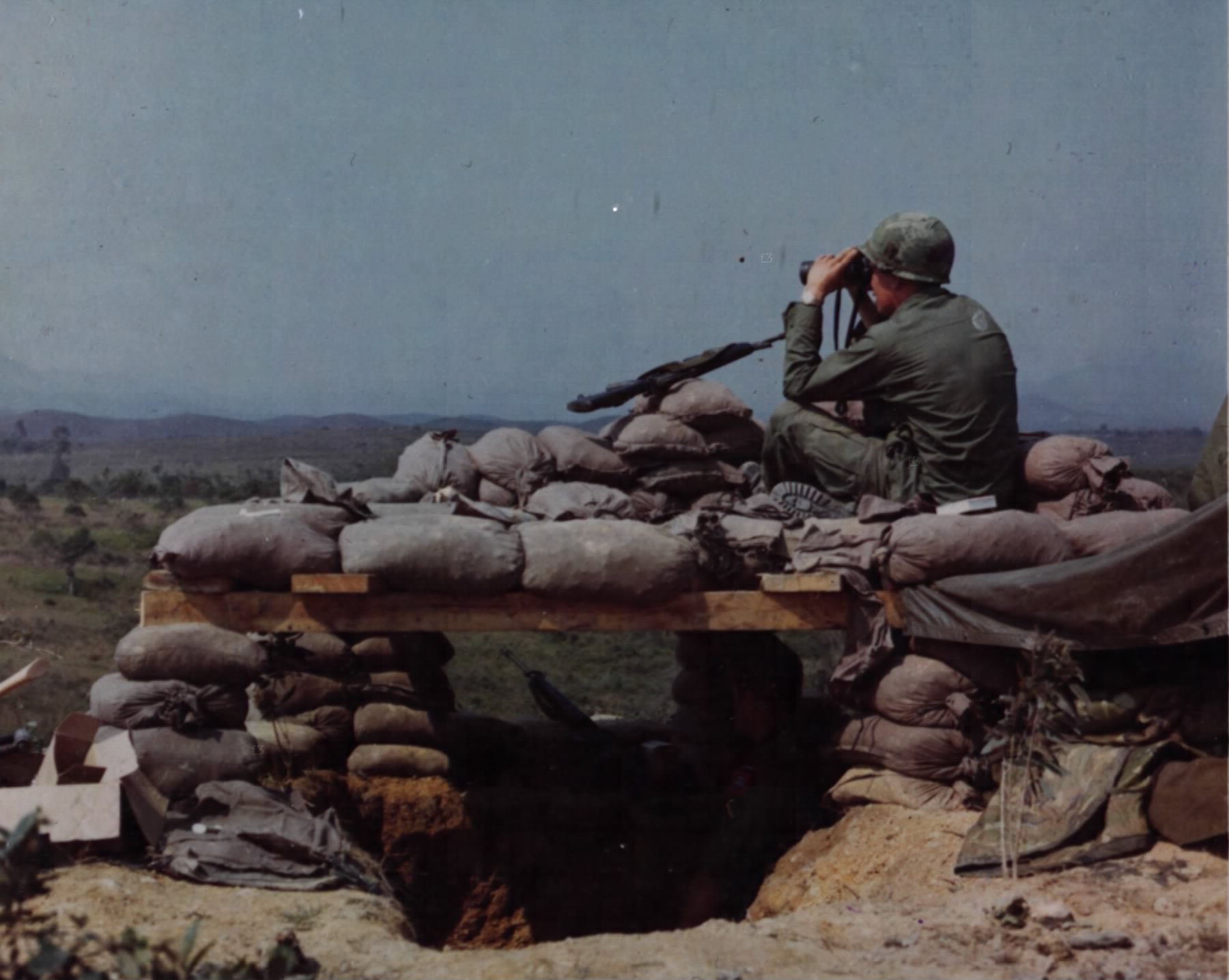
- 3rd Brigade, 82nd Airborne bunker, 6 March 1968

Site information
- Type: Army base
- Operator: Army of the Republic of Vietnam (ARVN); United States Army (U.S. Army)
- Condition: Abandoned

Location
- Shown within Vietnam
- Coordinates: 16.408°N 107.631°E

Site history
- Built: January 1968
- In use: January 1968-1972
- Battles/wars: Vietnam War

Garrison information
- Garrison: 1st Cavalry Division; 3rd Brigade, 82nd Airborne Division; 101st Airborne Division

Airfield information
- Elevation: 104 feet (32 m) AMSL
Helipads
Number	Length and surface
Eagle Intl	Unknown
Bravo	Unknown
APO	Unknown
No's 4-7	Unknown

Camp Eagle (also known as LZ El Paso and LZ Tombstone) is a former US Army base south-east of Huế in central Vietnam.

== History ==
=== 1968 ===
The base was originally established by the 1st Cavalry Division in January 1968, 7 km southeast of Huế and 9 km west of Phu Bai Combat Base.

From February–August 1968, the 3rd Brigade, 82nd Airborne Division comprising

- 1st Battalion, 505th Infantry
- 2nd Battalion, 505th Infantry
- 1st Battalion, 508th Infantry

was based here to support post-Tet Offensive operations.

The 1st Brigade, 101st Airborne Division was based here from May–June 1968.

=== 1969-72 ===
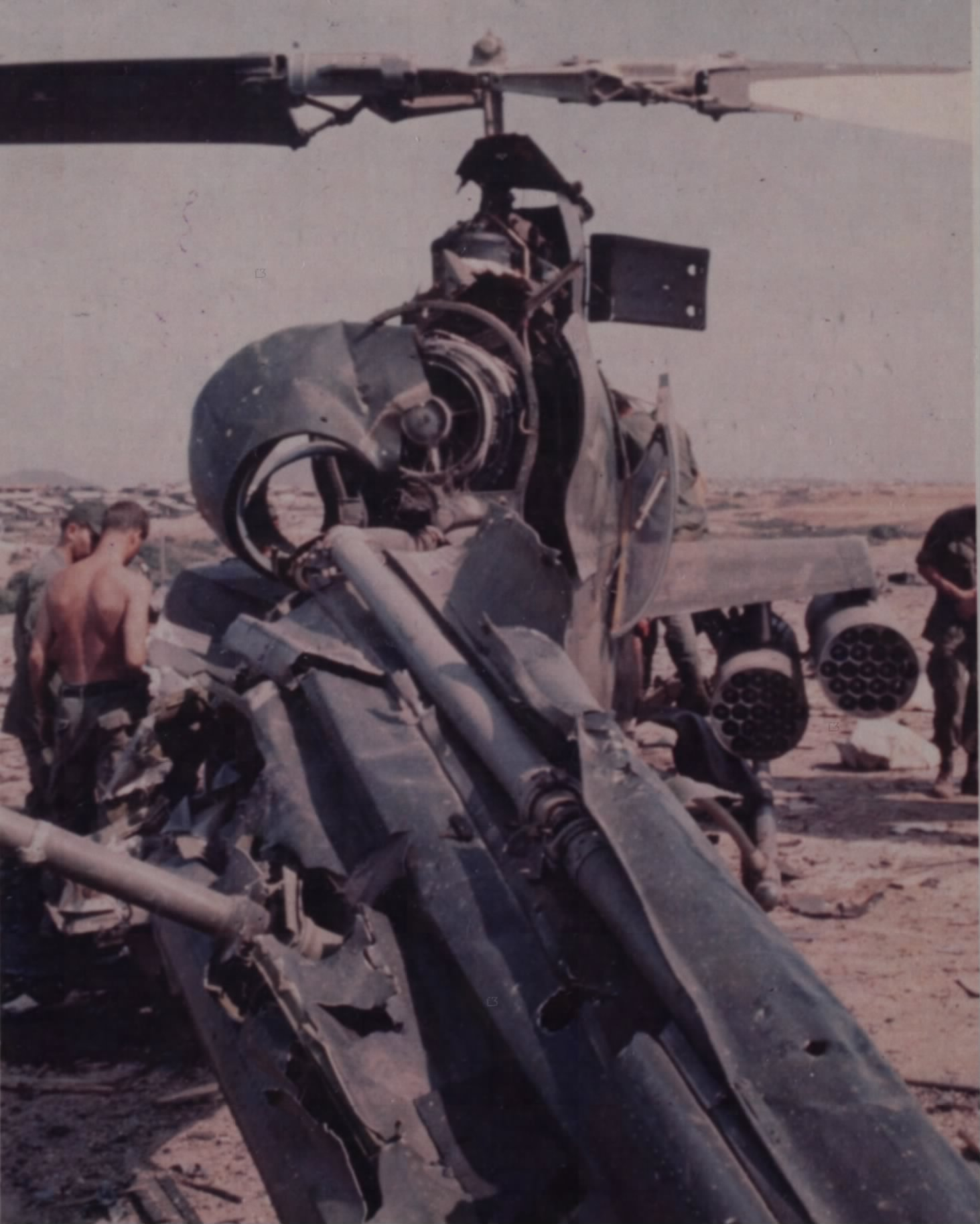
AH-1G damaged by rocket fire at El Toro Pad, 4 May 1970

The base was named "Camp Eagle" when the 101st Airborne Division moved their headquarters here in March 1969.

The 1st Brigade, 101st Airborne was based at Camp Eagle from December 1969 until December 1971, when the following units were detached and remained at the base:

- 1st Battalion, 327th Infantry (November 1971-January 1972)
- 2nd Battalion, 327th Infantry (January–April 1972)

The 3rd Brigade, 101st Airborne was based at Camp Eagle from September 1970-February 1971 and finally from May–December 1971.

Camp Eagle was used to support the 101st Airborne's major operations in the A Shau Valley - Operation Apache Snow in 1969 and Operation Texas Star in 1970.

On 1 February 1972 in a ceremony attended by Brigadier General John G. Hill Jr., Assistant Division Commander, 101st Airborne Division and Major General Phạm Văn Phú, Commanding General, 1st Division, Camp Eagle was turned over to the ARVN.

== Current use ==
The base is abandoned and turned over to farmland, light industry and housing.
