= Firebase Birmingham =

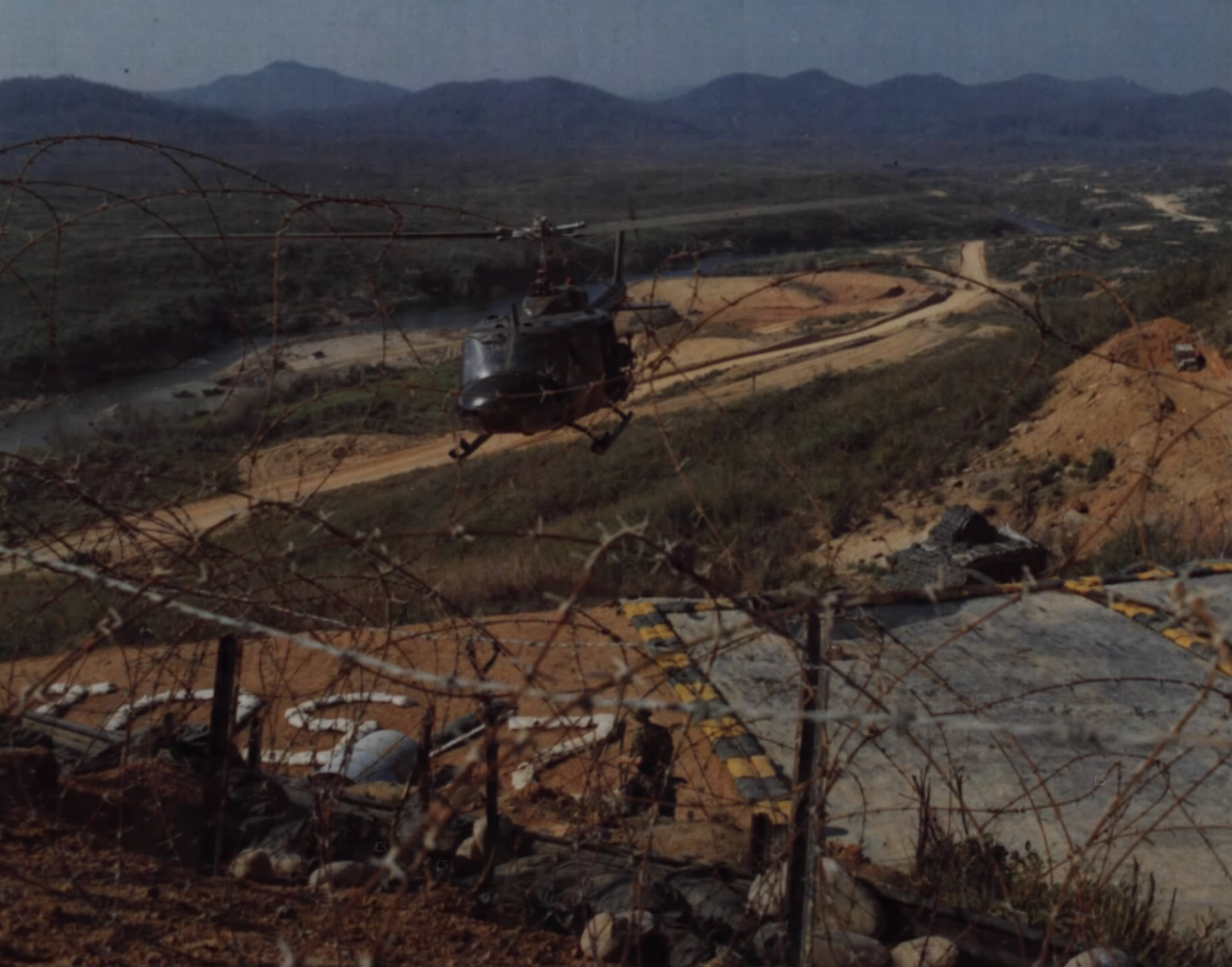
- A UH-1D prepares to land at Birmingham with supplies for members of Company A, 2nd Battalion, 501st Infantry, 28 January 1969

Site information
- Type: Army
- Condition: abandoned

Location
- Coordinates: 16.363°N 107.533°E

Site history
- Built: 1968
- In use: 1968-75
- Battles/wars: Vietnam War

Garrison information
- Occupants: 2nd Brigade, 101st Airborne Division; 1st Division

Firebase Birmingham (also known as FSB Birmingham, LZ Birmingham and Huế Southwest Airfield) is a former U.S. Army and Army of the Republic of Vietnam (ARVN) firebase southwest of Huế in Thừa Thiên–Huế Province, Vietnam.

== History ==
=== 1968 ===
The base was originally established in March/April 1968 by the 1st Brigade, 101st Airborne Division on Highway 547 as part of Operation Jeb Stuart. The base is located approximately 12 km southwest of Huế.

=== 1969-70 ===
Birmingham was used to support the 101st Airborne's major operations against the People's Army of Vietnam (PAVN) base areas in the A Sầu Valley - Operation Apache Snow in 1969 and Operation Texas Star in 1970.

=== 1972 ===
On 1 February 1972 in a turnover ceremony attended by Brigadier General John G. Hill Jr., assistant Division commander, 101st Airborne Division and Major General Phạm Văn Phú, commanding general of the Army of the Republic of Vietnam (ARVN) 1st Division, Birmingham was handed over to the ARVN.

Like most other support bases in Thừa Thiên Province, the base came under intense fire during the Easter Offensive of 1972. Following a PAVN attack on Firebase Bastogne, 6km to the west, on 9 April the ARVN 54th Regiment's headquarters were moved to the base from Bastogne. On 5 May after Bastogne had been abandoned to the PAVN, Birmingham was shelled by the PAVN and in two clashes 2 miles (3.2 km) west and southwest of the base, 39 PAVN and two ARVN were killed.

On 14 May approximately 4,000 ARVN 1st Division troops supported by artillery and B-52 strikes advanced west along Route 547 coming to within 0.5 miles (0.80 km) of Firebase Bastogne and killed 110 PAVN.

The base was overrun by the PAVN, but later recaptured by the ARVN.

=== 1975 ===
The base was captured by the PAVN again during the 1975 Spring Offensive.

== Current use ==
The base is abandoned and turned over to farmland and housing.
