= 1st Division (South Vietnam) =

Division of the South Vietnamese army

1st Infantry Division (1959–1975) 1st Field Division (1955–1959) 21st Infantry Division (1955) 21st Mobile Group (1953–1955)
- Sư đoàn 1 Bộ binh
- 1st Division SSI
- Active: 1 September 1953–March 1975
- Country: State of Vietnam (1953-1955); South Vietnam (1955-1975)
- Branch: Vietnamese National Army; Army of the Republic of Vietnam
- Role: Infantry
- Part of: I Corps
- Garrison/HQ: Huế
- Engagements: Vietnam War: Operation Lam Son 289; Operation Lam Son 54; Battle of Hue; Battle of Quang Tri (1968); Operation Somerset Plain; Operation Vinh Loc; Operation Maine Crag; Operation Lam Son 719; Easter Offensive; Battle of Thượng Đức; Battle of Phú Lộc; Battle of Huế; Hue–Da Nang Campaign

Commanders
- Notable commanders: Nguyễn Khánh; Tôn Thất Đính; Nguyễn Văn Thiệu; Đỗ Cao Trí; Nguyễn Chánh Thi; Nguyễn Văn Chuân; Phan Xuân Nhuận; Ngô Quang Trưởng; Phạm Văn Phú

The 1st Infantry Division of the Army of the Republic of Vietnam (ARVN)—the army of the nation state of South Vietnam that existed from 1953 to 1975—was part of the I Corps that oversaw the northernmost region of South Vietnam, the centre of Vietnam.

The 1st Infantry Division was based in Huế, the old imperial city and one of two major cities in the region, which was also the corps headquarters. Until late 1971 the division was also tasked with the defence of Quảng Trị, the closest town to the Vietnamese Demilitarized Zone (DMZ) and among the first to be hit by the Tet Offensive.

== History ==
The division had its origins in the 21st Mobile Group, raised by the French for the State of Vietnam in Thừa Thiên and Quang Tri, and formally established 1 September 1953. The Mobile Group provided the nucleus for the 21st Infantry Division. In January 1955 the 21st Field Division (commanded initially by Lieutenant Colonel Lê Văn Nghiêm) was established. On 1 November 1955 it was redesignated as the 1st Field Division and then redesignated as the 1st Infantry Division in January 1959.

=== 1964 ===
On 20 September during Operation Lam Son 129 elements of the ARVN 2nd Battalion, 1st Infantry engaged two Vietcong (VC) companies near the village of Le Xuyen, about 10km from Quang Tri. Two platoons of M113 armored personnel carriers attacked from the south and infantry blocked the VC's escape to the north. After an airstrike in which the VC shot down a Republic of Vietnam Air Force (RVNAF) A–1H, they tried to withdraw eastward into rice paddies inundated with waist-deep water. The M113s pursued them and the ARVN killed 77 VC and captured 11 along with three light machine guns and 73 individual weapons. ARVN losses were one dead and seven wounded. At least one of the captives was a North Vietnamese who had just arrived in South Vietnam four days earlier. The Saigon government claimed both companies were elements of the PAVN, a statement MACV denied.

On 26 November the division engaged a VC battalion south of Cam Lộ district. The operation resulted in one ARVN killed and 18 wounded, while the VC lost 73 killed (22 confirmed by American advisers) and three light machine guns, an antiaircraft machine gun, two 60mm mortars, and a 57mm recoilless rifle.

On 14 December a VC battalion attacked Thon La Chu, 3km southwest of Huế. The 1st Battalion, 51st Infantry attacked An Do hamlet but were unable to advance and withdrew to allow airstrikes and artillery fire. The VC evacuated An Do overnight. The battalion fought its way into Bon Tri hamlet, but then withdrew for the night. Again the VC evacuated overnight. ARVN loses were 12 dead and 39 wounded and one US adviser killed. VC losses were 58 killed and nine captured.

=== 1965 ===
On 7 January a VC company attacked a Popular Forces platoon camped 6km southeast of Huế. A second Popular Forces platoon was ambushed going to their aid. A reaction force of a Regional Forces company, a rifle company, a troop of M113s, and part of the division's elite Black Panther Reconnaissance Company joined the battle. The fighting was at such close quarters as to prevent fixed-wing aircraft and US Army helicopter gunships from lending support. A second M113 platoon arrived and assaulted the VC flank. When the South Vietnamese searched the battlefield the next morning, they found 50 VC dead, a 60mm mortar, three light machine guns, and 11 rifles. The relief force lost four dead, four missing, and two carbines.

On 12 January the 1st Infantry Regiment encircled an 80-man Local Force VC company 8km west of Quảng Trị. The ARVN killed 32 VC and captured four prisoners and 19 weapons.

On 10 February in order to counter a VC campaign of assassination, terror, and sabotage in two coastal districts 10km southeast of Huế, the 3rd Infantry Regiment sent a battalion, an additional rifle company, an M113 troop, a Popular Forces platoon, and two howitzer platoons to secure the area. By 1 March, these tactics had killed five VC and captured a Front district leader, twelve VC, and supply caches. Intelligence then indicated that a VC company had fortified itself in a village and the 3rd Infantry commander immediately launched an attack that killed 24 VC, captured six more along with 17 suspects, and seized several weapons, including a 60mm mortar. The 3rd Infantry then returned to original operational area, killing another 50 VC, mostly by artillery fire, and captured a mortar and 26 individual weapons.

On 6 March VC mortars bombarded Quang Tri. When the commander of the 1st Infantry led four M113s to find the mortars, the VC ambushed the column 1km west of the city. An antitank weapon destroyed the command vehicle, killing the regimental commander, his deputy, and three other soldiers.

On 13 April a VC battalion attempted to ambush three division battalions along Highway 1 at the border of Quang Tri and Thua Thien provinces. Forewarned, the ARVN avoided the trap but lost the initiative by waiting for air and artillery strikes to have an impact on the VC. The strength of the VC positions, communication difficulties, and several incidents in which a US Army gunship, an American jet, and a Vietnamese M113 fired on friendly troops complicated the situation. In the daylong action, VC forces killed 8 ARVN and wounded 37 and destroyed two M113s. Allied air and artillery fire reportedly killed 30 civilians and destroyed 74 houses. Five VC bodies were found and residents reported that the VC had carried off another 40 dead.

On 29 May in the Battle of Ba Gia the Division's 1st Battalion, 51st Regiment was ambushed by VC as it attempted to relieve a South Vietnamese Regional Force (RF) unit in the village of Phuoc Loc. In less than one hour of fighting, the battalion was completely destroyed with 270 soldiers either killed or wounded and 217 men were captured. Only 65 ARVN soldiers and three American advisors managed to return to government lines. On the afternoon of 29 May III Corps commander Thi formed a Task Force consisting of the 2nd Battalion, 51st Regiment, the 3rd Marine Battalion, the 39th Ranger Battalion and one squadron of M113s to recapture Ba Gia. On the morning of 30 May the Task Force assembled in Quảng Ngai and following extensive air support from US fighter-bombers and helicopter gunships the force advanced towards their objectives in two separate columns. The VC first attacked the 2nd Battalion, 51st Regiment and then ambushed the 3rd Marine Battalion as it attempted to support the 2/51st forcing both units to retreat to Phuoc Loc. On the morning of 31 May the VC renewed their attacks capturing Phuoc Loc and attacking the 39th Rangers inflicting heavy casualties.

Also on 29 May the VC assaulted a Regional Forces company outpost at Khe Tre, Thua Thien province, 56km northwest of Da Nang. After a VC battalion captured the post, the division organized a reaction. The 1st Battalion, 3rd Infantry was landed at Nam Dong, 8km south of Khe Tre and then began moving north. After splitting the battalion into two columns with half on the road and the other half advancing cross country, the offroad column soon fell behind those on the road, as the terrain was mountainous and choked with vegetation. At 13:30 the VC opened fire on the road column, popping out of spider holes placed 30 meters from the road. The lead South Vietnamese company broke into a run toward Khe Tre, abandoning the rest of the battalion. The battalion headquarters company also ran, this time toward Nam Dong. Left alone on the road to fend for themselves were the battalion commander and his two advisers. The two offroad companies also received fire. Although this fire was light, VC gunners managed to kill or wound both company commanders and several noncommissioned officers. Leaderless, the troops withdrew in disorder. US Army gunships attacked VC positions on overlooking ridge lines, but did not fire close to the ARVN for fear of hitting them. After the VC killed the battalion commander and wounded the senior adviser, the remnants dissolved. Early on 30 May the 3rd Battalion, 3rd Infantry and the elite Black Panther Company were landed at Nam Dong. They explored the VC's 1km-long ambush position, finding no bodies. The ARVN had lost 29 dead, 26 wounded, including one American, and 30 missing. It also had lost 87 weapons.

On 1 July the division used an M113 troop, a Regional Forces company, and four Popular Forces platoons to react to an attack in Thua Thien province by two VC companies. VC losses were 92 killed and 18 captured along with 25 weapons and two mortars. ARVN losses were seven dead and six missing.

In late 1965 Major general Lewis William Walt, the commander of the US III Marine Amphibious Force and the I Corps' senior adviser, assessed the division under General Nguyễn Văn Chuân as "waging a skillful campaign" and "consistently destroying the VC in all significant encounters."

=== 1966-1967 ===
On 12 March 1966 following the dismissal of General Nguyễn Chánh Thi as I Corps commander, Chuân was appointed as the new I Corps commander and General Phan Xuân Nhuận, the head of the Ranger Command in Saigon, was given command of the division. Following the dismissal of Thi, the northern zone erupted into a seething inferno of political dissent in the Buddhist Uprising. The number and intensity of strikes, marches, and rallies steadily increased, fueled by soldiers, police, and local officials loyal to Thi. By the beginning of April Struggle Movement forces appeared to control most of Huế, Da Nang and Hoi An and had the support of the I Corps headquarters and the division. At the same time, South Vietnamese combat operations in the northern zone began to peter out, and the danger that the crisis presented to the war effort became evident. As the new division commander, Nhuận placed infantry and armored forces in blocking positions along Route 1, between Huế and Da Nang, and stood ready to reinforce Struggle units in Da Nang the situation inside the city was tense. The commander of the Quang Nam Special Zone, Colonel Dam Quang Yeu, headed the rebel military units that, according to US estimates, included an infantry battalion from the 51st Regiment, three Regional Forces companies, eleven Popular Forces platoons, and six armored vehicles, plus about 6000 South Vietnamese administrative troops and 200 military police. When Yeu quickly positioned some of his units on the approaches to the downtown area, the start of civil war seemed imminent.

On 10 June 1966 the South Vietnamese junta began a steady buildup of special riot police under Republic of Vietnam National Police commander Colonel Nguyễn Ngọc Loan on the outskirts of Huế and, on 15 June, sent a task force of two Airborne and two Marine battalions under Colonel Ngô Quang Trưởng into the city for a final showdown. Intermittent fighting lasted in Huế for four days. Opposition was disorganized and consisted of about 1,000 division troops, mostly soldiers from support units. Protected by Trưởng's forces, Loan's police removed the Buddhist altars and arrested most of the remaining leaders of the Struggle Movement, including Thích Trí Quang. The junta gave Trưởng command of the division, and by the end of June both the division and Huế were under firm government control. By 1967 US advisers reported that Trưởng had whipped the formerly rebellious division into one of South Vietnam's best army units.

In mid-July 1966 the division launched Operation Lam Son 289 in support of the US 3rd Marine Division's Operation Hastings in the southern DMZ. The division lost 21 killed in the operation.

From 18–26 May 1967 the division conducted Operation Lam Son 54 in coordination with the US 3rd Marine Division's Operation Hickory near Con Thien.

=== 1968 ===
By 1968 the Division's 1st Regiment was responsible for Strongpoint A-1 (16.933°N 107.131°E) part of the Strongpoint Obstacle System south of the DMZ.

On 25 May near Thong Nghia (16.846°N 107.0996°E) the 2nd Regiment engaged a PAVN battalion killing 122 PAVN. The next day the regiment killed another 110 PAVN while losing two killed.

On 8 August the 2nd Regiment engaged a PAVN force from the 1st Battalion, 138th Regiment 2 km east of Gio Linh killing over 100 and forcing them to withdraw towards the DMZ. On the morning of 15 August the 2nd Regiment and the US 11th Armored Cavalry Regiment, supported by Company A, 1st AMTRAC Battalion launched an assault into the southern DMZ which resulted in a reported 421 PAVN killed.

On 23 October the 2nd Regiment supported by Company H, 9th Marines and a tank platoon from Company A, 3rd Tank Battalion launched a raid into the DMZ north of Ha Loi Trung (16.966°N 107.136°E), resulting in 112 PAVN killed.

==== Tet Offensive ====
===== Battle of Hue =====
During the Battle of Hue, the division fought the entirety of the battle while its Mang Ca Garrison, headquarters in the northeast corner of the Citadel was completely surrounded. In the early morning hours of 31 January 1968, a division-sized force of PAVN and VC soldiers launched a coordinated attack on the city of Huế breaking through the western wall of the Citadel. On the Tây Lộc Airfield, the division's elite Hac Bao (Black Panther) Company, reinforced by the 1st Division's 1st Ordnance Company, stopped the PAVN 800th Battalion. The 802nd Battalion struck the 1st Division headquarters at Mang Ca. Although the PAVN battalion penetrated the division compound, an ad hoc 200-man defensive force of staff officers and clerks staved off the enemy assaults. General Trưởng called back most of his Black Panther Company from the airfield to bolster the headquarters defenses, which kept division headquarters secure. Trưởng called in reinforcements ordering his 3rd Regiment; the 3rd Troop, 7th ARVN Cavalry; and the 1st ARVN Airborne Task Force to relieve the pressure on Mang Ca. Responding to the call at PK-17 base 17 km north of Huế, the 3rd Troop and the 7th Battalion of the Airborne task force rolled out of their base area in an armored convoy onto Highway 1. A PAVN blocking force stopped the ARVN relief force about 400 meters short of the Citadel wall. Unable to force their way through the enemy positions, the South Vietnamese paratroopers asked for assistance. The 2nd ARVN Airborne Battalion reinforced the convoy, and the South Vietnamese finally penetrated the lines and entered the Citadel in the early morning hours of 1 February. The cost had been heavy: the ARVN suffered 131 casualties including 40 dead, and lost four of the 12 armored personnel carriers in the convoy. The ARVN claimed to have killed 250 PAVN, captured five prisoners, and recovered 71 individual and 25 crew-served weapons. The 2nd and 3rd Battalions, 3rd Regiment, advanced east from encampments southwest of the city along the northern bank of the Perfume River, but PAVN defensive fires forced them to fall back. Unable to enter the Citadel, the two battalions established their night positions outside the southeast wall of the old City. PAVN/VC forces surrounded the 1st and 4th Battalions of the regiment, operating to the southeast, as they attempted to reinforce the units in Huế. Captain Phan Ngoc Luong, the commander of the 1st Battalion, retreated with his unit to the coastal Ba Long outpost. At Ba Long, the battalion then embarked upon motorized junks and reached the Citadel the following day. The 4th Battalion, however, remained unable to break its encirclement for several days. South of the city, Lieutenant Colonel Phan Huu Chi, the commander of the 7th Armored Cavalry Squadron attempted to break the PAVN/VC stranglehold. He led an armored column toward Huế, but like the other South Vietnamese units, found it impossible to break through. With the promise of U.S. Marine reinforcements, Chi's column, with three tanks in the lead, tried once more. This time they crossed the An Cuu Bridge over the Phu Cam Canal (16.457°N 107.6°E) into the new city. Coming upon the central police headquarters in southern Huế, the tanks attempted to relieve the police defenders, but an enemy B-40 rocket made a direct hit upon Chi's tank, killing him instantly. The South Vietnamese armor pulled back. At 15:00, the 1st Battalion, 3rd Regiment reached the Mang Ca compound. Later that day, U.S. Marine helicopters from HMM-165 brought part of the 4th Battalion, 2nd Regiment from Đông Hà Combat Base into the Citadel. The deteriorating weather forced the squadron to cancel the remaining lifts with about half of the battalion in the Citadel.

The ARVN would attempt to regain the Citadel while the Marines regained the new city south of the Perfume River. Within the Citadel the ARVN 1st Battalion, 3rd Regiment and the 1st Airborne task force cleared out the north and western parts of the Citadel including Tây Lộc Airfield and the Chanh Tay Gate, while the 4th Battalion, 2nd Regiment moved south from Mang Ca towards the Imperial Palace, killing over 700 PAVN/VC by 4 February. On 5 February Trưởng exchanged the Airborne with the 4th Battalion, which had become stalled. On 6 February the 1st Battalion captured the An Hoa Gate on the northwest corner of the Citadel and the 4th Battalion captured the southwest wall. On the night of the 6th, the PAVN counterattacked, scaling the southwest wall and pushing the 4th Battalion back to Tây Lộc. On the 7th Trưởng ordered the 3rd Regiment, which had been futilely trying to break into the southeast corner of the Citadel to move to Mang Ca to reinforce his units inside the Citadel. On 11 February the Vietnamese Marines Task Force A comprising the 1st and 5th Battalions, began to be lifted by helicopter into Mang Ca to replace the Airborne, however due to poor weather this deployment would not be completed until 13 February. Trưởng called for assistance in clearing the Citadel and at 10:45 on 11 February Company B, 1st Battalion, 5th Marines was airlifted aboard Marine CH-46s into Mang Ca, however enemy fire forced several of the helicopters to return to Phu Bai. The Marines together with five M48s from the 1st Tank Battalion would later be loaded onto Mike Boats at the LCU Ramp in southern Hue and ferried across to Mang Ca. On 14 February the Vietnamese Marine Task Force A joined the battle. The operational plan was for the Marines to move west from Tây Lộc and then turn south, however they were soon stopped by strong PAVN defenses; after two days the Vietnamese Marines had only advanced 400 metres. Meanwhile, the ARVN 3rd Regiment fought off a PAVN counterattack in the northwest corner of the Citadel. On 17 February the Vietnamese Marines and 3rd Regiment resumed their attacks south, while the Black Panther Company was moved to support the right flank of the 1/5 Marines, over the next three days these forces would slowly reduce the PAVN's perimeter. On 22 February after a barrage of 122mm rockets the PAVN counterattacked the Vietnamese Marines who pushed them back with the support of the Black Panther Company. On the night of 23 February the PAVN attempted another counterattack but were forced back by artillery fire and the 3rd Regiment launched a night attack along the southern wall of the Citadel, at 05:00 they raised the South Vietnamese flag on the Citadel flag tower and proceeded to secure the southern wall by 10:25. Trưởng then ordered the 2nd Battalion 3rd Regiment and the Black Panther Company to recapture the Imperial City and this was achieved against minimal resistance by late afternoon. The last remaining pocket of PAVN at the southwest corner of the Citadel was eliminated in an attack by the 4th Vietnamese Marine Battalion in the early hours of 25 February. As a result of the battle this division had earned several commendations from the RVN Government as well a US Presidential Unit Citation.

===== Battle of Quang Tri =====
Launched simultaneously with the attack on Hue the PAVN/VC also attacked Quang Tri on the early morning of 31 January. The PAVN 812th Regiment (reinforced), of the 324th Division was tasked with capturing the city. The brunt of the attack would fall on the ARVN forces in and around the city. These were the 1st Regiment, 1st Division, the 9th Airborne Battalion, 2nd Troop, 7th Cavalry an M113 Troop attached to the 1st Regiment, the Republic of Vietnam National Police, a paramilitary body led by regular military officers stationed within the city, and Regional and Popular Force elements in the city. The 1st Regiment had two of its battalions in positions to the north of the city, and one to the northeast, protecting pacified villages in those areas. The regiment's fourth battalion was in positions south of the city in and around the regiment's headquarters at La Vang Base. One Airborne company was bivouacked in Tri Buu village on the northern edge of the city with elements in the Citadel, and two Airborne companies were positioned just south of the city in the area of a large cemetery where Highway 1 crosses Route 555.

Quảng Trị was clear of PAVN/VC troops by midday on 1 February, and ARVN units with U.S. air support had cleared Tri Buu Village of PAVN troops. The remnants of the 812th, having been hit hard by ARVN defenders and American air power and ground troops on the outskirts of the city, particularly artillery and helicopters, broke up into small groups, sometimes mingling with crowds of fleeing refugees, and began to exfiltrate the area, trying to avoid further contact with Allied forces. They were pursued by the American forces in a circular formation forced contact with the fleeing PAVN/VC over the next ten days. Heavy fighting continued with large well-armed PAVN/VC forces south of Quảng Trị City, and there were lighter contacts in other areas. This pursuit continued throughout the first ten days of February.

The US military considered the attack on Quảng Trị "without a doubt one of the major objectives of the Tet Offensive". They attributed the decisive defeat to the hard-nosed South Vietnamese defense, effective intelligence on PAVN/VC movements and the air mobile tactics of the 1st Cavalry Division. Between 31 January and 6 February, the Allies killed an estimated 914 PAVN/VC and captured another 86 in and around Quang Tri. The successful defense of Quang Tri prevented reinforcement at Hue, as well as preventing the further collapse of security in the region.

=== May Offensive ===
On 28 April at the start of the May Offensive the Division's Hac Bao Company located the 8th Battalion, 90th Regiment in the fishing hamlet of Phuoc Yen 6 km northwest of Huế. Units from the 1st and 2nd Battalions, 501st Infantry Regiment surrounded the hamlet and destroyed the battalion in a 4 day long battle. PAVN losses 309 killed (including all the senior officers) and 104 captured. On 2 May a Regional Force company reported that PAVN were in the hamlet of Bon Tri, 6 km west of Huế that had been used as a supply station during the Battle of Huế. Several companies from the 1st Battalion, 505th Infantry Regiment and the Hac Bao Company engaged the PAVN 3rd Battalion, 812th Regiment in a 2 day battle resulting in 121 PAVN dead for Allied losses of 4 killed and 18 wounded.

On 29 April the PAVN 320th Division attacked An Binh, north of Đông Hà Combat Base, this drew two Battalions of the 2nd Regiment into a running battle and the 1st Battalion 9th Marines was sent in to support the ARVN resulting in a seven-hour long battle that left 11 Marines, 17 ARVN and over 150 PAVN dead. On 30 April, a PAVN unit opened fire on a US Navy Clearwater patrol from entrenched positions near Dai Do, 2.5 km northeast of Đông Hà. It was later discovered that four PAVN Battalions including the 48th and 56th from the 320th had established themselves at Dai Do. The Battle of Dai Do lasted until 3 May and resulted in 81 Marines, five ARVN and over 600 PAVN killed. On 26 May the 2nd Regiment killed 110 PAVN north of Thuong Nghia.

From 4–20 August the division participated in Operation Somerset Plain a spoiling attack on the PAVN logistics hub in the A Sầu Valley with the 1st Brigade, 101st Airborne Division. The US/ARVN forces proceeded to search the valley meeting only scattered resistance until 10/11 August when the ARVN 3rd Battalion, 1st Infantry Regiment was attacked by elements of the PAVN 816th and 818th Main Force Battalions. Air and artillery support was called in and the PAVN retreated into the jungle losing several dozen killed. The division lost 11 killed while the PAVN lost 181 killed and 4 captured.

From 10–20 September, the 2nd and 3rd Battalions, 54th Regiment participated in Operation Vinh Loc a security operation on Vinh Loc Island (16.429°N 107.8°E), Phú Vang District, east of Huế with the 2nd Brigade, 101st Airborne Division. VC losses were 154 killed, 370 captured and 56 Chieu Hoi.

=== 1969-71 ===
Throughout this period the division conducted operations to defend the DMZ in addition to numerous named operations.

From 15 March to 2 May 1969 the 3rd Battalion, 2nd Regiment participated in Operation Maine Crag with the 3rd Marine Division in the "Vietnam Salient" in northwest Quảng Trị Province.

From 30 March to 26 May 1969 the 51st Regiment participated in Operation Oklahoma Hills with the 1st Marine Division against PAVN/VC base areas southwest of Da Nang.

From 10 May to 7 June 1969 the 1st and 3rd Regiment participated in Operation Apache Snow with the US 101st Airborne Division in the A Sau valley. During this operation the 3rd Regiment participated in the Battle of Hamburger Hill. ARVN losses were 31 killed while PAVN losses were 675 killed and three captured.

From 26 May to 7 November 1969 the 1st and 2nd Battalions, 51st Regiment participated in Operation Pipestone Canyon with the 37th Ranger Battalion and the US 1st Marine Division against PAVN/VC base areas on Go Noi Island southwest of Da Nang.

From 12 June to 6 July 1969 the 2nd Regiment participated in Operation Utah Mesa with US Marine and Army forces on the Khe Sanh plateau.

At the end of 1969 Major general Melvin Zais, commanding US XXIV Corps in I Corps, proposed breaking up the division (with four regiments and about nineteen combat battalions) into two divisions controlled by a "light corps" headquarters responsible for the defense of the DMZ area, but his immediate superior, Lieutenant general Herman Nickerson Jr. (USMC), commanding the III Marine Amphibious Force (and the I Corps senior adviser), and General Hoàng Xuân Lãm, the I Corps commander, both vetoed the idea, citing the lack of enough experienced Vietnamese officers to staff a new command.

From 1 April to 5 September 1970 the division participated in Operation Texas Star with the US 101st Airborne Division in Quảng Trị and Thừa Thiên Provinces. In late July 1970 following the Battle of Fire Support Base Ripcord, the PAVN 6th Regiment attacked the 1st Regiment's Firebase O'Reilly 8 km north of Ripcord. Trưởng reinforced O'Reilly with another Regiment and the ARVN defended the base for two months before abandoning it and Firebase Barnett in September.

From 5 September 1970 to 8 October 1971 the division participated in Operation Jefferson Glenn with the US 101st Airborne Division to patrol the PAVN/VC rocket belts that threatened Huế and Da Nang.

From 8 February to 25 March 1971 the division troops participated in Operation Lam Son 719. They developed a series of firebases along the south Route 9 in Laos to screen the southern flank of the ARVN advance. On 3 March, elements of the division were helilifted into two firebases (Lolo and Sophia) and LZ Liz, all south of Route 9. Eleven helicopters were shot down and another 44 were damaged as they carried one battalion into FSB Lolo. Three days later, 276 UH-1 helicopters protected by Cobra gunships and fighter aircraft, lifted the 2nd and 3rd Battalions of the 2nd Regiment from Khe Sanh to Tchepone – the largest helicopter assault of the Vietnam War. Only one helicopter was downed by anti-aircraft fire as the troops combat assaulted into LZ Hope, four kilometers northeast of Tchepone. For two days the two battalions searched Tchepone and the immediate vicinity, but found little but the bodies of PAVN soldiers killed by air strikes. PAVN responded by increasing its daily artillery bombardments of the firebases, notably Lolo and Hope. During the extraction of the 2nd Regiment, 28 of the 40 helicopters participating were damaged. Official ARVN sources stated that the division lost 491 dead during the operation, however division officers in private conversations with American officers said that they had lost at least 775 of their men in Laos.

In October 1971 the division's 2nd Regiment and several of its battalions were transferred to the newly formed 3rd Division which assumed responsibility for the defense of the DMZ and Quảng Trị Province.

The division's new operational area was south of the Quảng Trị-Thừa Thiên province boundary and north of the Hải Vân Pass. Its primary responsibility was to defend the western approaches to Huế. Its 1st Regiment and 7th Armored Cavalry Regiment were deployed at Camp Evans, its 3rd Regiment at Firebase T-Bone (16.452°N 107.48°E) and its 54th Regiment at Firebase Bastogne. Division headquarters were at Camp Eagle southeast of Huế.

=== Easter Offensive ===
In February 1972 ARVN intelligence detected that the PAVN 324B Division was moving into the A Sầu Valley in western Thừa Thiên province. The division moved its units west of Huế and clashed with PAVN units along Route 547 in early March.

The initial thrust of the Easter Offensive fell on the 3rd Division in Quảng Trị province and the initial PAVN actions in Thừa Thiên province were designed to keep the 1st Division in place while the PAVN overran Quảng Trị. The 1st Division maintained a strong defense in the foothills west of Huế holding a line from Camp Evans in the north to Firebase Rakkasan (16.449°N 107.327°E) then southeast through Firebase Bastogne and Firebase Checkmate and then to Firebase Birmingham. The 3rd Regiment was kept in reserve to add depth to the defense. Firebase Veghel had been abandoned at the start of the offensive.

The areas around Firebases Bastogne and Checkmate straddling Route 547 came under intense pressure from the PAVN 324B Division and by the second week of April both were cut off. On 11 April the 1st Regiment attempted clear Route 547 but was stopped by the PAVN 24th Regiment despite intensive artillery and air support. By late April the situation at the Firebases was increasingly desperate with the defending battalions reduced to 50% effective and medical evacuation increasingly difficult. On 28 April the PAVN 29th and 803rd Regiments attacked Firebase Bastogne overrunning it within 3 hours, destroying much of the 54th Regiment and forcing the defenders to retreat to Firebase Birmingham. The loss of Bastogne forced the abandonment of Firebase Checkmate during the night.

On 1 May as the defense of Quảng Trị city disintegrated, PAVN pressure on the 1st Division increased as the PAVN launched an assault on Firebase King northwest of Firebase Bastogne and rocketed Camp Eagle.

On 3 May I Corps commander General Lãm was replaced by Lieutenant general Trưởng, commander of IV Corps and former commander of the 1st Division and this change of command and reinforcement by forces of the general reserve stabilized the ARVN position in Thừa Thiên province. The newly arrived Marine Division was given responsibility for north and northwest Thừa Thiên Province, while the division was given responsibility for the area southwest and south of Huế blocking any further PAVN advance from the A Sầu Valley.

On 15 May the division launched a helicopter assault on Firebase Bastogne recapturing the base while two regiments cleared the high ground between the base and Firebase Birmingham and by 25 May Firebase Checkmate had also been reoccupied by the division.

From 11 to 18 June the division launched an attack west towards Firebase Veghel to probe PAVN strength ahead of the launch of Trưởng's Operation Lam Son 72 to recapture Quảng Trị province. The main effort would be made by the Airborne and Marine Divisions while the division would pin down PAVN forces southwest of Huế.

In July the PAVN launched attacks on Firebase Checkmate which changed hands several times and then Firebase Bastogne, capturing both bases. In early August with heavy support from B-52s and reinforced by the independent 51st Regiment, the division recaptured both firebases and expanded its control of the area, recapturing Firebase Veghel on 19 September.

=== 1973-4 ===
In late July 1973 two 3rd Infantry positions west of the Ngoc Ke Trai stream fell to PAVN attack. The pressure continued, and the 3rd Infantry gave up four more outposts along the Song Bo river in late August. Another series of positions along the Ngoc Ke Trai fell in November as signs of deteriorating morale and weak leadership began to appear in the formerly highly respected division. Casualties resulting from the PAVN assaults were light, and the rapid collapse of the defenses could only be attributed to faltering will and uninspired leadership. At this time Lieutenant general Lâm Quang Thi, I Corps Deputy Commanding General and commander north of the Hải Vân Pass, detached a battalion from the 51st Infantry and returned it to the 1st Division to reinforce the Song Bo defenses. The 1st Division Commander, Brigadier general Le Van Than, further reinforced the 3rd Regiment with a battalion of the 1st Infantry Regiment. The line stabilized toward the end of the year, but not until after Trưởng had accomplished the removal of Than and replaced him with Colonel Nguyen Van Diem. Diem took command of the division on 31 October but could make no noticeable headway in solving the division's tactical and morale problems. These were too much the results of conditions beyond the control of the commander: an extended front under continuous enemy pressure, the debilitating effects of cold, wet, typhoon weather; inadequate supply to the forward infantry outposts; and the worsening economic straits in which the soldiers found themselves.

From 18 July to 7 August 1974 a Regiment of the division fought the Battle of Thượng Đức together with elements of the 3rd Division and a Ranger Group.

On 25 July, Trưởng ordered the 54th Regiment from Thua Thien to Quang Nam Province for attachment to the 3rd Division fighting the Battle of Duc Duc. The 54th Regiment arrived in Quang Nam on 26 July, put its headquarters at Điện Bàn District Town, and immediately went into action. While the 1st Battalion took over a security mission in the Da Nang rocket belt near Hill 55, the 2nd and 3rd Battalions began clearing the area around Ky Chau Village on Go Noi Island. Both the 2nd and 3rd met heavy resistance and proceeded westward slowly, engaging a PAVN/VC force on 28 July and dispersing it with heavy losses. The regiment returned to Thua Thien in September.

From 28 August to 10 December 1974 the 3rd and 51st Regiments together with the 15th Ranger Group fought the Battle of Phú Lộc forcing the PAVN back from hills overlooking Highway 1 and from which they could shell Phu Bai Air Base. The fighting here and at Thượng Đức weakened the division and depleted the I Corps reserve forces.

By making timely and appropriate economy of force deployments, often accepting significant risks, Trưởng was able to hold the PAVN main force at bay around Huế. But the ring was closing on the Imperial City. Reinforced PAVN battalions equipped with new weapons, ranks filling with fresh replacements from the north-were in close contact with ARVN outposts the length of the front. Behind these battalions, new formations of tanks were being assembled and large logistical installations were being constructed, heavily protected by antiaircraft and supplied by newly improved roads.

=== 1975 ===
On the early morning of 8 March regiments of the PAVN 324B Division began the Thua Thien campaign attacking along an 8 km sector southeast of Huế. Supported by intense artillery concentrations, PAVN infantry swarmed over the surrounding hills. The 2nd Battalion, 1st Regiment, held on Hill 121, but the 1st Battalion, 1st Regiment, was shattered and driven from Hill 224. The 2nd Battalion, 54th Regiment, was initially forced to give ground, but recovered its positions on Hill 144 on 9 March. The Hac Bao Reconnaissance Company was forced from Hill 50 southwest of Nui Bong. Diem reacted by dispatching the 15th Ranger Group with the 61st and 94th Ranger Battalions to reinforce the line and recover lost positions. The 61st was ambushed en route, sustained moderate losses, but recovered to join the 94th in a counterattack on 10 March. The next day a prisoner of war confirmed that the PAVN 325th Division had moved south and was in position to join the attack in Phú Lộc District.

A battalion of the PAVN 6th Regiment infiltrated through Phú Lộc, and two of its companies seized 12 fishing boats, which ferried them across Dam Cau Hai Bay to Vinh Loc Island. There they attacked Vinh Hien Village on the southern tip of the island and swept north to attack Vinh Giang. Some of the battalion pushed into Phu Thu District east of Huế. The 8th Airborne Battalion, reinforced with two companies of the 1st Battalion, 54th Regiment and a troop of armored cavalry, moved against the PAVN battalion and badly mauled and dispersed it. On 16 March a unit of the 54th Regiment ambushed a remnant of the battalion south of Huế, killing the battalion commander, his staff, and 20 men. Five prisoners taken by the 54th Infantry said that the population gave them no support and only 33 men, mostly wounded, remained alive in their battalion.

On 13 March two battalions of the 3rd Regiment were forced from the Firebase Bastogne area but regained most of their positions in a counterattack the following day.

On 14 March, Trưởng met with Thi, commanding I Corps troops in Quảng Trị and Thua Thien Provinces, and General Bui The Lan, the Marine Division commander, to explain his concept for the final defense of Da Nang. He would pull all combat forces into Quang Nam and defend Da Nang with the 1st, 3rd and Marine Divisions on line and the 2nd Division in reserve, but this deployment would be approached gradually as divisional troops were relieved in Quang Tri and Thua Thien Provinces and terrain in the southern part of the region was abandoned. Trưởng and Thi anticipated a mass civilian exodus from Quảng Trị as soon as the people saw that the Marines were leaving, and he directed his staff to prepare plans to assist the refugees.

On 19 March at meetings in Saigon with President Nguyễn Văn Thiệu, Trưởng was directed to stop the evacuation of Hue and to defend enclaves at Huế, Da Nang, Chu Lai and Quang Ngai City. He could, when forced, surrender Chu Lai and Quang Ngai, but he was to defend Huế and Da Nang at all costs. When Trưởng returned to his headquarters on 20 March, he turned around the displacing 175mm. batteries moving to Da Nang and stopped the evacuation of ammunition from Huế. The Imperial City would be defended despite the fact that PAVN artillery had, on 19 March, already struck inside the Citadel and Highway 1 was clogged with the southbound traffic of thousands of refugees. The contracted organization for the defense of Huế, under the command of Thi, was divided between the deputy commander of the Marine Division, Colonel Tri, who was responsible north of Hue, and the 1st Division commander Diem, south of the city. Tri's outposts were just inside the Thua Thien-Quang Tri boundary, nearly 30 km northwest of Huế. Here, under the direct command of the 14th Ranger Group, were the 77th Ranger Battalion, seven RF battalions, and a troop of armored personnel carriers of the 17th Armored Cavalry Squadron. The four Marine battalions of the 147th Brigade were in the vital Bo Corridor, within light artillery range of the Citadel, while the 78th and 79th Ranger Battalions were on outposts 10 km west of the Marines. South of the Marines, on the high ground at Fire Support Base Lion (also called Nui Gio) (16.437°N 107.436°E) was the 51st Regiment, with two of its battalions. Diem's responsibility began southwest of his 51st Regiment, which was attached to Tri's command. The 3rd Regiment, with two battalions, held the high ground around Firebase Birmingham, above the Song Huu Trach, south of Huế. East of the 3rd Regiment, the 54th Regiment with two of its battalions defended the Nui Mo Tau sector, while the reinforced 1st Regiment extended the line southeast to the Nui Bong area. The 1st Regiment had, in addition to its own three battalions, one battalion of the 51st Regiment, a company of M48 tanks and a troop of armored personnel carriers. The 15th Ranger Group, with its three battalions and one battalion of the 3rd Regiment, dug in on the hills above Highway 1 west of Phú Lộc District Town. The 258th Marine Brigade, with two battalions, was also near Phú Lộc, while the 914th RF Group of three battalions guarded the Hải Vân Pass.

On the morning of 21 March the lead battalions of the PAVN 324B and 325th Divisions, together with the independent Tri-Thien Regiment, with heavy artillery support, assaulted South Vietnamese positions from the Bo Corridor to Phú Lộc. The attacks against the Marines in the Bo Valley were repulsed with heavy PAVN losses, but the Phú Lộc sector, taking the brunt of the attack, began to crumble. In the area of the 1st Regiment, the PAVN 18th Regiment, 325th Division, supported by the 98th Artillery Regiment, took Hill 350 and drove on to assault Nui Bong. Although the mountain changed hands three times that afternoon, the 2nd Battalion, 1st Regiment, controlled it on 22 March. Other formations of the 325th, notably the 101st Regiment, forced the 60th Ranger Battalion, 15th Group, from Hill 500 west of Phú Lộc, and supporting artillery interdicted Highway 1. A stream of refugees began piling up along the road northwest of Phú Lộc. By evening, however, one lane was opened for traffic to Da Nang. To the west, in the hills around Mo Tau, the 27tst Independent Regiment and the 29th Regiment of the 304th Division, both operating under the 324th Division, attacked the 54th Regiment and were repelled. A prisoner from the 27lst said that casualties in his regiment were very heavy, that the 9th Battalion was nearly destroyed. PAVN attacks continued all along the Thua Thien front on 22 March. An ARVN counterattack to recapture Hill 224, a key position in the Nui Mo Tau sector, failed. The population of Huế had declined to only 50,000, and the Hải Vân Pass was clogged with desperate people trying to escape.

On 23 March the 913th Regional Forces Group on the My Chanh Line north of Huế withdrew without orders and they refused to stop at the next delaying position near Phong Dien District Town. The 913th's pullout caused panic among other forces and a general rout developed. I Corps officers attempted to rally the troops at the Bo River. The mass desertion was not motivated by fear of the PAVN, but by the soldiers' overwhelming concern for the safety of their families in Huế. On 24 March, after receiving the report of the collapse of the My Chanh line, Trưởng met with his commanders, Thi, Lan, Major general Hoang Van Lac (deputy commander of I Corps) and 1st Air Division commander, Brigadier general Nguyen Duc Khanh. Lac reported that Da Nang was close to panic also, with more than 300,000 refugees jamming the streets. At 18:00 on 24 March. Trưởng ordered Thi to begin the evacuation of all troops defending Huế. All forces north and west of Huế would assemble at Tân Mỹ Base, the port of Huế northeast of the city, cross the narrow channel to Phu Thuan and march southwest down Vinh Loc Island. Crossing the mouth of Dam Cau Hai Bay on a pontoon bridge to be constructed by ARVN engineers and moving along the beach to Highway 1, they would cross over the Hải Vân Pass and on to Da Nang. No trucks, tanks, or guns could make this march; all would have to be disabled or destroyed. The division would protect the column by blocking in Phu Thu District. By the time these orders were issued, what was left of the population of Hue was streaming toward Tân Mỹ Base to take any available boat or ship out of Thua Thien Province. I Corps Forward commanded by Thi, established its command post in Tân Mỹ, together with the command posts of the Marine Division and the 147th Marine Brigade. The 7th Marine Battalion deployed there to secure the port and the command posts. The division withdrew from the Troui-Nui Bong sector. The 15th Ranger Group, which had held the Troui River for the pulled back to Phu Bai Combat Base with heavy casualties. The 54th Regiment withdrew from the Nui Mo Tau sector to Camp Eagle, southeast of Huế near Highway 1. The 3rd Regiment withdrew from its forward positions on the Son Hue Trach and assembled in Nam Hoa, south of Huế. The 51st Regiment pulled back and located just west of the city while the division headquarters and the 1st Regiment, which had suffered moderate casualties in the Nui Bong sector, were around Huế.

The withdrawal from Thua Thien Province began in a rather orderly fashion. The 258th Marine Brigade linked up with the 914th RF Group on Vinh Loc Island to cross the narrow channel over to Loc Tri in Phú Lộc District, but the bridge to be installed by ARVN engineers never got there; engineer boats were evidently commandeered by other military units attempting to escape. The withdrawing forces crossed anyway, using local fishing boats. Trưởng flew over the column making its way down the long stretch of Vinh Loc Island and noted that the only apparent disciplined, cohesive units were marines. The rest was a mob and the division ceased to exist as an identifiable unit, most division soldiers who escaped from Huế were subsequently captured at Da Nang; no attempt was made to reconstitute the division.

== Organisation ==
Component units:

- 1st Infantry Regiment
- 2nd Infantry Regiment (until October 1971)
- 3rd Infantry Regiment
- 51st Infantry Regiment (from mid-1972)
- 54th Infantry Regiment
- 10th, 11th, 12th and 13th Artillery Battalions
- 7th Armored Cavalry Squadron
- US Advisory Team 3
