= Tân Mỹ Base =

Site information
- Type: Marines/Navy/Army

Location
- Coordinates: 16.567°N 107.63°E

Site history
- Built: 1967
- In use: 1967–1975
- Battles/wars: Vietnam War

Garrison information
- Occupants: 3rd Marine Division; Task Force X-Ray; ARVN 1st Division

Tân Mỹ airfield
- IATA: none; ICAO: none

Summary
- Elevation AMSL: 3 ft (0.91 m)

Runways
Direction	Length		Surface
Direction	ft	m	Surface
	2,500	762	asphalt

Tân Mỹ Base (also known as Col Co, Tân Mỹ Docks, Tân Mỹ Naval Support Activity or Eagle Beach) is a former U.S. Marine Corps, U.S. Navy, U.S. Army and Army of the Republic of Vietnam (ARVN) base northeast of Huế in central Vietnam.

== History ==
The base was located on Vinh Loc Island at the mouth of the Perfume River approximately 12 km northeast of Huế.

=== 1967–70 ===
The U.S. Navy established Tân Mỹ Naval Support Activity in 1967, the base comprised an LST ramp, Seabee base, docks and petroleum storage facilities together with a petroleum, oil and lubricants pipeline to Huế. The base was adjacent to the Eagle Beach rest and recreation facility.

The base was initially defended by elements of the 3rd Marine Division. In February 1968 the U.S. Army's Task Force X-Ray assumed responsibility for base defense before handing control back to the 1st Marines in early March following the end of the Battle of Huế.

The Navy Task Force 116, River Section 521 was based at Tân Mỹ before being moved north to Cửa Việt Base to form Task Force Clearwater.

On 5 September 1968 the base was severely damaged by Typhoon Bess.

A Loran-C station, designation SH-3 "Z" was established at Tân Mỹ in 1969 and operated by the United States Coast Guard.

In March 1970 Tân Mỹ Naval Support Activity ceased operations and the base facilities were handed over to the U.S. Army Support Command.

=== 1971-4 ===
On 23 May 1972 during the Easter Offensive, the 7th Marine Battalion launched Operation Song Than 6-72, an amphibious assault from Tân Mỹ against the flanks of the People's Army of Vietnam (PAVN) force on the Street Without Joy.

On 8 September 1972 during the Second Battle of Quảng Trị, Vietnamese Rangers boarded the USS Juneau and USS Alamo LSD-33 at Tân Mỹ to conduct a feint amphibious assault intended to draw PAVN forces away from the Quảng Trị citadel.

In late 1972 Troop F, 4th Cavalry was based at Tân Mỹ before being withdrawn from Vietnam in late February 1973.

=== 1975 ===
On 22 March 1975 in the face of the PAVN offensive, the decision was made to abandon Huế and withdraw all South Vietnamese forces to an enclave around Danang. The plan was for the 147th Marine Brigade to withdraw to the Tân Mỹ Base where they would be picked up by Republic of Vietnam Navy ships. The base was soon swamped with Marines, soldiers and civilians seeking evacuation, however only smaller ships were able to dock at the base and ferry evacuees to larger ships offshore. Due to the overcrowding and the threat from the closing PAVN, the Marines moved further down the coast where two attempts were made to pick them up by LST over the next 2 days, however the LST could only approach to within several hundred feet of the shore forcing the Marines to attempt to swim out to the ship, in the end only approximately 600 of the 3000 Marines were evacuated to Danang.

=== Current use ===
The base is abandoned but the airfield and docks are still clearly visible on satellite images. On the ground, the airfield bitumen runway is still intact although overgrown with weeds, and the control tower is fully intact.
