= Nam Ba Đồn =

Coordinates: 22°00′N 106°32′E

- Rural commune and village
- Interactive map of Nam Ba Đồn
- Country: Vietnam
- Province: Quảng Trị
- Time zone: UTC+07:00 (Indochina Time)

Nam Ba Đồn is a rural commune (xã) and village in Quảng Trị Province, in Vietnam. This is a mountainous area. Nan River, a tributary of Gianh River flows across this commune.

On June 16, 2025, the Standing Committee of the National Assembly issued Resolution No. 1680/NQ-UBTVQH15 on the reorganization of commune-level administrative units in Quảng Trị Province in 2025. Accordingly, Quảng Tân Commune, Quảng Trung Commune, Quảng Tiên Commune, Quảng Sơn Commune, and Quảng Thủy Commune were merged to form a new commune named Nam Ba Đồn Commune.
