= Firebase Bastogne =

United States base during the Vietnam War

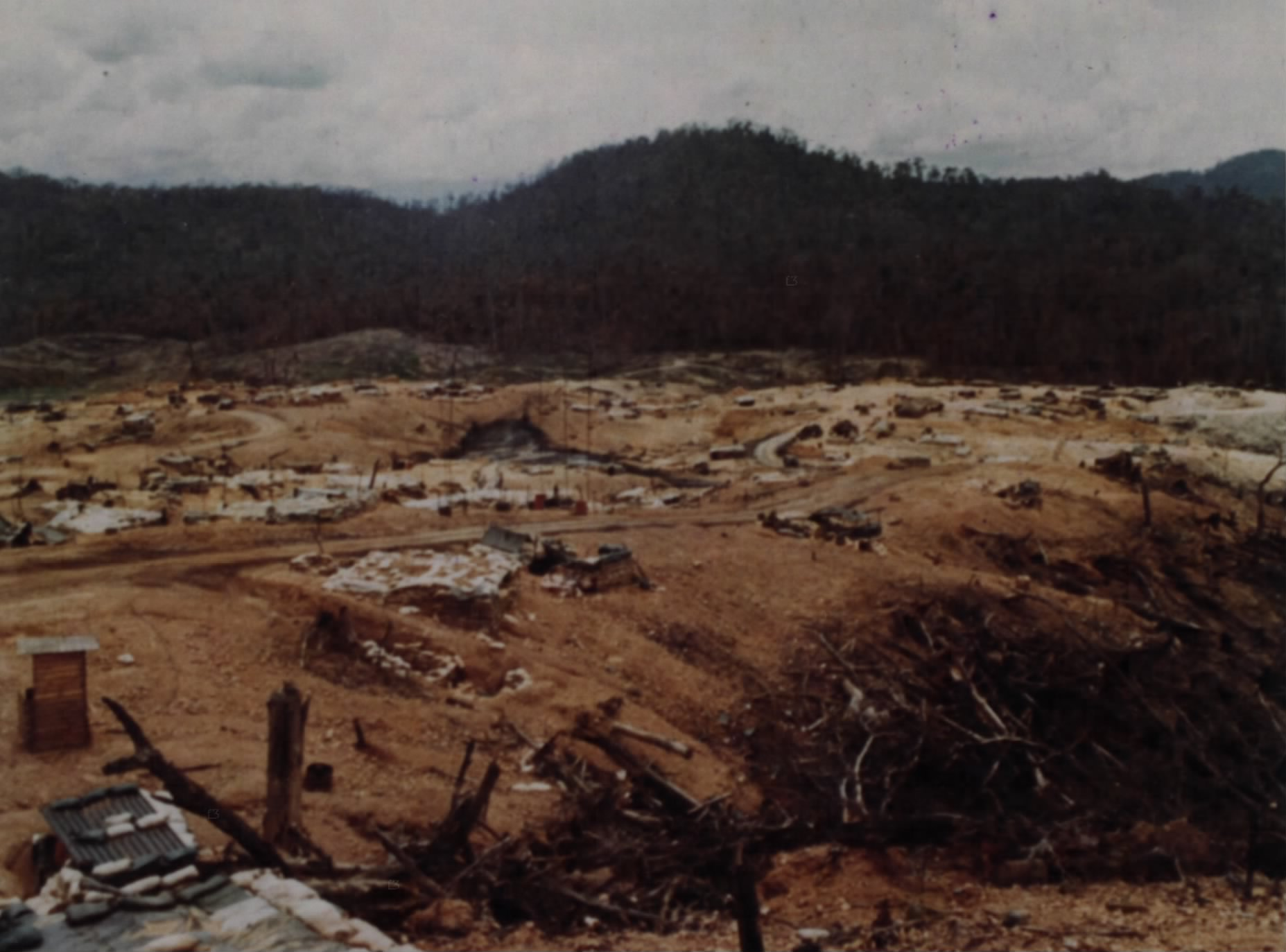
- Firebase Bastogne, 15 July 1968

Site information
- Type: Army
- Condition: Abandoned

Location
- Coordinates: 16°21′20″N 107°26′55″E

Site history
- Built: 1968
- In use: 1968-75
- Battles/wars: Vietnam War; Easter Offensive

Garrison information
- Occupants: 101st Airborne Division

Firebase Bastogne (also known as Firebase Phu Xuan) was a U.S. Army and Army of the Republic of Vietnam (ARVN) firebase, located along Highway 547 halfway between the city of Huế and the A Sầu Valley, a feeder route from the Ho Chi Minh Trail.

== Creation and early years ==
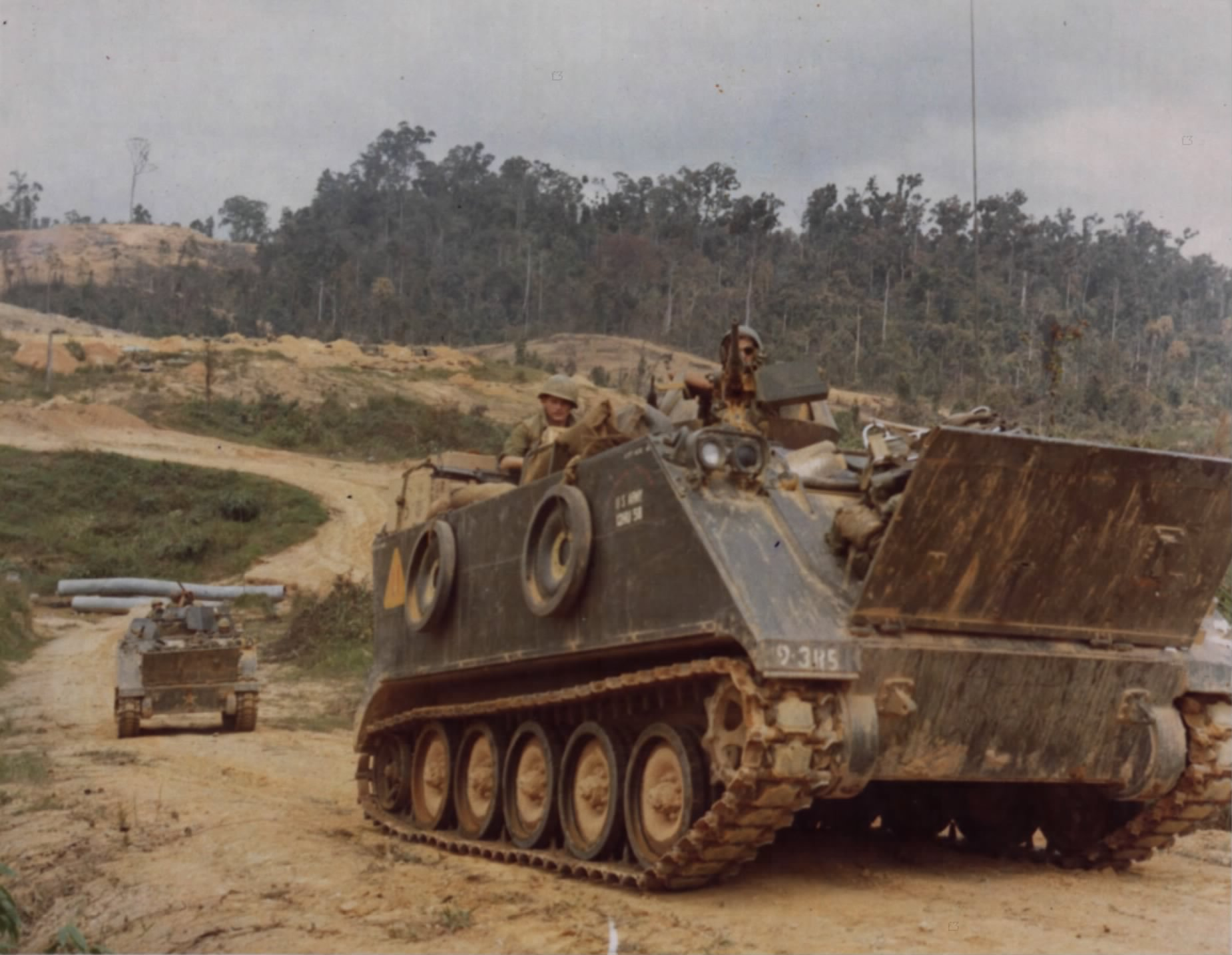
M113s move up the road outside the camp perimeter for escort duty, 16 April 1968

Bastogne was originally constructed in late March 1968, by the 101st Airborne Division during Operation Carentan and was named after the Battle of Bastogne where the 101st Airborne and other U.S. units held the town of Bastogne against seven German divisions during World War II. The base was then used to support Operation Delaware, following which it was closed, but was reopened in August 1969 by the 2nd Battalion, 501st Infantry. Bastogne had three artillery batteries: 105, 155, and heavies (175 and 8 inch two of each in one battery). It also had two M42 Duster (from D Battery 1/44th Artillery), two quad 50's and one searchlight.

Following the withdrawal of U.S. forces, the base was transferred to the ARVN 1st Division who renamed it Phu Xuan.

== Easter Offensive and abandonment ==
In early March 1972 People's Army of Vietnam (PAVN) forces from the 6th Regiment began attacks on Bastogne and its outposts. The heaviest fighting occurred on 18-19 March when 235 PAVN were killed during fighting at Cu Mong/Hill 640. A total of 513 PAVN and 42 ARVN were killed in two weeks of fighting before the PAVN withdrew to its base areas in the west.

Firebase Bastogne, like most other support bases in Thừa Thiên Province, came under intense fire during the Easter Offensive of 1972. On 9 April a PAVN attack on the base was defeated for the loss of 182 PAVN and nine ARVN, however 14 M113 armored personnel carriers were destroyed in the fighting on Route 547. The ARVN then withdrew the four M107s at the base to Camp Eagle and moved the 54th Regiment's headquarters from the base to Firebase Birmingham, 6km to the east. The PAVN then laid siege to the base and on 11 April lost 102 killed as an ARVN armored column tried for the third day to relieve the base. By 12 April the base was running low on food and ammunition and PAVN fire prevented helicopters from evacuating more than 100 wounded at the base. On 13 April after two B-52 strikes around the base, the ARVN relief force reported finding 210 PAVN dead. On 18 April ARVN relief forces reported approximately 400 PAVN and 21 ARVN killed in fighting 4 miles (6.4 km) east of the base. The PAVN began a renewed attack on the base on 28 April and succeeding in overrunning it on 29 April with the survivors withdrawing east to Firebase Birmingham.

After the capture of Bastogne, other ARVN firebases nearby, including Firebase Birmingham, continued to repel the offensive. On 14 May a force of over 4,000 ARVN soldiers of the 1st Division launched a counterattack due to the strategic importance of Firebase Bastogne as it was approximately 32km southwest of Huế and within shelling distance. The base was recaptured by 15 May. On 27 June PAVN forces fired more than 1,000 mortar rounds on ARVN positions 2 miles (3.2 km) southeast of Bastogne, the attack was repulsed for the loss of 60 PAVN and nine ARVN Heavy shelling and repeated ground attacks together with the difficulties of resupply forced the ARVN to abandon Bastogne on 27 July. On 2 August, preceded by B-52 strikes, the ARVN recaptured Firebase Bastogne, meeting no resistance. In fighting east and north of Bastogne 56 PAVN were reported killed.
