= Camp Evans (Vietnam) =

Former U.S. military base in Vietnam

Camp Evans (Camp Evans Airfield)
- Huế, Thừa Thiên–Huế Province in Vietnam
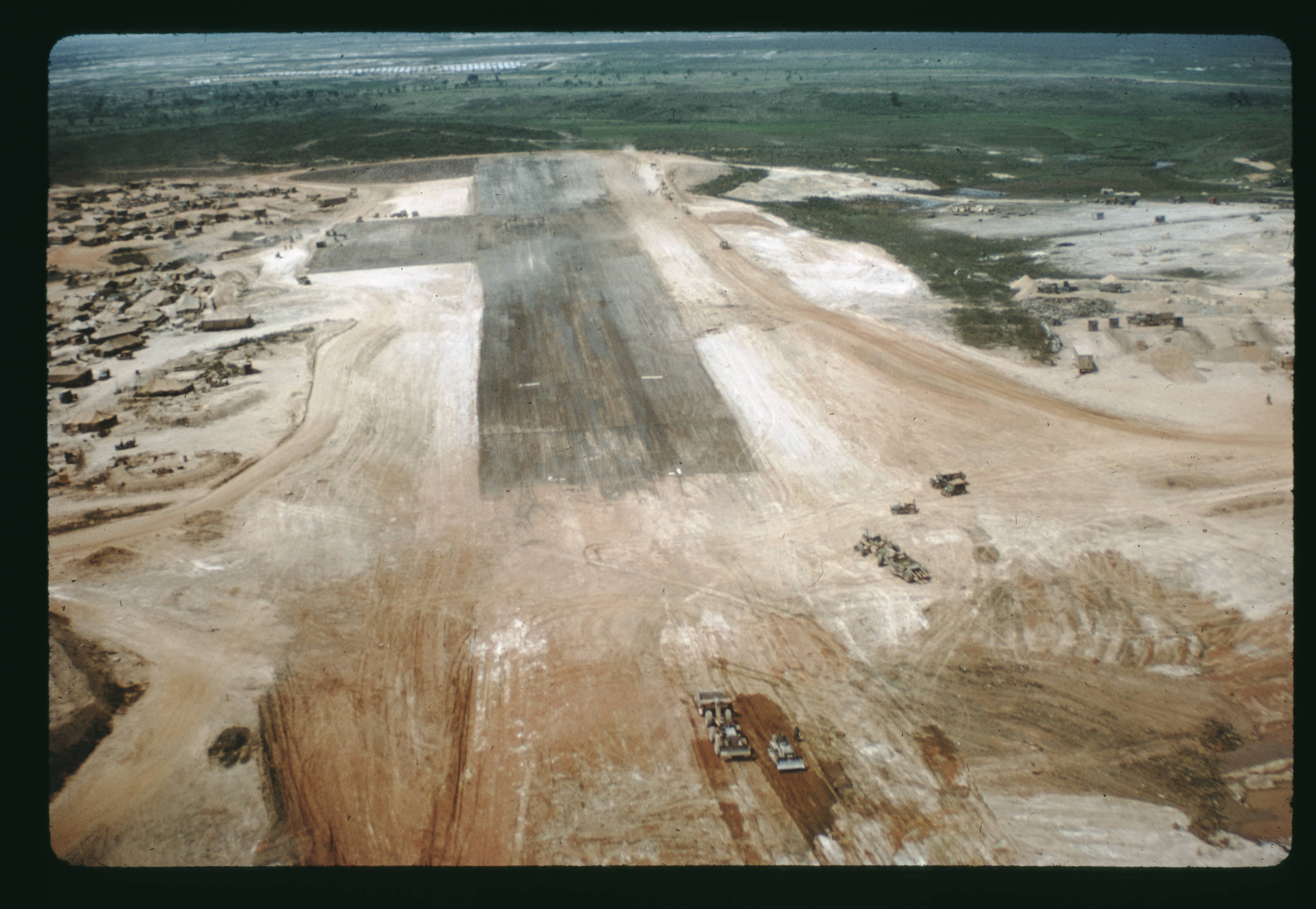
- C-130 capable airfield under construction, 17 March 1968

Site information
- Type: Army/Marine Base
- Operator: Army of the Republic of Vietnam (ARVN); United States Marine Corps (USMC); United States Army (U.S. Army)
- Condition: Abandoned

Location
- Shown within Vietnam
- Coordinates: 16.562°N 107.38°E

Site history
- Built: 1966
- Built by: 8th Engineer Battalion
- In use: 1966-1975
- Battles/wars: Vietnam War

Garrison information
- Garrison: 1st Cavalry Division (Airmobile); 1st Brigade, 101st Airborne Division

Airfield information
- Elevation: 63 feet (19 m) AMSL
Runways
Direction	Length and surface
00/00	2,900 feet (884 m) Aluminium matting

Camp Evans is a former U.S. Army and U.S. Marine Corps base northwest of Huế in central Vietnam.

== History ==
=== 1966–1967 ===
Camp Evans was established by the 3rd Battalion, 26th Marines in late 1966 as part of Operation Chinook. The camp was located to the west of Highway 1, approximately 24 km northwest of Huế in Thừa Thiên–Huế Province. The camp was named after Marine Lance Corporal Paul Evans who was killed during Operation Chinook.

Marine units based at Camp Evans during this period included:

- 4th Marine Regiment

=== 1968 ===
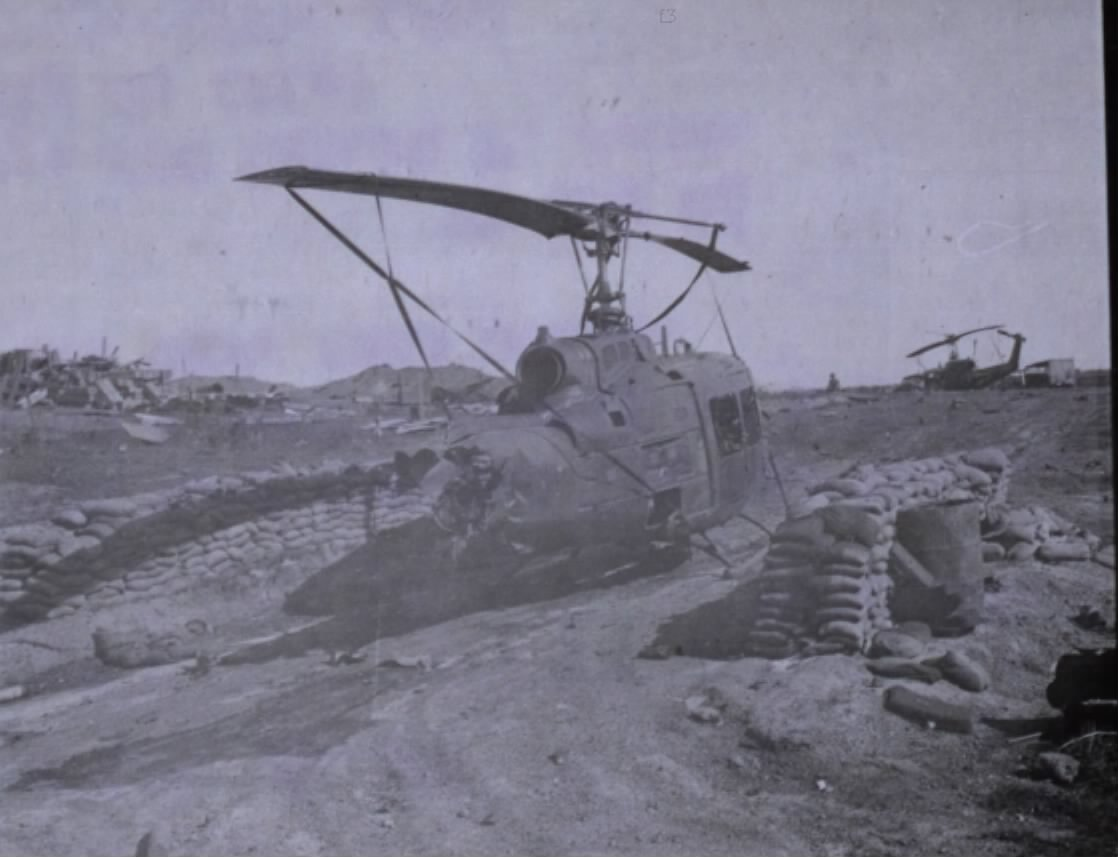
1st Cavalry Division UH-1 damaged in the rocket attack on Camp Evans on 19 May 1968

In January 1968 Camp Evans was taken over by the 1st Cavalry Division (Airmobile).

On the night of 19 May 1968 the ammunition dump at Camp Evans was hit by People's Army of Vietnam (PAVN) rockets and exploded causing a chain reaction and fire that lasted more than 12 hours and damaged or destroyed 124 aircraft rendering the 1st Brigade, 1st Cavalry Division combat ineffective for a week until replacement aircraft arrived.

On 3 October 1968 a USAF C-7 Caribou (#63-9753) that had just taken off from the Camp Evans airstrip collided with a 1st Cavalry Boeing CH-47 Chinook (#66-19041) resulting in the death of all 24 passengers and crew on both aircraft.

=== 1969–1972 ===
Camp Evans was taken over by 1st Brigade, 101st Airborne Division.

Army units based at Camp Evans during this period included:

- 158th Assault Helicopter Battalion
- 3rd Battalion, 187th Infantry Regiment
- 2nd Battalion, 94th Artillery Regiment (November 1969 – 1970)
- 3rd Squadron, 5th Cavalry 9th Infantry Division
- 18th Surgical Hospital (March–December 1969)
- 63rd Signal Battalion (March 1970 – January 1972)
- C Battery, 4th Battalion, 77th Artillery (Aerial Rocket Artillery), 101st Airborne Division (Airmobile)
- 101st Military Police, Third Platoon.

The 20th Tactical Air Support Squadron used Camp Evans as a forward operating base.

== Current use ==
The base is abandoned and turned over to farmland.
