= Operation Texas Star =

Part of the Vietnam War (1970)

- Part of the Vietnam War
Date	1 April – 5 September 1970
Location	Quảng Trị Province and Thừa Thiên Province, South Vietnam
Result	Indecisive

Belligerents
United States; South Vietnam	North Vietnam

Commanders and leaders
John M. Wright; John J. Hennessey	

Units involved
(United States) 101st Airborne Division (Airmobile) (South Vietnam) 1st Infantry Division	324B Infantry Division; 803rd Regiment; 812th Regiment; 29th Regiment

Casualties and losses
(United States) 386 killed (South Vietnam) 370 killed	US body count: 1,782 killed 5 captured

Operation Texas Star was a military operation of the Vietnam War that took place in Quảng Trị and Thừa Thiên Provinces from 1 April to 5 September 1970.

== Operation ==
This was a follow-on operation to Operation Randolph Glen. The main objective of Texas Star was pacification, rural reconstruction, and development along with offensive operations against the People's Army of Vietnam (PAVN) forces in Quảng Trị and Thừa Thiên Provinces.

The United States 101st Airborne Division (Airmobile) and the Army of the Republic of Vietnam (ARVN)'s 1st Division were the combined force for the operation. One brigade retained responsibility for the pacification and development programs while the other two brigades conducted offensive operations in the western portions of the province.

On 1 April elements of the 1st Battalion, 506th Infantry Regiment conducted an assault into Firebase Ripcord. Immediately after being inserted, the units received small arms, sniper and mortar fire from elements of the PAVN 803rd Regiment, 324B Division. Artillery and gunships supported the engagement. U.S. casualties were seven killed. At 00:50 on 7 April, Company D, 1/506th Infantry, occupying a night defensive position 30 km southwest of Huế, was attacked by Rocket-propelled grenade (RPG) and small-arms fire. Supported by artillery, Company D returned fire and the PAVN failed to press the attack. A sweep of the area was conducted at first light with negative results. US losses were one killed. Also on 7 April at 01:05 in the Phu Bai area the ARVN 54th Regiment command post received 70-100 rounds of mixed RPG and mortar followed by a ground attack by elements of the PAVN 804th Regiment, the 4th Battalion, 54th Regiment moved into the vicinity of contact to reinforce the command post and engage the attackers killing 33. On 15 April 506th Infantry elements operating approximately 27 km southwest of Huế found 20 PAVN killed by artillery fire. On 28 April at 05:00 Company B, 502nd Infantry Regiment, operating 37 km southwest of Phu Bai, received an attack preceded by small arms and grenade fire. Company B, with artillery support, repelled the attack killing 12 PAVN while losing one killed. After the contact while conducting a sweep, the unit discovered 75 bunkers and 50 PAVN killed three days prior by airstrikes and artillery.

On 1 May at 08:00 while conducting a search operation 46 km northwest of Huế, the ARVN 3rd Battalion, 3rd Regiment made contact with elements of the PAVN 812th Regiment. Supported by artillery and aerial rocket artillery, ARVN killed 15 PAVN without loss. On 3 May at 11:30 27 km southwest of Huế the ARVN 2nd Battalion, 54th Regiment received small arms fire and RPGs while on a search operation. Organic weapons fire supported by aerial rocket artillery and ground fire was returned. U.S. losses were one killed while the PAVN lost 27 killed. On 12 May at 03:30 the ARVN 3rd Regiment engaged a platoon from the PAVN 812th Regiment 44 km west northwest of Huế, 21 PAVN were killed while the ARVN lost one killed. On 16 May at 21:50 the PAVN 812th Regiment struck the night defensive position of the ARVN 2nd Battalion, 1st Regiment 45 km northwest of Huế. In a coordinated attack-by-fire, followed by a ground attack, the PAVN lost 19 killed to the ARVN artillery supporting the position, while the defenders lost six killed. On 23 May at 10:00 the 1/506th Infantry received an attack-by-fire of 26 mortar rounds on its command post 24 km southwest of Huế killing three U.S.. On 27 May a reconnaissance platoon from the battalion ambushed an enemy force. Bringing in helicopter gunships, the U.S. killed 19 PAVN. Also on 27 May at 17:30 Firebase O'Reilly 40 km west of Huế was attacked by the reinforced PAVN 5th Battalion, 812th Regiment. The defending ARVN 1st Battalion, 1st Regiment, plus one battery of ARVN artillery. fought for two hours before the PAVN withdrew without penetrating the base leaving 74 dead while the ARVN lost three killed.

On 9 June 5 km west of Phú Lộc District, elements of the 2nd Battalion, 327th Infantry Regiment at Firebase Tomahawk sustained a coordinated mortar and ground attack by elements of the PAVN 4th Regiment. Nearby on the same day, other elements of the 2/327the Infantry were hit by an unreported number of mortar and rocket rounds. Cumulative results of the two attacks were one U.S. and 21 PAVN killed. On 16 June at 19:45 21 km north of A Shau Valley, the ARVN 1st Battalion, 3rd Regiment in a night defensive position was attacked by elements of the PAVN 29th Regiment, 324B Division. The unit returned fire with organic weapons supported by artillery and helicopter gunships. PAVN losses were 32 killed, there were no ARVN casualties.

From 17 to 25 June a combined U.S./ARVN operation near Firebase Robin (16.579°N 106.786°E) resulted in 70 PAVN killed and 2 captured and a field hospital destroyed. Captured documents indicated that the PAVN 66th Regiment had two battalions combat ineffective and was in need of supplies.

During July the operation had shifted to defensive actions in and around Firebase Ripcord which ended with the forced evacuation of the base on 23 July 1970.

On 1 August the ARVN 2nd Battalion, 3rd Regiment operating 31 km north-northwest of A Shau Valley engaged a PAVN force killing 12 for the loss of one ARVN killed. The area around Firebase O'Reilly became the scene of numerous engagements during the month.

== Aftermath ==
Military Assistance Command, Vietnam concluded the operation on 5 September 1970. The US claimed 1,782 PAVN killed, while U.S. losses were 386 killed.

== Bibliography ==
- "Operation Texas Star". www.b2501airborne.com. Archived from the original on 2008-07-05.
- "Divisional Operation Texas Star". B Troop 2nd of the 17th Cavalry Association.
