= Operation Osceola =

Part of the Vietnam War (1967–1968)

- Part of the Vietnam War
Date	20 October 1967 – 16 February 1968
Location	Quảng Trị Province, South Vietnam

Belligerents
United States	North Vietnam

Commanders and leaders
MG Rathvon M. Tompkins; Col. Herbert E. Ing; Col. Joseph E. Lo Prete	

Units involved
1st Battalion, 1st Marines; 2nd Battalion, 1st Marines; 1st Battalion, 3rd Marines; 2nd Battalion, 4th Marines	4th Battalion; 808th Battalion

Casualties and losses
19 killed	100 killed (per US)

Operation Osceola was a security operation around the Quảng Trị Combat Base, Quảng Trị Province, South Vietnam from 20 October 1967 to 16 February 1968.

== Background ==
The Hải Lăng Forest was the location of the People's Army of Vietnam (PAVN) Base Area 101 which supported the PAVN 5th and 6th Regiments. The 1st Battalion, 1st Marines, 2nd Battalion, 1st Marines and 1st Battalion, 3rd Marines mounted Operation Medina in the forest from 11 to 20 October 1967. Operation Osceola commenced immediately from the conclusion of Operation Medina.

== Operation ==
Colonel Herbert E. Ing's 1st Marine Regiment was responsible for the Osceola area of operations which bordered the Lancaster area of operations to the west, Kentucky and Napoleon/Saline to the north and Neosho to the east and south and included the Quảng Trị Combat Base, but not Quảng Trị city which was defended by the Army of the Republic of Vietnam (ARVN). The 2/1 Marines and 2nd Battalion, 4th Marines were under the control of the 1st Marine Regiment. Ing concentrated his units on security and pacification operations rather than pursuing the PAVN in the Hải Lăng Forest as in Operation Medina with the 2/1 Marines deployed south of the Thạch Hãn River guarding the approaches to Quảng Trị Combat Base and the 2/4 Marines protecting the base and the area north of the Thạch Hãn River.

On 24 December 1/1 Marines replaced 2/1 Marines in the southern sector and on 31 December the 1/3 Marines replaced the 2/4 Marines in the northern sector. From 2–20 January the two Marine battalions had numerous skirmishes with small PAVN units south and west of the base resulting in 17 Marines and 76 PAVN killed.

On 20 January 1968 the 3rd Marine Regiment assuming control of the Osceola area of operations as Operation Osceola II with essentially the same forces.

On 22 January the 1st Brigade Combat Team, 1st Cavalry Division began deploying into the Osceola southern area of operations as part of Operation Jeb Stuart and Operation Osceola II was reduced to the defense of Quảng Trị Combat Base and its immediate vicinity. 1/1 Marines was moved back to Phu Bai Combat Base leaving 1/3 Marines as the only battalion involved in the operation. On 24 and 31 January the base was hit by 122mm rocket and mortar fire causing minimal damage.

When the PAVN and Viet Cong (VC) launched their Tet Offensive attack on Quảng Trị city the 1/3 Marines were unable to assist the ARVN due to their commitments to the defense of Quảng Trị base and the 1st Brigade, 1st Cavalry Division was the only unit available to assist the ARVN.

On 16 February the 1st Brigade, 1st Cavalry Division assumed responsibility for the Osceola II area of operations from the 3rd Marine Regiment which only retained responsibility for perimeter defense of Quảng Trị base.

== Aftermath ==
Operation Osceola concluded on 16 February 1968. Marine losses were 19 killed, with the US claiming PAVN losses were 100 killed.
