= Van Khanh =

Van Khanh may refer to:

- Vân Khánh, a commune in An Giang province, Vietnam
- Vạn Khánh, a commune (xã) and village in Vạn Ninh District, Khánh Hòa Province, in Southeast Vietnam
- Vân Khánh (singer), a Vietnamese traditional folk singer
