= Felix Sosa-Camejo =

American paratrooper (1940–1968)

- Born: June 29, 1940; Miami, Florida
- Died: February 13, 1968 (aged 27); Quảng Trị province, Vietnam
- Burial place: Woodlawn Memorial Park
- Military career
- Allegiance: The United States of America
- Branch: Army
- Rank: Captain
- Service number: 2325667
- Units: C Company, 1st Battalion, 501st Infantry
- Conflicts: Dominican Civil War; Vietnam War; Vietnam Counteroffensive Phase II Campaign; Vietnam Counteroffensive Phase III Campaign; Tet Offensive; Battle of Quang Tri
- Awards: Combat Infantryman Badge; Purple Heart; Republic of Vietnam Armed Forces Honor Medal; Complete list

Felix Sosa-Camejo (June 29, 1940 – February 13, 1968) was an American paratrooper who served in the Vietnam War and the Dominican Civil War. He was killed during the Tet Offensive in 1968.

== Military career ==
Sosa-Camejo was born in Miami, Florida, on June 29, 1940. He was part of the 1st Brigade Combat Team of the 82nd Airborne Division at Fort Bragg from 1964 to 1965, during which time he served in Operation Power Pack of the Dominican Civil War.

In 1966, Sosa-Camejo joined the 101st Airborne Division, as a captain, in Vietnam. He served in the Second Vietnam Counteroffensive in 1966 and the Third from 1967 to 1968. He was killed during the Tet Offensive, during the Battle of Quang Tri in Quảng Trị City on February 13, 1968.

== Awards ==
Sosa-Camejo received several awards post-mortem:

- Combat Infantry Badge
- Silver Star
- Purple Heart
- Air Medal
- Nation Defence Service Medal
- Armed Forces Expeditionary Medal
- Vietnam Service Medal
- Vietnam Honor Medal 1st Class
- South Vietnam Gallantry Cross
- Parachutist Badge
- Medal of Honor (Nomination)
