= Operation Jeb Stuart =

U.S. Army operation in the Vietnam War

- Part of the Vietnam War
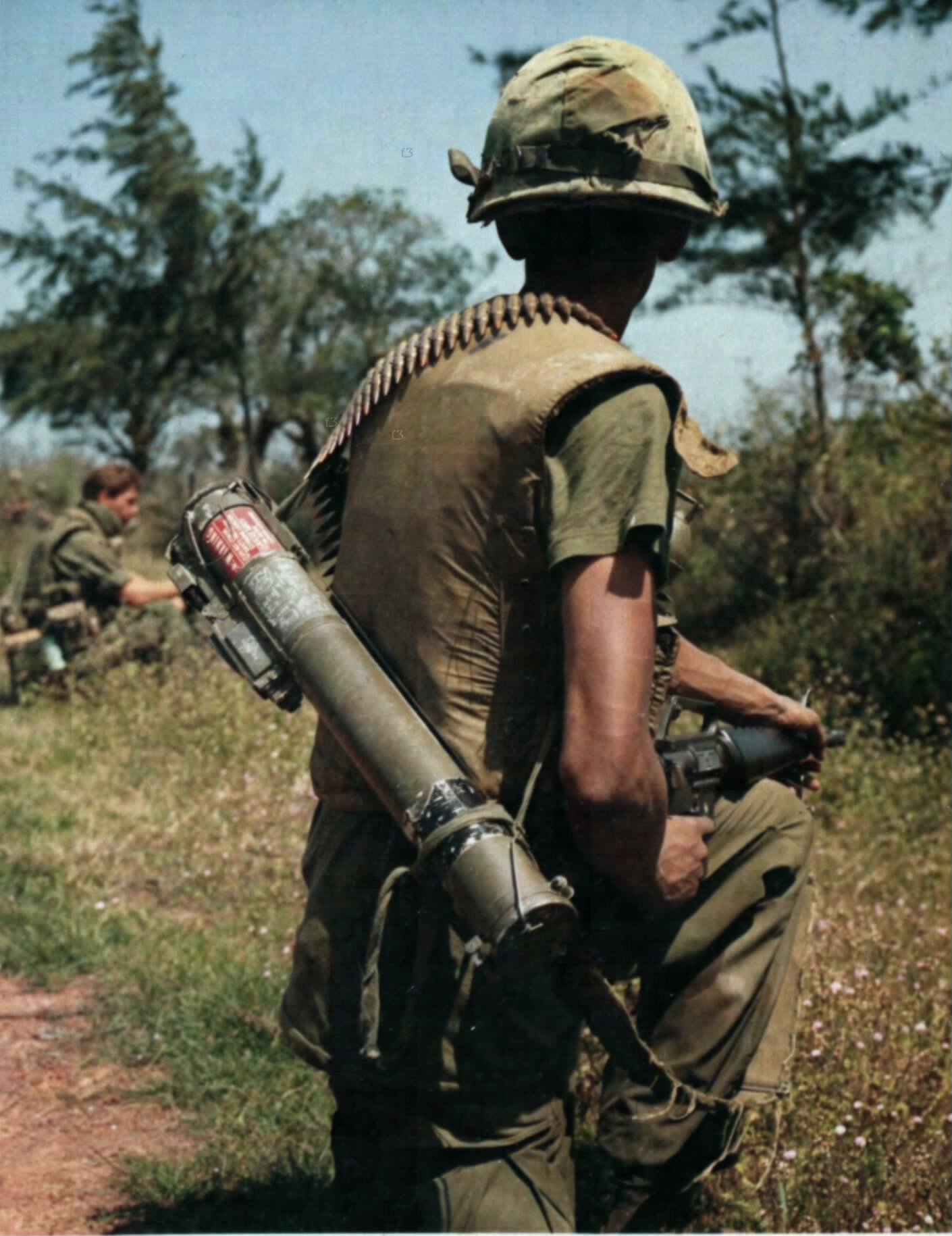
- Soldier of the 2nd Platoon, Company "D", 2nd Battalion, 7th Cavalry Regiment, 9 March 1968
Date	21 January – 31 March 1968
Location	Quang Tri Province, Republic of Vietnam
Result	U.S. operational success

Belligerents
United States	North Vietnam

Commanders and leaders
MG John J. Tolson	

Strength
1st Brigade, 1st Cavalry Division; 3rd Brigade, 1st Cavalry Division; 2nd Brigade, 101st Airborne Division	6th Regiment; 9th Regiment; 812th Regiment; 814th Regiment

Casualties and losses
219 killed 24 missing	3,268 killed 119 captured

Operation Jeb Stuart was a U.S. Army operation during the Vietnam War that took place in Quảng Trị and Thừa Thiên Provinces from 21 January to 31 March 1968. The original operation plan to attack People's Army of Vietnam (PAVN) base areas was disrupted by the Tet Offensive and instead it saw the U.S. Army units fighting in the Battle of Quang Tri and the Battle of Huế.

== Background ==
Operation Jeb Stuart was part of Operation Checkers, to increase the number of manoeveure battalions in I Corps in order to support the besieged Marines at Khe Sanh Combat Base and defeat any other PAVN attack across the DMZ.

On 21 January, COMUSMACV General William Westmoreland ordered General John J. Tolson to move the 1st Brigade, 1st Cavalry Division from Landing Zone El Paso to Quảng Trị City in order to relieve the 3rd Marine Regiment and to move the 3rd Brigade from the Quế Sơn Valley to Camp Evans, to relieve the 1st Marine Regiment. To replace the 2nd Brigade which was involved in Operation Pershing, Tolson was also given operational control of the 2nd Brigade, 101st Airborne Division, which flew into Phu Bai Combat Base from III Corps. When all three brigades were deployed Westmoreland instructed Tolson to commence Operation Jeb Stuart with the goal of locating and destroying PAVN units operating in Base Areas 101 and 114 to the west of Quảng Trị City and Huế.

== Operation ==
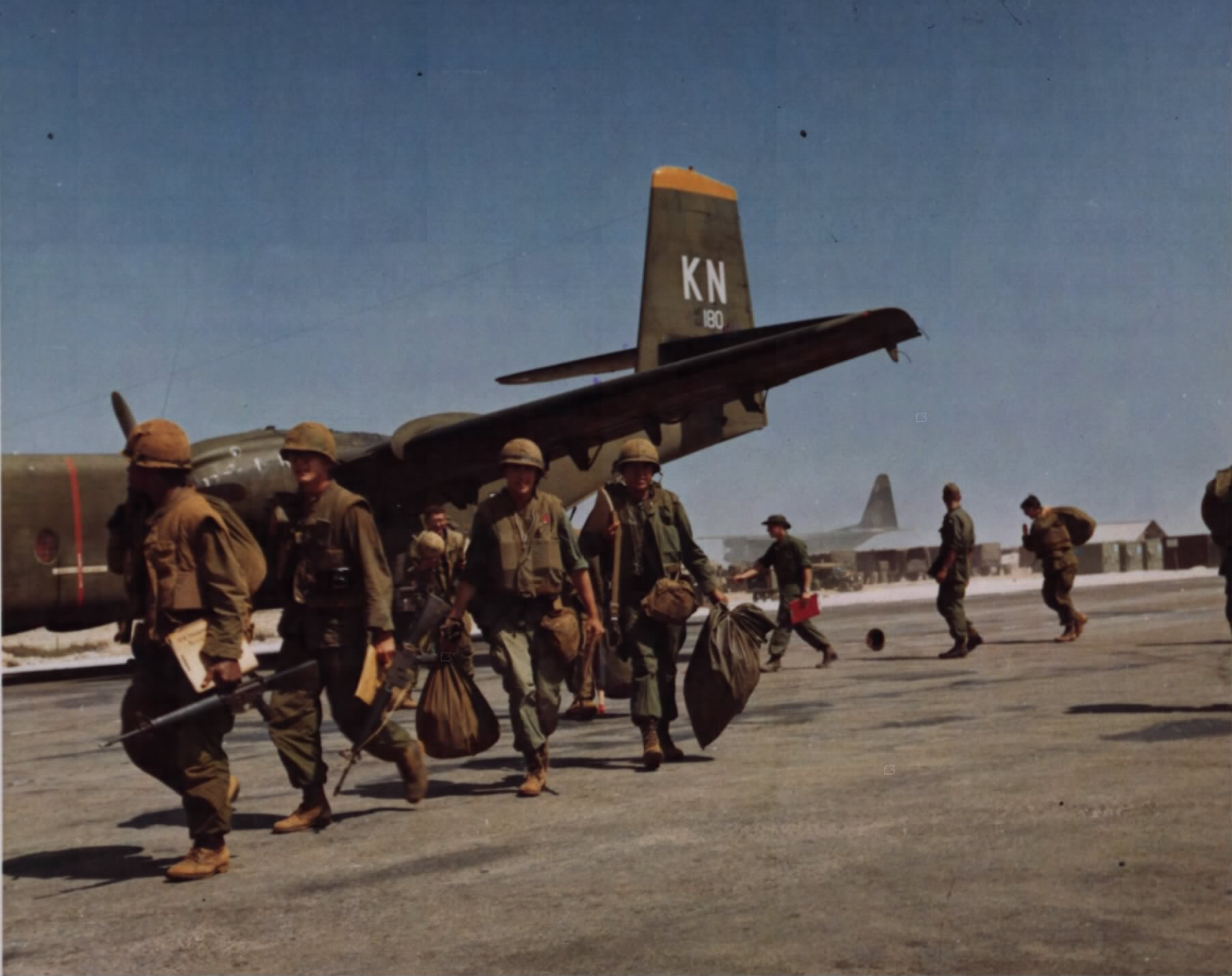
Men of the Division deplane at Phu Bai during the unit's movement to Camp Evans, 22 January 1968

On 22 January the 1st Brigade, 1st Cavalry Division commanded by Colonel Donald V. Rattan began deploying by helicopter to Quảng Trị, establishing its headquarters at Landing Zone Betty (16.718°N 107.194°E) two kilometers south of Quảng Trị, with the bulk of its force at LZ Sharon, another kilometer south, in order to launch attacks on Base Area 101 roughly 15 kilometers (9.3 mi) to the southwest.

On 23 January, the 2nd Brigade, 101st Airborne Division, commanded by Col. John H. Cushman, began arriving at Landing Zone El Paso, where Cushman established his temporary headquarters. While the 2nd Battalion, 502nd Infantry Regiment remained to defend LZ El Paso, Cushman sent his 1st Battalion, 502nd Infantry Regiment, to LZ Betty on 27 January to defend the facility, while the 1st Brigade, 1st Cavalry conducted operation against Base Area 101. On 30 January Cushman sent his 1st Battalion, 501st Infantry Regiment, to LZ Jane 10km southeast of Quảng Trị near Highway 1 and Hải Lăng town, to assist the 1st Brigade, 1st Cavalry operations against Base Area 101.

On 25 January the 3rd Brigade, 1st Cavalry Division commanded by Col. James O. McKenna began arriving at LZ El Paso and was then moved by helicopter and truck to Camp Evans.

On the night of 30/31 January the PAVN and Vietcong (VC) launched their Tet Offensive attacking targets across South Vietnam.

=== Battle of Quang Tri ===
In Quảng Trị the PAVN 812th Regiment (reinforced), of the 324th Division and the VC 814th Main Force Battalion attacked the city at 02:00 on 31 January and launched mortar and sapper attacks on LZ Betty, LZ Sharon and the Army of the Republic of Vietnam (ARVN) La Vang Base. Rattan redeployed his forces from Base Area 101 landing behind the PAVN forces attacking the LZs and La Vang and cutting off their line of retreat meanwhile ARVN forces inside Quảng Trị counterattacked, driving the PAVN from the city by 1 February.

The Battle of Quảng Trị was a U.S./ARVN victory with the PAVN/VC losing an estimated 914 soldiers killed and 86 captured.

Following the battle the 1st Brigade, 1st Cavalry resumed its operations against Base Area 101.

=== Battle of Huế ===
At 02:33 on 31 January a division-sized force of PAVN and VC soldiers launched a coordinated attack on the city of Huế quickly occupying most of the city other than the Mang Cá Garrison in the northwest of the Citadel and the Military Assistance Command, Vietnam in the south of the city.

On the night of 31 January, the PAVN/VC launched a mortar attack on Camp Evans which caused an ammunition dump to explode, disabling most of the helicopters of the 229th Assault Helicopter Battalion. Other attacks along Highway 1 damaged or destroyed 20 bridges and 26 culverts between the Hải Vân Pass and Phu Bai and Highway 1 was closed to convoy traffic until early March.

On 1 February, III Marine Amphibious Force (III MAF) Commander General Robert Cushman alerted Tolson to be ready to deploy the 3rd Brigade, 1st Cavalry Division into a sector west of Huế. Tolson's plan called for an air assault by two battalions of the 3rd Brigade northwest of Huế, the 2nd Battalion, 12th Cavalry was to arrive in the landing zone first, followed by the 5th Battalion, 7th Cavalry to be inserted near PK-17. Attacking in a southeasterly direction, the two battalions would then attempt to close the enemy supply line into Huế.

Mid-afternoon on 2 February, the 2/12th Cavalry arrived in a landing zone about 6 miles (10 km) northwest of Huế. The Cavalry force soon encountered two dug-in PAVN Battalions around the villages of Que Chu and La Chu (16.481°N 107.504°E) which they were unable to overcome as fog prevented their usual gunship support. The 2/12th Cavalry withdrew to a night defensive perimeter, but at dawn on 3 February following a mortar barrage the PAVN attacked their position and the attack was only beaten back with heavy artillery fire. Losses continued to mount throughout the day from mortar and small arms fire and that night the Battalion commander decided to breakout from the encirclement by a night march to an ARVN hilltop position from where they could be resupplied and the casualties medevaced. The 2/12th Cavalry dug into position for the next 4 days.

On 8 February 5/7th Cavalry began moving southwest from PK-17 towards La Chu while 2/12th Cavalry were ordered to retrace their route to form the southern pincer for an attack on the PAVN stronghold. As the 5/7th Cavalry approached Que Chu the command and control helicopter was shot down by anti-aircraft fire, the crew was rescued by a dustoff helicopter. Company B then walked into an ambush north of Que Chu and was pinned down in the open with little cover, they were only able to withdraw after calling in close artillery support. Company D was also engaged by PAVN in the village of Lieu Coc and forced to withdraw. 1/7th Cavalry then dug in to night defensive positions. On 9 February 5/7th Cavalry resumed their advance with artillery support from PK-17 and naval gunfire, they overran Lieu Coc finding PAVN bodies and fighting positions. As they moved closer to La Chu PAVN resistance increased and it was obvious that this was a major PAVN base. 5/7th Cavalry would be stalled north of La Chu for two weeks, probing but failing to penetrate the PAVN defenses.

On 16 February deputy COMUSMACV General Creighton Abrams flew into PK-17 for a meeting with Tolson where Abrams expressed his displeasure at the Cavalry's slow progress. Following this visit two more cavalry Battalions (1st Battalion, 7th Cavalry Regiment and the 2nd Battalion, 501st Infantry Regiment) and additional air and artillery support were committed to the attack on La Chu.

On 21 February following intensive radar-guided airstrikes and artillery strikes, the four Cavalry battalions launched a four-pronged attack from the north, west and south on Que Chu and La Chu. While the PAVN strongly defended the perimeter, once the Cavalry forces broke through with the support of two newly arrived M42 Dusters, they found that the base had been largely abandoned while the Cavalry had been building up their forces for the attack. The Cavalry had finally captured the PAVN's main support base, but were still 8 km from the Citadel. The 3rd Brigade would not reach the west wall of the Citadel until 25 February by which time the PAVN/VC had successfully withdrawn from the battlefield. It was estimated that it would have taken at least 16 battalions to establish an effective cordon around Huế, at this time there were only 30 battalions available in all of I Corps.

== Aftermath ==
The 2nd Brigade, 101st Airborne Division and the newly deployed 3rd Brigade, 82nd Airborne Division under Operation Carentan gradually took over the Jeb Stuart area from the 1st Cavalry as it prepared for Operation Pegasus, the relief of Khe Sanh and Operation Jeb Stuart was terminated on 31 March 1968.

The operation was seen as a success. 219 U.S. soldiers were killed and 1,735 were wounded. On the other side, the PAVN and VC had 3,628 known casualties.
