= 20th Attack Squadron =

20th Attack Squadron

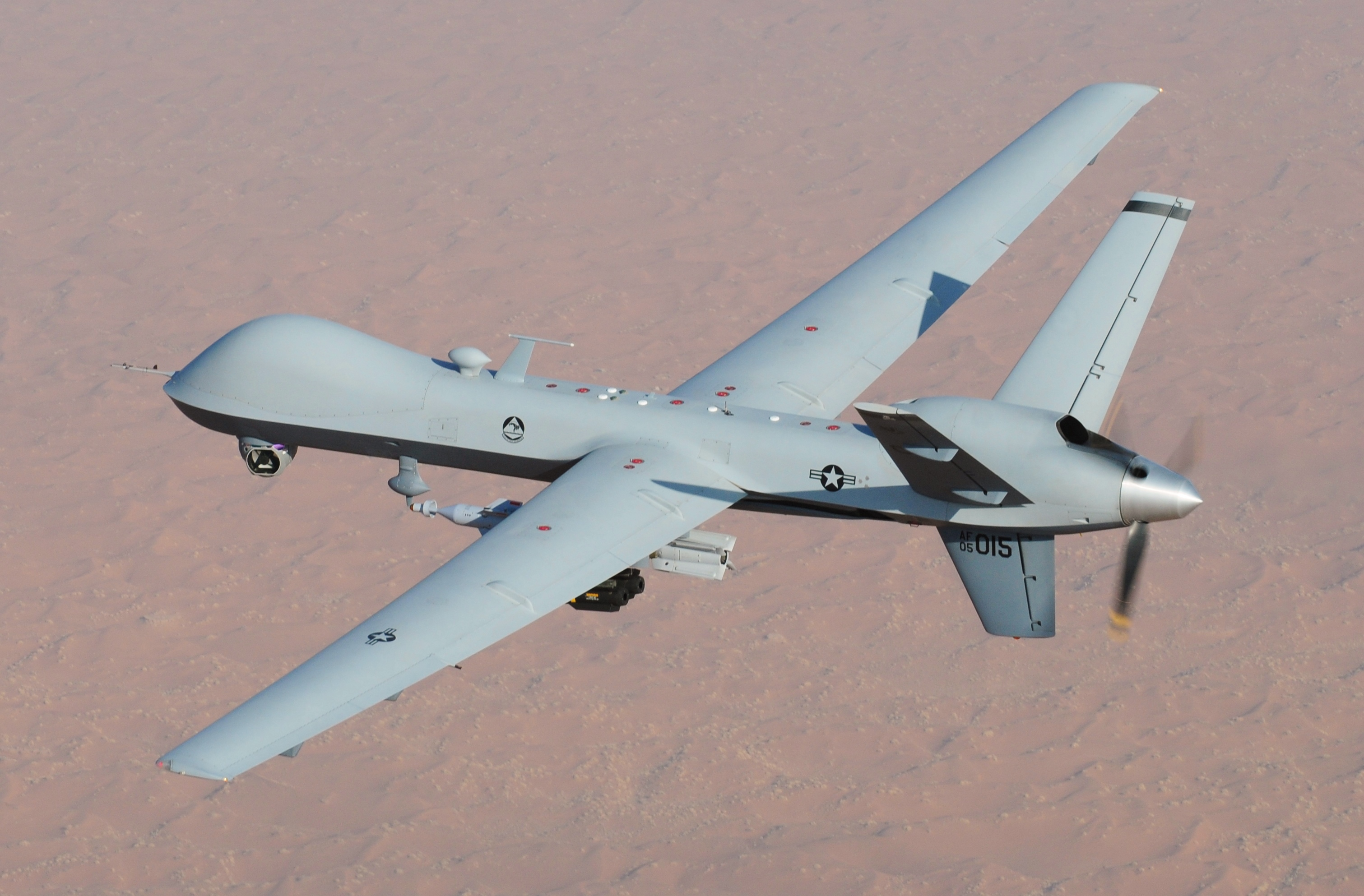
- U.S. Air Force MQ-9 Reaper
- Active: 1940–1949; 1965–1973; 1973–1984; 1990–1991; 2011–present
- Country: United States
- Branch: United States Air Force
- Role: Attack
- Size: Squadron
- Part of: Air Combat Command
- Garrison/HQ: Whiteman Air Force Base
- Motto: First on Target
- Engagements: World War II; Vietnam
- Decorations: Presidential Unit Citation; Air Force Outstanding Unit Award with Combat "V" Device; Air Force Outstanding Unit Award; Republic of Vietnam Gallantry Cross with Palm

Insignia
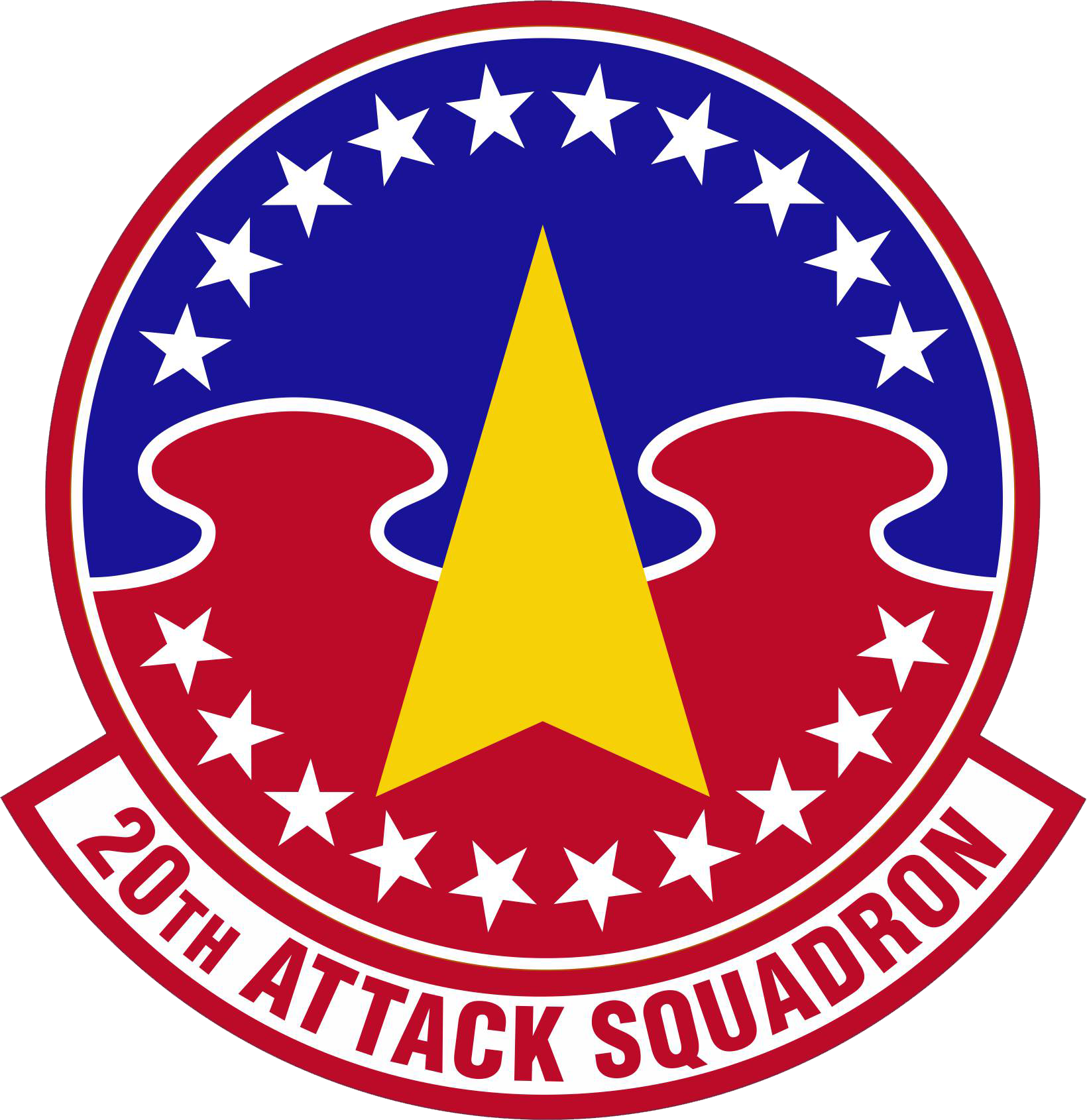
- 20th Attack Squadron emblem

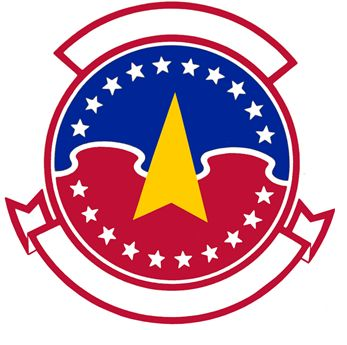
- 20th Reconnaissance Squadron emblem (Approved 24 June 1974)

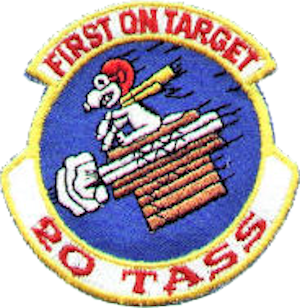
- Patch with 20th Tactical Air Support Squadron emblem (Unapproved, used during Vietnam War)

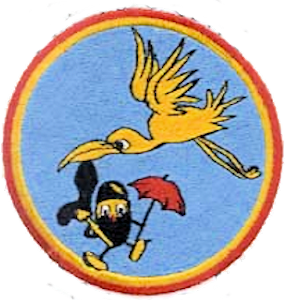
- Patch with 20th Troop Carrier Squadron emblem (Approved 13 January 1943)

The 20th Attack Squadron is a United States Air Force unit, based at Whiteman Air Force Base, Missouri. It currently flies the General Atomics MQ-9 Reaper and is assigned to the 432d Wing at Creech Air Force Base, Nevada.

It was originally activated as the 20th Transport Squadron in 1940 and served as a troop carrier unit in Panama during and after World War II, until it was inactivated in 1949.

Activated in 1965 as the 20th Tactical Air Support Squadron, it served notably for seven and a half years of combat duty during the Vietnam War, and was inactivated in 1973. While in inactive status, the two squadrons were consolidated into a single unit. The 20th TASS was reactivated at Shaw Air Force Base in 1990, and again inactivated on 31 December 1991.

The unit was redesignated as the 20th Reconnaissance Squadron and its reactivation at Whiteman took place on 14 January 2011. In May 2016, it was redesignated the 20th Attack Squadron

== History ==
=== World War II ===
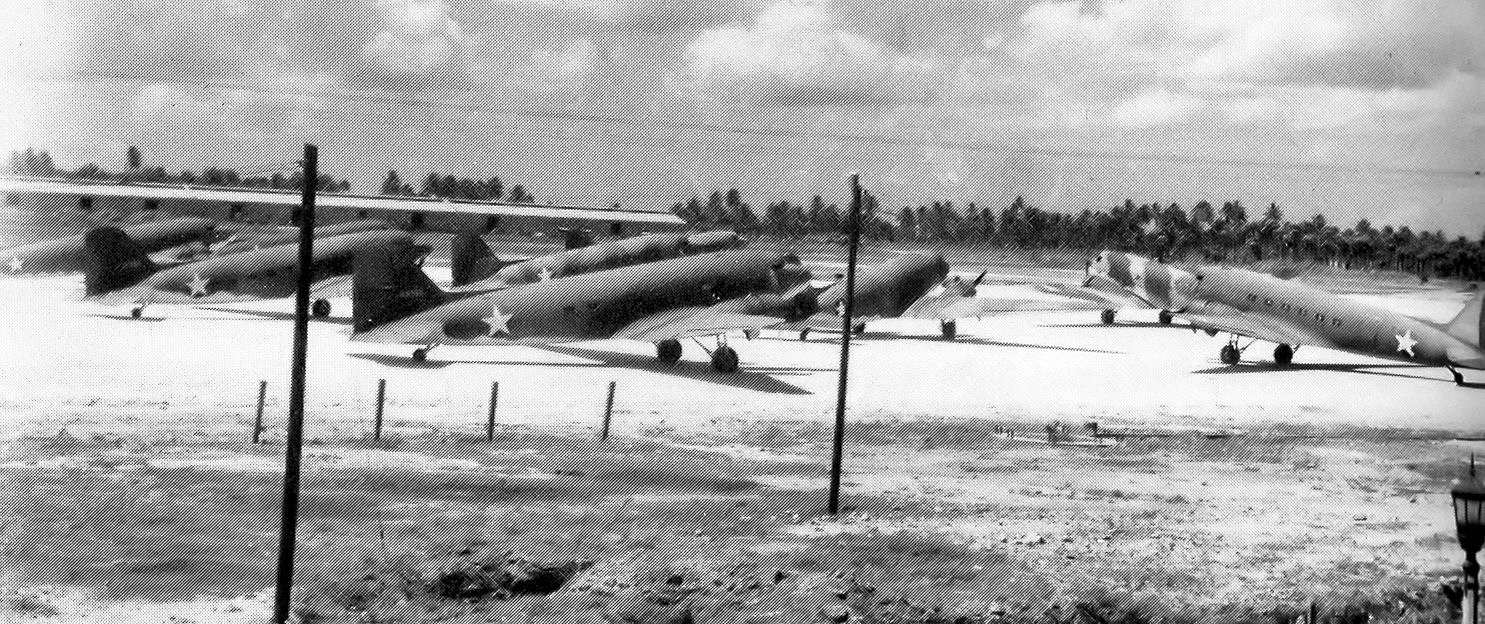
20th Transport Squadron aircraft – Howard Field, Panama, 1943

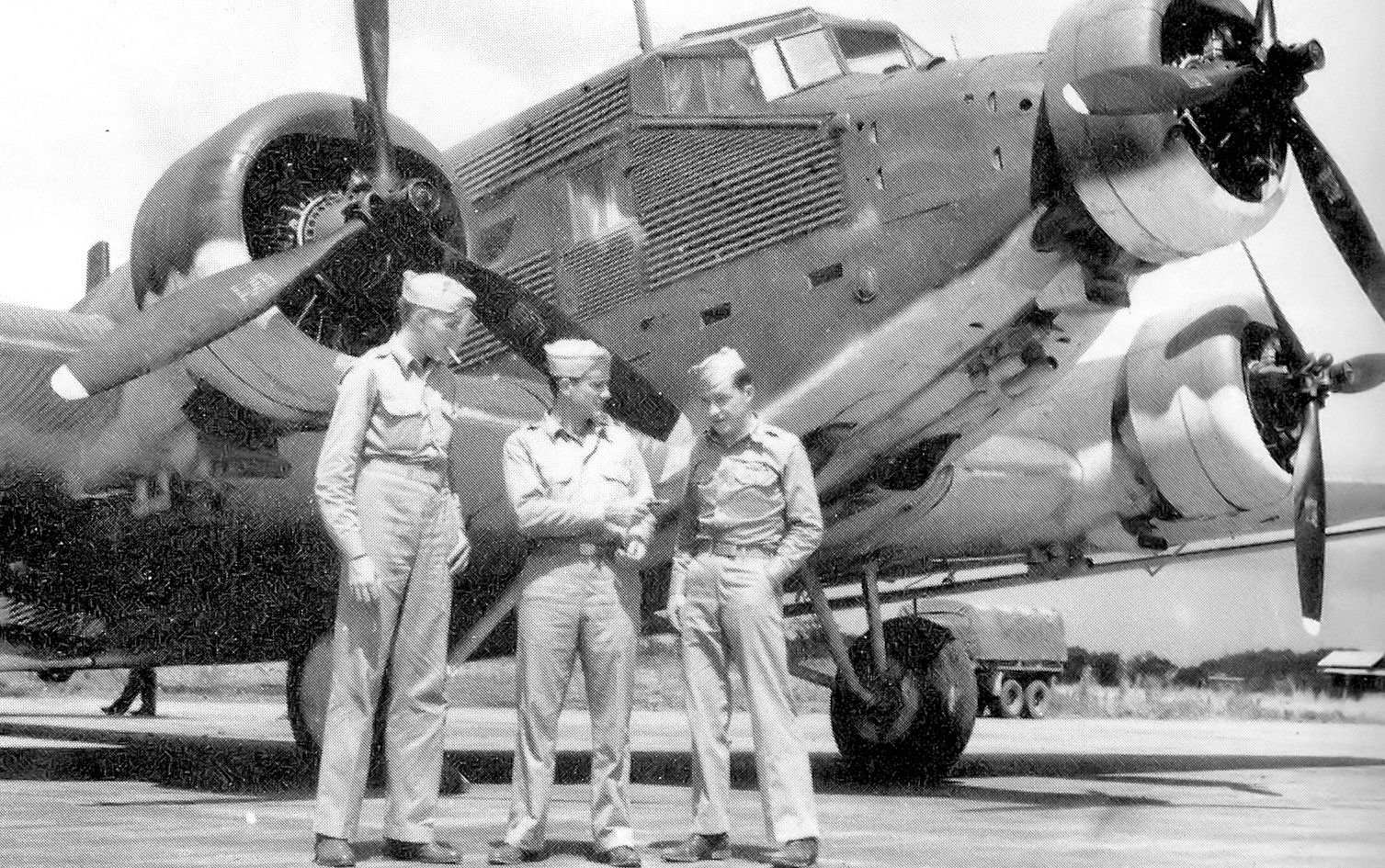
German Junkers Ju 52/3m 42-52883 at Howard Field Zone, late 1942. The aircraft was designated as a C-79 in USAAF service

The 20th Transport Squadron was activated at France Field, Panama Canal Zone, on 15 December 1940, but had only one officer and no airplanes until February 1941. The squadron became operational by March 1941 when the Squadron obtained its first aircraft from France Field's 16th Air Base Squadron, a Douglas C-33. With this solitary aircraft, the Squadron undertook daily flights to Albrook Field and, from there, on to Rio Hato Field and return. By May, the squadron began flying international flights, starting with one to Managua, Nicaragua.

Flying with two or three airplanes, the Squadron began the first of a series of cross-country flights to Trinidad in the British West Indies (some 1,200 air miles east of the Canal Zone) on 2 June 1941 to support the construction of the outer defense ring of air bases in the Caribbean after the United States obtained basing rights as part of the Destroyers for Bases Agreement with the British.

By the time of the Pearl Harbor Attack on 7 December 1941, the unit had received six Douglas C-49s (impressed commercial DC-3s) from the United States. On 22 November 1941, six of the C-49s were detached to Howard Field in the Canal Zone as part of what came to be known as Flight "B" (Reinforced) of the squadron to work with the Army 501st Parachute Battalion and the 550th Airborne Infantry, which were training to act as a rapid deployment force in the Panama Canal defense scheme.

The squadron became the 20th Troop Carrier Squadron in July 1942 and flew many different types of aircraft, several being one of a kind. The Squadron moved from France Field to Howard Field on 19 February 1942. Some aircraft were detached to Waller Field, Trinidad (Flight "A") and Borinquen Field, Puerto Rico (Flight "C"). Flight "A" left the squadron entirely on 22 December 1941 when it was detached to the 92d Air Base Group at Waller Field, Trinidad. The C-47s were followed on 19 June by two Consolidated OA-10 Catalina amphibians (which flew rescue missions in both the Pacific and Caribbean) and a locally procured Stinson C-91. It also flew a single Junkers C-79 trimotor, which was given USAAF serial 42-52883, and a Hamilton UC-89, a former Panamanian registered single-engine plane. These local acquisitions were a measure of the near-desperate need for transport aircraft being felt by the squadron and Sixth Air Force at the time. In March 1943, a pilot was dispatched to Santiago, Chile, to fly an Italian Savoia-Marchetti SM.81 tri-motor (lately of the Italian airline LATI) back to the Canal Zone.

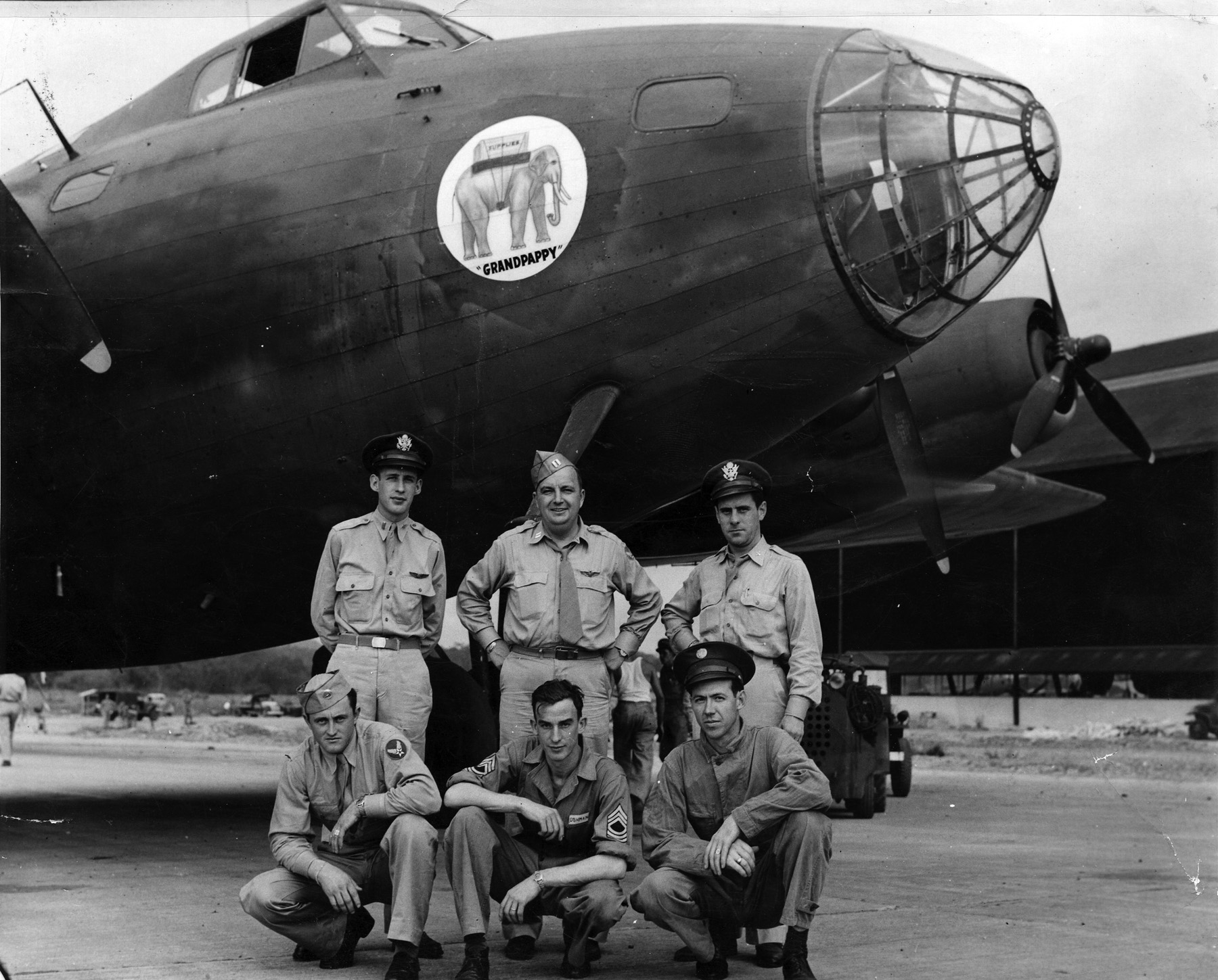
Boeing XB-15 at Howard Field, Panama, 1943. (Note: The aircraft had yet to undergo the modifications that resulted in its designation as the XC-105. It was scrapped in 1945.)

By early 1943, the unit had 30 officers and 234 enlisted. In January 1943, all of the 0A-10's were transferred to other units and the C-79, C-89 and C-91 were all occasionally grounded for extended periods as the ground crews attempted to deal with these non-standard aircraft. By June 1943, all had been reassigned out of the squadron. One replacement aircraft received by the squadron was the huge Boeing XC-105, which was converted from bomber to heavy transport configuration to meet Sixth Air Force's peculiar requirements for long frequent over-water resupply flights to Seymour Field in the Galapagos Islands. But the unit also got the first two Fairchild UC-61 Forwarders, a new Douglas C-47A and conducted long-distance flights with cargo and personnel to resupply and evacuation of the small radar sites spotted around the periphery of the Canal.

As Howard Field became more crowded with bomber units, the squadron moved in June 1943 to Albrook Field. By December 1943, the detachments in the Antilles, which had been leading essentially a separate existence from the "home" based Flight "A" in the Canal Zone, were finally detached from the squadron completely, and became assets of the Antilles Air Command, based at Borinquen Field, Puerto Rico, but dispersed throughout the Antilles. The unit was redesignated as the 20th Troop Carrier Squadron (Special) on 13 November 1943.

By November 1944, the unit had finally started benefiting from the production of transport types in the United States, and could finally approach some semblance of standardization in its fleet. The last year of the war, with the general wind-down of the size and breadth of Sixth Air Force, saw a gradual reduction in the previously hectic flight schedules for 20th crews. By this time, the Squadron had also received some Curtiss C-46 Commandos. Routine transport operations within Panama, South and Central America continued, with a C-47 aiding a forest fire in the Peten region of Guatemala.

=== Postwar operations and Berlin Airlift ===
After the end of the war, the squadron continued to provide transport for Caribbean Air Command, and was equipped with Douglas C-54 Skymasters in 1946. It was attached to the 314th Troop Carrier Group, which moved to Albrook in October 1946. In July 1948, its heavy transports deployed to Germany to assist with the Berlin Airlift.

The 20th moved from Panama to Bergstrom Air Force Base, Texas in September 1948. At Bergstrom, the squadron received Fairchild C-82 Packet medium transports in November 1948 and began transition training. In early January 1949, the squadron's air echelon deployed seven C-82s on temporary duty to Kearney Air Force Base, Nebraska, to transport supplies to snowbound ranchers and farmers, while the rest of the squadron moved at the end of January 1949 to Smyrna Air Force Base, Tennessee. The C-82s and aircrews arrived at Smyrna in late February 1949. While at Smyrna, the 20th trained with U.S. Army paratroopers from Fort Campbell, Kentucky in airborne tactics and carried cargo about the United States. The squadron inactivated on 20 October 1949 and most of its remaining resources were absorbed by the 316th Troop Carrier Group, which activated at Smyrna in November.

=== Combat Operations in Vietnam 1965 to 1973 ===
Media related to 20th Tactical Air Support Squadron (United States Air Force) at Wikimedia Commons

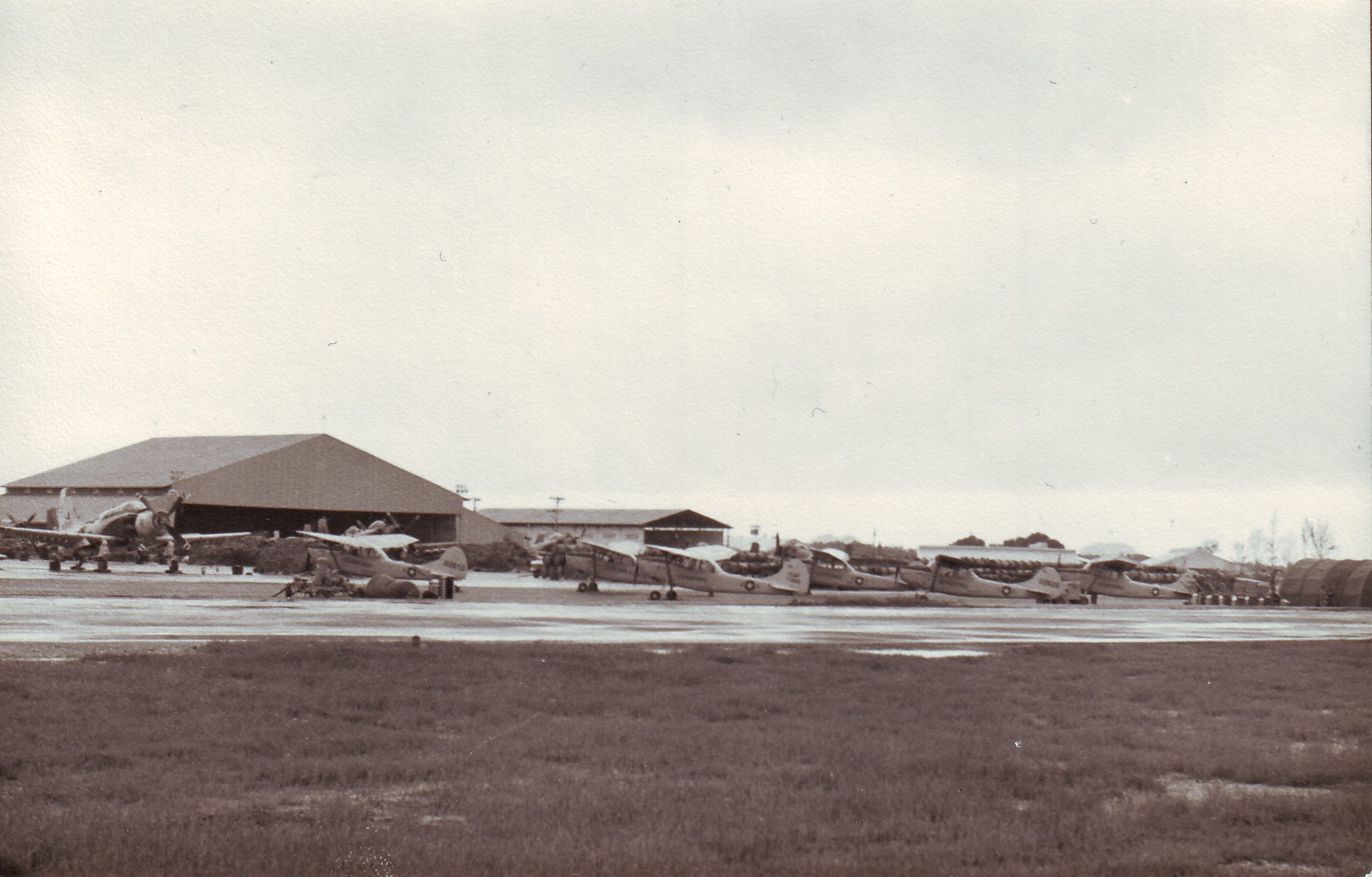
0–1 Bird Dogs, flightline of the 20th Tactical Air Support Squadron at Da Nang Air Base, December 1966.

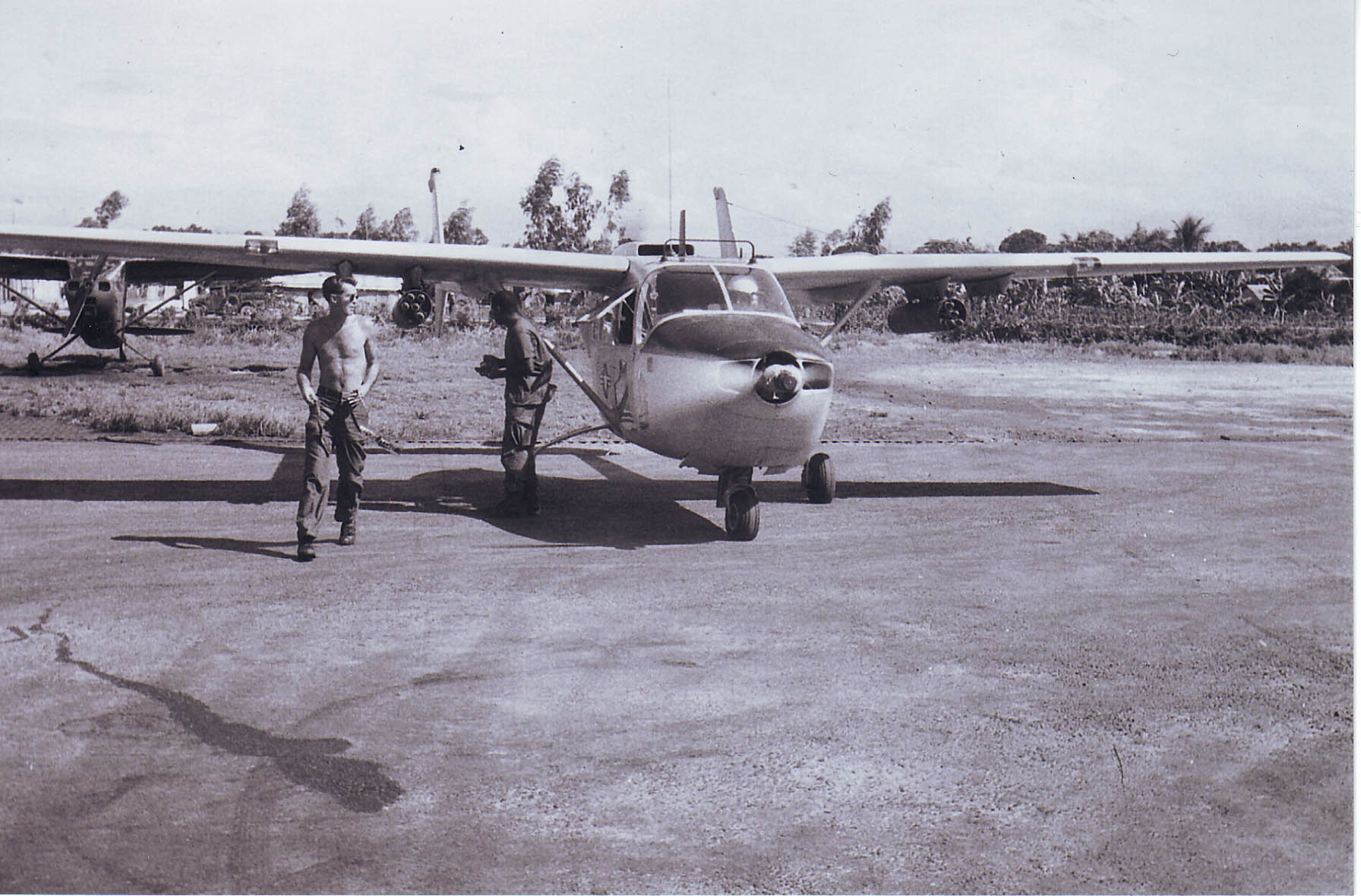
O-2A of the 20th TASS taxiing for takeoff, Huế Citadel Airfield, July 1967.

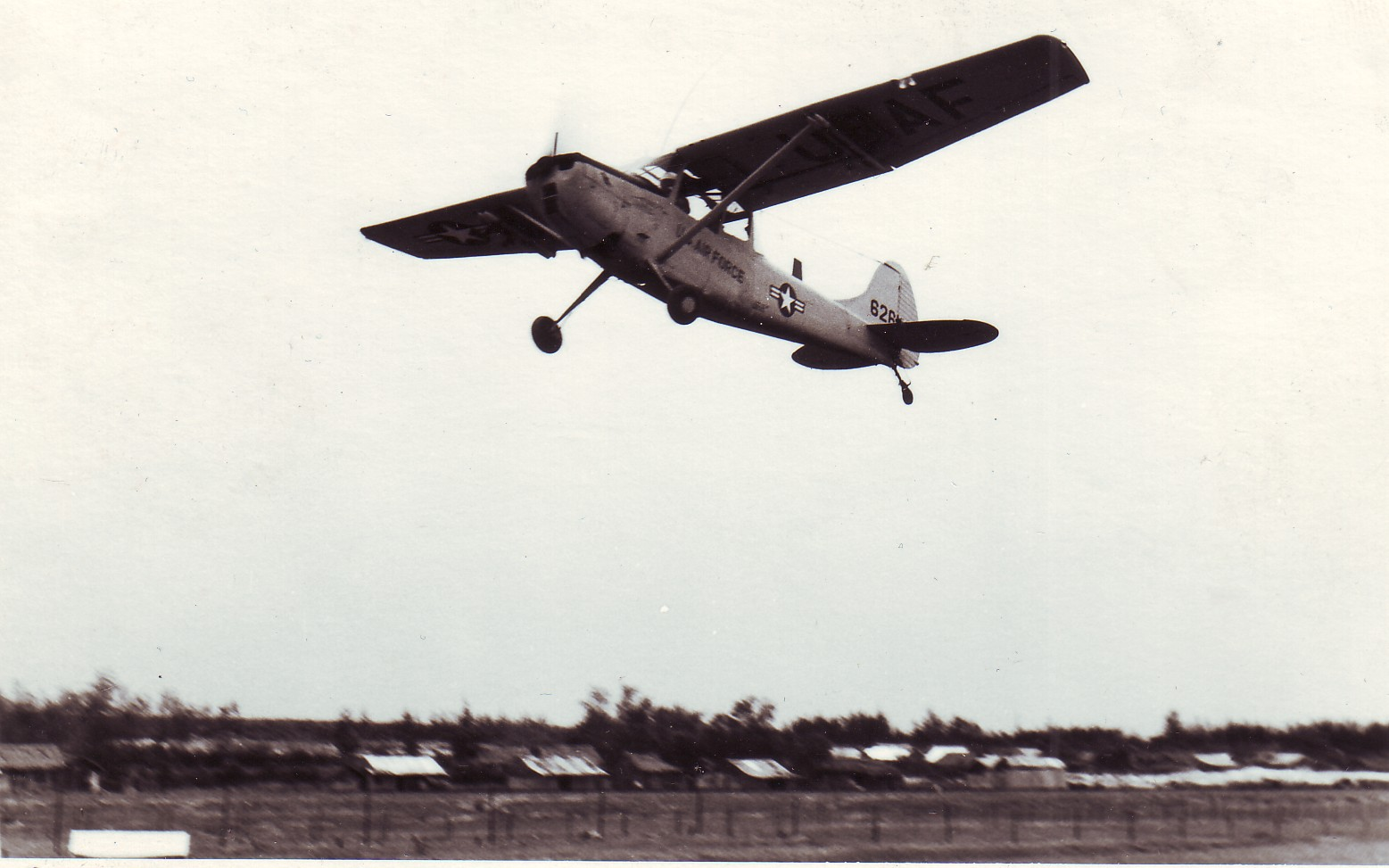
0–1 Bird Dog of the 20th TASS taking off from La Vang Airfield, Quảng Trị Province, August 1967

The 20th Tactical Air Support Squadron was organized at Da Nang Air Base, Vietnam, on 8 May 1965. It received its first Cessna O-1 Bird Dog later that month.

The squadron was fully operational by August 1965. It ran check flights for newly assigned aircrews, as well as flew visual reconnaissance and forward air control missions under various call signs. As it expanded, it stationed pilots and ground crews at several forward operating locations. However, it did not receive its full complement of over 30 Bird Dogs until the end of the year, as the turnover process from the U. S. Army was a slow one. The army was reluctant to surrender the Forward Air Control (FAC) role, but had agreed to do so under an inter-service agreement that allowed them to have helicopters.

By the end of 1965, the 20th TASS was assigned the mission of directing interdiction of the Ho Chi Minh trail; this was dubbed Operation Tiger Hound. The squadron's original forward operating bases were at Khe Sanh, Kham Duc, and Kon Tum, which were very close to the Ho Chi Minh Trail, unlike Da Nang, which was the width of the country away. Other forward sites were added later for additional missions assigned to the squadron – Đông Hà, Quảng Trị City (La Vang Airfield), Huế Citadel Airfield, Huế/Phú Bài, Tam Kỳ, Quảng Ngãi, Đắk Tô, Pleiku, and Quảng Trị Combat Base.

In July 1966, the squadron was tasked with a second area of operations. It was within North Vietnam, from the Demilitarized Zone 30 miles northward along Route Pack 1. These Operation Tally Ho missions directed naval gunfire as well as airstrikes. However, burgeoning antiaircraft defenses pushed the squadron's minimum operating level to 2,500 above ground level. By year's end, the risk had so increased that the squadron's Bird Dogs were withdrawn in favor of A-1 Skyraider FACs. During this period, it was decided that all cross-border flights would use call sign "Covey" and "Tally Ho" was dropped. In-country missions carried a variety of call signs, including "Jake" and "Trail".

By this time, the Bird Dog's shortcomings were becoming apparent. It was a simple plane, easily maintained, highly maneuverable, and had good visibility. The fore and aft seating allowed both pilot and observer good views on both sides, and the high wing allowed a nearly unobstructed panorama. Vietnam People's Army and Viet Cong antiaircraft defenses were increasingly sophisticated and dangerous, however, and the slow, unarmored O-1 was ever more vulnerable to ground fire. In addition, its operational times were limited by its unsophisticated instrumentation and navigational equipment, which made flying in bad weather or at night difficult (night missions were particularly challenging and dangerous). Its lack of weaponry was also frustrating, as FACs could watch the enemy disappear while the strike aircraft were still en route. Frustrated FACs sometimes resorted to strafing the enemy with M-16 rifles fired out of the plane's windows.

As a result, the 20th TASS began receiving Cessna O-2 Skymasters in 1967. The O-2 was a temporary solution, meant to serve until the OV-10 Bronco came on line. The O-2 was a modified Cessna 337 civilian plane. It was dual engined, with one engine at either end of the fuselage. The 20th was the first FAC squadron in Vietnam to receive it. The aircraft carried more ordnance, was capable of longer loiter times, had more power, and featured improved conventional navigation aids and in-flight instrumentation. Nevertheless, it had its own limitations. During this period, the squadron continued to fly 0-1s.

In January 1969, the squadron began the transition from O-1s to the OV-10 Bronco. By July, the last O-1 was history, though the squadron continued to fly 0-2s. As of October 1969, 20th TASS aircraft, pilots and ground crews were assigned to 11 forward locations, five supporting the U. S. Army and six supporting the ARVN. Its headquarters remained at Da Nang.

As the war wound down from 1970 through 1972, the squadron withdrew from its forward locations. The Easter Offensive by the PAVN in April 1972 made the 20th TASS return to FAC support from forward locations. It also temporarily tripled the squadron's sortie rate. When the North Vietnamese began to rocket Da Nang, the pilots of the 20th used their armed OV-10s to retaliate directly with rockets, strafing, and small bombs in addition to calling in air strikes.

In January 1973, the squadron ceased combat. It turned over its O-2s to the Republic of Vietnam Air Force and passed its Broncos along to other USAF units. On 15 January, the 20th was transferred as a paper unit to George Air Force Base, California. On 1 April 1973, it was inactivated and its service in Vietnam was over. In its nearly eight years in Vietnam, it had earned five Presidential Unit Citations, four Air Force Outstanding Unit Awards with Combat "V" Device, and three Republic of Vietnam Gallantry Crosses with Palm. In addition, its pilots and crews earned many personal decorations.

==== Losses and awards for Gallantry in Action ====
The 20th lost more than 70 pilots during the Vietnam War.

On 19 August 1967, Captain Donald D. Stevens, flying an O–2, risked heavy ground fire, which damaged his aircraft, for eight hours during the medical evacuation of a wounded American soldier and the extraction of a ground team sent in to help him. His gallantry won him the Air Force Cross.

Four months later, on Christmas Day, Major Jerry Allan Sellers was killed when his O–2 was shot down during a night mission in which he saved a ground patrol from being overrun by illuminating ground targets with his landing lights so that gunships could direct accurate fire at the enemy. His lights drew heavy anti-aircraft fire, and he was shot down. He also earned an Air Force Cross.

On 29 June 1972, Captain Steven L. Bennett's OV-10 was hit by a surface-to-air missile shredding the Observer's parachute. Rather than leave his observer to his fate, Bennett crash landed in the Tonkin Gulf. The observer escaped the sinking plane, but Bennett drowned. He was awarded the Medal of Honor, one of only two awarded to FACs in the war.

On 11 July 1972 Major John Leonard Carroll a 20th TASS pilot on temporary duty with the 56th Special Operations Wing at Nakhon Phanom Royal Thai Air Force Base and flying an O-1G Bird Dog as a Raven FAC, earned the squadron's third Air Force Cross. His aircraft was shot down over the Plaine des Jarres, Xiang Khoang Province Laos, and he was killed on the ground shooting it out with two PAVN companies attempting to capture him.

The squadron's aircraft losses over the course of the war amounted to 31 O-1 Bird Dogs, 55 Cessna O-2 Skymasters, and 22 OV10 Broncos.

=== Post Vietnam Operations ===
On 1 October 1973 the 20th TASS activated at Wiesbaden Air Base, West Germany, to provide forward tactical air control for U.S. Army, Europe, and Seventh Army operations. The squadron had only three 0-2A aircraft available until July 1974, when it began flying OV-10A aircraft. Engaged in close air support training during USAFE, NATO, and U.S. Army exercises, its pilots served as both ground and airborne forward air controllers. During training exercises, the 20th deployed to and flew from bases in Italy, Spain, Denmark, Turkey, England, Belgium, West Germany, and The Netherlands. In January 1976, the squadron moved with the 601st Tactical Control Wing to Sembach Air Base, West Germany. In May 1981, it added search and rescue missions to its tasks. In 1984, it lost all OV-10 aircraft, squadron aircrews ferrying them to George AFB, Calif, June–August 1984. squadron inactivated on 30 September 1984.

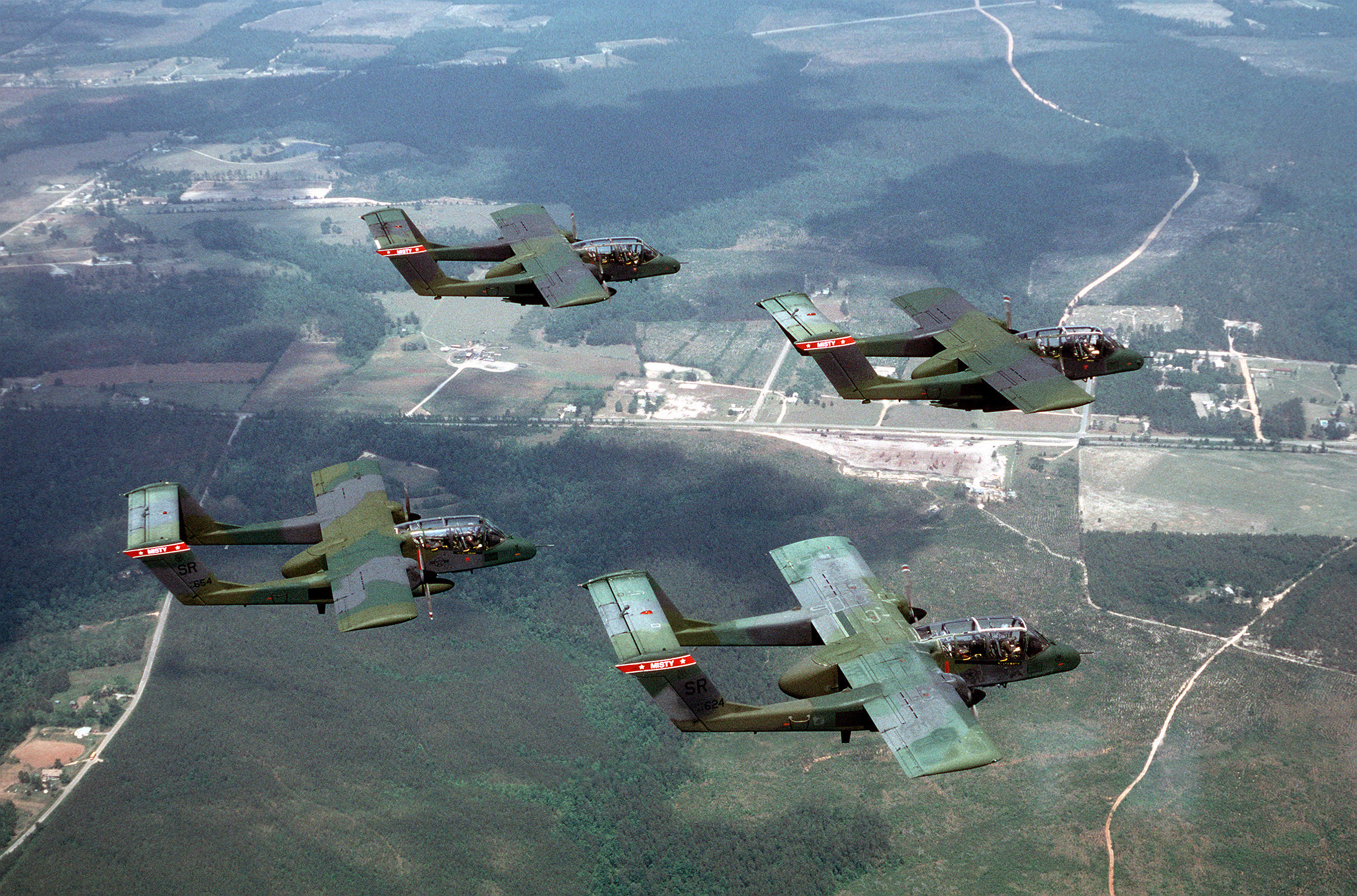
20th TASS OV-10 Broncos flying in formation at Shaw AFB in 1990

The 20th TASS was activated again on 1 April 1990 at Shaw AFB, South Carolina, as part of the 507th Tactical Air Control Wing, it was inactivated 31 December 1991.

=== Unmanned aerial vehicle operations ===
The USAF again activated the unit as the 20th Reconnaissance Squadron on 1 January 2011 at Whiteman Air Force Base, Missouri. A geographically separated unit, the squadron is assigned to the 432d Operations Group of the 432d Wing, both of which are located at Creech Air Force Base, Nevada. The activation ceremony for the squadron, held on 14 January 2011 at Whiteman, was attended by Ms. Angela Bennett-Engele, daughter of 20th Tactical Air Support Squadron Medal of Honor recipient Capt. Steven L. Bennett and her family.

The 20th Reconnaissance Squadron flew the General Atomics MQ-1 Predator remotely piloted aircraft on missions that include route reconnaissance, target marking, on-scene commander, intelligence-surveillance-and-reconnaissance, close air support and generally providing eyes, ears, and voice above the battlefield. In May 2016, the squadron was redesignated the 20th Attack Squadron, reflecting its growing primary role in close air support of US coalition forces.

In October 2016, the 20th Attack Squadron began its transition to the General Atomics MQ-9 Reaper, flying its first combat mission in January 2017 while keeping the squadron involved in combat. The 20th Attack Squadron continued to fly the General Atomics MQ-1 Predator supporting both aircraft until 30 June 2017, when it flew its last combat mission with the Predator.

== Lineage ==
20th Troop Carrier Squadron

- Constituted as the 20th Transport Squadron on 22 November 1940.

Activated on 15 December 1940
Redesignated 20th Troop Carrier Squadron on 5 July 1942
Redesignated 20th Troop Carrier Squadron (Special) on 13 November 1943
Redesignated 20th Troop Carrier Squadron on 12 April 1944
Redesignated 20th Troop Carrier Squadron, Heavy on 17 June 1948
Redesignated 20th Troop Carrier Squadron, Medium on 4 October 1948
Inactivated on 20 October 1949

- Consolidated with the 20th Tactical Air Support Squadron as the 20th Tactical Air Support Squadron on 19 September 1985. (remained inactive)

20th Attack Squadron

- Constituted as the 20th Tactical Air Support Squadron (Light) and activated, on 26 April 1965 (not organized)
- Organized on 8 May 1965

Inactivated on 1 April 1973
Redesignated 20th Tactical Air Support Squadron, and activated on 1 October 1973.
Inactivated on 30 September 1984

- Consolidated with the 20th Troop Carrier Squadron on 19 September 1985. (remained inactive)
- Activated on 1 April 1990

Inactivated 31 December 1991

- Redesignated 20th Reconnaissance Squadron on 20 December 2010
- Activated on 1 January 2011
- Redesignated 20th Attack Squadron on 15 May 2016

=== Assignments ===
- Panama Canal Department, 15 December 1940
- Panama Air Depot, 1 February 1941
- 6th Air Force Base Command (later 6th Air Force Service Command, VI Air Force Service Command), 5 June 1942
- Panama Air Depot, 1 December 1944
- Sixth Air Force (later Caribbean Air Command), 5 May 1945 (attached to 314th Troop Carrier Group after c. November 1946)
- 314th Troop Carrier Group, 17 June 1948 – 20 October 1949 (detachment attached to United States Air Forces in Europe 1 – 29 July 1948, Airlift Task Force (Provisional) 29 July – 19 October 1948)
- Pacific Air Forces, 26 April 1965 (not organized)
- 2d Air Division, 8 May 1965 (attached to Tactical Air Support Group, Provisional, 6250th 1 August-7 November 1965)
- 505th Tactical Control Group, 8 November 1965 (attached to Tactical Air Support Group, Provisional, 6250th 1–8 September 1966 and Tactical Air Support Group, Provisional, 6253d, 9 September-7 December 1966)
- 504th Tactical Air Support Group, 8 December 1966
- 366th Tactical Fighter Wing, 15 March 1972
- 6498th Air Base Wing, 27 June 1972
- 71st Tactical Air Support Group, 15 January-1 April 1973
- 601st Tactical Air Support Group, 1 October 1973
- 601st Tactical Control Wing, 1 November 1975
- 601st Tactical Air Support Group, 1 May 1977 – 30 September 1984
- 507th Tactical Air Control Wing, 1 April 1990 – 31 December 1991
- 432d Wing, 1 January 2011 – present

=== Stations ===
- France Field, Panama Canal Zone, 15 December 1940
- Howard Field, Panama Canal Zone, 19 February 1942;
- Albrook Field (later, Albrook Air Force Base), Panama Canal Zone, 9 June 1943 – 20 September 1948
- Bergstrom Air Force Base, Texas, 4 October 1948
- Da Nang Air Base, South Vietnam, 8 May 1965 – 15 January 1973
- George Air Force Base, California, 15 January-1 April 1973.
- Wiesbaden Air Base, West Germany, 1 October 1973
- Sembach Air Base, West Germany, 8 January 1976 – 30 September 1984
- Shaw Air Force Base, South Carolina, 1 April 1990 – 31 December 1991
- Whiteman Air Force Base, Missouri, 1 January 2011 – present

=== Aircraft ===
- Douglas C-33, 1941
- Douglas C-39, 1941–1944
- Douglas C-49, 1941–1944
- Douglas C-47 Skytrain, 1942–1948, 1949
- Consolidated OA-10 Catalina, 1942–1943, 1943–1945
- Stinson C-91, 1942–1943
- Junkers C-79, 1942–1943
- Hamilton UC-89, 1942–1943
- Douglas C-38, 1942–1943
- Boeing XB-15 (later XC-105), 1943–1944
- Stinson L-1 Vigilant, 1943–1945
- North American BC-1, 1943–1944
- Piper L-4 Grasshopper, 1943–1944
- Fairchild UC-61 Forwarder, 1943–1945
- Beechcraft C-45 Expeditor, 1944–1945
- Curtiss C-46 Commando, 1945–1947
- Douglas C-54 Skymaster, 1946–1948
- Fairchild C-82 Packet, 1948–1949
- Waco CG-15, 1949
- Cessna O-1 Bird Dog, 1965–1969
- Cessna O-2 Skymaster, 1967–1973, 1973–1974
- North American OV-10 Bronco, 1969–1973, 1974–1984, 1990–1991
- General Atomics MQ-1 Predator, 2011–2017
- General Atomics MQ-9 Reaper, 2017–present
