= La Vang Base =

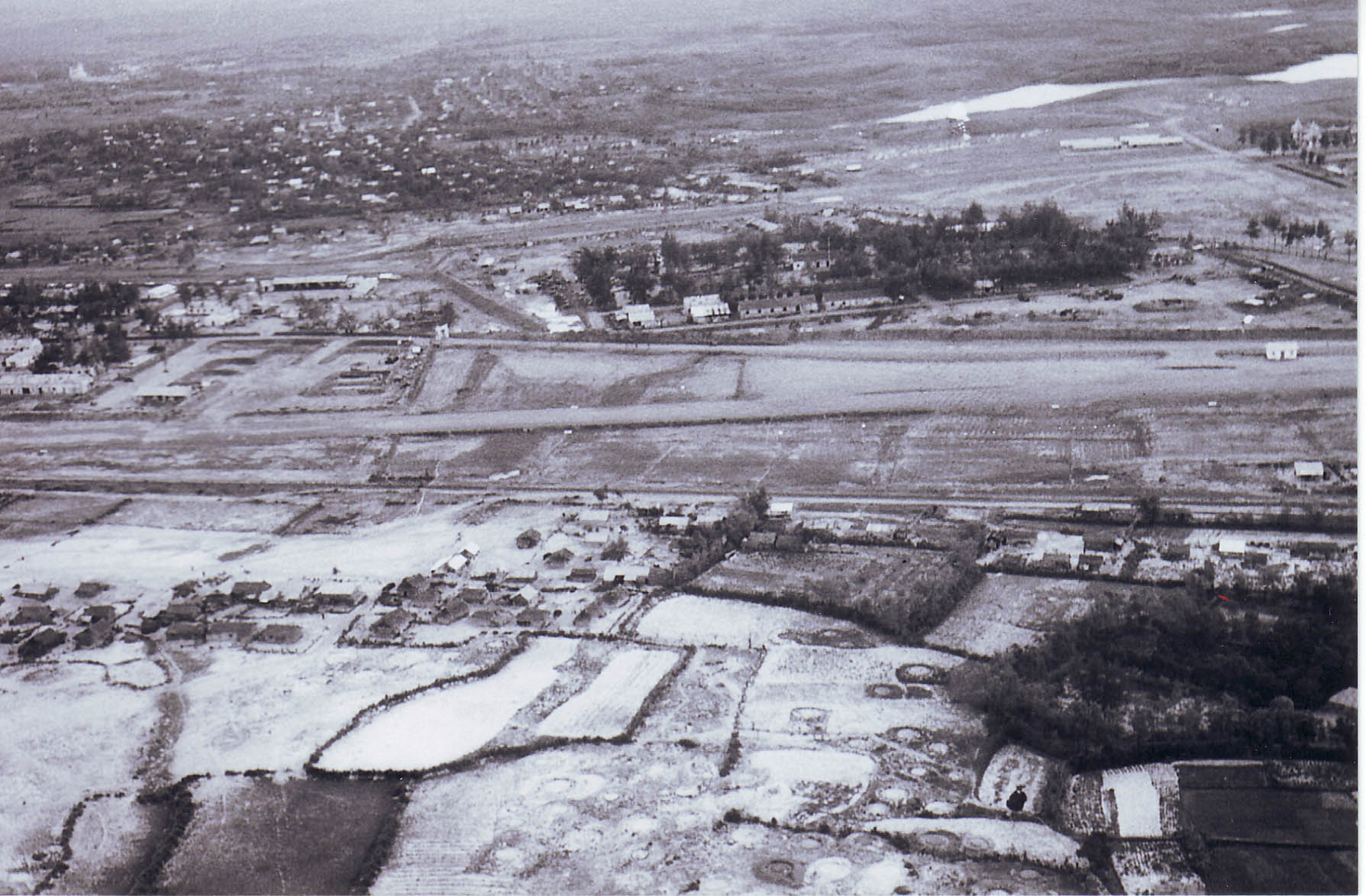
- La Vang Base, 1967

Site information
- Type: Army

Location
- Coordinates: 16.73°N 107.188°E

Site history
- Built: 1966
- In use: 1966–1972
- Battles/wars: Battle of Quang Tri (1968); Second Battle of Quảng Trị

Garrison information
- Garrison: 1st Regiment, 1st Division (South Vietnam)

La Vang Base (also known as La Vang Combat Base or Firebase La Vang) is a former Army of the Republic of Vietnam (ARVN) base near Quảng Trị, Vietnam.

== History ==
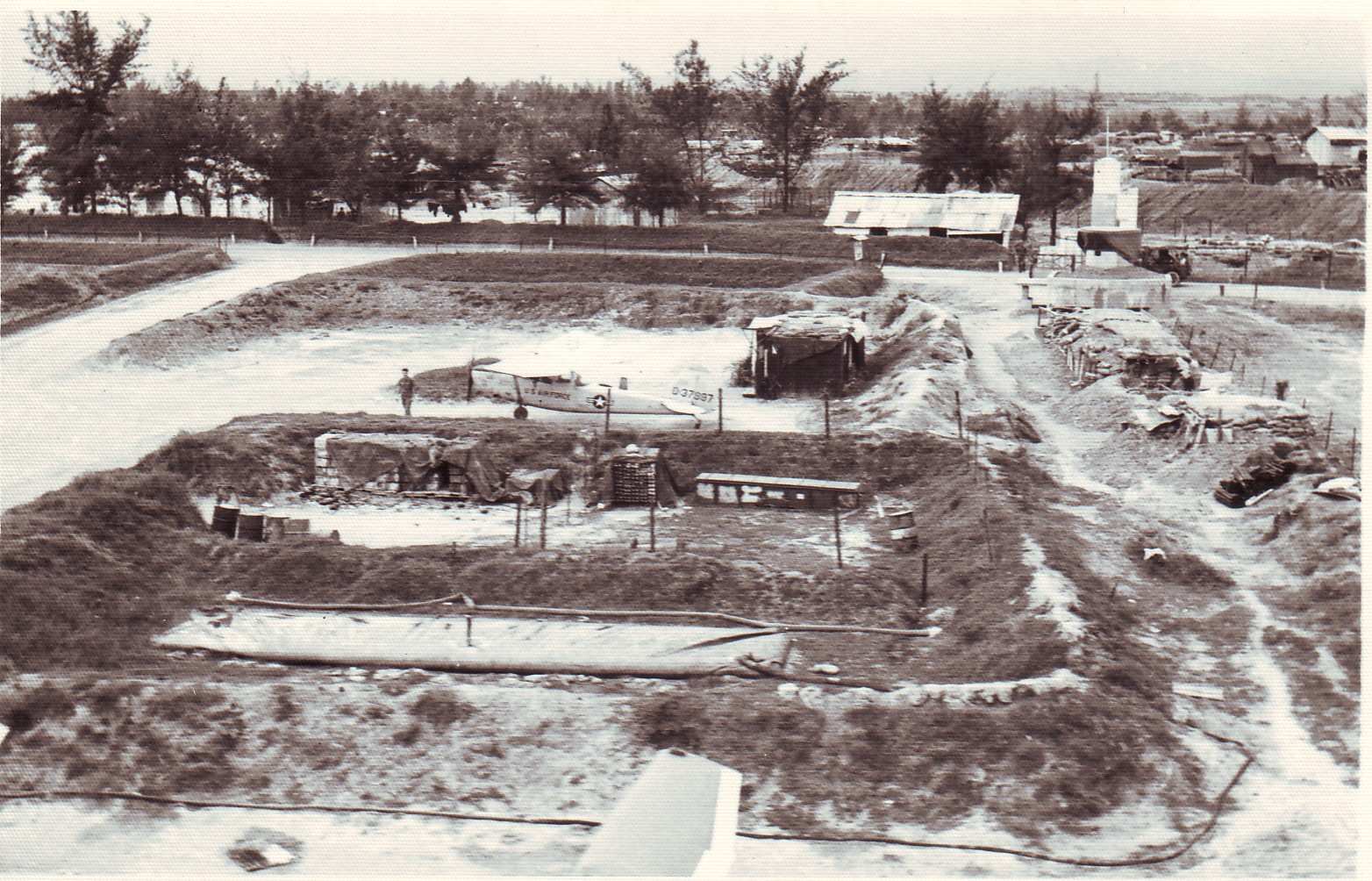
La Vang Airfield parking area, March 1968

The base was located in La Vang, 2km south of Quảng Trị beside Highway 1.

The base was used by the ARVN 1st Regiment, 1st Division.

Cessna O-1 Bird Dog observation and Forward Air Control aircraft of the 20th Tactical Air Support Squadron used the airfield at La Vang as a forward operating base, with 4 aircraft usually operating there by 1968.

On 20 January 1968 the 3rd Marine Regiment established their command post at the base as they took over responsibility for Operation Osceola. Other US units at the base were the 1st Battalion, 1st Marines, a 105mm artillery battery of the 3rd Battalion, 12th Marines, a provisional 155mm artillery battery and M42 Dusters of Battery A, 1st Battalion, 44th Artillery. As part of Operation Jeb Stuart the 1st Brigade, 1st Cavalry Division was to assume responsibility for the 3rd Marine Regiment area and take over the La Vang Base. On 27 January the 3rd Marines moved from La Vang to Quảng Trị Combat Base.

On 31 January 1968 during the Tet Offensive, the People's Army of Vietnam (PAVN) K6 Battalion attempted to attack the base as part of the assault on Quảng Trị, however they ran into two ARVN Airborne companies forestalling the attack. By dawn the ARVN at La Vang were able to start moving north to engage the PAVN forces in and around Quảng Trị despite sporadic mortar and rocket fire and sapper attacks on the base.
