= Tay Loc Airfield =

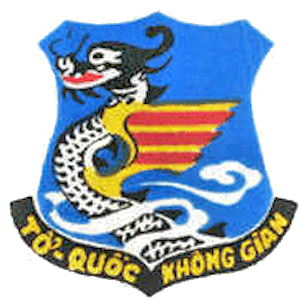
Tây Lộc Airfield
- Part of Republic of Vietnam Air Force (VNAF); Pacific Air Forces (USAF)
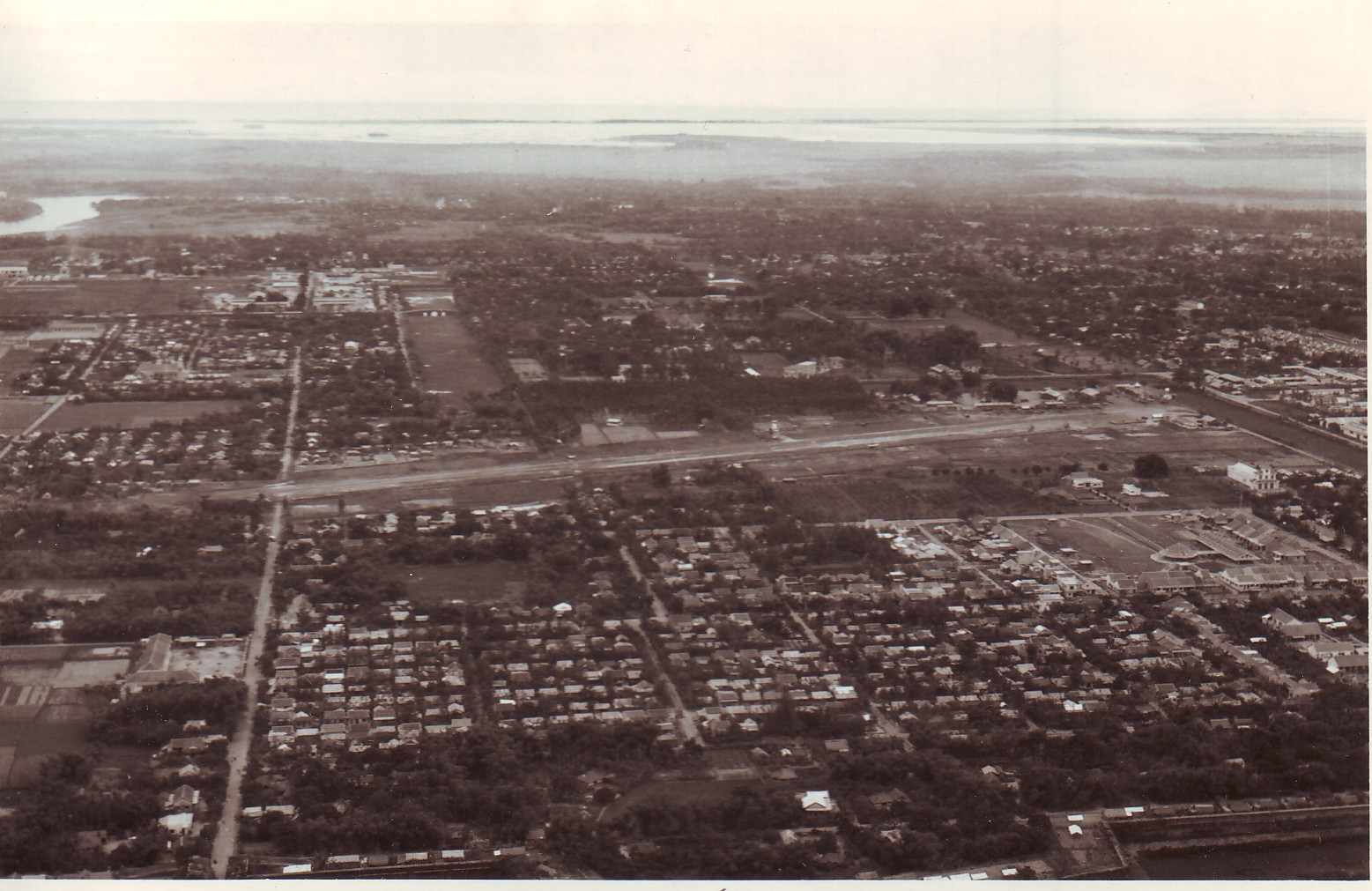
- Tây Lộc Airfield, July 1967

Site information
- Type: Airfield
- Condition: abandoned

Location
- Location within Vietnam
- Coordinates: 16°28′28″N 107°34′23″E

Site history
- Built: 1930s
- In use: 1930s-75
- Battles/wars: Vietnam War; Battle of Huế

Airfield information
- IATA: none; ICAO: VVHU

Summary
- Elevation AMSL: 5 ft (1.5 m)
- Interactive map of Airfield information

Runways
Direction	Length		Surface
Direction	ft	m	Surface
12/30	2,400	732	crushed rock

Tây Lộc Airfield (also known as Huế Citadel Airfield) was a former United States Air Force (USAF), U.S. Army and Republic of Vietnam Air Force (RVNAF) airfield located within the Huế Citadel in Huế, Vietnam.

== History ==
The airfield was originally built in the 1930s by the French to serve as the airfield for Bảo Đại, the last Emperor of Vietnam.

USAF units based at Tây Lộc included:

- 20th Tactical Air Support Squadron (20th TASS) detachments

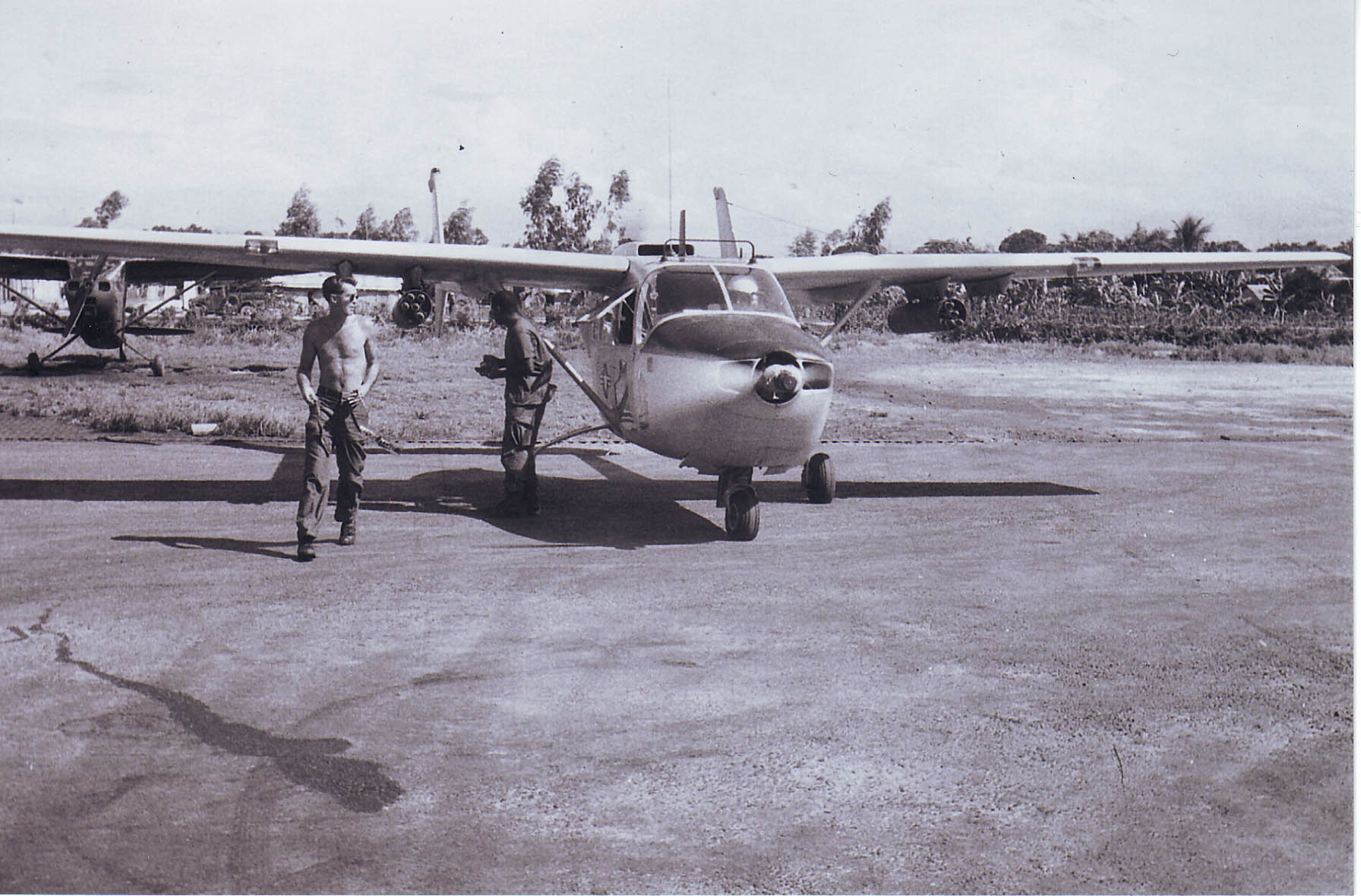
O-2A of the 20th TASS taxiing for takeoff, Huế Citadel Airfield, July 1967

US Army units based at Tây Lộc included:

- 220th Aviation Company

VNAF units based at Tây Lộc included:

- 219th Squadron Kingbees

=== Battle of Huế ===
In the early morning of 31 January 1968 at the start of the Battle of Huế, the People's Army of Vietnam (PAVN) 800th Battalion of the 6th Regiment attacked the airfield which was defended by the Army of Vietnam (ARVN) "Black Panther" Reconnaissance Company of the 1st Division. The fight for control of the airfield continued until dawn when 1st Division commander General Ngô Quang Trưởng called the Black Panthers back to defend the 1st Division headquarters in the northeast corner of the Citadel. All aircraft at the airfield were destroyed in the fighting including 4 newly delivered O-2s. The airfield was recaptured on 3 February by the ARVN 3rd Infantry Regiment and 7th Armored Cavalry Squadron.

== Current use ==
The airfield is now covered with housing while the former runway is now La Sơn Phu Tử road. The airfield's former control tower remains in a park area by the road.
