= Donald V. Rattan =

United States Army general (1924–2017)

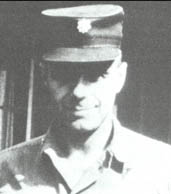
- Lieutenant Colonel Rattan in 1964
- Born: September 12, 1924; Fort Benning, Georgia, United States
- Died: March 8, 2017 (aged 92); San Antonio, Texas, United States
- Burial place: Fort Sam Houston National Cemetery, Texas, United States
- Military career
- Allegiance: United States
- Branch: United States Army
- Service years: 1945–1979
- Rank: Major General
- Nickname: Snapper
- Unit: Infantry Branch
- Commands: Fifth United States Army (acting); 8th Infantry Division; 1st Brigade, 1st Cavalry Division
- Conflicts: Vietnam War
- Awards: Silver Star

Donald Volney Rattan (September 12, 1924 – March 8, 2017) was a major general in the United States Army who commanded the 8th Infantry Division from August 1970 until May 1972.

== Early life and education ==
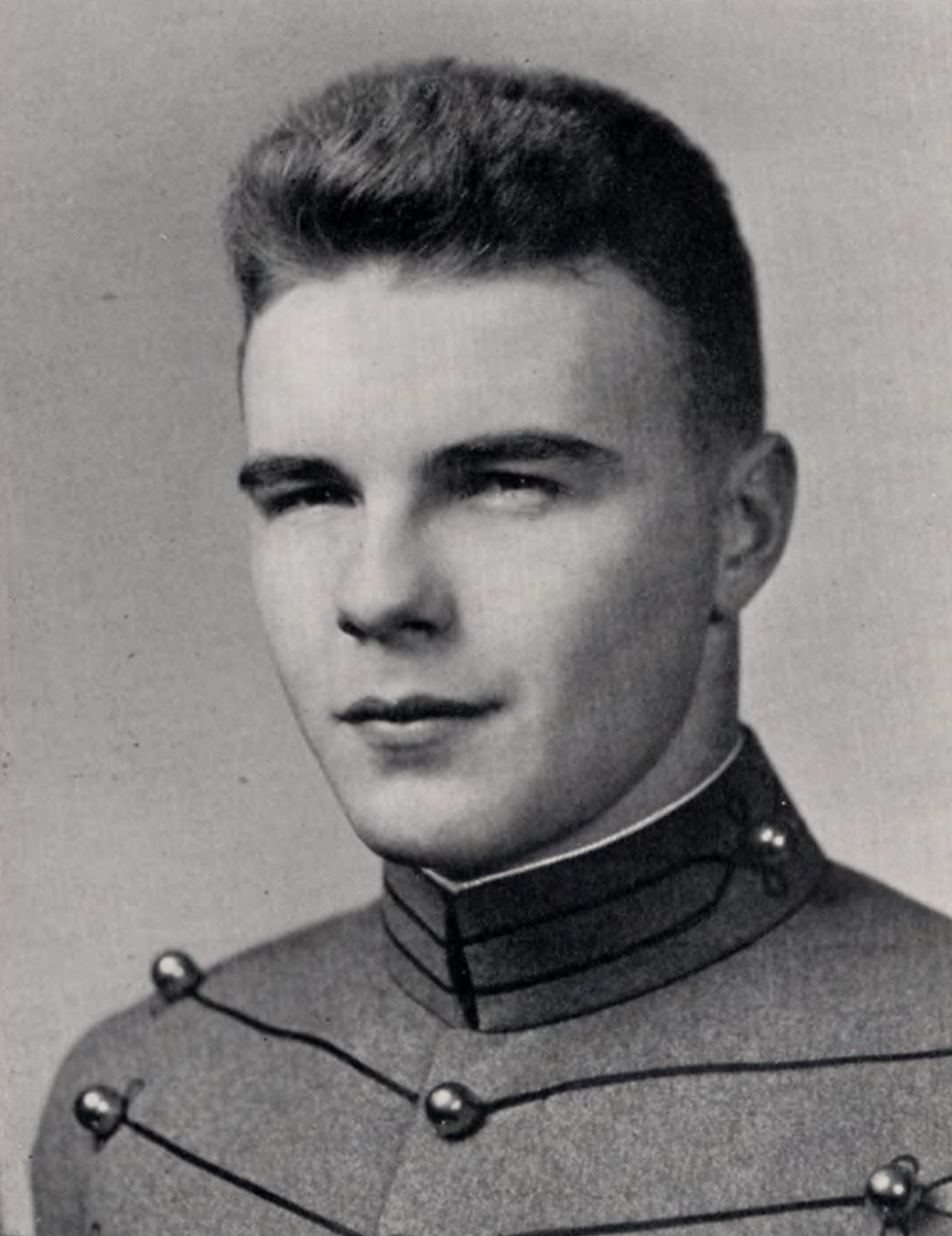
At West Point in 1945

Rattan was born at Fort Benning, Georgia on 12 September 1924 to William Volney Rattan, an Infantry officer, and Rose Harriett Ross.

== Career ==
Rattan attended the United States Military Academy graduating in the class of 1945.

In May 1960 then Lieutenant Colonel Rattan wrote "Antiguerrilla Operations: A Case Study from History" a study of U.S. Cavalry General George Crook's Indian War campaigns of the 1870s which was published in the United States Army Command and General Staff College journal Military Review.

In August 1964, LCol Rattan was serving with the US Consulate in Bukavu in eastern Congo where he advised Government forces in the defense of the city during the Simba rebellion and in the rescue of western hostages in Operation Dragon Rouge.

=== Vietnam War ===
Col. Rattan served as commander of the 1st Brigade, 1st Cavalry Division from April 1967 to March 1968. In November 1967 the 1st Brigade was placed under the operational control of the 4th Infantry Division and saw combat at the Battle of Dak To. In late January 1968, following the transfer of the entire 1st Cavalry Division north to I Corps he led the brigade in the successful defense of Quảng Trị City during the Tet Offensive.

=== Post Vietnam ===
Rattan was promoted to Major General and commanded the 8th Infantry Division from August 1970 until May 1972.

== Death ==
Rattan died on 8 March 2017 in San Antonio, Texas and was buried at Fort Sam Houston National Cemetery.

Military offices
Preceded by John J. Hennessey	Commander of the United States Fifth Army; Acting; 1974–1975	Succeeded by Allen M. Burdett Jr.
