= Vân Khánh (singer) =

Vietnamese singer

- Born: Trần Thị Vân Khánh; April 25, 1978 (age 48); Quảng Trị, Vietnam
- Origin: Quảng Trị
- Genres: Folk music; Nhạc trữ tình; Nhạc đỏ
- Occupation: Singer
- Instrument: Vocal
- Years active: 1992–present

Trần Thị Vân Khánh (born 25 April 1978 in Quảng Trị) is a Vietnamese traditional folk singer. She began as a child artist with a family troupe at the age of 12. Her albums have helped to popularize Central Vietnam's folk music with urban audiences in Ho Chi Minh City.

== Albums ==
- "Bông lau Trắng”
- "Thương Huế mùa đông”
- "Tưởng như Huế trong lòng”
- "Huế xưa”
- "Một thời Tôn Nữ”
- "Thương mãi câu hò"
- "Hoài niệm trường giang"
- "Huế ngày trở về"
- "Đêm phương nam nghe câu hò huế"
- "Con đường mang tên em"
- "VCD Vẫn là Em"
- "CD-DVD Chỉ là Mơ thôi"
- singer on "Hotel Vietnam" by Japan's Blue Asia band. King Records
