= Battle of Quang Tri (1968) =

1968 battle of the Vietnam War

Battle of Quảng Trị
- Part of the Vietnam War
Date	31 January – 6 February 1968
Location	Quảng Trị Province, South Vietnam 16°44′25″N 107°11′15″E
Result	South Vietnamese-American victory

Belligerents
Viet Cong; North Vietnam	South Vietnam; United States

Commanders and leaders
	(South Vietnam) Ngô Quang Trưởng (United States) Donald V. Rattan

Units involved
(North Vietnam) 812th Regiment, 324B Division, reinforced (North Vietnam) 54th Artillery Regiment (122mm rocket BN) (North Vietnam) 10th Sapper Battalion (one platoon) 814th Main Force Battalion 808th Main Force Battalion	(South Vietnam) 1st Infantry Division: 1st Regiment; 2nd Troop, 7th Cavalry; (South Vietnam) Airborne Division: 9th Airborne Battalion; (United States) 1st Brigade, 1st Cavalry Division (United States) MACV Advisory Team 4

Strength
~2,600	~2,700; Air Forces support

Casualties and losses
U.S claim: 914 killed 86 captured	Unknown

The Battle for Quang Tri occurred in and around Quảng Trị City (Quảng Trị Province), the northernmost provincial capital of South Vietnam during the Tet Offensive when the Vietcong (VC) and People's Army of Vietnam (PAVN) attacked Army of the Republic of Vietnam (ARVN) and American forces across major cities and towns in South Vietnam in an attempt to force the Saigon government to collapse. This included several attacks across northern I Corps, most importantly at Huế, Da Nang and Quảng Trị City. After being put on the defensive in the city of Quảng Trị, the Allied forces regrouped and forced the PAVN/VC out of the town after a day of fighting.

== Background ==
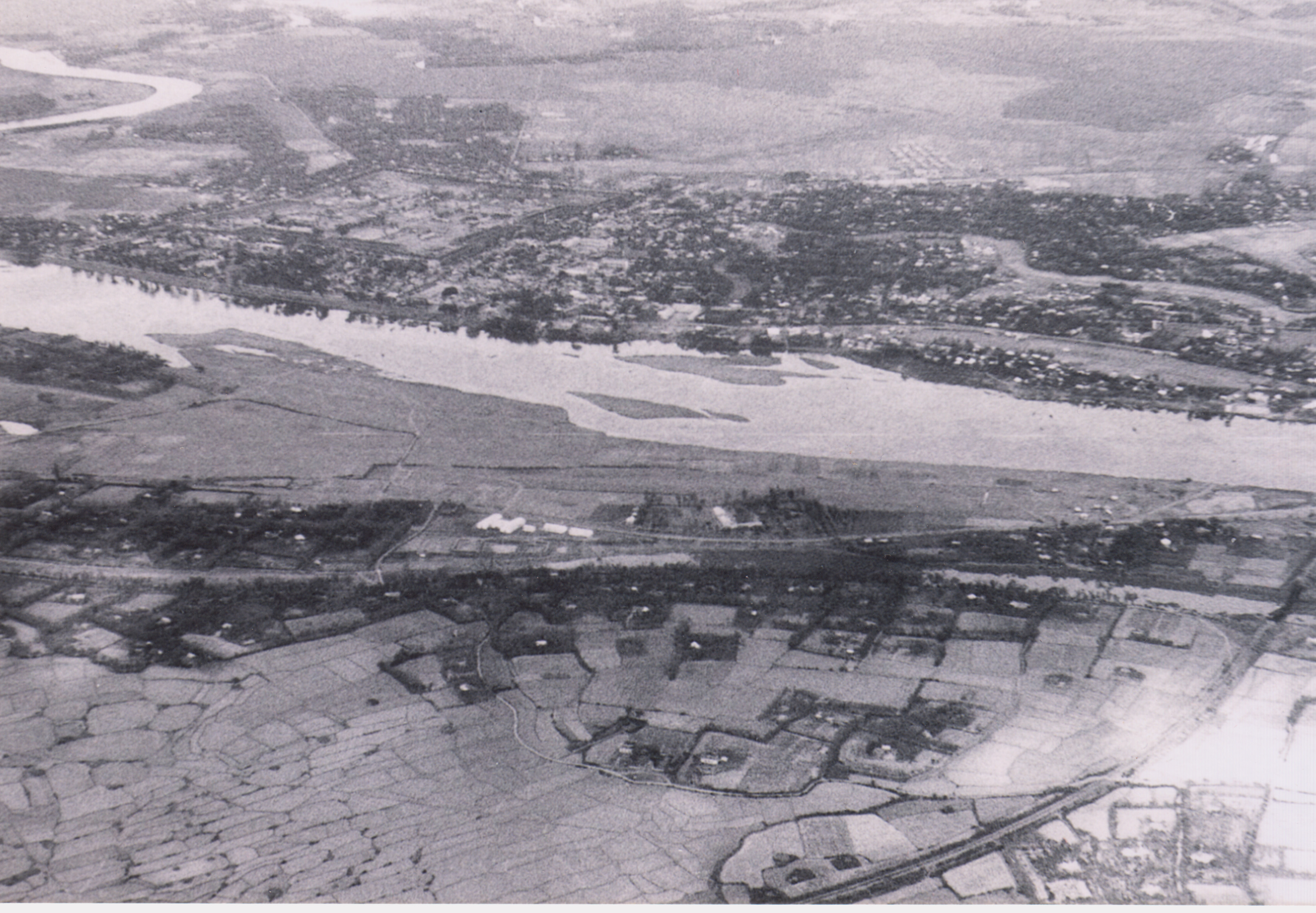
Quang Tri City looking northeast, fall 1967: the Quang Tri Citadel is at the upper left with Tri Buu Village beyond it; the Thach Han River is in the center

In 1968, Quảng Trị City was a small market town and the capital of Quảng Trị Province, the northernmost province of South Vietnam, bordering North Vietnam to the north, and Laos to the west. Like the old imperial capital at Huế, Quảng Trị City is located on Route 1. It is about 10 kilometers (6.2 mi) inland from the South China Sea along the eastern bank of the Thach Han River, 25 kilometers (16 mi) south of the Demilitarized Zone. Because Quảng Trị City was an important symbol of South Vietnamese government authority and was arguably the most vulnerable provincial capital in South Vietnam, it was a prime target of the North Vietnamese during the 1968 Tet Offensive. The PAVN had attacked and briefly overrun and occupied the city ten months earlier, on 6 April 1967, in a large scale coordinated attack by a reinforced PAVN regiment, freeing 200 Communist prisoners from a city prison. The permanent loss of the city to the Communists would be a political embarrassment and weaken the government's legitimacy, and would allow the establishment of a Communist administrative center in the South. The question was not whether the PAVN/VC would attack Quảng Trị City again, but when.

=== PAVN/VC forces and plan of attack ===
The PAVN 812th Regiment (reinforced), of the 324th Division, was assigned the task of capturing and holding Quảng Trị City. When the regiment moved into the DMZ, the National Security Agency (NSA) closely monitored their radio transmissions through their top secret Signals Intelligence (SIGINT) operations. This intelligence gathered through the interception and analysis of North Vietnamese and VC communications such as radio transmissions, telephone calls, electronic signals, and coded messages. The 812th quietly disappeared from detection when the commander enforced strict radio silence to hide from U.S. intelligence. Then the hundreds of PAVN troops stealthily departed from a valley north of Khe Sanh and headed eastward, toward Quang Tri City.

The 812th three regular battalions, K-4, K-5, K-6, and the reinforcing 808th Main Force Battalion (or K8 battalion from the PAVN 90th Regiment) and 814th Main Force Battalion, both largely manned by North Vietnamese regulars, numbered about 400 to 500 men each. Along with a platoon of the 10th Sapper Battalion, and signal, reconnaissance and heavy weapons support companies, the reinforced regiment totaled about 2,700 troops.

The PAVN plan called for the platoon from the 10th Sapper Battalion to infiltrate the city on the evening of 30/31 January to pave the way for a major assault by elements of the 812th Regiment. The K4 Battalion and the 814th Main Force Battalion would supply the primary assaulting forces. At 02:00 on the 31st the sappers would emerge from hiding to destroy key installations in the city. At the same time the K4 Battalion would attack from the east and the 814th Battalion from the northeast. A 122-mm. rocket battalion (probably from the 54th Artillery Regiment) and organic artillery would provide supporting fire for the attack. The K8 Battalion would position itself along Highway 1 just north of the city to block allied reinforcements coming from that direction. The K6 Battalion would assault the city from the southeast, block Highway 1 south of the city, and attack the headquarters of the ARVN 1st Infantry Regiment, 1st Division, at La Vang Base about a mile and a half south of the city. The 812th's K5 Battalion would remain in reserve in the village of Hải Lăng 8 kilometers (5.0 mi) southeast of the city. Commandos from the 10th Sapper Battalion would also attack Landing Zone Jane south of La Vang to keep the American forces there tied down. The 814th and K4 Battalions would then occupy the city, and the remainder of the 812th Regiment would deploy in blocking positions in the surrounding area to prevent allied reinforcements.

Given their failure to hold Quảng Trị City after overrunning and briefly occupying it in April 1967 despite committing a large force of about 2,500 men, the PAVN/VC became more aware of the difficulties of attacking and capturing the city. In the weeks before Tet, they had attempted to lure Allied forces from the coastal lowlands to the mountains by threatening several of the Marine combat bases along Highway 9 in the western part of the province. But while the U.S. Marines had shifted some forces to the besieged Khe Sanh Combat Base, MACV commanders had reinforced eastern Quảng Trị Province in late January with the 1st Brigade of the 1st Cavalry Division. The existence of major American units near Quảng Trị City came as a shock, but with little time to make adjustments, the Communists decided to move forward with their original plan.

=== Disposition of ARVN units ===
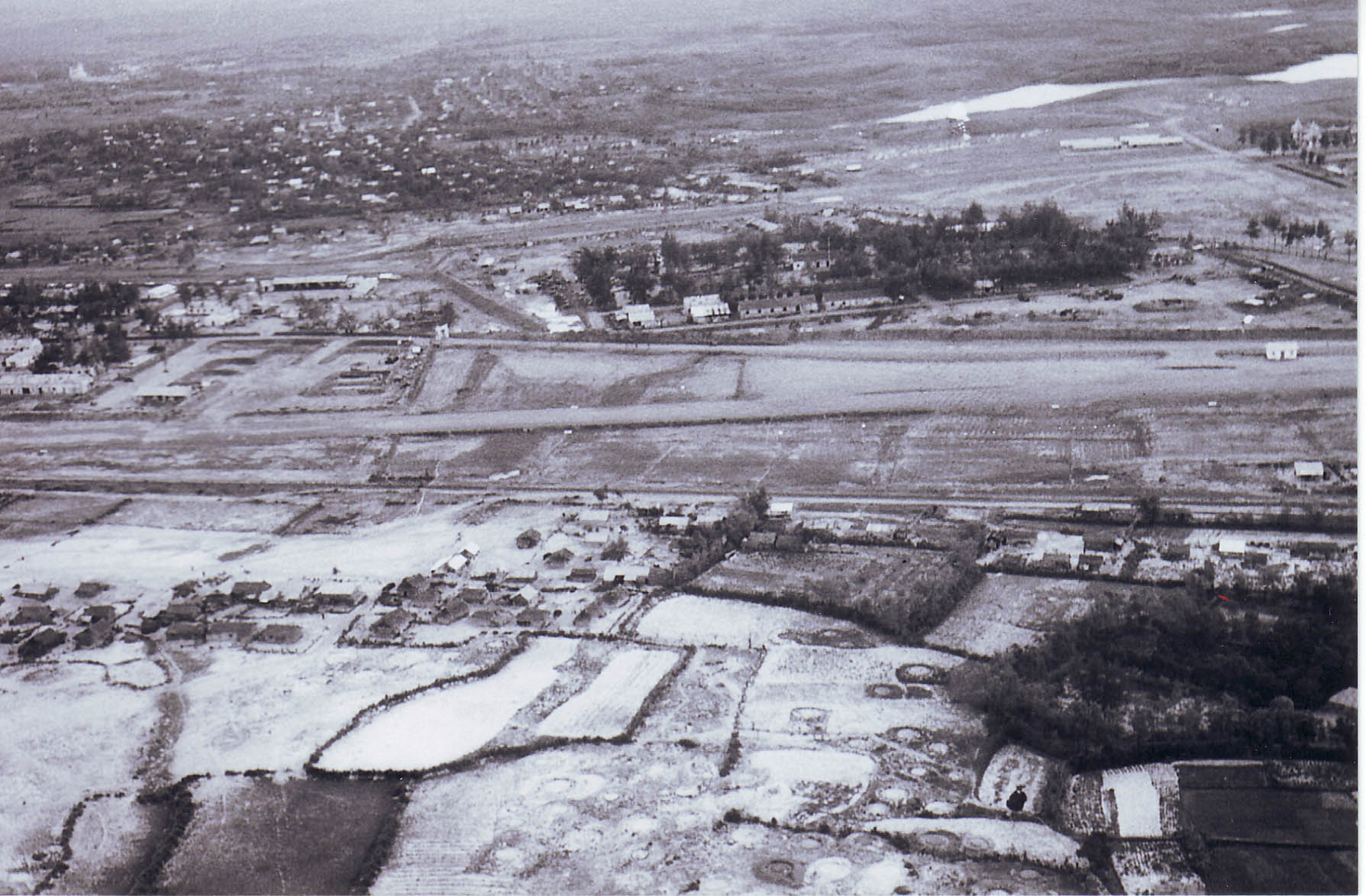
ARVN 1st Regiment airfield and compound at La Vang Thuong, fall 1967, looking south

The brunt of the attack would fall on the ARVN forces in and around the city. These were the 1st Vietnamese Regiment, the 9th Airborne Battalion, an Armored Personnel Carrier (APC) Troop attached to the 1st Regiment (2nd Troop of the ARVN 7th Cavalry), the Republic of Vietnam National Police headquarters in the city, a military body similar to the French Gendarmerie led by regular military officers, and Regional and Popular Force (militia) elements in the city. The 1st Regiment had two of its battalions in positions to the north of the city, and one to the northeast, protecting pacified villages in those areas. The Regiment's fourth battalion was in positions south of the city in and around the regiment's headquarters at La Vang. One Airborne company of the 9th Airborne battalion was bivouacked in Tri Buu village on the northern edge of the city with elements in the Citadel, and the remaining three Airborne companies and the battalion commander were positioned just south of the city in the area of a large cemetery where Highway 1 crosses Route 555.

=== Disposition of American units ===
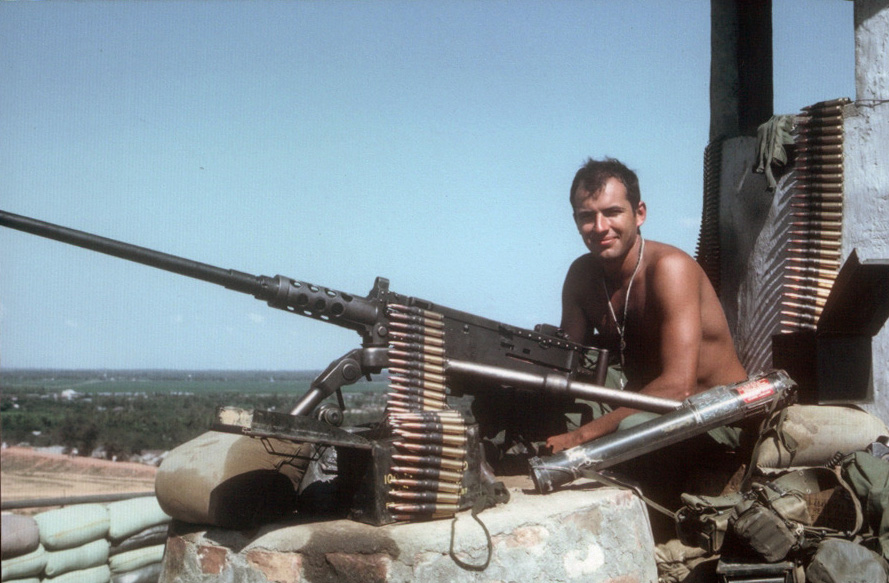
January 27, 1968. 1st Cav LRP atop LZ Betty's water tower.

The 1st Brigade, 1st Cavalry Division commanded by Colonel Donald V. Rattan had been moved from near Huế and Phu Bai six days earlier to Quảng Trị Province, with its headquarters at Landing Zone Betty (16.718°N 107.194°E) two kilometers south of Quảng Trị City, with the bulk of its force at LZ Sharon, another kilometer south, in order to launch attacks on the PAVN/VC Base Area 101 roughly 15 kilometers (9.3 mi) to the west-southwest. The brigade had an additional mission to block approaches into the city from the southwest but was primarily focused on its offensive mission. Accordingly, had quickly established two fire bases, one 15 kilometers (9.3 mi) west of the city and another in the middle of the base areas in the hills west of Quảng Trị City. The 2nd Brigade of the 101st Airborne Division was also moved into Quảng Trị Province in late January, reinforcing the two brigades of the 1st Cavalry in the area.

== Battle ==
=== Assault on Quảng Trị City ===
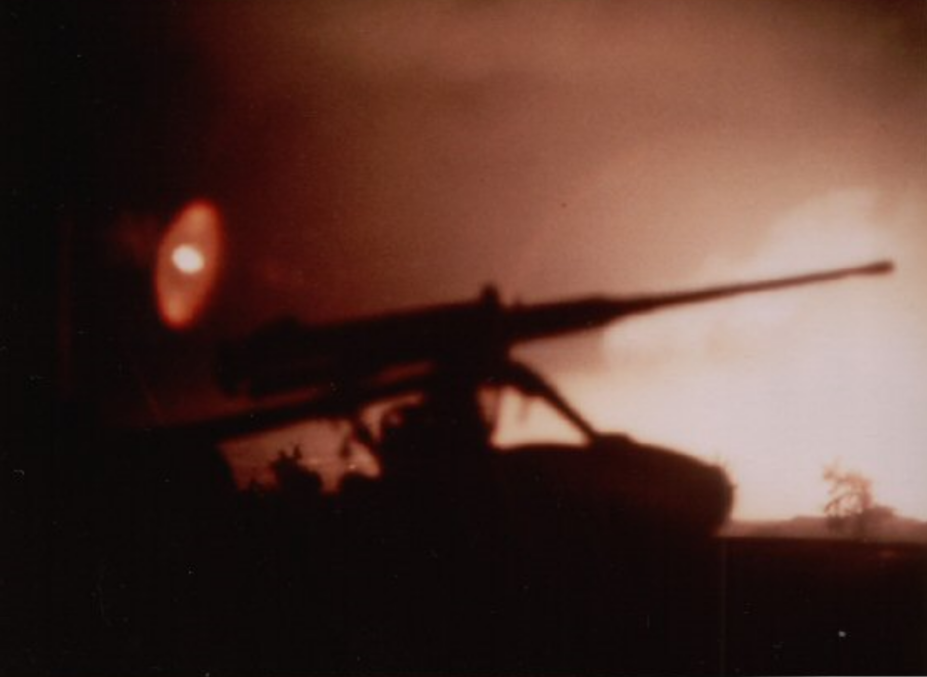
Start of Tet Offensive: Initial PAVN artillery barrage on Quang Tri City as seen from LZ Betty's water tower.

The coordinated PAVN/VC assault was scheduled to begin at 02:00 on 31 January. The 10th Sapper began its attacks on time, but the arrival and attacks of the PAVN infantry and artillery units were delayed by at least two hours by heavy rains and swollen streams and their lack of familiarity with the geography of Quảng Trị Province, and they did not start to move into position until about 04:00. As a result, Regional and Popular Forces, local National Police elements, and elements of the 1st ARVN Regiment located within the city were able to respond to the sappers without having to contend with the main attack at the same time.

As the 814th Battalion was moving into position to attack Quảng Trị from the northeast, it unexpectedly encountered the 9th ARVN Airborne company in Tri Buu village, which engaged it in a sharp firefight lasting about 20 minutes. The Airborne company was nearly annihilated and an American adviser killed, but its stubborn resistance stalled the 814th battalion's assault on the Citadel and the city.

By 04:20, with an intense, sustained rocket and artillery barrage on the city, Citadel, and MACV compound, the heavy communist pressure and overwhelming numbers forced the few surviving South Vietnamese paratroopers to exfiltrate south along the river to join their comrades in the cemetery, and the 814th began a series of assaults on the Citadel, all of which failed.

The initial assault by the K4 Battalion from the east was successful. Following the artillery barrage, as the 814th Battalion began its delayed assault on the Citadel, the battalion skirted the lower edge of Tri Buu Village and around the MACV compound and swarmed into the city, attempting to seize strong points and assaulting the Citadel from the south. South Vietnamese irregulars and National Policemen slowed the enemy’s advance, however, and its assaults on the southern wall of the Citadel were beaten back. Adding to its difficulties was the failure of an expected "general uprising" it had been told to expect. To the south, the PAVN K6 battalion slammed unexpectedly into the three Airborne companies resulting in an intense, extended firefight that lasted well into the 31st.

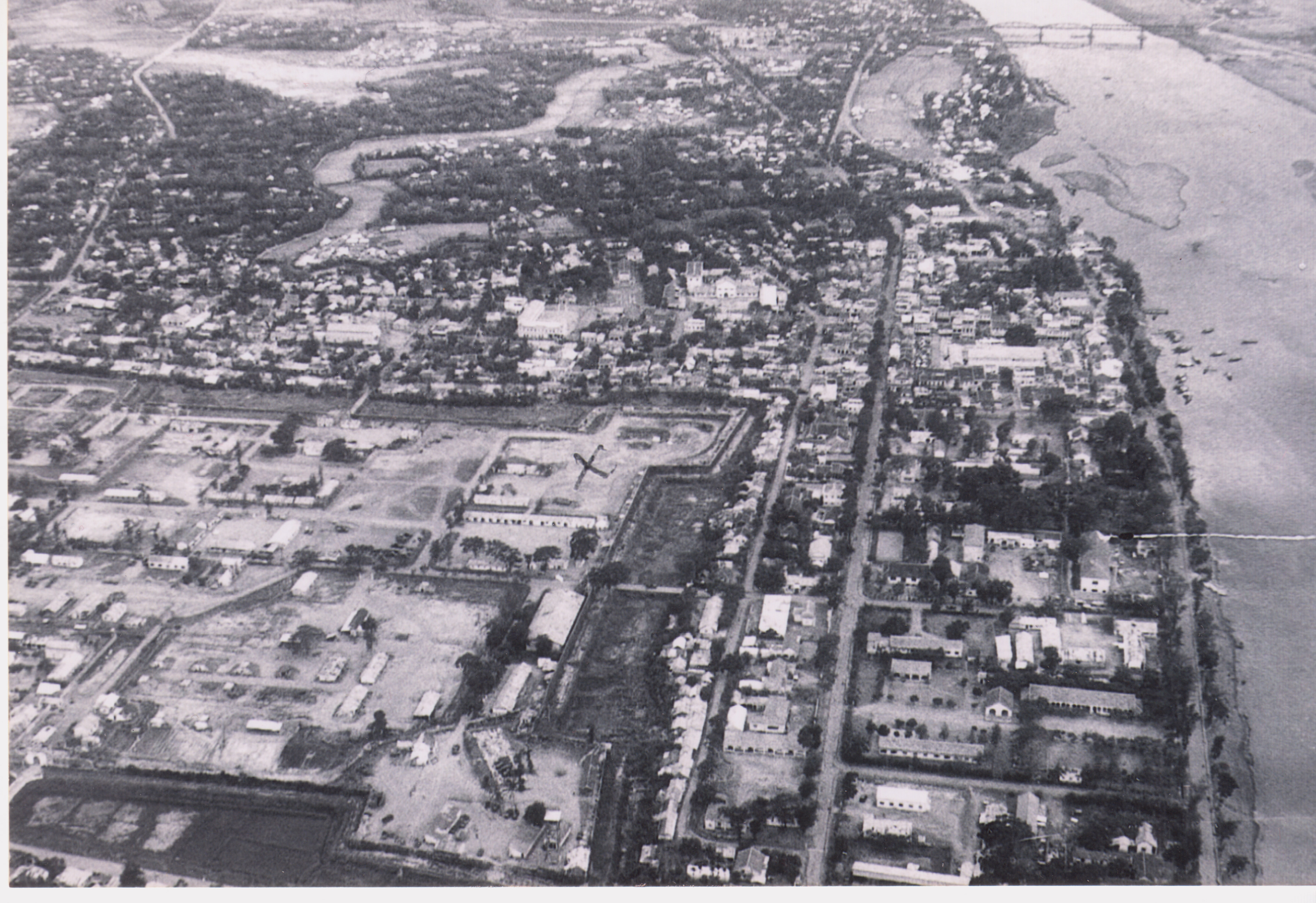
Quang Tri City looking south, fall 1967: The Citadel is in the lower center and right; the cemetery at the junction of Route 555 and Highway 1 is at the far upper center and left (Highway 1 runs east and west at that point); the bridge in the distance carried Highway 1 across the Thach Han River

Shortly after dawn the 1st Infantry Regiment commander ordered his battalions to recapture the city. His three battalions north of Quảng Trị City began marching toward the capital. Along the way, they collided with the 808th Battalion blocking Highway 1 near the Trieu Phong District headquarters which temporarily stopped their assault. At about the same time, ARVN troops at La Vang began moving north toward the fighting between the Airborne companies and the K6 Battalion in the cemetery south of the city, and were ambushed by the K6th, slowing their advance to a crawl, and they were unable to relieve the paratroopers. Only the K5 Battalion, holding its position in Hai Lang District well south of the city to block reinforcements from Huế, remained unengaged in the fighting.

=== Engagement of American forces and counterattack ===
Shortly after noon on 31 January, Robert Brewer, the senior adviser to the military officer who was Province Chief of Quảng Trị, held a conference with Colonel Rattan, and the senior U.S. adviser to the Vietnamese 1st Regiment. The city's status was in the balance. The enemy had infiltrated at least a battalion into the city and its defending forces were in need of immediate assistance. At the time, it appeared that the communists reinforcing from the east and had established fire support positions on the eastern edge of the city.

At the start of the attack, the ARVN 1st Regiment headquarters at La Vang and Col. Rattan's headquarters at Landing Zone Betty south of La Vang came under sporadic rocket and mortar attacks and ground assaults by elements of the 10th Sapper Battalion, while extremely heavy fog hampered visibility. The fog also prevented shifting the 1st Battalion, 8th US Cavalry Regiment's base camp in the mountains west of Quảng Trị. The 1st Battalion, 502nd Infantry Regiment, which was under the control of the 1st Cavalry Division, continued its base defense mission and patrols west of Quảng Trị.

This left only the 1st Battalion of the 12th US Cavalry Regiment and the 1st Battalion of the 5th Cavalry Regiment to support the ARVN units engaged with the PAVN/VC. Both battalions had opened new fire bases to the west of Quảng Trị, along the river valley leading to Khe Sanh. At approximately 13:45 on 31 January, Col. Rattan directed the battalions to close out the new fire bases and launch assaults as soon as possible to prevent the PAVN/VC from bringing additional forces into the city and also blocking their withdrawal. By 16:00, the cavalry battalions had air assaulted into five locations northeast, east, and southeast of Quảng Trị City where intelligence sources had shown PAVN/VC units located. The American helicopters received heavy fire as they landed troops east of the city in the middle of the heavy weapons support of the K-4 Battalion, and fighting there continued until 19:00 as the PAVN/VC fought with machine guns, mortars, and recoilless rifles. Engaged by ARVN forces in and near the city, and by American forces on the east, the K4 Battalion was soon overcome. Two companies of the 1/5th Cavalry air-assaulted southeast of Quảng Trị engaging the K6 Battalion from the rear in a heavy firefight, while ARVN troops blocked and attacked it from the direction of the city. American helicopter gunships and artillery hit the K6 Battalion hard causing significant further casualties. By nightfall on the 31st, the battered 812th Regiment decided to withdraw, though clashes continued throughout the night.

Quảng Trị City was clear of PAVN/VC troops by mid-afternoon on 1 February, and ARVN units with U.S. air support had cleared Tri Buu Village of enemy troops. The remnants of the 812th and K6 battalions, having been hit hard by ARVN defenders in and around the City, and by American air power, artillery, helicopters and air assaults by 1st Cavalry troopers on the outskirts of the city, broke up into small groups. Sometimes mingling with crowds of fleeing refugees, they began to exfiltrate the area, trying to avoid further contact with Allied forces.

The fleeing PAVN and Main Force soldiers were pursued vigorously by ARVN and American forces, with contact continuing off and on over the next ten days. Heavy fighting continued with large well-armed PAVN/VC forces south of Quảng Trị City, and there were lighter contacts in other areas.

The American military considered the attack on Quảng Trị "without a doubt one of the major objectives of the Tet offensive". They attributed the decisive defeat to the hard-nosed South Vietnamese defense, effective intelligence on PAVN/VC movements provided by Robert Brewer, and the air mobile tactics of the 1st Cavalry Division. Between 31 January and 6 February, the allies killed an estimated 914 PAVN/VC and captured another 86 in and around Quang Tri City.

== Aftermath ==
The rapid defeat of the regimental-size enemy force that assaulted Quảng Trị City proved to be one of the most decisive victories the Allies secured during the Tet Offensive. Aside from mopping up operations in the countryside, it was effectively over less than twenty-four hours after it had begun. Most elements of the 812th PAVN Regiment were so badly mauled that they avoided all contact for the next several weeks, when they otherwise might have played a role in the battle for Battle of Huế 50 kilometers (31 mi) to the south. Losing the province capital would have been a severe blow to South Vietnamese morale, and PAVN units could have caused extensive damage to nearby ARVN and American bases had they captured long range ARVN artillery pieces in the Citadel. They would also have cut off resupply traffic on Highway 1 to allied forces along the DMZ and the Marines at Khe Sanh. The PAVN/VC's swift defeat preserved an important symbol of South Vietnamese national pride and allowed the allies to devote more resources to other battles in northern I Corps, particularly to the struggle for Huế.

== See also ==
- First Battle of Quảng Trị
- Second Battle of Quảng Trị
