= Quảng Trị (ward) =

- Ward
- Quảng Trị Ward; Phường Quảng Trị
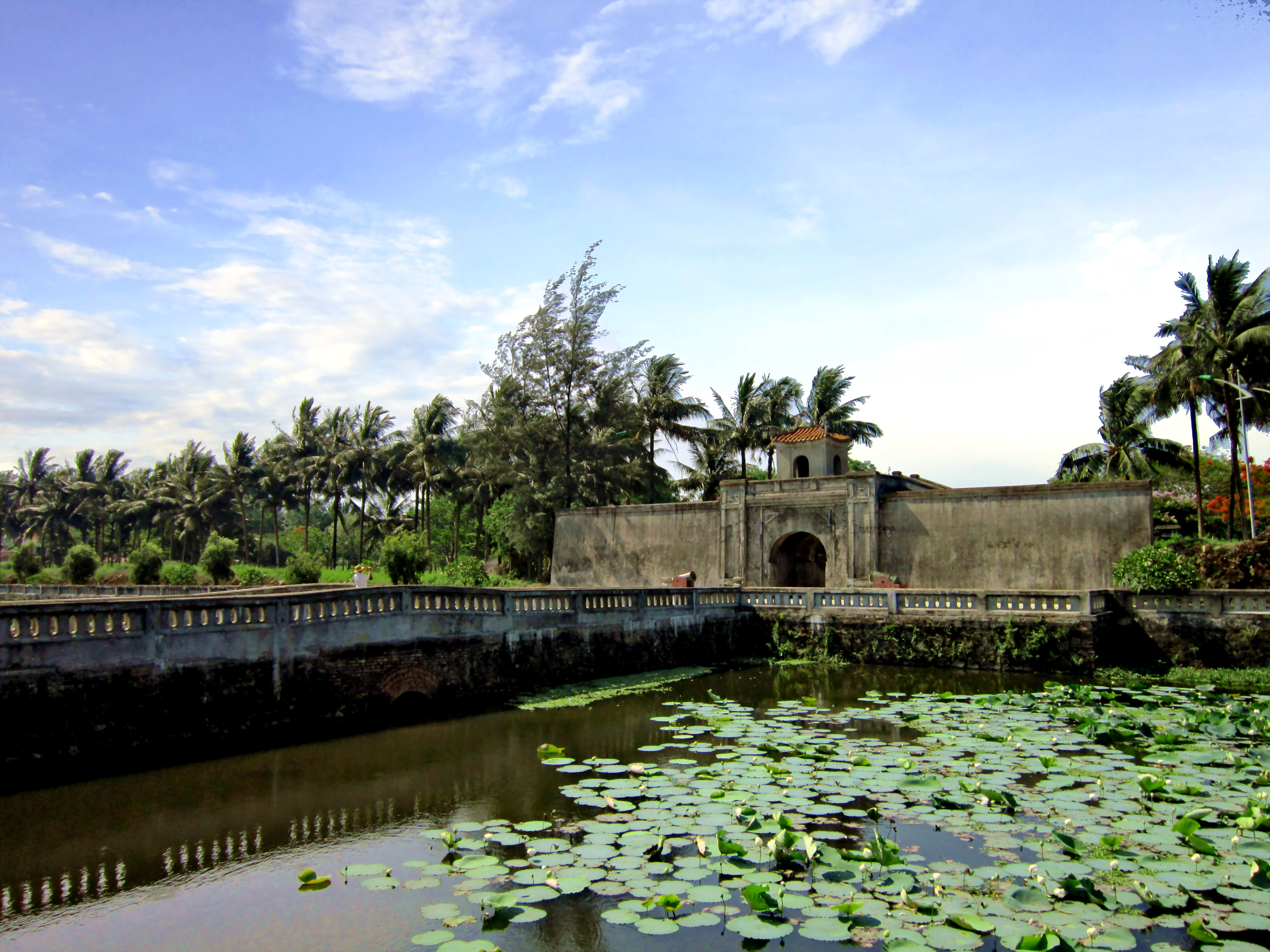
- The Quảng Trị Citadel built in 1824

- Seal

- Location within Vietnam
- Coordinates: 16°44′49″N 107°11′40″E
- Country: Vietnam
- Region: North Central Coast
- Province: Quảng Trị
- Established: 16 September 1989

Area
  - Ward: 74 km^{2} (29 sq mi)
  - Urban: 8.27 km^{2} (3.19 sq mi)

Population (2019)
  - Ward: 23,356
  - Density: 315/km^{2} (820/sq mi)
  - Urban: 19,390
  - Urban density: 2,340/km^{2} (6,070/sq mi)
- Time zone: UTC+7 (ICT)

Quảng Trị is a ward in Quảng Trị Province in the North Central Coast region of Vietnam.

Prior to July 1, 2025, Quảng Trị Ward was formerly Quảng Trị Town, which had five subordinate administrative units, including Wards 1, 2, 3, An Đôn Ward, and Hải Lệ Commune. During the administrative reorganization and restructuring in 2025, all five subordinate administrative units of Quảng Trị Town were dissolved, and Quảng Trị Town was converted into Quảng Trị Ward.

== History ==
The Sino-Vietnamese name Quảng Trị (廣治) was given by Vietnamese Confucian administrators.

A major feature of the town is the Quảng Trị Citadel, built in 1824, as a military bastion during the 4th year of the reign of Minh Mạng. It is an example of Vauban architecture and it later became the administrative head office of the Nguyễn dynasty in Quảng Trị Province (1809–1945).

Quảng Trị was an area of early Catholic presence and by 1913, the nearest railway station to the starting point of the La Vang pilgrimage.

During the Vietnam War, when the province was the South's border with North Vietnam, it suffered a major attack in the January 1968 Tet Offensive and it was the only South Vietnamese provincial capital to be captured by the North Vietnamese forces in the 1972 Easter Offensive before being recaptured in September 1972. During the Vietnam War the city became what some regard as the most bombed city in the world.

== Notable residents ==
- Hieu Van Le, Governor of the Australian state of South Australia, was born here in 1954.
- Vân Khánh (born 1978), folk singer
