= Battle of Huế =

1968 battle during the Vietnam War

- Part of the Tết Offensive of the Vietnam War
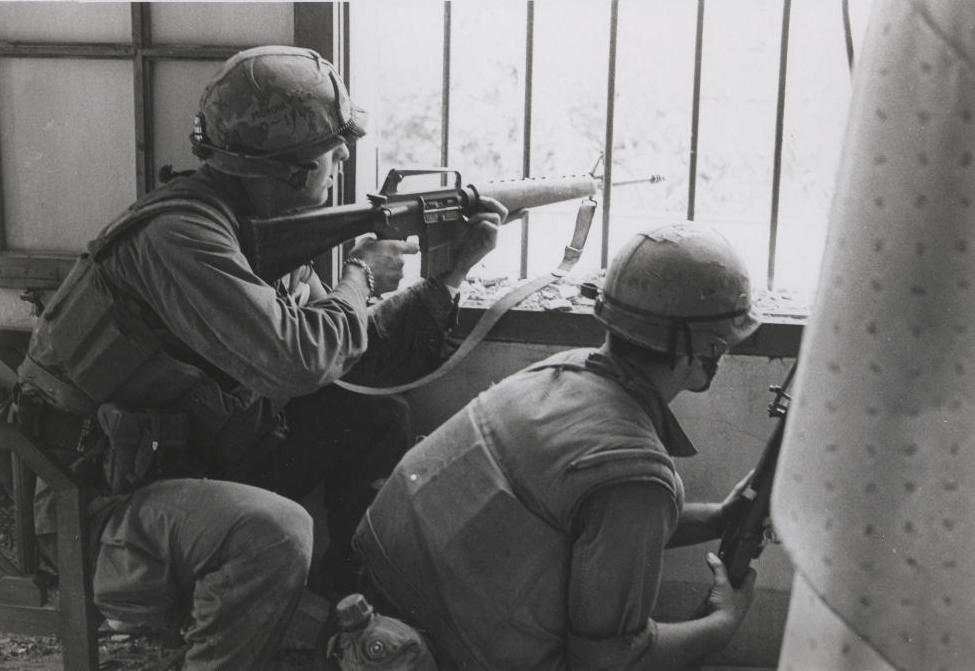
- U.S. Marines from A Company, 1st Battalion, 1st Marines, engaged in house-to-house combat in Huế in February 1968
| Date | 31 January – 2 March 1968 (1 month and 2 days) |
| Location | Huế, South Vietnam 16°28′03″N 107°34′48″E |
| Result | American–South Vietnamese victory; Sustained damage to the Hue city and ancient imperial city of Hue |

Belligerents
| South Vietnam; United States | North Vietnam; Viet Cong |

Commanders and leaders
| (South Vietnam) Ngô Quang Trưởng (United States) Stanley S. Hughes (United States) Foster LaHue (United States) John J. Tolson | (Vietnam) Trần Văn Quang; Đặng Kinh; Nam Long; Lê Tư Minh |

Strength
| 11 ARVN battalions 4 U.S. Army battalions 4 U.S. Marine Corps battalions Total: ~15,000 men U.S. Air Force support | 4 PAVN and 8 VC battalions (10,000+ troops); Hundreds of local militia |

Casualties and losses
| ARVN: 458 killed 2,700 wounded U.S.: 250 killed 1,554 wounded Total: 708 killed 4,254+ wounded | PAVN figures: 1,042—2,400 killed 3,000 wounded (from 30/1 until 28/3) (Note: The low end was from a PAVN document captured by the ARVN, which stated 1,042 troops had been killed in the city proper and that several times that number had been wounded (from 30/1 until 2/3)); MACV figures: 5,113 killed 98 captured |
- 5,800—8,000 civilians killed (Note: Including 300—6,000 civilians and POWs executed by the communists or missing, and 200—2,000 civilians killed in ARVN reprisals)
- Location within Vietnam

The Battle of Huế (31 January 1968 – 2 March 1968) was a major battle in the Tết Offensive launched by North Vietnam and the Việt Cộng during the Vietnam War. Initially losing control of most of Huế and its surroundings, the combined forces of South Vietnam and the United States gradually recaptured the city after a little over one month of intense fighting. The battle was one of the longest and bloodiest of the war, causing it to negatively affect the American public perception of the war. The battle is widely considered to be one of the toughest and most intense urban battles fought by the United States armed forces.

By the beginning of the North Vietnamese Tet Offensive on 30 January 1968, which coincided with the Vietnamese Tết Lunar New Year, large conventional American forces had been committed to combat operations on Vietnamese soil for almost three years. Highway 1, passing through the city of Huế, was an important supply line for Army of the Republic of Vietnam (ARVN) and United States forces from the coastal city of Da Nang to the Vietnamese Demilitarized Zone (DMZ), the de facto border between North and South Vietnam only 50 kilometers (31 mi) to the north of Huế. The highway also provided access to the Perfume River (Vietnamese: Sông Hương or Hương Giang) at the point where the river ran through Huế, dividing the city into northern and southern parts. Huế was also a base for United States Navy supply boats. Due to the Tết holidays, large numbers of ARVN forces were on leave and the city was poorly defended.

While the ARVN 1st Division had cancelled all Tết leave and was attempting to recall its troops, the South Vietnamese and American forces in the city were unprepared when the Việt Cộng (VC) and the People's Army of Vietnam (PAVN) launched the Tet Offensive, attacking hundreds of military targets and population centers across the country, including Huế. The PAVN-VC forces rapidly occupied most of the city. Over the next month, they were gradually driven out during intense house-to-house fighting led by the Marines and ARVN. In the end, the Allies declared a military victory. The city of Huế was virtually destroyed, and between 5,800 and 8,000 civilians were killed, including more than 2,000 of them executed by the PAVN and VC. The PAVN-VC lost somewhere between 1,042 and 5,133 killed. Allied forces lost 708 dead and 4,254 wounded.

== Planning ==
Huế, the ancient imperial capital city of Vietnam, had a population of nearly 140,000, making it the third largest city in the Republic of Vietnam, commonly known as South Vietnam. The Citadel, or Imperial City, is the walled-in portion of Huế sitting on the north bank of the Perfume River. The walls of the Citadel form a square with sides of 2,500 meters. The outer stone wall is one meter thick, five meters high and is separated from the inner wall by dirt fill. The distance between the walls varies from 75 meters to 17.5 meters. Half the population lived within the Citadel in 1 or 2 story houses surrounded by stone walls.

On the south side of the river was the new city of Huế, which contained most of the government buildings, schools, and the university, set on wide boulevards. Connecting the Citadel and new city were the Trường Tiền Bridge (16.468°N 107.589°E), which carried Highway 1, and further west the Bach Ho rail bridge. Huế had great symbolism, having been the capital of Vietnam under the Nguyễn dynasty from 1802 to 1945. Hồ Chí Minh, Phạm Văn Đồng, Võ Nguyên Giáp and Ngô Đình Diệm had all attended the lycée in the city. Huế had been at the center of the Buddhist crisis of 1963 and the Buddhist Uprising of 1966 and other than the city's Catholics, its population of Buddhists and intellectuals were lukewarm supporters of the Nguyễn Văn Thiệu-Nguyễn Cao Kỳ government.

The North Vietnamese plan for the Tet Offensive was known as the "General Offensive-General Uprising". The General Offensive was to comprise conventional and guerilla military action aimed primarily at the "puppet" South Vietnamese military and government, attempting to destroy their legitimacy among the South Vietnamese population. The General Uprising was the expectation that the oppressed South Vietnamese population would then spontaneously rise up and overthrow the Thiệu-Kỳ government and that this would force the United States to withdraw in the face of the will of the people. The strategic objective at Huế was to capture (or "liberate") and hold the city, leading to the establishment of a revolutionary government. While some senior PAVN leaders were skeptical about the plan, believing that the population was unlikely to rise up and that they could only hold out against the ARVN and U.S. forces for a few days before they would be forced to withdraw, they followed their orders. Younger soldiers were convinced by the party propaganda that they were on the verge of a great victory that would end the war. When the PAVN and VC forces left their base camps west of Huế to commence the attack they had no intention of returning.

The ARVN and Military Assistance Command Vietnam (MACV) were largely unprepared for the Tet Offensive. MACV's focus was on the Battle of Khe Sanh, where a PAVN assault was believed to be imminent. In preparation for this, MACV was in the middle of Operation Checkers: moving the 1st Marine Division to Quảng Trị Province in order to support Khe Sanh and defeat any other PAVN attack across the DMZ.

== Opposing forces ==
=== South Vietnam ===
The headquarters of ARVN Brigadier General Ngô Quang Trưởng's 1st Division was located in the Mang Ca Garrison, a minifortress in the northeast corner of the Citadel. Apart from the headquarters staff and a handful of support units, the only combat units in the Citadel were the division's 36-man Reconnaissance Platoon and its reaction force, the elite Hac Bao (Black Panther) Reconnaissance Company. 3 kilometers (1.9 mi) southwest of the Citadel, on the north bank of the Perfume River, was the Van Thanh divisional training center and a two-gun detachment of 105mm howitzers. 2 kilometers (1.2 mi) south of the Perfume River and just west of Highway 1 was the Tam Thai military camp, headquarters of the ARVN 7th Armored Squadron Regiment equipped with M41 Walker Bulldog tanks. About 2 kilometers (1.2 mi) to its southwest was the 101st Engineering Company compound (16.437°N 107.582°E). The 1st Division's units were spread throughout I Corps, two battalions of the 3rd Infantry Regiment were west of Huế, one on a routine sweep mission and the other undergoing training at the Van Thanh center, while the remaining two battalions of the regiment were searching for the PAVN-VC near the coast southeast of Huế. The 1st Regiment was stationed near Quảng Trị 50 kilometers (31 mi) to the northwest and the 2nd Regiment was another twelve kilometers farther up Highway 1 near Đông Hà. Under I Corps command, but available to Trưởng upon his request were two battalions of the ARVN 1st Airborne Task Force and a troop of armored personnel carriers from the 7th Armored Cavalry Squadron at PK-17, the ARVN base located near a road marker on Highway 1, 17 kilometers (11 mi) north of Huế.

=== United States ===
The Marines' Phu Bai Combat Base, 11 kilometers (6.8 mi) south of Huế on Highway 1, included Task Force X-Ray, a brigade-size component of the 1st Marine Division built around the 1st and 5th Marine Regiments. The U.S. Army 1st and 3rd Brigades, 1st Cavalry Division and the 2nd Brigade, 101st Airborne Division, operated out of a series of firebases and landing zones between Phu Bai and Quảng Trị. Both the Marine and the airmobile units operating near Huế were in a state of flux as the Tết holiday began. The 1st Cavalry Division was in the midst of relocating from Bình Định Province in II Corps to Quảng Trị and Thừa Thiên Provinces in I Corps. By the last week of January, most of its combat units had arrived, but many of the division's logistical components were still in transit. When the headquarters of 3rd Brigade, 1st Cavalry Division arrived at Camp Evans, 27 kilometers (17 mi) northwest of Huế on 26 January, it found that the site held no stocks of ammunition or fuel. Supplies would remain tight for the next week as the Division's helicopters tried to build up a reserve of materiel. Within Huế, approximately 100 U.S. Army advisers and administrative personnel, as well as a few Marine guards, were headquartered in the new city in the lightly defended MACV Compound (16.466°N 107.592°E) a block and a half south of the Perfume River on the east side of Highway 1. A rotating group of staff personnel from the compound was stationed at Trưởng's headquarters day and night. Other advisers were in the countryside accompanying ARVN units. A small group of Army technicians manned a communications facility a few hundred meters to the east of the MACV Compound. Several dozen Army technical specialists and military intelligence personnel were billeted in the Huong Giang Hotel several blocks to the west. Finally, a small detachment of U.S. Navy personnel was stationed at a boat ramp just north of the MACV Compound.

=== North Vietnam and Viet Cong ===
At least two PAVN regiments, two sapper battalions, and an assortment of VC local forces were based in Thừa Thiên Province. The headquarters of the PAVN 6th Regiment and two of its battalions were thought to be in Base Area 114, 30 kilometers (19 mi) southwest of Huế, while the third battalion from the regiment was approximately 35 kilometers (22 mi) northwest of the city, operating on the coastal flats. The Huế City Sapper Unit and the 12th Sapper Battalion were also located in Base Area 114. Several local force companies operated in the districts surrounding Huế. The 804th Battalion of the newly created 4th Regiment was reported to be near Phú Lộc District, 30 kilometers (19 mi) southeast of the city. A second unit from the regiment, the 810th Battalion, and several local force companies roamed the coastal plain north and east of Huế. Unknown to Allied intelligence, the PAVN had recently shifted several more regiments and support units from Quảng Trị Province to the vicinity of Huế. Among the new arrivals was the 7th Battalion of the 29th Regiment, 325C Division, a unit that until recently had been laying siege to Khe Sanh. Also new to Thừa Thiên Province was the 5th Regiment, a three-battalion unit that normally operated from Base Area 101 near Quảng Trị. The Communists created a special logistical and administrative zone known as the Huế City Front to manage the upcoming battle. The new combat headquarters, staffed by high-ranking officials from the Trị-Thiên-Huế Front, local party members, and military officers from the units involved in the attack, had authority over the city and the three districts that surrounded it.

On 28 January, the PAVN/VC units tasked with attacking the new city began moving into position 48 hours earlier than the northern wing tasked with attacking the Citadel, because it had a longer distance to march and more difficult terrain to cross. The 804th Battalion, 4th Regiment, began marching from Phú Lộc to a mountain camp 20 kilometers (12 mi) south of Huế where the majority of the southern wing was gathered. Also on 28 January, the 810th Battalion, 4th Regiment and the 2nd Sapper Battalion began marching toward the city from locations along the coast east of Huế. On the afternoon of 29 January, the main body of the southern wing, the 804th Battalion, the 1st Sapper Battalion, the 815th and 818th Battalions of the 5th Regiment, the southern wing command group, and various supporting units descended from their mountain staging area and headed for the Tả Trạch River, which stood between the attacking force and Huế. The units intended to use a ferry station 10 kilometers (6.2 mi) south of the city to cross the river. The lead elements of the southern wing, the 1st Sapper Battalion and part of the 804th Battalion, arrived two hours ahead of schedule, which meant that they reached the crossing well before the sun had set. An allied aircraft spotted the units and reported their position. Artillery shells began raining down near the ferry landing and fighter-bombers soon joined the attack, which killed at least 12 PAVN-VC and scattered the rest. The Allied bombardment lasted intermittently from 17:30 until 03:30 the next day, forcing the entire southern wing to postpone the ferry crossing. The Allies did not send ground forces to investigate the incident, and no evidence exists that it generated much concern in any of the allied headquarters. The PAVN/VC crossed the river without incident on the evening of 30 January, but the delay meant that only the 1st and 2nd Sapper Battalions and an 82 mm mortar company would be in their forward positions when the offensive began.

== Battle ==
=== Prelude ===
Map of the initial attack

Premature Tet Offensive attacks at Nha Trang and Qui Nhơn on the morning of 30 January led to the cancellation of the Tết ceasefire, but many ARVN soldiers were already away on leave, meaning that defenses in and around Huế were undermanned. On learning of the cancellation of the ceasefire, Trưởng ordered his headquarters staff to remain at the Mang Ca compound that night, he sent three platoons from the Hac Bao Reconnaissance Company to guard the provincial headquarters, the power station and the prison in the new city. He split up two more platoons to reinforce security at the various gates leading into the Citadel. His remaining Hac Bao platoon, made up of the most experienced soldiers, took up position at the centrally located Tây Lộc Airfield to act as a rapid-reaction force. News of the cancelled cease-fire never reached the MACV Compound.

On the afternoon of 30 January Trưởng dispatched a Hac Bao platoon and an Australian Army adviser to scout the north bank of the Perfume River which provided the simplest route from Base Area 114 into the city. After marching southwest approximately 4 kilometers (2.5 mi), the team concealed itself in some bushes near the river and waited. That evening, the PAVN-VC northern attack wing began moving towards Huế from base camps in the western hills. A VC company armed with 82 mm mortars and 57 mm recoilless rifles veered north and took up a position near PK–17 outpost to shell the ARVN airborne and armored units stationed there once the offensive began. 2 kilometers (1.2 mi) to the northwest, an engineer unit moved within sight of its target, the An Lo Bridge that spanned the Bo River, as it did, the 806th Battalion, one company from the 800th Battalion and a sapper platoon of forty men, all from the 6th Regiment, quietly occupied a forward staging area in a graveyard 2 kilometers (1.2 mi) northwest of the Citadel. Around that time, the 802nd Battalion from the 6th Regiment, the remainder of the 800th Battalion, the 12th Sapper Battalion, and several heavy weapons companies marched down from the mountains to a spot on the Perfume River several kilometers west of Huế before turning toward the Citadel. At 22:00, South Vietnamese Regional Force (RF) troops stationed in a village a few hundred meters north of the An Hoa Bridge observed what appeared to be enemy figures moving past them in the dark. RF soldiers opened fire and radioed a warning to Trưởng's headquarters. ARVN troops in the Citadel fired flares over the village to help the RF troops there assess the situation. The enemy force, the forty sappers and an infantry company from the 800th Battalion that had been waiting in the graveyard northwest of An Hoa, did not return fire but crept away before they could be illuminated by the descending flares. The sappers’ mission was to scale the Citadel's wall near the Mang Ca compound, open and hold the Hau and An Hoa Gates and assist the infantry company with its attack on Trưởng's headquarters. The PAVN-VC could not afford to engage in a firefight at this point, and they succeeded in sneaking away without raising further alarms. After a few minutes, the RF soldiers stopped shooting, and some began to wonder whether they had seen enemy troops or had been firing at shadows. Shortly before midnight, the reconnaissance team hiding in the bushes on the north bank of the Perfume River saw a long column of PAVN soldiers emerge from the darkness. The allied platoon stayed out of sight as the 800th, 802nd and 12th Sapper Battalions marched past its position, heading east along the river toward the city. The patrol commander reported by radio what he had seen, Trưởng immediately dispatched a light observation airplane from the Tây Lộc Airfield to look for the enemy force. Flying through overcast skies, the aircraft returned two hours later, its pilot having seen nothing out of the ordinary.

On the night of 30 January it started to rain; from 2 February onwards this rain, low cloud and foggy weather (known locally as the crachin) would last through much of the battle and severely hamper Allied air and artillery support.

=== Attack ===
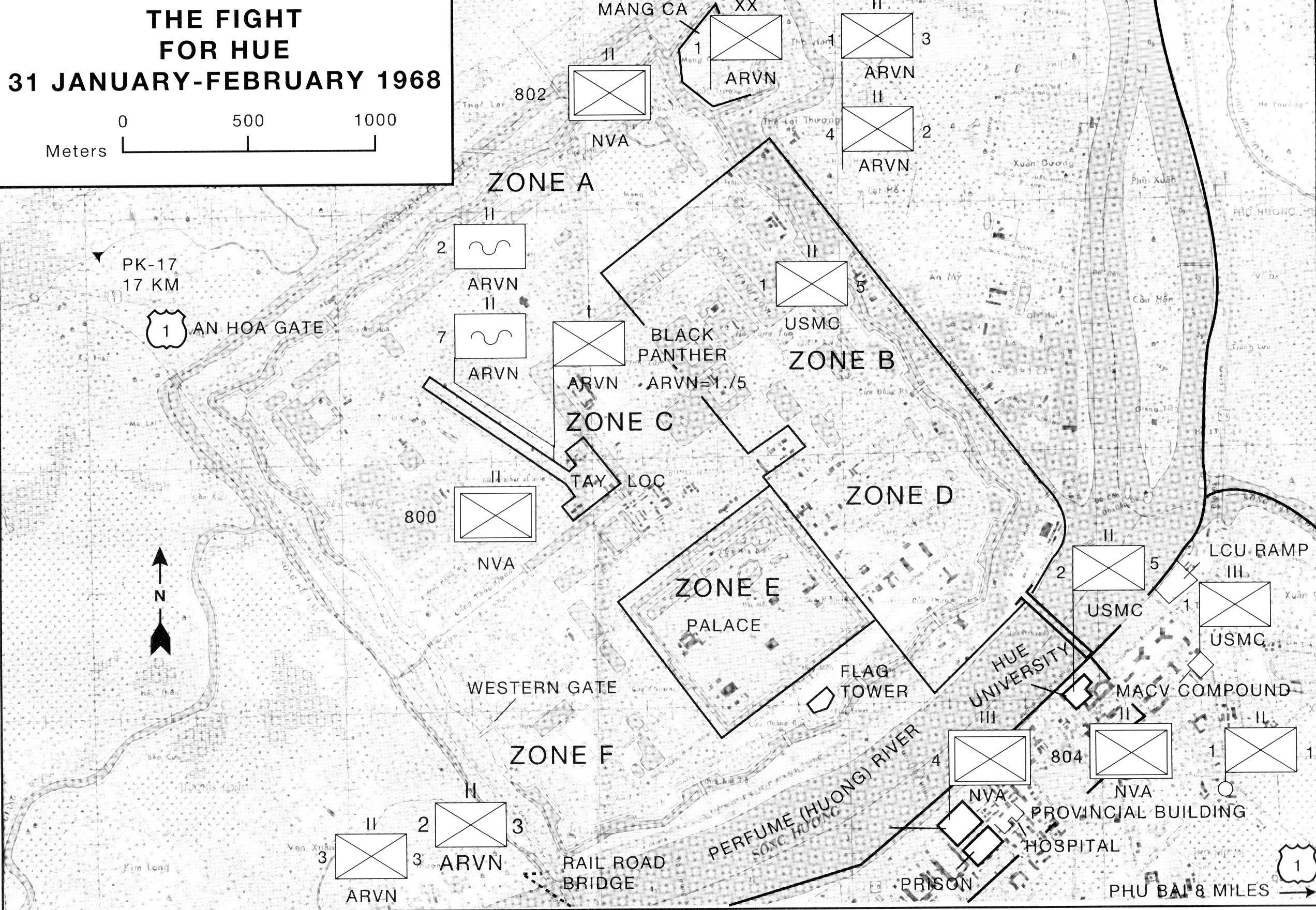
Hue: the initial dispositions

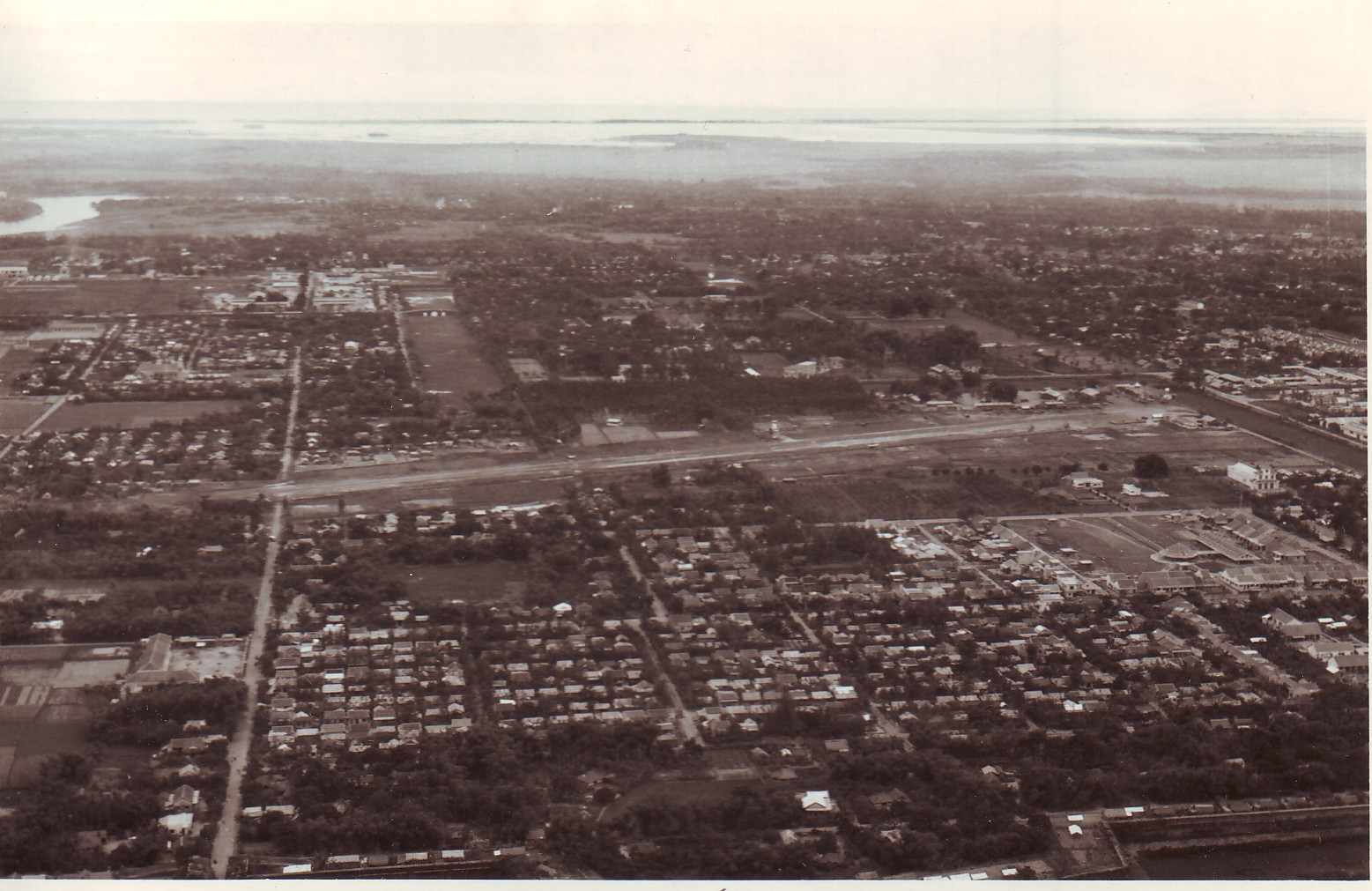
Tây Lộc airfield

In the early morning hours of 31 January 1968, a division-sized force of PAVN-VC soldiers launched a coordinated attack on the city of Huế. At 02:33, a signal flare lit up the night sky, and two battalions from the PAVN 6th Regiment attacked the western wall of the Citadel. Their objective was to capture the Mang Ca Garrison. The battle was initiated during the Vietnamese new year Tết holiday. The Viet Cong began a comprehensive campaign of systematically killing South Vietnamese government officials, their families and acquaintances, and anyone in Huế who had any tangential relationship with or had endorsed the government of South Vietnam or the United States. Other objectives included the Tây Lộc Airfield and the Imperial Palace.

At the Chanh Tay gate (16.474°N 107.561°E) on the west wall of the Citadel, a six-man PAVN sapper team dressed in ARVN uniforms killed the guards and opened the gate. Upon their flashlight signals, the 800th Battalion and several teams from the 12th Sapper Battalion rushed through the gate and headed northwest towards Tây Lộc Airfield. A 40-man assault team that was tasked with attacking Mang Ca through a sewer found the entrance blocked and moved around to assault the Huu Gate (16.466°N 107.568°E) at the southwest corner of the Citadel; they were engaged by an ARVN machine gun and lost 24 men before seizing their objective. The 802nd Battalion and a heavy weapons company had some trouble crossing the canal outside the southeastern wall, but entered shortly thereafter. The 806th Battalion, which was dug into a cemetery along Highway 1 near the western corner of the Citadel, dispatched a group of soldiers to capture the An Hoa Bridge, driving off the RF detachment guarding the bridge and opening a line of communication with the other PAVN-VC in the Citadel. Meanwhile, the team of thirty sappers who had scaled the northwestern wall overpowered the guards standing watch at the An Hoa and Hau Gates, then opened their doors to the infantry company waiting outside. The combined force then headed for the Mang Ca compound with the goal of neutralizing Trưởng's headquarters before it had time to organize the city's defenders.

At 03:40, ten minutes behind schedule, elements of the PAVN 164th Artillery Regiment fired a barrage of 122 mm rockets into the new city from firing positions in the southwestern hills. PAVN soldiers also fired 130 82 mm mortar rounds into the Mang Ca Compound the opening minutes of the battle. Meanwhile, 4 km to the west of the city the PAVN 416th Battalion, 5th Regiment, as well as a local force company and a recoilless rifle company, swarmed into the villages of Thon Que Chu and Thon La Chu (16.481°N 107.504°E). At Thon La Chu a South Vietnamese official who was a VC agent had earlier used aid money to build a three-story concrete and steel bomb shelter for local villagers and the command group of the Huế City Front used this as its headquarters. Meanwhile, the 416th Battalion began fortifying the twin villages with spider holes, trenches and camouflaged fighting positions.

At 04:00 the PAVN reached the Tây Lộc Airfield, where 50 men of the Hac Bao reconnaissance company, reinforced by the 1st Division's 1st Ordnance Company, stopped the PAVN 800th Battalion. Although one battle account stated that the South Vietnamese "offered no strong resistance", the PAVN report acknowledged "the heavy enemy ARVN fire enveloped the entire airfield. By dawn, our troops were still unable to advance". The fighting for the airfield continued to seesaw, with first the ARVN having the upper hand and then the PAVN. Meanwhile, the PAVN 802nd Battalion moved north of Tây Lộc to attack Mang Ca. Although the PAVN battalion penetrated the division compound, an ad hoc 200-man defensive force of staff officers and clerks staved off the assaults. Trưởng called back most of the Hac Bao Company from the airfield to bolster the headquarters' defenses, which kept division headquarters secure. At 04:40 sappers captured the Huu Gate and the command group of the PAVN 6th Regiment entered the Citadel. Outside the Citadel walls sapper teams failed to destroy the Bach Ho and Trường Tiền Bridges after being ambushed by RF troops. The 150 ARVN at Tây Lộc Airfield withdrew east through the city, avoiding PAVN forces and sneaked into the Mang Ca compound shortly after 07:00, just in time to help repulse another major assault from the 802nd Battalion. The reconnaissance platoon, having made its way back into the city, defended the Imperial Palace but eventually had to retreat to Mang Ca. At 08:00, PAVN troops raised a liberation flag over the Citadel flag tower.

South of the river a reinforced company of the 2nd Sapper Battalion launched a simultaneous attack on the MACV Compound in the new city. The attackers were engaged by a machine gunner in a guard tower and troops in a bunker who were able to hold off the attack for long enough to allow others in the compound to form a cohesive defense. At 05:00 a reinforced company from the 1st Sapper Battalion attacked the compound from the east, but failed to penetrate the compound. After failing to take Mang Ca and the MACV Compound in their initial assaults, the PAVN-VC did not attempt to seize them again, instead keeping them under fire and generally adopting a defensive posture, this tactical mistake allowed the ARVN and U.S. to bring in the reinforcements that would eventually clear the city. East of the MACV Compound, a heavy weapons team from the 2nd Sapper Battalion attempted to destroy the. U.S. Army Signal Corp 513th microwave/tropo communications compound. Firing at long range, they missed their target and made no further effort to take the position. However the communications compound was kept in a defense position by sniper fire.

A company each from the 815th and 818th Battalions entered the western edge of the new city around 04:50, eighty minutes behind schedule. The 815th Battalion had been delayed because South Vietnamese paramilitaries had ambushed the battalion at a river crossing three kilometers south of the city. The main body of the 818th Battalion had left camp later than planned and had gotten lost on its way to the city. After battling RF troops who were guarding a series of four bridges over the canal, some of the PAVN troops crossed into the city and headed for a list of targets that included the Montagnard military school, the Civil Operations and Revolutionary Development Support (CORDS) center, the Le Loi transportation camp, the provincial administration complex and prison (16.461°N 107.586°E) and the Thừa Thiên Provincial Headquarters (16.462°N 107.5845°E). Other PAVN troops split off and attacked the Huế railway station and a police headquarters facility near the Bach Ho Railroad Bridge. PAVN troops also seized the Tu Dam Pagoda, just south of the canal, which they soon converted to the main command post for the southern wing.

Just before dawn the 804th Battalion reached the eastern outskirts of the new city, three hours behind schedule. Some elements of the battalion had been delayed by South Vietnamese paramilitary troops while others had gotten lost. With the city finally in sight, the three companies that made up the 804th Battalion headed off in different directions. One company occupied a six-way intersection on Highway 1 a few blocks southeast of the MACV Compound to prevent Allied mechanized forces from entering the city. The company also helped a group of sappers seize the Treasury Building (16.4654°N 107.5899°E), the post office and a radio station a few blocks to the north. The second company from the 804th Battalion seized the An Cuu Bridge while the third company stormed a smaller bridge over the canal a short distance to the west. At dawn the only areas of the new city still under Allied control were the prison defended by a Hac Bao platoon; the Le Loi transportation camp; the Huang Giang Hotel; the MACV Compound; the communications facility; and the Navy loading dock.

In the early morning a U.S. Army helicopter was shot down over the city; the crew sought refuge with a group of ARVN in a small compound. A U.S. Army UH-1 Huey piloted by Chief Warrant Officer Frederick Ferguson landed in the compound and rescued the crew under fire. For his actions Ferguson was subsequently awarded the Medal of Honor.

=== ARVN reinforcements ===
The embattled Trưởng called in reinforcements ordering all four battalions of the 3rd Regiment in the countryside to return to the Citadel, he also instructed two armored units, the 3rd Troop, 7th Cavalry, stationed at PK–17, and the tank-equipped 1st Troop, 7th Cavalry, at the Tam Thai camp southeast of new city to proceed to Mang Ca. Trưởng obtained permission from I Corps commander, General Hoàng Xuân Lãm, to take control of the 1st Airborne Task Force. Although the South Vietnamese 9th Airborne Battalion was caught up in the battle for Quảng Trị, the 2nd and 7th Airborne Battalions were available at PK–17. The armored troop at Tam Thai was first to respond to Trưởng's order. Shortly after 04:30, a column of M41 tanks and M113 armored personnel carriers (APCs) left the compound and headed up Highway 1. Shortly after the column crossed over the An Cuu Bridge over the Phu Cam Canal (16.5°N 107.6°E), however, soldiers from the 1st Sapper Battalion and the 818th Battalion, hiding in and around buildings near the road, opened fire at close range with rocket-propelled grenades, heavy machine guns and at least four 75 mm recoilless rifles. The ambush destroyed several vehicles and threw the 1st Troop, 7th Cavalry, into confusion. Several M41 crews abandoned their undamaged tanks when they found their escape route blocked by burning hulks.

Responding to the call at PK-17, at 09:00 the 3rd Troop and the 7th Battalion of the Airborne task force rolled out of their base area in an armored convoy onto Highway 1. A PAVN blocking force from the 806th Battalion in the graveyard stopped the ARVN relief force about 400 meters short of the Citadel wall destroying two M113s. The Airborne attempted a frontal assault on the graveyard but were unable to force their way through the PAVN positions and found themselves unable to advance or retreat and called for assistance. The 2nd Airborne Battalion reinforced the convoy and conducted a flanking attack. In the early morning hours of 1 February the PAVN withdrew and at midday a Hac Bao unit led the Airborne force into Mang Ca. The cost had been heavy: the ARVN suffered 131 casualties including 40 dead, and lost four of the 12 armored personnel carriers in the convoy. The ARVN claimed to have killed 250 PAVN, captured five prisoners and recovered 71 individual and 25 crew-served weapons.

The ARVN 3rd Regiment had an even more difficult time. On the 31st, two of its battalions, the 2nd and 3rd, advanced east from encampments southwest of the city along the northern bank of the Perfume River, but PAVN defensive fire forced them to fall back. Unable to enter the Citadel, the two battalions established their night positions outside the southeast wall of the Citadel. PAVN forces blocked the 1st and 4th Battalions of the regiment, operating to the southeast, as they attempted to reinforce the units in Huế. The 1st Battalion encountered the 810th Battalion which had been deployed to block the eastern approaches to the new city, running low on ammunition Captain Phan Ngoc Luong, the commander of the 1st Battalion, retreated with his unit to the coastal Ba Long outpost, arriving there with only three eight-round clips per man for their World War II vintage M1 Garand rifles. At Ba Long, the battalion then embarked upon motorized junks and reached the Citadel the following day. The 4th Battalion ran into a blocking force from the 2nd Sapper Battalion and a company from the 810th Battalion. The government troops tried to fight their way through but lacked the strength or the firepower to do so. Four days would pass before they were at last able to punch a hole in the PAVN-VC lines and reach the MACV compound.

South of the city, on 31 January Lieutenant Colonel Phan Hữu Chí, the commander of the ARVN 7th Armored Cavalry Squadron, attempted to break the PAVN-VC stranglehold. He led an armored column toward Huế, but like the other South Vietnamese units, found it impossible to break through. With the promise of U.S. Marine reinforcements, Chi's column, with three tanks in the lead, tried once more. This time they crossed the An Cuu Bridge into the new city. Coming upon the central police headquarters in southern Huế, the tanks attempted to relieve the police defenders, but a B-40 rocket made a direct hit on Chi's tank, killing him instantly. The South Vietnamese armor pulled back.

=== U.S. Marines ===
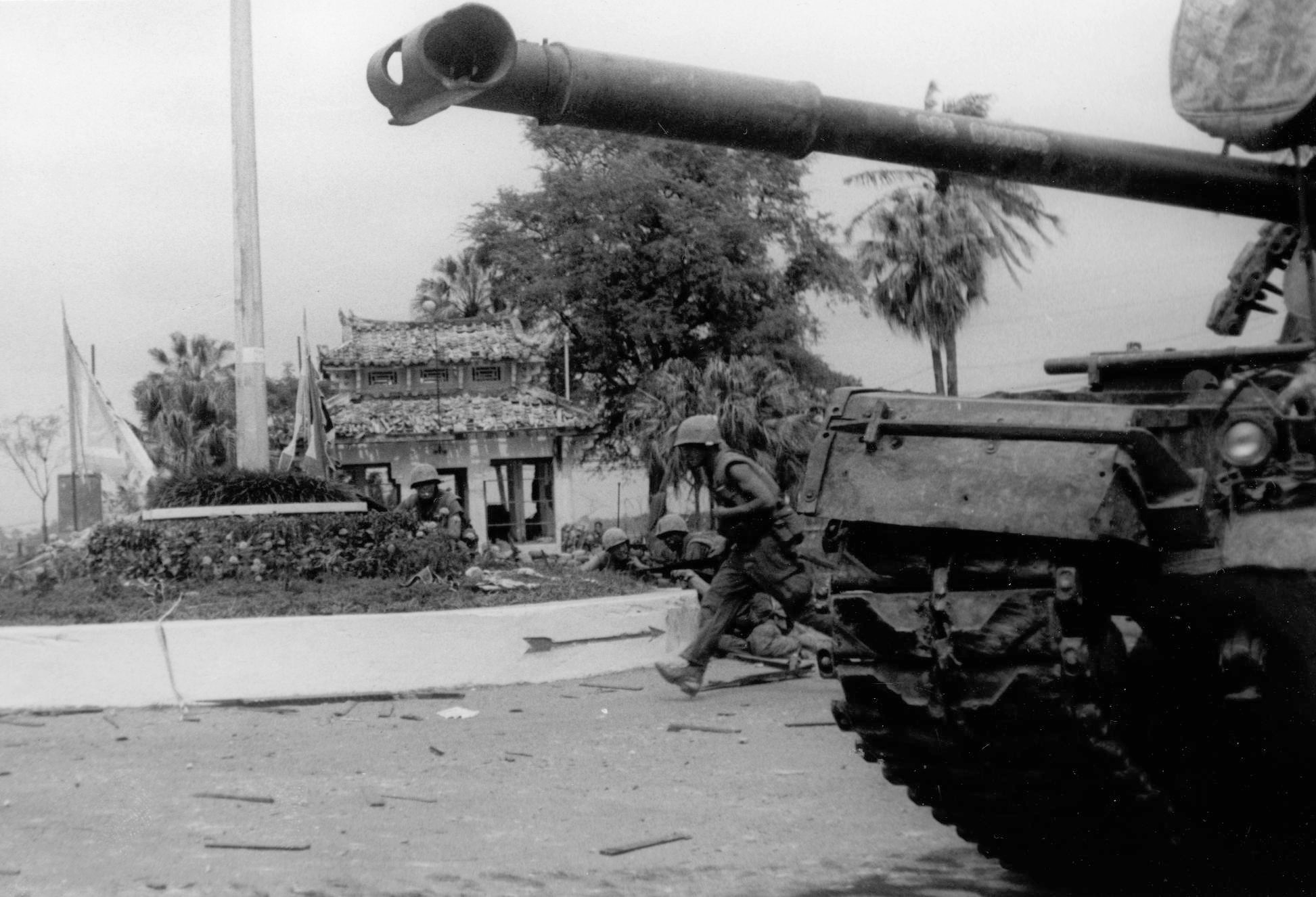
U.S. Marines clear buildings in southern Huế supported by tanks.

Three USMC battalions were protecting Phu Bai Combat Base, Highway 1 and all western approaches to Huế. This was an operational area that actually required two complete regiments to secure.

On the night of 30/31 January, the Marines faced rocket and mortar fire at the Phu Bai Combat Base and PAVN-VC infantry units hit Marine combined action platoons (CAP) and local Popular Force and RF units in the region, including the Truoi River and Phú Lộc sectors. At about 04:00 a PAVN company attacked the ARVN security detachment defending the Highway 1 bridge over the Truoi River (16.321°N 107.773°E) and the nearby CAP H-8. 1st Marine Regiment commander Colonel Stanley S. Hughes, ordered Captain George R. Christmas, commander of Company H, 2nd Battalion 5th Marines to relieve the CAP unit and Company H engaged the PAVN-VC as they withdrew from the CAP position. Seeing an opportunity to trap the PAVN-VC, Lieutenant Colonel Ernie Cheatham reinforced Company H with his Command Group and Company F. With his other companies in blocking positions, Cheatham hoped to pin the PAVN-VC against the Truoi River. However at 10:30, 31 January Company G was ordered to Phu Bai as the Task Force reserve and Company F was removed from Hughes' operational control later that afternoon. With the departure of Company F about 16:30, the PAVN-VC successfully disengaged and Companies H and E took up night defensive positions. 2/5 Marines killed 18 PAVN or VC and captured one, at a cost of three Marines killed and 13 wounded.

While the fighting continued in the Truoi River and the Phú Lộc sectors, the 1st Battalion, 1st Marines had begun to move into Huế. In the early morning of 31 January, after the rocket bombardment of the airfield and the initial attack on the Truoi River Bridge, Task Force X-Ray received reports of strikes all along Highway 1 between the Hải Vân Pass and Huế. All told, the PAVN-VC hit some 18 targets from bridges, CAP units, and company defensive positions. With Company A, 1/1 Marines as the Phu Bai reserve, Hughes directed Lieutenant Colonel Marcus Gravel to prepare the company for any contingency. At 06:30, Hughes ordered the company to reinforce the Truoi River Bridge. Captain Gordon Batcheller later recalled that "we were rousted up about 04:00 on the 31st and launched south on trucks to rendezvous with and reinforce ARVN forces about a map sheet and a half south of Phu Bai." The convoy was then turned around and sent towards Huế.

Up to this point the fighting for Huế had been entirely a South Vietnamese affair. Brigadier General Foster LaHue, the Task Force X-Ray commander, actually had very little reliable intelligence on the situation. All he knew was that Trưởng's headquarters had been under attack, as was the MACV Compound. Because of enemy mortaring of the LCU ramp in southern Huế, the allies had stopped all river traffic to the city. As LaHue later wrote: "Initial deployment of forces was made with limited information."

=== Initial U.S. Marines counter-attacks ===
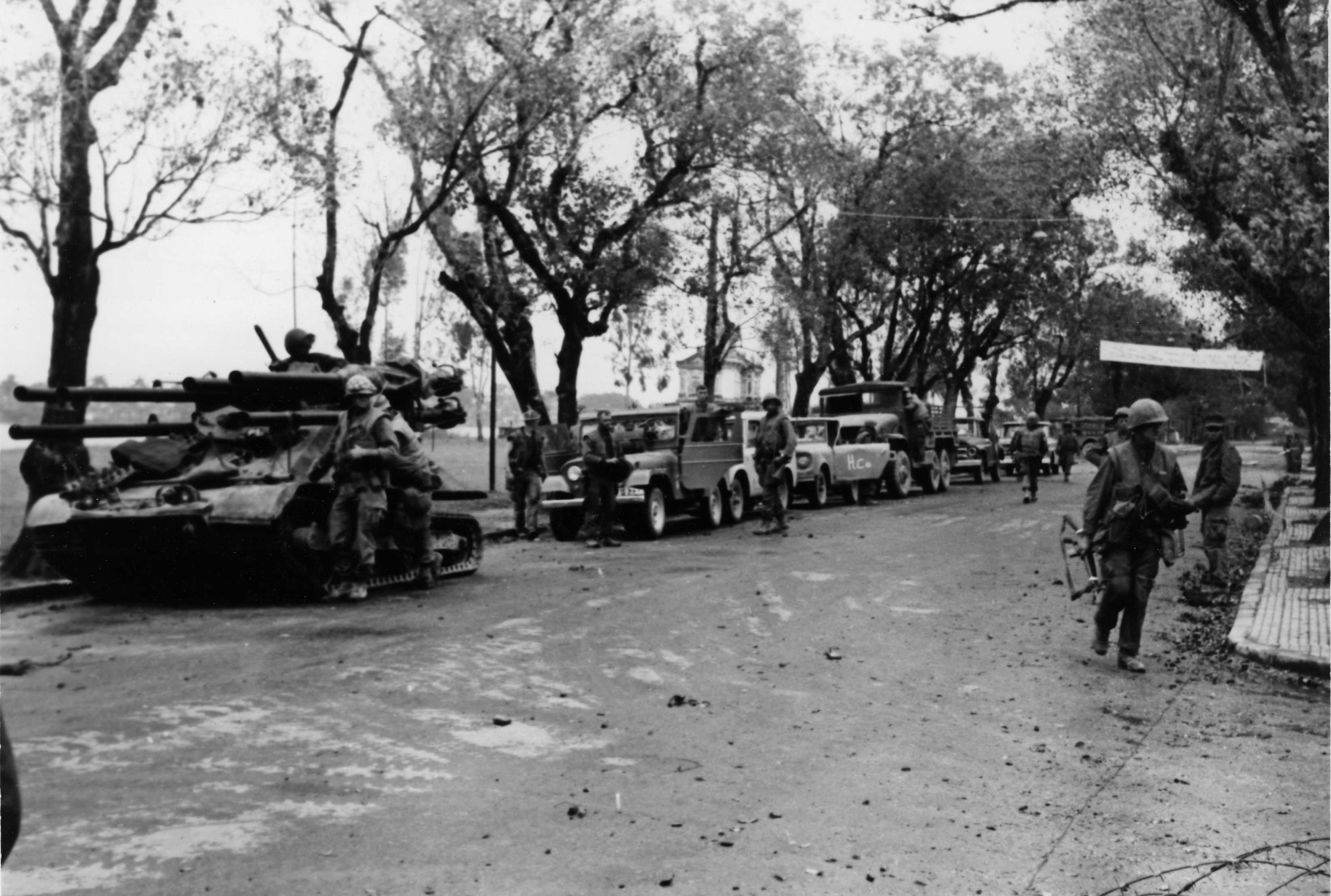
An M50 Ontos leads an evacuation convoy of commandeered vehicles, 31 January.

As the Marines approached the southern suburbs of the city they came under increasing fire from the PAVN 804th Battalion. In one village, the troops dismounted and cleared the houses on either side of the main street before proceeding. During this fighting Company A, 1/1 Marines commander Captain Batcheller was wounded and Gunnery Sergeant John L. Canley assumed command of the Company. He and Sergeant Alfredo Cantu Gonzalez led the Marines in the defense of the convoy, actions for which both men would later be awarded the Medal of Honor. The Marine convoy stopped several times to eliminate resistance in heavy house-to-house fighting before proceeding again. At about 15:15 the Marines managed to make their way toward the MACV Compound. By this time, the PAVN-VC attackers had pulled back their forces from the immediate vicinity of the Compound. Gravel met with Army Colonel George O. Adkisson, the senior U.S. advisor to the ARVN 1st Division.

Leaving Company A behind to secure the MACV Compound, Gravel took Company G, reinforced by the three M48 tanks from the 3rd Tank Battalion and a few ARVN M24 light tanks from the 7th Armored Cavalry Squadron, and attempted to cross the Trường Tiền Bridge, the main bridge over the Perfume River. Gravel left the armor behind on the southern bank to provide direct fire support. As he later remembered, the American M48s were too heavy for the bridge and the ARVN tankers "refused to go." As the Marine infantry started across, a machine gun on the other end of the bridge opened fire, killing and wounding several marines. One Marine, Lance corporal Lester A. Tully, later awarded the Silver Star for his action, ran forward, threw a grenade, and silenced the gun. Two platoons successfully made their way to the other side. They turned left and immediately came under automatic weapons and recoilless rifle fire from the Citadel wall. The Marines decided to withdraw. This was easier said than done as the PAVN-VC were well dug-in and firing from virtually every building in the Citadel. With the number of wounded rising, the Marines commandeered some abandoned Vietnamese civilian vehicles and used them as makeshift ambulances to carry out the wounded. Among the casualties on the bridge was Major Walter M. Murphy, the 1st Battalion S-3, or operations officer, who later died of his wounds.

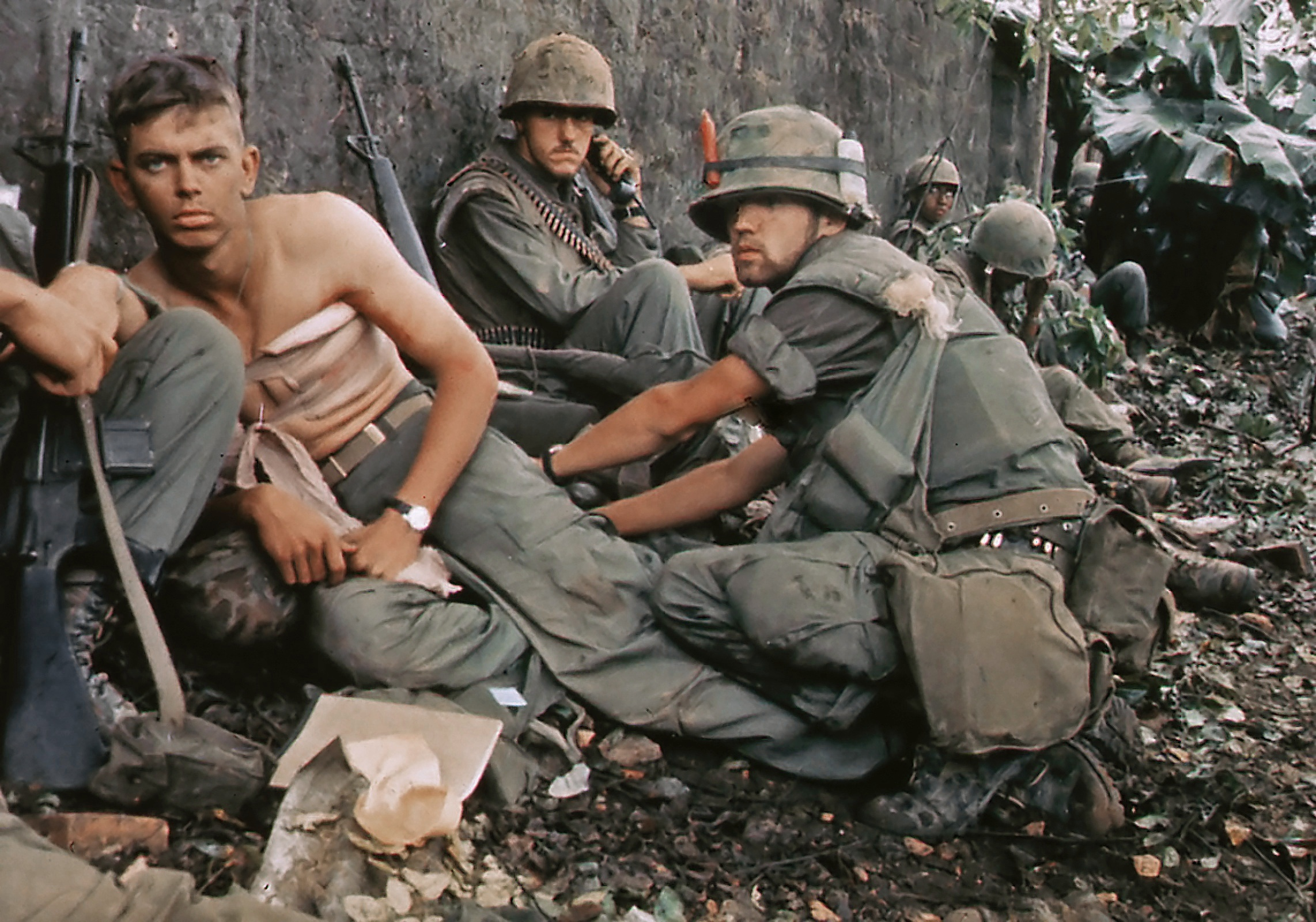
Wounded U.S. Marines being treated during the battle

By 20:00, the 1/1 Marines had established defensive positions near the MACV Compound and a helicopter landing zone in a field just west of the Navy LCU Ramp in southern Huế. On that first day, the two Marine companies in Huế had sustained casualties of 10 killed and 56 wounded. During the night, the battalion called helicopter into the landing zone to take out the most badly wounded. The American command still had little realization of the situation in Huế.

North of the Perfume River, on 1 February, the ARVN 1st Division enjoyed some limited success. Although the 2nd and 3rd Battalions of the 3rd Regiment remained outside of the Citadel walls, unable to penetrate the PAVN defenses; the 2nd and 7th Airborne Battalions, supported by armored personnel carriers and the Hac Bao Company, recaptured the Tây Lộc airfield.

At about 15:00, the ARVN 1st Battalion, 3rd Regiment reached the 1st Division command post at the Mang Ca compound. Later that day, U.S. Marine helicopters from HMM-165 brought part of the ARVN 4th Battalion, 2nd Regiment from Đông Hà Combat Base into the Citadel. Eight CH-46 Sea Knight helicopters made the flight in marginal weather with a 61–152 metres (200–500 ft) ceiling and 1.6 kilometres (1 mi) visibility, arriving at an improvised landing zone under enemy mortar fire. The deteriorating weather forced the squadron to cancel the remaining lifts with about half of the battalion in the Citadel.

Shortly after 15:00, Company F, 2/5 Marines made a helicopter landing into southern Huế. They were to relieve a MACV Microwave/Tropo communications facility approximately 2.5 km southeast of the MACV Compound surrounded by a VC force. Operated by the United States Army Signal Corps 513th Signal Detachment, 337th Signal Company, 37th Signal Battalion, it was the main communications link for the Huế area, the DMZ and for the besieged Khe Sanh Combat Base. The company spent the better part of the afternoon trying to reach the isolated communications site. They were unsuccessful and Company F sustained casualties of three dead and 13 wounded.

=== Attacks by 1st Cavalry Division on PAVN supply lines ===
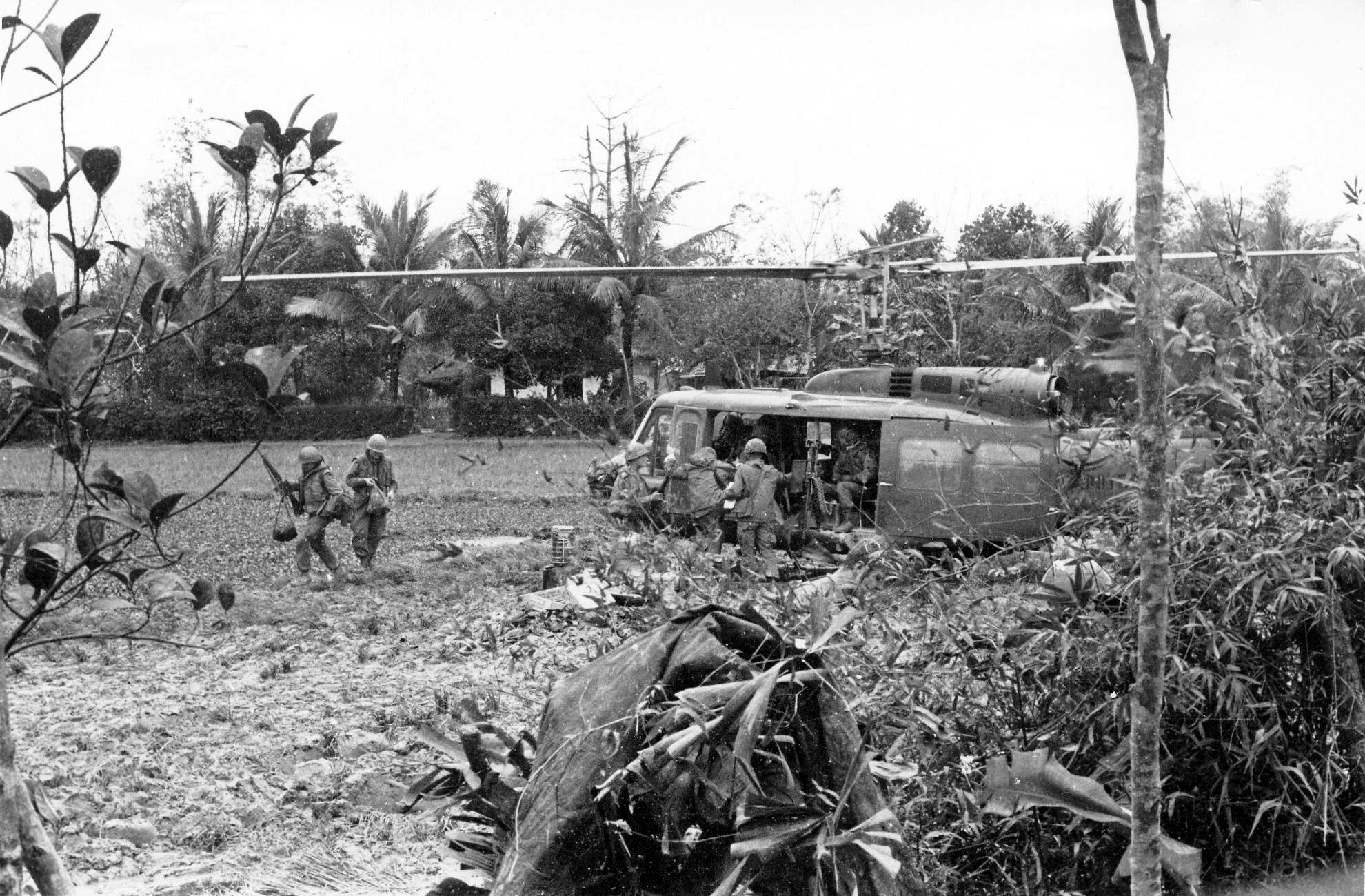
1st Cavalry Division helicopter resupply mission northwest of Hue

On 20 January, the 1st Cavalry Division began moving from Landing Zone English in Bình Định Province 350 km north to Camp Evans as part of Operation Checkers. While the helicopters and men of the Division were soon in position, most of their heavy and support equipment was loaded on trucks that would have to proceed by convoy up Highway 1. While a new supply port was being constructed on the coast, the Division relied on the Marine supply base at Tân Mỹ and supply convoys along Highway 1 from Da Nang. On the night of 31 January, the PAVN-VC launched a mortar attack on Camp Evans which caused an ammunition dump to explode, disabling most of the helicopters of the 229th Assault Helicopter Battalion. Other attacks along Highway 1 damaged or destroyed 20 bridges and 26 culverts between the Hải Vân Pass and Phu Bai and Highway 1 was closed to convoy traffic until early March.

On 1 February, III Marine Amphibious Force (III MAF) Commander Lieutenant General Robert Cushman alerted the 1st Cavalry Division commander, Major General John J. Tolson, to be ready to deploy his 3rd Brigade into a sector west of Huế. By 22:15 that night, Tolson's command had agreed with III MAF on its designated area of operations in the Huế sector. Tolson's plan called for an air assault by two battalions of the 3rd Brigade northwest of Huế. The 2nd Battalion, 12th Cavalry was to arrive in the landing zone first, followed by the 5th Battalion, 7th Cavalry to be inserted near PK-17. Attacking in a southeasterly direction, the two battalions would then attempt to close the PAVN-VC supply line into Huế.

During the mid-afternoon of 2 February, the 2/12th Cavalry arrived in a landing zone about 10 kilometres (6 mi) northwest of Huế. The Cavalry force soon encountered two dug-in PAVN Battalions around the villages of Thon Que Chu and Thon La Chu which they were unable to overcome as fog prevented their usual gunship support. The 2/12th Cavalry withdrew to a night defensive perimeter, but at dawn on 3 February following a mortar barrage the PAVN attacked their position. This was only beaten back with heavy artillery fire. Losses continued to mount throughout the day from mortar and small arms fire and that night the Battalion commander decided to breakout from the encirclement by a night march to an ARVN position on Nha Nanh hill (16.4598°N 107.506°E) from where they could be resupplied and the casualties medevaced. On reaching the ARVN base, the 2/12th Cavalry dug in there for the next 4 days.

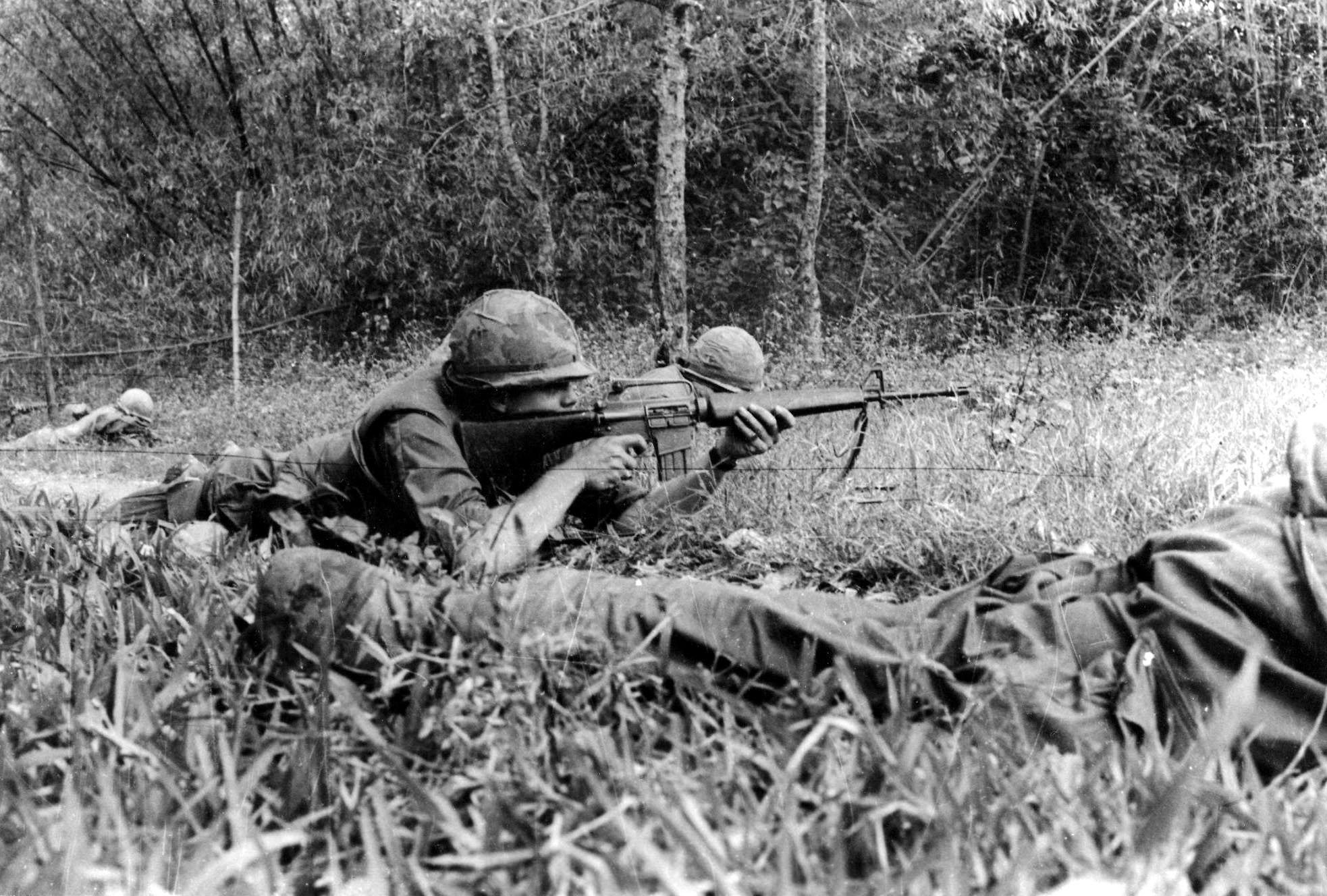
5/7th Cavalry in action at Thon La Chu

On 8 February 5/7th Cavalry began moving southwest from PK-17 towards La Chu while 2/12th Cavalry were ordered to retrace their route to form the southern pincer for an attack on the PAVN stronghold. As the 5/7th Cavalry approached Que Chu the command and control helicopter was shot down by anti-aircraft fire, the crew was rescued by a dustoff helicopter. Company B then walked into an ambush north of Que Chu and was pinned down in the open with little cover, they were only able to withdraw after calling in close artillery support. Company D was also engaged by PAVN in the village of Lieu Coc and forced to withdraw. 1/7th Cavalry then dug in to night defensive positions. On 9 February 5/7th Cavalry resumed their advance with artillery support from PK-17 and naval gunfire; they overran Lieu Coc finding PAVN bodies and fighting positions. As they moved closer to La Chu, PAVN resistance increased and it was obvious that this was a major PAVN base. 5/7th Cavalry would be stalled north of La Chu for 2 weeks, probing but failing to penetrate the PAVN defenses.

On 16 February deputy COMUSMACV General Creighton Abrams flew into PK-17 for a meeting with Tolson where Abrams expressed his displeasure at the Cavalry's slow progress. Following this visit two more battalions (1st Battalion, 7th Cavalry Regiment and 2nd Battalion, 501st Infantry Regiment) and additional air and artillery support were committed to the attack on La Chu.

On 21 February following intensive radar-guided airstrikes and artillery strikes, the four battalions launched a four-pronged attack from the north, west and south on Que Chu and La Chu. The PAVN strongly defended the perimeter, but once the Cavalry forces broke through with the support of two newly arrived M42 Dusters, they found that the base had been largely abandoned while the Cavalry had been building up their forces for the attack. The Cavalry had finally captured the PAVN's main support base, but were still 8 km from the Citadel. Sergeant Joe Hooper of the 2/501st would subsequently be awarded the Medal of Honor for his actions in this engagement.

On the morning of 22 February, the 1/7th Cavalry, remained in Thon Que Chu and Thon La Chu to mop up pockets of resistance while the remaining units under 3rd Brigade control began marching toward the Citadel. They advanced along parallel tracks, with the 5/7th Cavalry, following the course of Highway 1; the 2/501st Infantry, searching the central route; and the 2/12th Cavalry, sweeping the area to the south. In mid-morning the 5/7th Cavalry, came under heavy fire from an estimated company-size force who occupied the hamlet of Thon An, approximately one kilometer from the An Hoa Bridge. Helicopter gunships and artillery and the pair of Dusters systematically leveled any structure that appeared to serve as a strong point. The supporting fire continued throughout the day, but the PAVN did not abandon their positions. With darkness approaching the attack was postponed until the next morning. Meanwhile, several kilometers to the south, the 2/12th Cavalry, made contact with another PAVN force just before noon. Several companies of PAVN armed with mortars, machine guns, recoilless rifles and RPGs were strongly entrenched along the south side of the Sau Canal, a deep waterway that ran toward the Citadel perpendicular to the Perfume River. On 23 February, the 2/12th Cavalry and the 2/501st Infantry, resumed their battle at the Sau Canal. The PAVN occupied a rectangular slice of land between the canal and the Perfume River that was approximately fifteen hundred meters wide and less than a kilometer deep, however U.S. efforts to overrun this position were repeatedly repulsed as the PAVN fought to keep open their escape route from the Citadel.

The 3rd Brigade would not reach the west wall of the Citadel until 25 February by which time the PAVN-VC had successfully withdrawn from the battlefield. It was estimated that it would have taken at least 16 battalions to establish an effective cordon around Huế, at this time there were only 30 battalions available in all of I Corps.

=== Recapture of southern Huế ===
On the night of 1/2 February PAVN sappers successfully brought down the Bach Ho (railroad) bridge across the Perfume River, restricting movement from the south towards the Citadel, but failed to destroy the An Cuu Bridge over the Phu Cam Canal.

On 2 February, the Marines made some minor headway and brought in further reinforcements. A company from the 2/5th Marines finally relieved the MACV communications facility that morning. Gravel launched a two-company assault supported by tanks towards the Provincial Headquarters and Thua Thien Prison, seven blocks west of the MACV Compound where the ARVN were believed to still be holding out. The Marines did not progress further than one block before their advance was halted by troops from the PAVN 815th Battalion and after three hours of room to room fighting, the Marines captured the Huế University building at the base of the Trường Tiền Bridge (16.467°N 107.590°E) two blocks northwest of the MACV Compound, so reducing enemy fire towards the LCU ramp. The Marines then tried to assault the Treasury Building in the next block, but were stopped by fire from the 100 plus PAVN defenders and flanking fire from the Le Loi Elementary School (16.4647°N 107.5909°E). The battalion consolidated its night defensive positions and waited to renew its attack the following day.

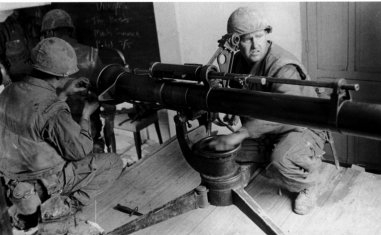
U.S. Marines deploy a 106 mm recoilless rifle from within Huế University to target a PAVN machine gun emplacement.

About 11:00, Company H, 2/5 Marines, crossed the An Cuu Bridge in an armed convoy. As the convoy, accompanied by Army trucks equipped with quad .50 machine guns and two M50 Ontos, entered the city, enemy snipers opened up on the Marine reinforcements. Near the MACV Compound, the Marines came under heavy machine gun and rocket fire. The Army gunners and the Marine Ontos quickly responded. In the resulting confusion, the convoy exchanged fire with a Marine unit already in the city. About mid-day, the PAVN continued to block any advance to the south. A 75 mm recoilless rifle knocked out one of the supporting tanks. By the end of the day, the Marines had sustained two dead and 34 wounded and claimed to have killed nearly 140 PAVN-VC. That night the PAVN 815th Battalion overran the ARVN defenders at the Thua Thien Prison releasing the 2,500 prisoners, including 350 VC who were soon armed with captured ARVN weapons and joined the fighting.

Back at Phu Bai, Cheatham was reviewing Marine urban fighting doctrine which recommended staying off the streets and moving forward by blasting through walls and buildings. He proceeded to gather the necessary equipment including M20 Bazookas, M40 106 mm recoilless rifles mounted on M274 Mules, C-4 explosive, flamethrowers, tear gas and gas masks. This equipment was loaded onto a convoy which arrived at the MACV Compound at 13:00 on 3 February. Cheatham then joined his company commanders in Huế University and they proceeded to develop the tactics to be used in recapturing southern Huế.

Many of the Marines of Task Force X-Ray had little or no urban combat experience and the U.S. troops were not trained for urban close-quarters combat, so this battle was especially tough for them. Due to Huế's religious and cultural status, Allied forces were ordered not to bomb or shell the city, for fear of destroying the historic structures. Also, since it was still monsoon season with heavy rain and low clouds on many days during the battle, it was virtually impossible for the U.S. forces to use air support. But as the intensity of the battle increased, the policy was eliminated. PAVN tactics were to hold the Marines close, negating the use of artillery and air support. A forward fighting line was maintained directly opposite the Marines with a secondary line two blocks back. Each building on the fighting lines was defended by snipers and machine guns, while spider holes were dug in gardens and streets, creating cross-fire between all buildings and streets. If the Marines penetrated the forward line the PAVN moved to the secondary line and then reoccupied the abandoned positions at night.

On the night of 3 February, the PAVN commander, seeing the buildup of Marines at Huế University, thinned out his frontline forces leaving just a platoon to defend the Treasury building and adjacent Post Office . On the morning of 4 February the Marines launched their attack on the Treasury. The initial assault was on the left flank by Company A, 1/1 Marines which was tasked with securing a Catholic chapel and the Jeanne d'Arc High School (16.4651°N 107.5915°E). The Marines secured the chapel and the east school building, but were pinned down for hours by interlocking fire from the west building. During this action Sergeant Gonzalez was killed while firing on PAVN machine gun positions. The Marines eventually broke into the west building and cleared it room by room. Due to the delays on the left flank, the main assault in the center by Company F, 2/5 Marines was delayed until mid-afternoon. The Treasury building was hit by M48 and 106 mm fire and tear gas, while a M274 Mule-mounted 106 mm recoilless rifle engaged the machine gun in the Le Loi Elementary School. Under cover of the tear gas and the 106 mm backblast the Marines crossed the street and blew holes in the wall using C-4 and Bazookas. The Marines then pushed into the Treasury building which the PAVN had hastily abandoned. The Post Office also seemed abandoned until the Marines located a vault inside the building, they proceeded to gas out the PAVN inside killing more than 24 of them as they emerged. After securing the Jeanne d'Arc High School, Company A, 1/1 Marines recaptured the Le Loi Elementary School. More than half the company's 147 men had been wounded or killed in that day's fighting. That evening VC sappers succeeded in blowing up the An Cuu bridge, cutting the road link to Phu Bai.

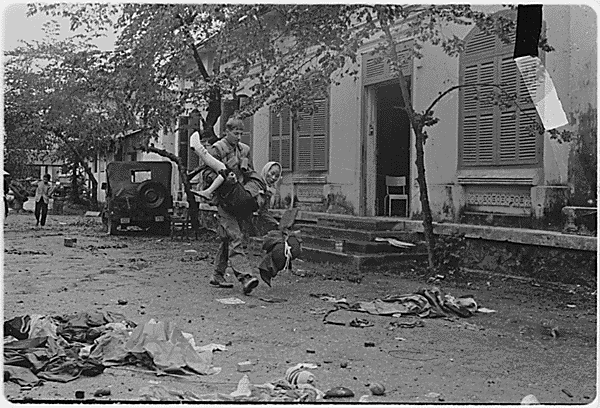
A U.S. Marine carries an elderly Vietnamese civilian from Huế Hospital.

Following the capture of the Treasury, Cheatham continued his methodical advance to the west leading with tear gas, M48s and Ontos, followed by Mules and Marines, while PAVN-VC resistance lessened as its manpower and ammunition was depleted. The PAVN-VC no longer tenaciously defended each building, relying more on sniper fire, mortars and rockets. On 5 February the Marines recaptured the Huế Central Hospital complex (16.463°N 107.587°E), rescuing Lieutenant Colonel Pham Van Khoa (the Mayor of Huế and Thua Thien Province chief), who had been hiding in the grounds.

On 6 February the Marines attacked the Provincial Headquarters which served as the command post of the PAVN 4th Regiment. While the Marines seized the surrounding wall easily, the area between the wall and the building was covered by fire from every window and from spider-holes in the grounds. An Ontos was brought forward to blast an entry into the building, but was disabled by a B-40 rocket. A Mule was brought forward to blow a hole in the building and the Marines advanced under cover of tear gas. Entering the building the Marines fought room by room, clearing the building, but many of the PAVN slipped away. With the building secured the Marines then methodically cleared out the spider-holes, shooting their occupants. The Marines raised an American flag to celebrate their victory, but shortly thereafter were ordered to lower it, as according to South Vietnamese law, no American flag was permitted to be flown without an accompanying South Vietnamese flag. After resting his men at the Provincial Headquarters, Cheatham resumed his advance west towards the Phu Cam Canal, then swung south and east to clear the area with the canal to his right.

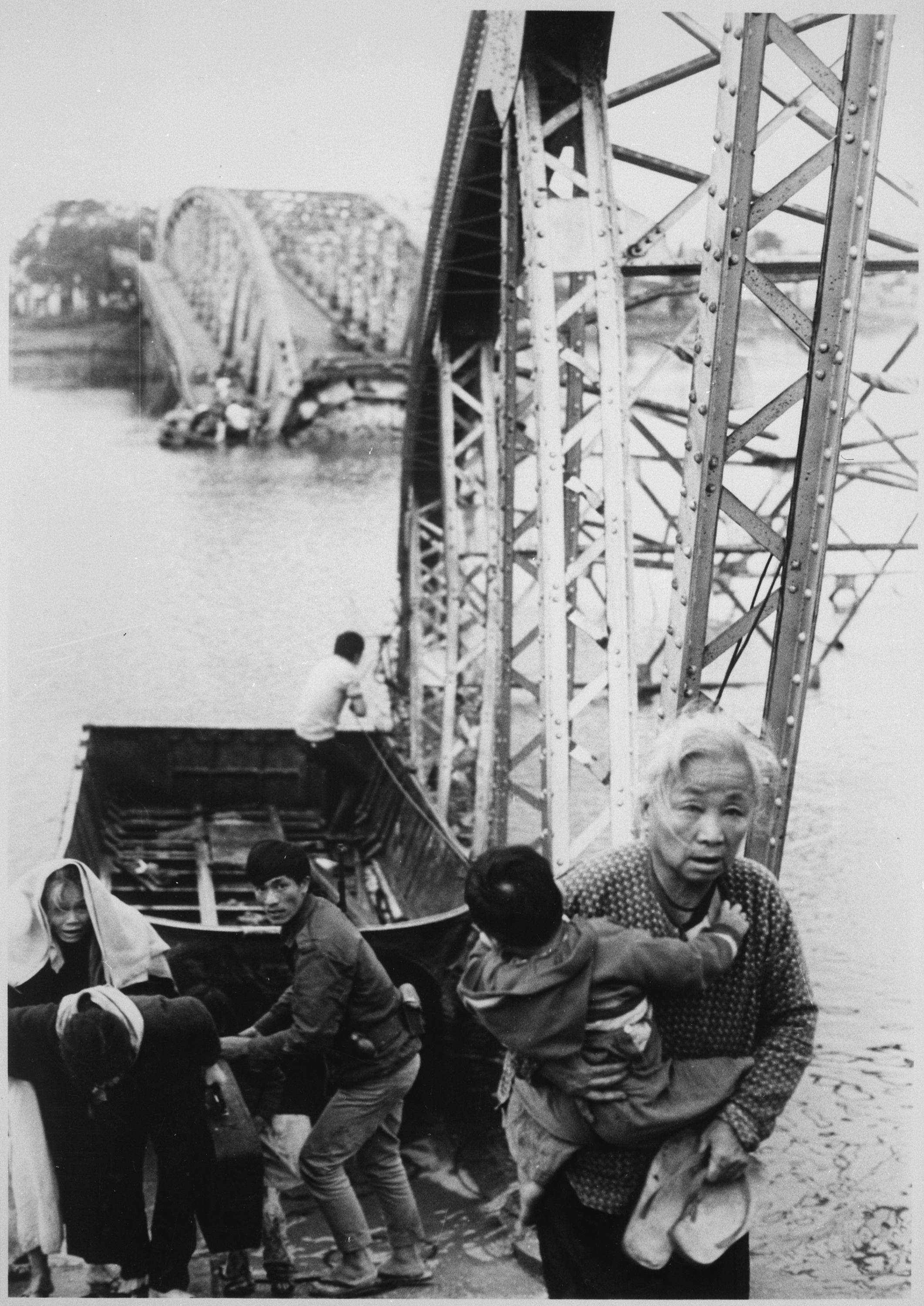
Vietnamese civilians cross the destroyed Trường Tiền Bridge.

On 7 February the PAVN twice ambushed a 25 vehicle supply convoy supported by two Ontos going along Route 547 (16.434°N 107.597°E) from Phu Bai to the 11th Marines Firebase Rockcrusher (16.393°N 107.569°E) which provided artillery support to Allied forces fighting in and around Huế. These ambushes killed 20 marines and wounded 39. PAVN sappers finally destroyed the Trường Tiền bridge restricting movement between the old and new cities. The PAVN forces in the new city, worn down by more than a week of incessant combat and effectively cut off from their comrades on the other side of the river, began to slowly abandon the city, the 815th and 2nd Sapper Battalions moved to the southern side of the Phu Cam Canal, where the 818th Battalion was already in place. The 804th Battalion and the 1st Sapper Battalion remained south of the canal near the An Cuu Bridge while the 810th Battalion began preparing to sneak west across the Perfume River by raft and boat to Gia Hoi Island.

Gravel's 1/1 Marines had been clearing the area to the east and south of the MACV Compound and on 10 February they captured the soccer stadium (16.467°N 107.597°E), providing a second, safer helicopter landing zone. A pontoon bridge had been built across the Phu Cam Canal, restoring the road access that had been lost when the An Cuu Bridge was blown up.

On 11 February Company H, 2/5 Marines secured a bridge over the Phu Cam Canal (16.457°N 107.578°E) and the block on the opposite side of the canal. The next day Company F swept the west bank of the canal, fighting through houses and the Huế Railway Station that had been sheltering PAVN snipers, before withdrawing back across the bridge. On 13 February Companies F and H crossed the bridge again with the aim of securing the entire area. As the Marines advanced into the open countryside towards the Từ Đàm Pagoda they located fresh PAVN graves and then were hit by a barrage of mortar fire, forcing them to withdraw. The Marines had inadvertently located the PAVN headquarters for the battle. On 13 February, Abrams established MACV Forward at Phu Bai, effectively replacing Cushman and assuming overall control of all U.S. forces in I Corps.

=== Battle for the Citadel ===
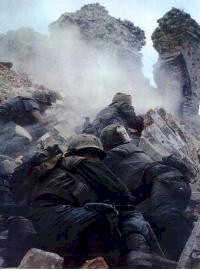
U.S. Marines assault the Dong Ba Gate in the Citadel.

Within the ARVN 1st Battalion, 3rd Regiment and 2nd and 7th Airborne Battalions cleared out the north and western parts of the Citadel including the Chanh Tay Gate, while the 4th Battalion, 2nd Regiment moved south from Mang Ca towards the Imperial Palace, killing over 700 PAVN-VC by 4 February. On 5 February Trưởng exchanged the Airborne with the 4th Battalion, which had become stalled. The 4th Battalion, 3rd Regiment, south of the river, crossed the river and assaulted the Thuong Tu Gate near the eastern corner of the Citadel. When seven successive attempts to breach the gate failed, the battalion joined the 2nd and 3rd Battalions, 3rd Regiment, near the southern corner of the Citadel. On 6 February, the 1st Battalion captured the An Hoa Gate on the northwest corner of the Citadel and the 4th Battalion captured the southwest wall. On the night of the 6th, the PAVN counterattacked, with a battalion from the 29th Regiment scaling the southwest wall and pushing the 4th Battalion back to Tây Lộc. On the 7th the 3rd Regiment, which had been futilely trying to break into the southeast corner of the Citadel, was moved by Mike boats to Mang Ca to reinforce his units inside the Citadel. The ARVN 2nd Troop, 7th Cavalry, equipped with fifteen M113s arrived at Mang Ca from Quảng Trị to relieve the 3rd Troop. To avoid ambushes it turned off Highway 1 a few kilometers north of the city, traveled east cross-country, and swung around the rear of Mang Ca through the Trai Gate.

Also on 7 February, the North Vietnamese tried to bring their own air support into the battle, sending four Vietnam People's Air Force Il-14 transport aircraft from an airfield near Hanoi. Two of the aircraft carrying explosives, antitank ammunition and field telephone cables managed to find an opening in the cloud layer about 10 kilometers (6.2 mi) north of Huế. They dropped their cargoes in a large lagoon for local forces to retrieve. One of the aircraft returned safely; but the other, flying through dense fog, crashed into a mountain, losing all on board. Meanwhile, the other two Il−14s, which had been modified to drop bombs, had orders to bomb Mang Ca. Neither flight crew could find the city in the fog, however, and both aircraft returned to North Vietnam without dropping their bombs. They tried again five days later, but once again, bad weather prevented them from locating Mang Ca. The two aircraft radioed that they were scrubbing the mission, then headed out to sea to jettison their bombs. A short time later, their transmissions went dead and they were never heard from again.

On 10 February two forward observers from the Marines' 1st Field Artillery Group were flown into Tây Lộc to help coordinate artillery and naval gunfire to support the fighting within the Citadel, however Trưởng instructed them that the Imperial Palace was not to be fired on. On 11 February the Vietnamese Marines Task Force A comprising the 1st and 5th Battalions, began to be lifted by helicopter into Mang Ca to replace the Airborne, however due to poor weather this deployment would not be completed until 13 February. At 10:45 on 11 February Company B, 1st Battalion, 5th Marines was airlifted aboard Marine CH-46s into Mang Ca, but enemy fire forced several of the helicopters to return to Phu Bai. The Marines together with five M48s from the 1st Tank Battalion would later be loaded onto Mike boats at the LCU ramp in southern Huế and ferried across to Mang Ca.

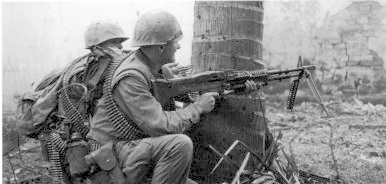
A U.S. Marine fires his M60 machine gun during the fight for the Citadel.

On 13 February Companies A and C, 1/5 Marines left Mang Ca and moved south along the eastern wall of the Citadel, while Company B remained in reserve. Unknown to the Marines, the ARVN Airborne had withdrawn from the area two days previously when the Vietnamese Marines began to arrive at Mang Ca and the PAVN defenders had used this opportunity to reoccupy several blocks and reinforce their defenses, Company A was engaged by the PAVN and quickly suffered 35 casualties. The 1/5 Marines commander Major Robert Thompson ordered Company B up to relieve Company A and the advance continued slowly until it was halted by PAVN flanking fire from the Dong Ba Gate (16.477°N 107.583°E). On 14 February the Marines resumed their attack supported by Marine and Navy gun fire and Marine close air support. Despite this they made little progress, as they had to withdraw when supporting fire was called in and the PAVN quickly reoccupied abandoned positions. After a day of attacks the Marines withdrew to their night defensive positions. Company D, 1/5 Marines arrived in the Citadel on the evening of 14 February after taking fire while crossing the Perfume River. On 15 February Company D led the renewed attack against the Dong Ba Gate with Company C defending its flank. Company B joined the assault and after six hours the Marines had secured the base of the gate and later the entire gate, at a cost of six Marines killed and 50 wounded and 20 PAVN killed. Overnight the PAVN counterattacked and briefly regained control of the gate before being forced out by Company D.

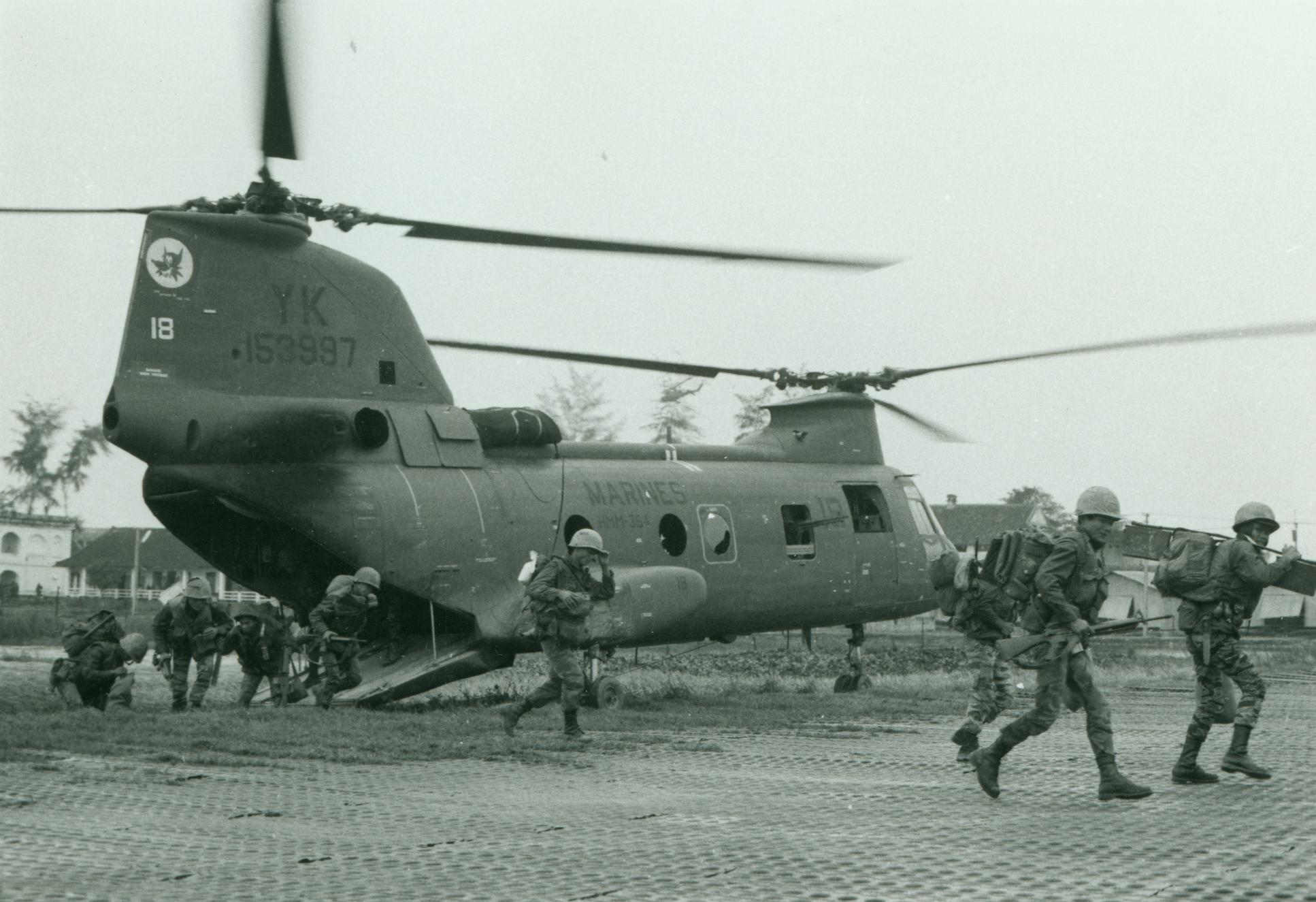
A CH-46 from HMM-364 lands South Vietnamese Marines at Huế on 23 February.

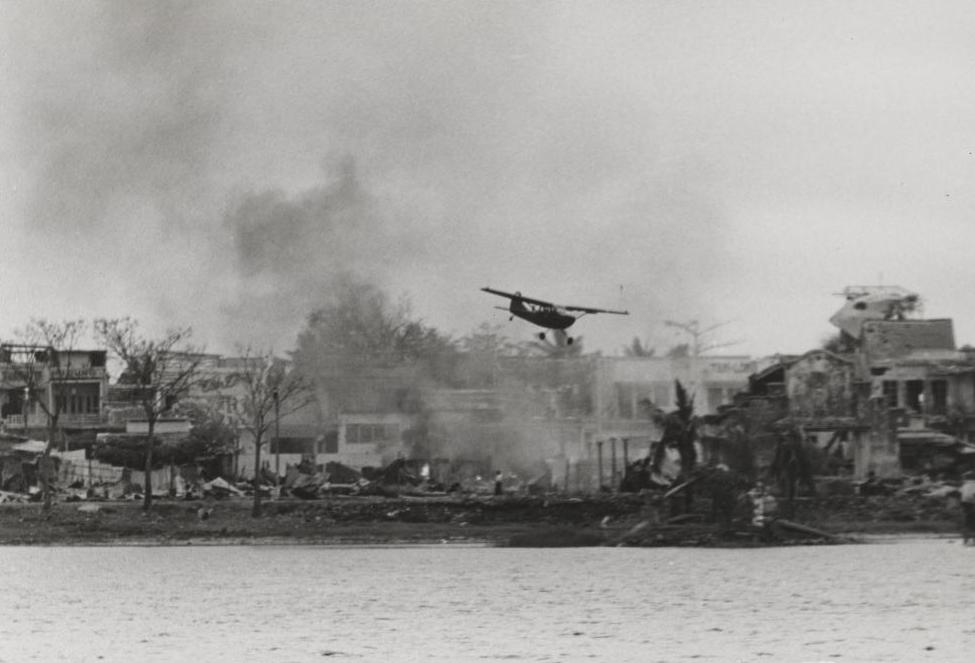
A U.S. Marines O-1 flies past the Citadel.

Also on 14 February the South Vietnamese Marine Task Force A joined the battle. The operational plan was for the Marines to move west from Tây Lộc and then turn south. However, they were soon stopped by strong PAVN defenses; after two days the Vietnamese Marines had only advanced 400 meters. Meanwhile, the ARVN 3rd Regiment fought off a PAVN counterattack in the northwest corner of the Citadel.

Despite their reducing hold on the city the PAVN seemed determined to prolong the battle for the Citadel. The 6th Battalion, 24th Regiment, 304th Division, originally located near Khe Sanh, reached the Citadel after following a route that took it through Base Area 101, Base Area 114 and Thon La Chu and the 7th Battalion, 90th Regiment, 324B Division, was due to arrive a few days later after a forced march from the DMZ. On 16 February two companies from the 1st Battalion, 8th Cavalry Regiment, fought elements of the 803rd Regiment, 324B Division, about 20 kilometers (12 mi) northeast of Huế, killing 29 PAVN before they broke contact the following day.

On 16 February the 1/5 Marines advanced approximately 140 meters for a cost of seven Marines killed and 47 wounded and 63 PAVN killed. That day at a meeting at Phu Bai between Generals Abrams, LaHue, Trưởng and South Vietnamese Vice President Nguyễn Cao Kỳ, Kỳ approved the use of all necessary force to clear the PAVN-VC forces from the Citadel, regardless of damage to historic structures. On the night of 16 February a radio intercept indicated that a battalion-size PAVN force was about to launch a counterattack over the west wall of the Citadel. Artillery and naval gunfire was called in and a later radio intercept indicated that a senior PAVN officer had been killed in the barrage. Later that night a radio message from the commander of PAVN forces in the Citadel was intercepted, he stated that his predecessor had been killed and requested permission to withdraw from the city, but this was denied and he was told to stand and fight. On 17 February the Vietnamese Marines and ARVN 3rd Regiment resumed their attacks south, while the Hac Bao Company was moved to support the right flank of the 1/5 Marines. Over the next three days these forces would slowly reduce the PAVN's perimeter. On 18 February the 1/8th Cavalry was attacked by elements of the 803rd Regiment 20 kilometers (12 mi) northeast of Huế, this second clash apparently convinced the PAVN command that the Regiment could not reach the Citadel.

By 20 February the 1/5 Marines advance had stalled and after conferring with his commanders Thompson decided to launch a night attack against three PAVN strongpoints that were blocking further movement with the entire battalion attacking at daybreak. At 03:00 on 21 February, three ten-man teams from 2nd Platoon of Company A launched their assault, quickly capturing the sparsely defended strongpoints which the PAVN had withdrawn from overnight. As the PAVN moved to reoccupy the strongpoints at dawn they were caught in the open by the Marines, 16 PAVN were killed for the loss of three Marines. The Marines were now only 100 meters from the south wall of the Citadel. That evening Company B was replaced by Company L, 3rd Battalion, 5th Marines. Unknown to the ARVN and the U.S., on the night of 20 February the PAVN had begun a phased withdrawal from the Citadel, leaving through the Huu and Nha Do (16.464°N 107.575°E) Gates and making their way southwest to return to their bases in the hills.

At 09:30 on 22 February, Company A, 1/5 Marines led the day's attack to find that the PAVN had largely disappeared and the south wall was soon secured. Company L, 3/5 Marines was then tasked with clearing the area to the Thuong Tu Gate and out to the Trường Tiền Bridge. Advancing with tank and air support they completed the mission meeting little resistance.

To the west, the South Vietnamese forces continued to meet stubborn resistance. On 22 February after a barrage of 122 mm rockets the PAVN counterattacked the Vietnamese Marines, who pushed them back with the support of the Hac Bao Company. 23 February saw little progress, prompting a frustrated Abrams to suggest that the Vietnamese Marine Corps should be dissolved. On the night of 23 February the PAVN attempted another counterattack, but were forced back by artillery fire. The ARVN 3rd Regiment launched a night attack along the southern wall of the Citadel. At 05:00 on 24 February they raised the South Vietnamese flag on the Citadel flag tower and proceeded to secure the southern wall by 10:25. Trưởng then ordered the 2nd Battalion, 3rd Regiment and the Hac Bao Company to recapture the Imperial Palace and this was achieved against minimal resistance by late afternoon. The last pocket of PAVN at the southwest corner of the Citadel was eliminated in an attack by the 4th Vietnamese Marine Battalion in the early hours of 25 February.

== Mopping-up operations ==
On 22 February the ARVN 21st and the 39th Ranger Battalions boarded junks and traveled to Gia Hoi Island (16.476°N 107.589°E), between the east wall of the Citadel and the Perfume River where the Communist provisional government had been headquartered since the start of the offensive. The Rangers swept the island as thousands of local residents came out of hiding and ran through their ranks to escape the battle. The toughest fight of the day centered on a pagoda that contained a PAVN battalion headquarters. The sweep continued until 25 February. The three-day operation netted hundreds of VC cadre, many of whom were university students who, according to local residents, had played a key role in rounding up government officials and intellectuals the PAVN/VC regarded as threats to their new regime.

On 23 February a company from the 5/7th Cavalry, boarded helicopters and flew to the docks near Mang Ca, where it joined a platoon of armored personnel carriers from Troop A, 3rd Squadron, 5th Cavalry Regiment, on loan from the 9th Infantry Division which had just arrived in the Phu Bai–Huế region after redeploying from Long Khánh Province to northern I Corps by sea. The mechanized task force swept along the northwestern wall toward the An Hoa Bridge, flushing out a number of PAVN soldiers who had taken refuge in the grasses and weeds. Meanwhile, two kilometers to the northwest, the remainder of the 5/7th Cavalry, resumed its advance toward Thon An. The cavalrymen fought their way into the PAVN-occupied hamlet and found beneath its shattered remains a honeycomb of tunnels and bunkers and spent the rest of the day searching the ruins for survivors and combing through the adjacent cemetery, where the 806th Battalion had ambushed the ARVN 7th Airborne Battalion on 31 January. On 24 February, the 5/7th Cavalry, rejoined its detached company and the armored cavalry platoon from the 3/5th Cavalry, near the western corner of the Citadel. The combined force then swept toward the Bach Ho Railroad Bridge along the southwestern face of the Citadel, where a few PAVN still held out in a narrow band of trees between the moat and the wall.

While 1/1 Marines conducted mopping-up operations in southern Huế, 2/5 Marines had been conducting patrols south of the Phu Cam Canal. On 24 February 2/5 Marines launched an operation to the southwest of Huế to relieve the ARVN 101st Engineering Company compound which had been under siege by the PAVN since the start of the battle. As the Marines approached the base at 07:00 they were met by PAVN mortar and machine-gun fire; artillery fire was called in on the PAVN positions and the Marines entered the base at 08:50. The base remained under fire from PAVN positions in a Buddhist temple to the south and from a ridgeline to the west and at 07:00 on 25 February Companies F and G began to attack the ridgeline, but were met by intense mortar fire. Under cover of supporting fire the Marines secured part of the ridgeline, killing three PAVN for the loss of one Marine killed. The attack resumed the following morning and the ridge was secured with 20 PAVN and two Marines killed. Company H attacked a nearby hill meeting a stubborn defense, losing one dead and killing six PAVN. Company H withdrew so that air strikes could be launched and these knocked out mortar and machine gun positions killing 20 PAVN; however, one bomb fell short killing four Marines. On 27 February the entire battalion attacked the hill but the PAVN had withdrawn during the night, leaving behind 14 dead.

On 28 February 1/5 Marines and 2/5 Marines launched an operation to the east of Huế to try to cut off any PAVN forces moving from Huế towards the coast. While the Marines encountered few PAVN in their sweeps they located various abandoned infrastructure that had been used to support the battle, including a 3 km trench system with over 600 fighting holes. On 2 March 1968 the Marines concluded Operation Huế City.

== Casualties ==
The fighting in other parts of South Vietnam during Tet was generally confined to a week or sometimes less; the battle for Huế was the longest, lasting from 31 January through 2 March 1968. Over 10,000 soldiers and civilians died in the fighting, making the battle the bloodiest of the Vietnam War.

ARVN losses were 458 killed and an estimated 2,700 wounded.

Using updated figures, Mark Bowden puts US casualties in Battle of Hue at 250 killed and 1,554 wounded. The US Marines lost 142 killed and 1,100 injured, while the 2/12 Air Cavalry lost 81 killed and 251 wounded. The 5/7 Air Cavalry lost 27 killed and 203 wounded. According to Max Hastings, the US Marines and US Army lost 216 killed and 1,584 wounded in the battle for Hue.

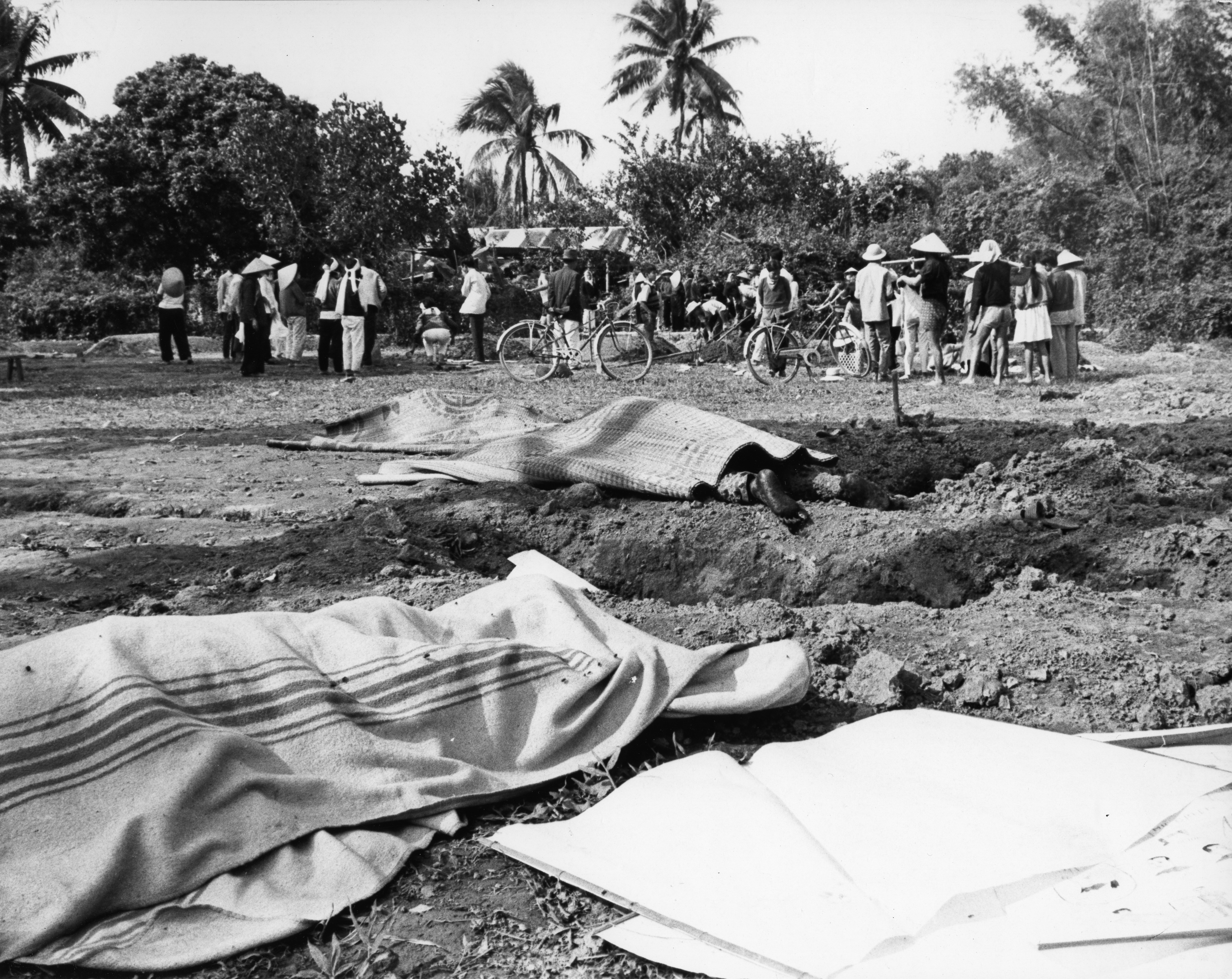
The bodies of those killed in the Hue Massacre exhumed in June, 1968.

PAVN-VC losses are disputed. The PAVN's Department of Warfare gives figures of 2,400 killed and 3,000 wounded from 30 January until 28 March. A PAVN document captured by the ARVN stated that 1,042 troops had been killed in the city proper, and that several times that number had been wounded. MACV claimed figures of 5,133 PAVN-VC killed at Huế.

Bowden estimates that over 8,000 civilians died during the battle. James Willbanks writes that 5,800 civilians were reported killed or missing. Between 300 and 6,000 civilians and captured ARVN POWs were executed by PAVN-VC cadres during the Hue Massacre. (Note: The low range figure of 300 is the official estimate of the Socialist Republic of Vietnam. The figure of 4,856 was provided by ARVN. Mark Bowden writes that both these figures are distorted from propaganda from each respective side.) Douglas Pike's rigorous study of the mass burial sites around the city produced an estimate of 2,800 victims from the Hue Massacre, a figure which Mark Bowden believes to be close to the true number. Between 200 and 2,000 civilians were killed in ARVN reprisals and summary executions after the battle's conclusion.

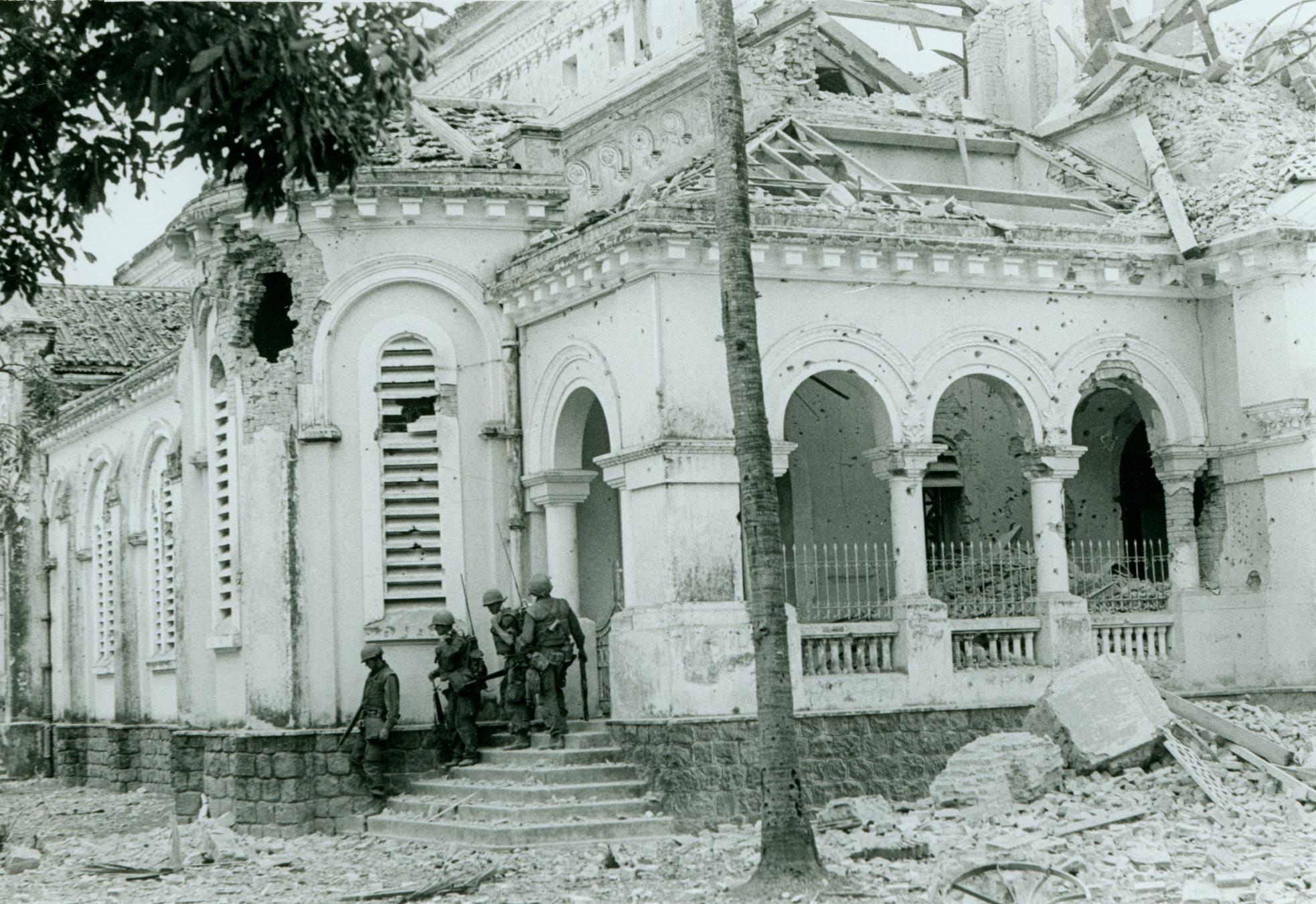
U.S. Marines emerge from the battle-damaged Jeanne d'Arc church in southern Huế.

In addition to the significant civilian casualties inflicted in the battle, eighty percent of the city was destroyed and 116,000 civilians out of the pre-battle population of 140,000 were rendered homeless.

== Huế under Communist control ==
The PAVN-VC were generally greeted with little enthusiasm by the population of Huế. Power and water supply into the city had been cut off, and people were aware that the ARVN and U.S. forces would soon counterattack. While a few joined the PAVN-VC and others supported them by digging fortifications and preparing food, most of the population either tried to flee behind the ARVN-U.S. lines or took shelter in their homes or in churches and pagodas, which they hoped would be safe.

The PAVN set up provisional authorities shortly after capturing Huế, charged with removing the existing Republic of Vietnam administration from power within the city and replacing it with a "revolutionary administration". Working from lists of "cruel tyrants and reactionary elements" previously developed by VC intelligence officers, many people were to be rounded up during the initial hours of the attack. These included ARVN soldiers, civil servants, political party members, local religious leaders, schoolteachers, American civilians and other expatriates. Cadres called out the names on their lists over loudspeakers, ordering them to report to a local school. Those not reporting voluntarily were hunted down.

The PAVN-VC's actions were based on a series of orders issued by the PAVN High Command and the Provisional Revolutionary Government of the Republic of South Vietnam (PRG). In a 3500-page document issued on 26 January 1968 by the Trị-Thiên-Huế Political Directorate, the political cadres were given specific instructions: Operating in close support of the regular military and guerrilla elements, the political cadre were to: destroy and disorganize the Republic of Vietnam's administrative machinery "from province and district levels to the city wards, streets, and wharves; motivate the people of Huế to take up arms, pursue the enemy, seize power, and establish a revolutionary government; motivate (recruit) local citizens for military and "security" forces ... transportation and supply activities, and to serve wounded soldiers... pursue to the end (and) punish spies, reactionaries, and tyrants and maintain order and security in the city."

Those identified by the PAVN-VC were initially marched out of the city for "reeducation". Few returned. Those deemed guilty of the most serious "crimes" were speedily tried and executed. As the PAVN-VC area of control within Huế shrank, the pace of executions increased to prevent the "enemies of the people" being freed by ARVN or U.S. forces or identifying the VC who had revealed themselves. Mark Bowden suggests that PAVN-VC anger at the lack of enthusiasm among the population of Huế may have fuelled the purges, particularly as defeat loomed closer. Estimates of Vietnamese civilians killed by the PAVN-VC at Huế range from 2,800 (based on bodies exhumed from mass graves) to almost 6,000. Bowden conservatively estimates that 2,000 people were executed. In addition, the PAVN and Viet Cong forces demolished much of Huế’s temples, palaces and monuments during their occupation of city.

Foreign civilians captured in the city received varying treatment. Some were marched north into captivity, while others were executed, including three West German doctors, two French Benedictine monks and two U.S. government employees. French journalists Catherine Leroy and Francois Mazure were captured by the PAVN, but were allowed to return to U.S. lines bringing photos of the PAVN side of the battle which were subsequently published in Life Magazine.

== Impact on American public opinion ==
The initial press statements by MACV played down the events in Huế, claiming that only a part of the city had fallen to a small enemy force, that the city would soon be fully restored to South Vietnamese Government control and that the main attack would be directed against Khe Sanh. This and subsequent optimistic reports were soon contradicted by press reports as journalists made their way into the city and reported on the extent of PAVN-VC control and the bitter house-to-house fighting that was underway.

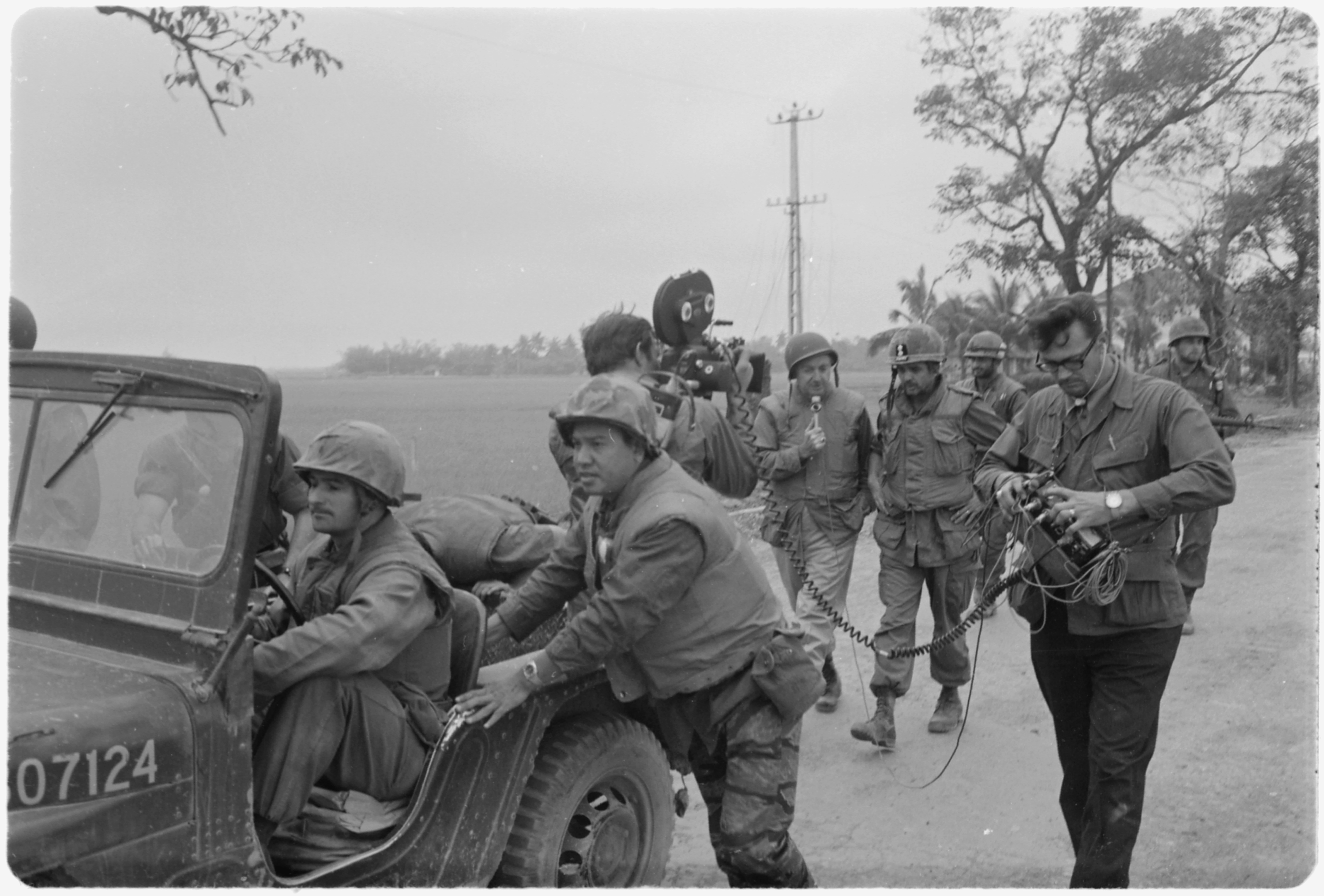
Walter Cronkite (holding microphone) interviews Lt. Col. Gravel outside Huế, February 1968.

On 10 February 1968, CBS News anchorman Walter Cronkite visited southern Huế to film footage for a special report on the Vietnam War. The "Report from Vietnam: Who, What, When, Where, Why?" screened on 27 February 1968, Cronkite closed the report with the editorial comments:

We have been too often disappointed by the optimism of the American leaders, both in Vietnam and Washington, to have faith any longer in the silver linings they find in the darkest clouds. They may be right, that Hanoi's winter-spring offensive has been forced by the Communist realization that they could not win the longer war of attrition, and that the Communists hope that any success in the offensive will improve their position for eventual negotiations... For it seems now more certain than ever that the bloody experience of Vietnam is to end in a stalemate. This summer's almost certain standoff will either end in real give-and-take negotiations or terrible escalation; and for every means we have to escalate, the enemy can match us, and that applies to invasion of the North, the use of nuclear weapons, or the mere commitment of one hundred, or two hundred, or three hundred thousand more American troops to the battle... To say that we are closer to victory today is to believe, in the face of the evidence, the optimists who have been wrong in the past. To suggest we are on the edge of defeat is to yield to unreasonable pessimism. To say that we are mired in stalemate seems the only realistic, yet unsatisfactory, conclusion. On the off chance that military and political analysts are right, in the next few months we must test the enemy's intentions, in case this is indeed his last big gasp before negotiations. But it is increasingly clear to this reporter that the only rational way out then will be to negotiate, not as victors, but as an honorable people who lived up to their pledge to defend democracy, and did the best they could.

After watching Cronkite's editorial report, President Lyndon Johnson is purported to have said, "If I've lost Cronkite, I've lost Middle America." This account has been questioned in a book on journalistic accuracy.

Militarily, Huế and the entire Tet Offensive were Allied victories. However, the shock of the Tet Offensive, coming so soon after General William Westmoreland's "End in view" tour of the U.S. in November 1967, undermined the credibility of Westmoreland and his strategy within the Johnson Administration. Over the coming months U.S. public opinion turned decisively against the war.

== Analysis ==
Throughout the entire battle, the U.S. command consistently underestimated the size of the PAVN-VC forces engaged and the Allied forces necessary to deal with them. Initially forces were identified as coming from the PAVN 4th, 5th and 6th Regiments. Additional battalions were later identified as coming from the 29th Regiment of the 325C Division, the 90th and 803rd Regiments of the 324B Division and the 24th Regiment of the 304th Division. Three of these regiments were believed to be involved in the siege of Khe Sanh. Allied intelligence estimated that 16–18 PAVN battalions, totaling 8–11,000 soldiers, were engaged in the battle. Allied air and artillery support was restricted by the poor weather, supply difficulties and, initially, by restrictions intended to limit damage to Huế's historic structures.

While PAVN-VC defeat was inevitable in the face of U.S. firepower, the failure to sever the PAVN-VC supply lines and isolate the battlefield meant that the battle lasted longer and was more costly to the ARVN and U.S. than was necessary. Until the last week of the battle, the ARVN, U.S. Marines and 1st Cavalry each fought separate, largely uncoordinated battles without a unified command structure, no overall strategy and competing demands for logistics, air and artillery support. Delaying the counterattack until a clear strategy was developed and the necessary forces assembled might have reduced casualties among the ARVN, U.S. forces and civilians and shortened the battle.

The battle was an ARVN-U.S. victory in only the narrowest sense in that they had evicted the PAVN-VC from the city at heavy cost, but failed to annihilate them. The PAVN-VC failed to hold the city or spark a general uprising, but they had undermined confidence in the Thiệu-Kỳ government and the prospect of victory. Unplanned by the North Vietnamese, their greatest success was the shock and negative impact of the battle and the entire Tet Offensive on U.S. public opinion.

PAVN General Trần Văn Trà later wrote of the Tet Offensive, "We did not correctly evaluate the specific balance of forces between ourselves and the enemy... [its objectives] were beyond our actual strength...in part an illusion based on our subjective desires."

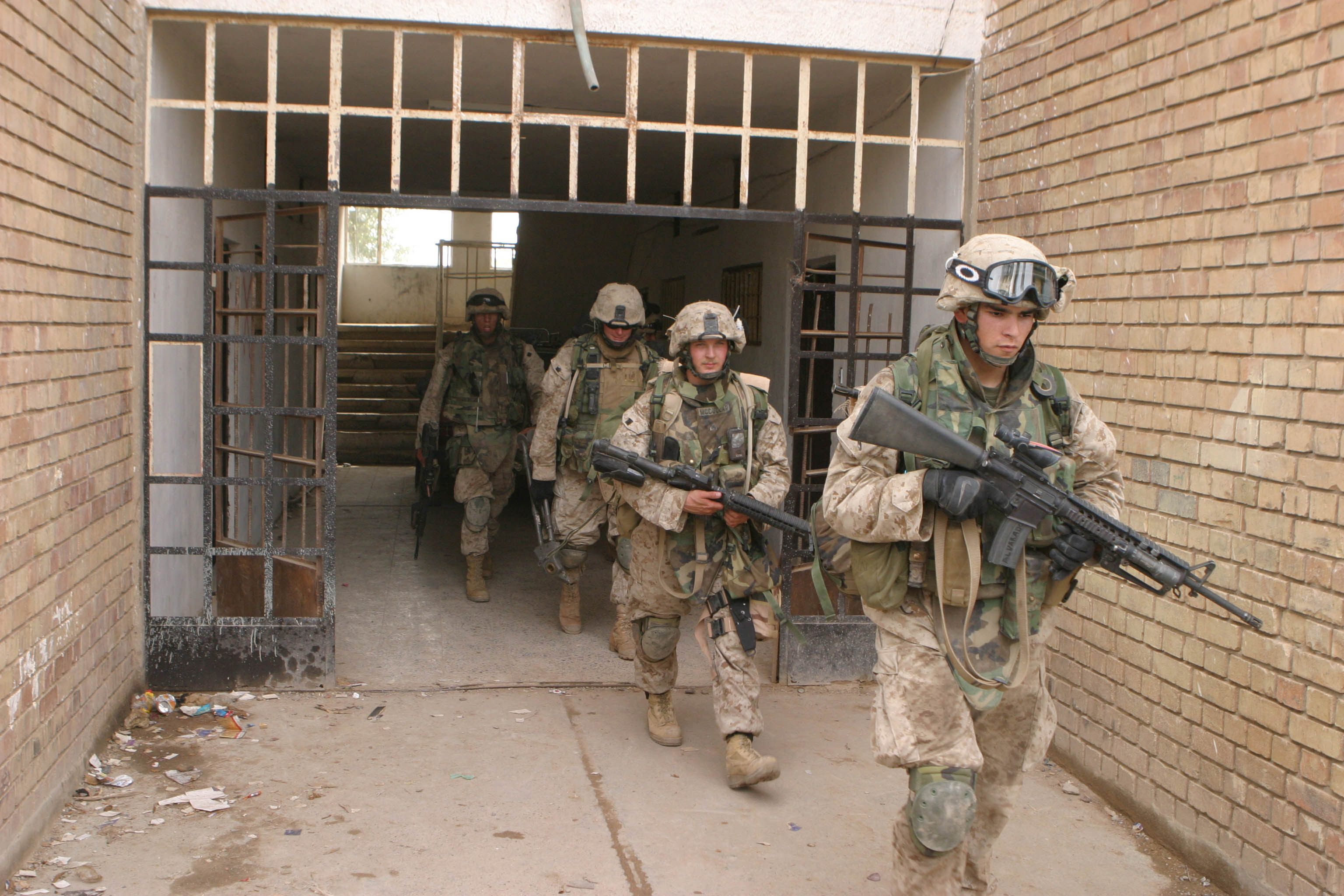
3rd Battalion 5th Marines seize apartments at the edge of Fallujah in November 2004.

The November 2004 anti-insurgent Marine operation in the city of Fallujah, which took place during the Iraq War, has been compared to the Battle of Huế. Both battles were fought in close quarters in an urban setting where the enemy ensconced itself in the midst of civilians. In Fallujah, Sunni insurgents turned mosques into fortresses, in a similar way to how PAVN-VC forces utilized Buddhist temples in Huế. Both battles also had insurgents and other forces utilizing snipers, significantly increasing the combat potential of the combatants, while the Marines also constituted the advanced fighting elements of the US forces deployed in both Huế and Fallujah. In his analysis of the Battle of Fallujah, Jonathan F. Keiler, a military historian and former officer in the Judge Advocate General's Corps wrote:

The Marine Corps' military operations in urban terrain doctrine recognizes that tactical success does not necessarily translate to strategic victory... the Battle of Huế in the Vietnam War, when Marines defeated an enemy that sought to put up a good fight but never expected to win. Much the same can be said of Fallujah's defenders. In spite of the beating they took in November, they will continue to assert they repelled the initial attack and fought well thereafter.

== Memorials ==
The U.S. Navy Ticonderoga class-guided-missile cruiser USS Hué City, commissioned in 1991, is named after the battle. To date it is the only U.S. Navy ship named after a battle of the Vietnam War.
