= Stanley S. Hughes =

United States Marine Corps colonel and double Navy Cross recipient

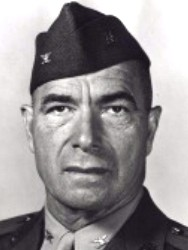
- Born: 29 October 1918
- Military career
- Allegiance: United States
- Branch: United States Marine Corps
- Service years: 1940–1970
- Rank: Colonel
- Commands: 1st Marine Regiment
- Conflicts: World War II; Vietnam War; Battle of Hue
- Awards: Navy Cross (2); Silver Star; Legion of Merit

Stanley Smith Hughes (born 29 October 1918) was a United States Marine Corps officer during World War II and the Vietnam War.

== Service ==
Hughes served as an enlisted man, but by 1944 he was recorded as a lieutenant. During the Vietnam War, he served as the commander of the 1st Marines Regiment during the Battle of Hue with the rank of colonel.

== Awards ==
Hughes was rewarded the Navy Cross twice, in addition to the Silver Star and the Legion of Merit:

- Navy Cross: February 3, 1968 in the Vietnam War and January 4, 1944 in World War II
- Silver Star: September 16, 1944 in World War II
- Legion of Merit: June 8, 1967 – June 22, 1968 in the Vietnam War
