= Cho Ray Hospital =

Geography
- Location: 201B Nguyễn Chí Thanh Street, Chợ Lớn, Ho Chi Minh City, Southeast, Vietnam
- Coordinates: 10.7572°N 106.6598°E

Services
- Beds: 2000

History
- Former names: Hôpital municipal de Cholon (Late 1900-1919); Hôpital Indigène de Cochinchine (1919-1938); Hôpital Lalung-Bonnaire (1938-1945); Hôpital 415 (1945-1957)
- Founded: 1900

Links
- Website: bvchoray.vn
- Lists: Hospitals in Vietnam

Chợ Rẫy Hospital is the largest general hospital in Ho Chi Minh City and the Southern region, Vietnam; and is also one of the three high specialized hospital in Vietnam along with Bạch Mai Hospital in Hanoi, Northern Vietnam and Huế Central Hospital in Huế, Central Vietnam. It was founded in 1900 during the French colonial rule as Hôpital Municipal de Cholon. Over the years, the hospital has also been known as Hôpital Indigène de Cochinchine (1919), Hôpital Lalung-Bonnaire (1938), and Hôpital 415 (1945), until it was ultimately renamed Chợ Rẫy in 1957.

The facility was reconstructed on the area of 53,000 m^{2} and was re-equipped to become one of the largest hospitals in Southeast Asia in June 1974 with the help of the Japanese government.

== History ==
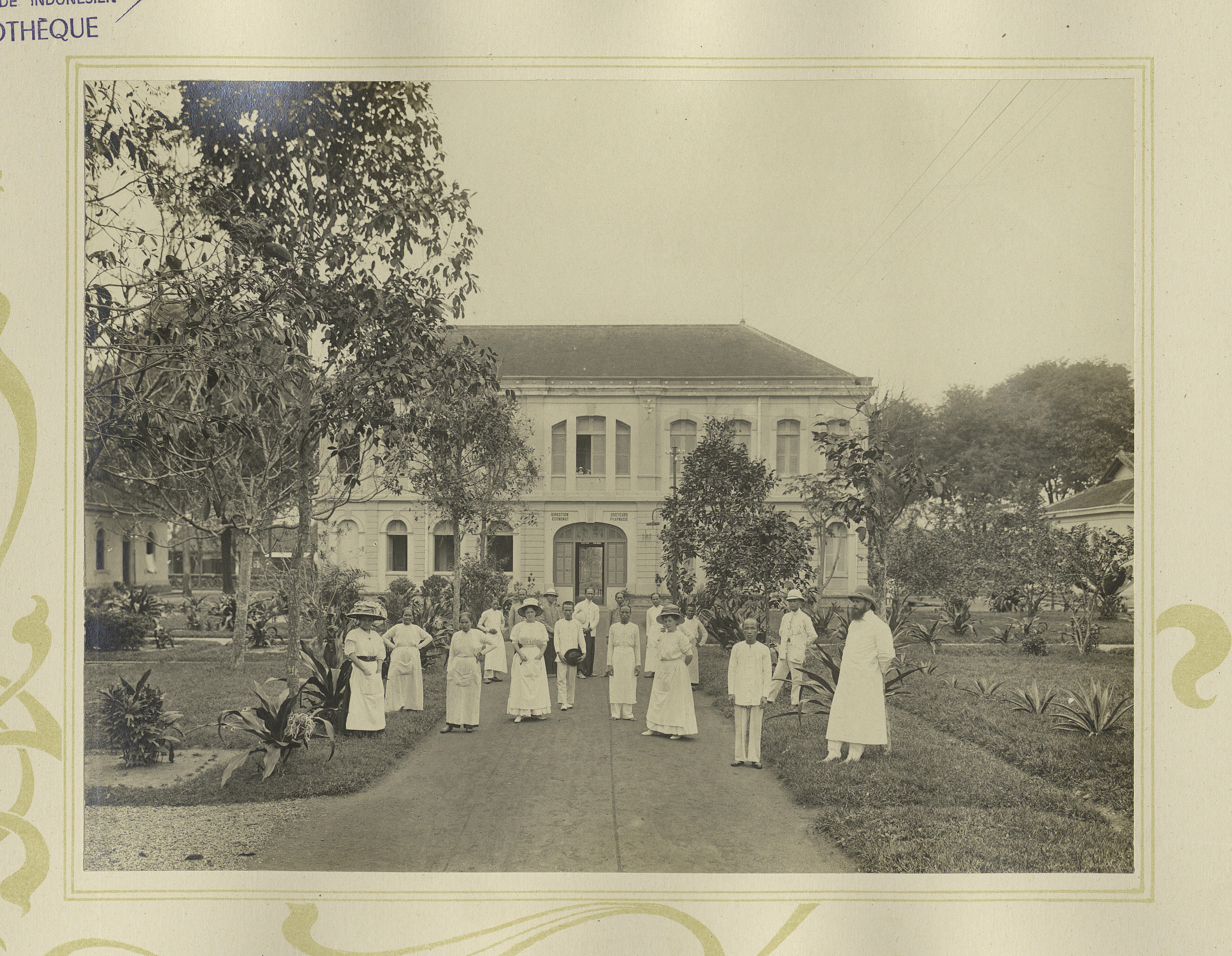
Chợ Lớn Municipal Hospital in 1909

The hospital was established in the late 19th century, initially named Hôpital municipal de Cholon (Chợ Lớn Municipal Hospital; Bệnh viện Thị xã Chợ Lớn). In 1919, it was renamed Hôpital indigène de Cochinchine (Indigenous Cochinchina Hospital; Bệnh viện Bản xứ Nam Kỳ), and in 1938, it was again renamed Hôpital Lalung-Bonnaire (named after Paul Marie Philomène Victor Lalung-Bonnaire, a French physician, and microbiologist born in 1878). The hospital had up to 647 beds, making it the largest general hospital by bed count at the time.

In 1957, under the Republic of Vietnam, after merging the Hàm Nghi and Nam Việt clinics, the hospital was renamed Chợ Rẫy Hospital. By 1971, Chợ Rẫy Hospital had 17 departments: external consultations, internal medicine, dentistry, oncology, neurology, cardiology, surgery, anatomy, orthopedics, plastic and reconstructive surgery, neurosurgery, ENT, ophthalmology, radiotherapy, radiology, laboratory, and blood bank and medical supplies. From 1971 to 1974, the hospital was rebuilt on an area of 53,000 m² with modern equipment, funded by the Japanese government.

After 1975, the hospital was taken over by the new government and placed under the Ministry of Health, where it remains today. In 1993, Chợ Rẫy Hospital received further assistance from Japan for infrastructure reconstruction, and in the years that followed, continued to receive support from Japan in terms of training, equipment, and medical techniques.

== Organization ==
Cho Ray Hospital is a teaching hospital for the University of Medicine and Pharmacy at Ho Chi Minh City (UMP), where medical students and residents were trained under UMP faculty and Cho Ray Hospital staff.

At present, the hospital has 35 clinical, 11 subclinical and 8 functional departments. It organizes practice and postgraduate training for more than 2,500 medical students and 600 doctors each year. Chợ Rẫy Hospital has 2000 beds, employs 2,270 health workers including 500 medical doctors and pharmacists, and provides treatment for about 457,000 outpatients and 67,000 inpatients per year.

With its expertise in areas such as organ transplantation, digestive oncology, urologic oncology, nephrology and internal medicine, the hospital occupies a leading position in Vietnam. The hospital has been honoured with eight individual and collective records in the field of medicine and organ transplants in Vietnam. Especially, Cho Ray’s Department of Urology was awarded with the record of "the unit performs the most kidney transplants in Vietnam". Furthermore, Department of Urology has performed the country's first robot-assisted living donor nephrectomy and the country's first ABO-incompatible kidney transplantation in Vietnam.

The International Society of Nephrology has designated Cho Ray Hospital as one of three accredited regional training centers in Southeast Asia. After many years of partnership with Westmead Hospital, Royal Prince Alfred Hospital (Australia) and Asan Medical Center (South Korea), Cho Ray Hospital has become a center of excellence, developing cross-regional training programs.

== See also ==
- List of hospitals in Vietnam
