= Huế Central Hospital =

Hospital in Vietnam

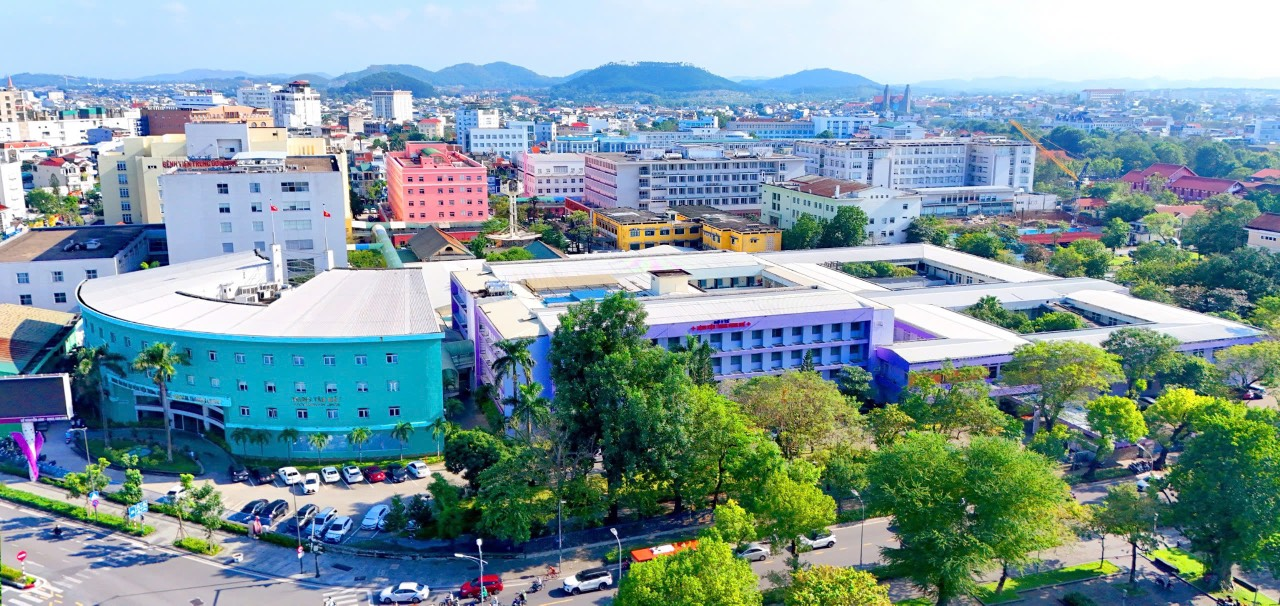
- Huế Central Hospital in 2025

Geography
- Location: 16 Lê Lợi Street, Thuận Hóa, Huế, Central, Vietnam
- Coordinates: 16°27′45″N 107°35′10″E

Organisation
- Type: General

Services
- Beds: 3,939

History
- Former names: Western Medicine Hospital (Bệnh viện Tây Y; before 1944)
- Opened: 1894

Links
- Website: bvtwhue.com.vn/Home/Index/?lang=eng
- Lists: Hospitals in Vietnam

Huế Central Hospital (HCH; Vietnamese: Bệnh viện Trung ương Huế), established in 1894, has been the first Western medicine hospital in Vietnam.

The hospitals, providing 3939 beds and occupying 190,000 square meters (included Branch 2), is one of the three most major hospital in the country along with Bạch Mai Hospital in Hanoi and Chợ Rẫy Hospital in Ho Chi Minh City, and is managed by the Ministry of Health. HCH, positioned as is a top referral hospital, is a central medical institution for the 25 million Coastal and Highlands in Central Vietnam population. It is also the primary training facility for the Huế University of Medicine and Pharmacy.

== Organization ==
Huế Central Hospital employs more than 3000 persons, including nearly 1000 doctors, pharmacists, engineers and high level technicians (40 professors and PhDs, 100 2nd level specialists, 300 masters and 1st level specialists). They are supplemented by more than 150 staff and 2,500 students of the Hue Medical College and around 300 doctors and interns continuing their professional development at the hospital. HCH is organized into more than 100 clinics and para-clinic departments, 8 centers, notably the Cardiovascular Center, Blood Transfusion Center, Training Center, Pediatric Center, Traumatology and Orthopedic Center, International Medical Center, Oncology Center, Odonto-Stomatology Center, and the hospital Branch 2 (in Phong Thái, part of former Phong Điền town, 25 km from the north of Central Huế).

== Achievement ==
Annually it provides about 700,000 of consultations, more than 140,000 in-patients and 37,000 surgeries (2018), with an above-norm occupancy rate always more than 100%, and provided care for 8000 births. Patients from minority groups and the poor can be fully or partially exempted from medical fees. HCH administers nine national health programs in the Central Vietnam and itself receives financial and professional assistance from foreign countries like Japan and non-governmental charities.

HCH has been the site of Central Vietnam's first open heart surgery, performed by HCH team in 1999. Today, more than 1000 open heart surgeries are performed per year.

On 2 March 2011, the first heart transplantation was performed in Vietnam. Now heart transplantations are common and completely done by Hue Central Hospital team.

Annually it performed about 150–200 kidney transplantations, 3500–4000 stentings for coronaries diseases, 3000 laparoscopies for GI diseases, 1500 radiotherapy patients (linac Eleckta) for cancers, pediatric radiation (1st in Vietnam), stem cells for breast and ovary cancers, NOTES and TaTME for colorectal cancers, ERCP-SE, ESD-EMR for GI early cancers; 3D, 4K laparoscopic surgery systems; IVF (In Vitro Fertilization) 200–300 cases per year, and many other high techniques.

Current expansion projects include constructions such as: Gyneco-obstetric center, International Medical Center (stage 2), wastewater project for 3500 patient beds (base 1 and international hospital), the complete 2nd stage of the Oncology Center with PET-Cyclotron project, Orthopedic and traumatic center.
