= Full metal =

Full metal, full-metal, or fullmetal may refer to:

- Full metal jacket (ammunition)

== Arts, entertainment, and media ==
=== Anime and manga ===
- Fullmetal Alchemist, a manga and anime series
- Full Metal Panic!, a manga and anime series

=== Film ===
- Full Metal Jacket, a 1987 British-American film
- Full Metal Ninja, a 1989 Hong Kong film
- Full Metal Yakuza, a 1997 Japanese film
- Full Metal Village, a 2007 German film

=== Professional wrestling ===
- Full Metal Mayhem match, a type of professional wrestling match
- WWF Full Metal: The Album, a 1995 album by the World Wrestling Federation

=== Television ===
- Full Metal Challenge, a British television series
- Full Metal Jousting, an American television show

=== Video games ===
- Full Metal Daemon: Muramasa, a 2009 visual novel
- Full Metal Furies, a 2018 video game
- Mad Stalker: Full Metal Forth, a 1994 video game
- Cyberbots: Full Metal Madness, a 1995 video game

=== Other uses in arts, entertainment, and media ===
- Full Metal Jacket Diary, a 2005 book by Matthew Modine
- Full Metal Jackie, an American radio program
