= Phu Bai Combat Base =

Former U.S. military base in Vietnam

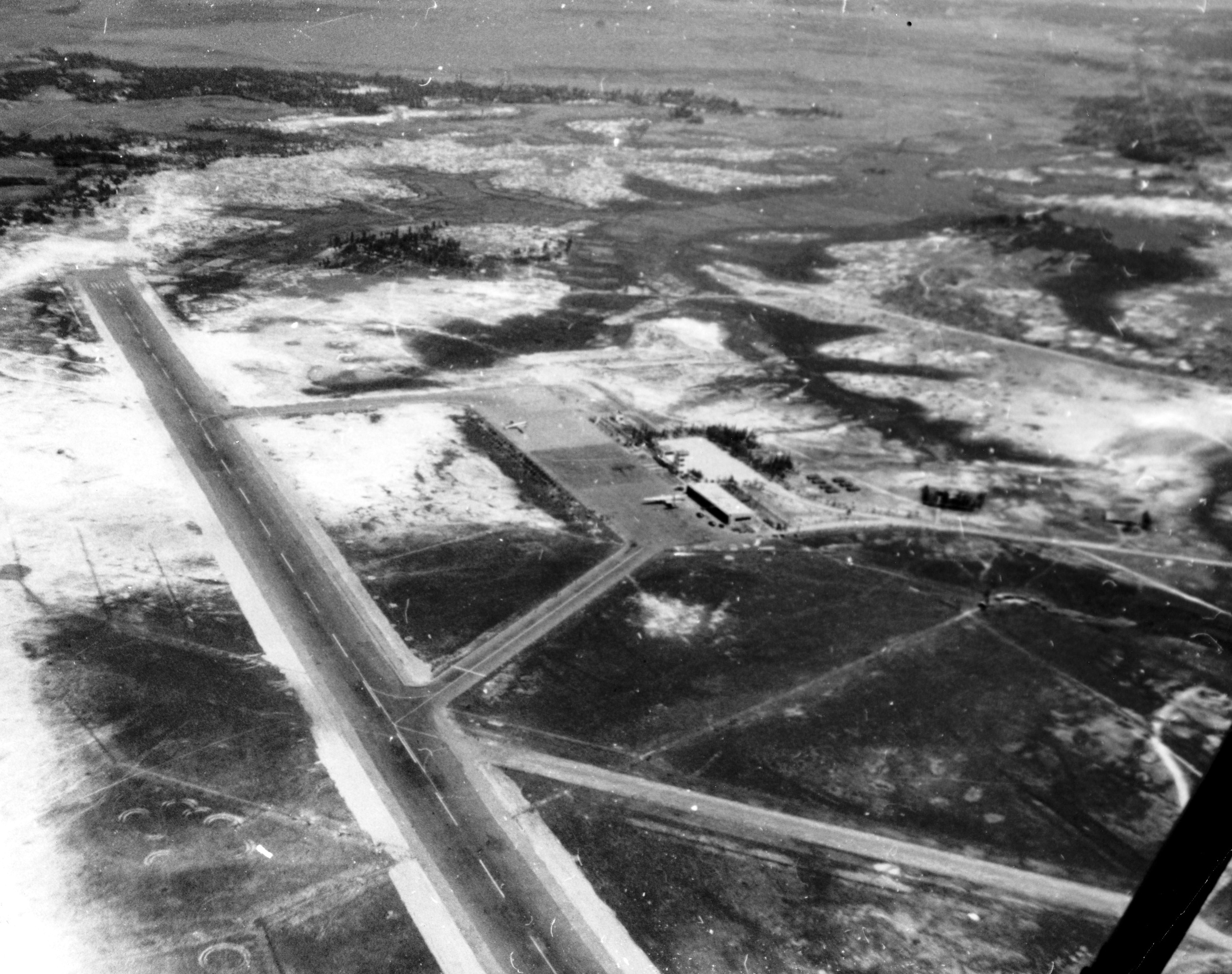
- Phu Bai airfield, April 1965

Site information
- Type: Army/Marine Base
- Condition: Seized 1975 by PAVN, now civil airport

Location
- Coordinates: 16°24′06″N 107°42′10″E

Site history
- Built: 1963
- In use: 1963–1975
- Battles/wars: Vietnam War

Airfield information
- IATA: none; ICAO: none

Summary
- Elevation AMSL: 49 ft (15 m)
- Interactive map of Airfield information

Runways
Direction	Length		Surface
Direction	ft	m	Surface
09/27	8,775	2,675	Asphalt

Phu Bai Combat Base (also known as Phu Bai Airfield and Camp Hochmuth) is a former U.S. Army and U.S. Marine Corps base south of Huế, in central Vietnam.

== History ==
=== 1962–1965 ===
The Army Security Agency, operating under cover of the 3rd Radio Research Unit (3rd RRU), established a radio facility at Phu Bai in 1963, 12 km southeast of Huế on Highway 1. The operational unit was later redesignated as the 8th Radio Research Field Station (8th RRFS).

As one of the Army Security Agency's most important intelligence facilities in Southeast Asia, the station played a vital role in supporting military operations throughout the conflict.

The station's primary mission was the interception and analysis of enemy radio communications. Personnel assigned to the station collected electronic intelligence from North Vietnamese Army and Viet Cong networks and transformed that information into actionable intelligence for American and allied commanders.

The installation became widely known for its AN/FLR-9 Wullenweber antenna array. This large circular structure dominated the landscape and earned the nickname "The Elephant Cage" because of its distinctive appearance when viewed from the air.

The station maintained close operational relationships with the National Security Agency and other elements of the United States intelligence community. Through these partnerships the 8th RRFS contributed to a broader intelligence network that supported military planning and battlefield decision-making.

=== 1965–1967 ===
On 10 April 1965 Task Force Alpha of 2nd Battalion, 3rd Marines was landed by helicopter from Da Nang Air Base to secure the area. On 13 April a detachment of ten UH-34D helicopters from HMM-162 was established at Phu Bai. On 14 April Battalion Landing Team 3rd Battalion, 4th Marines replaced Task Force Alpha at Phu Bai.

In late 1965, The 3rd Marine Division established its headquarters at Phu Bai and would remain there until late 1967, when it was moved forward to Đông Hà.

On 30 August 1967 a People's Army of Vietnam mortar attack on the base damaged 13 helicopters, killing two Seabees and wounding 32 Marines and Seabees.

In late November 1967, the base was named Camp Hochmuth in honor of Bruno Hochmuth, Commanding General, 3rd Marine Division, who was killed in a helicopter explosion north of Huế.

In June or July 1968, U.S. Special Forces established Forward Operating Base 1 (FOB 1) at Phu Bai. The base remained in use until early 1969. The 85th Evacuation Hospital provided medical support for the region and was located on the base near Route 1.

Marine units based at Phu Bai during this period included:

- 2nd Battalion 1st Marines
- 2nd Battalion 3rd Marines
- 2nd Battalion 4th Marines
- 3rd Battalion 4th Marines
- 4th Battalion 12th Marines
- HMM-161 (May 1965 – January 1966, June–November 1966)
- HMM-163 (January – April 1966, October 1966 – July 1967)
- HMM-164 (July – November 1967)
- HMM-362 (August – November 1967)
- VMO-3 (January 1967–1969)
- Marine Aircraft Group 36 (November 1967 – October 1969)
  - HMM-164 (December 1967 – February 1968, June – November 1968)
  - HMM-165 (December 1967 – January 1968, March 1968)
  - HMM-263 (November 1967)
  - HMM-265 (January – May 1969)
  - HMM-362 (December 1967 – May 1968, October – November 1968)
  - HMM-363 (June–September 1968)
  - HMM-364 (November 1967 – November 1968)
  - HML-367 (December 1967 – October 1969)
  - HMM-462 (August 1968 – October 1969)
- VMO-6 (October–November 1967)
- Marine Air Support Squadron 2(January 1966 - November 1968)

=== 1968 ===
On 30/31 January 1968, the base was hit by Vietcong mortar and rocket fire as part of the Tet Offensive. The base was used to support U.S. and ARVN forces fighting in the Battle of Huế. The first relief force was dispatched from Phu Bai to the MACV Compound in Huế City.

During the Tet Offensive of 1968 the intelligence produced at the 8th RRFS provided valuable insight into enemy activities and intentions. Information gathered by the station supported both United States and Army of the Republic of Vietnam forces during one of the most significant campaigns of the war. The contributions of the 8th RRFS established the facility as a critical component of the American intelligence effort in Vietnam.

On 15 February 1968, General Creighton Abrams established MACV forward at Phu Bai to assume direct control of US forces in northern I Corps, which were then engaged in the Battle of Huế, the Battle of Khe Sanh, and the Tet Counteroffensive.

On 10 March 1968, MACV Forward, having served its purpose, was converted to a Corps headquarters and designated Provisional Corps, Vietnam, under the command of Lieutenant General William B. Rosson. Rosson exercised operational control over the 3rd Marine Division (Reinforced), the 1st Cavalry Division, the 101st Airborne Division (Reinforced) and assigned Corps troops. The new Corps also co-operated closely with the ARVN 1st Division in the area. Provisional Corps, Vietnam, was designated XXIV Corps on 12 August 1968.

The 45th Engineer Group moved north to the Phu Bai area in February 1968, where it assumed general construction support missions for the I Corps Tactical Zone. The group then remained in the Da Nang area until departing Vietnam.

=== 1969–1972 ===
In 1969, the 85th Evacuation Hospital moved from Qui Nhơn and was established at the northwest end of the airfield, adjacent to Highway 1.

In late 1969, the 101st Administration Company (101st Airborne Division) was moved from Bien Hoa Base Camp to Phu Bai.

Units based at Phu Bai during this period included:

- 220th Aviation Company
- HMM-161 (October 1969 – September 1970)

During the Easter Offensive in March 1972, 2nd BN 1st INF REGT 196th LIB was flown from Danang to Phu Bai to provide security for the airfield and the Army Security unit. The 2-1IN/196LIB remained their till the Brigade stood down at the end of July 1972.

On 20 October 1972 the base was handed over to the South Vietnamese.

=== 1973–1975 ===
The ARVN operated Phu Bai as a forward logistics base, and it was the only airport serving Huế.

In September 1974, during the Battle of Phú Lộc, after pushing the ARVN defenders off Mo Tau Mountain, the People's Army of Vietnam (PAVN) targeted artillery fire against the base until they were evicted by the ARVN 1st Division and 15th Ranger Group on 11 December.

=== 1975 ===
From 5 March 1975, the PAVN shelled the base as part of the Hue–Da Nang Campaign. Nonetheless, the base continued to be used for aerial reinforcement of the ARVN, until it was overrun by the PAVN on 23/24 March 1975.

== Current use ==
The airfield is now used as Phu Bai International Airport.

== In popular culture ==
- Gustav Hasford wrote about his experiences in and around Phu Bai in 1968, in his semi-autobiographical novels The Short-Timers (1979) and The Phantom Blooper (1990).
- In the film Full Metal Jacket (1987), based mainly on The Short-Timers and in part on The Phantom Blooper, two combat journalists for Stars and Stripes, Joker and Rafterman, are sent to Phu Bai, where they cover as well as participate in the action there, and in Hue, in January 1968.
