= Pogue =

Military slang

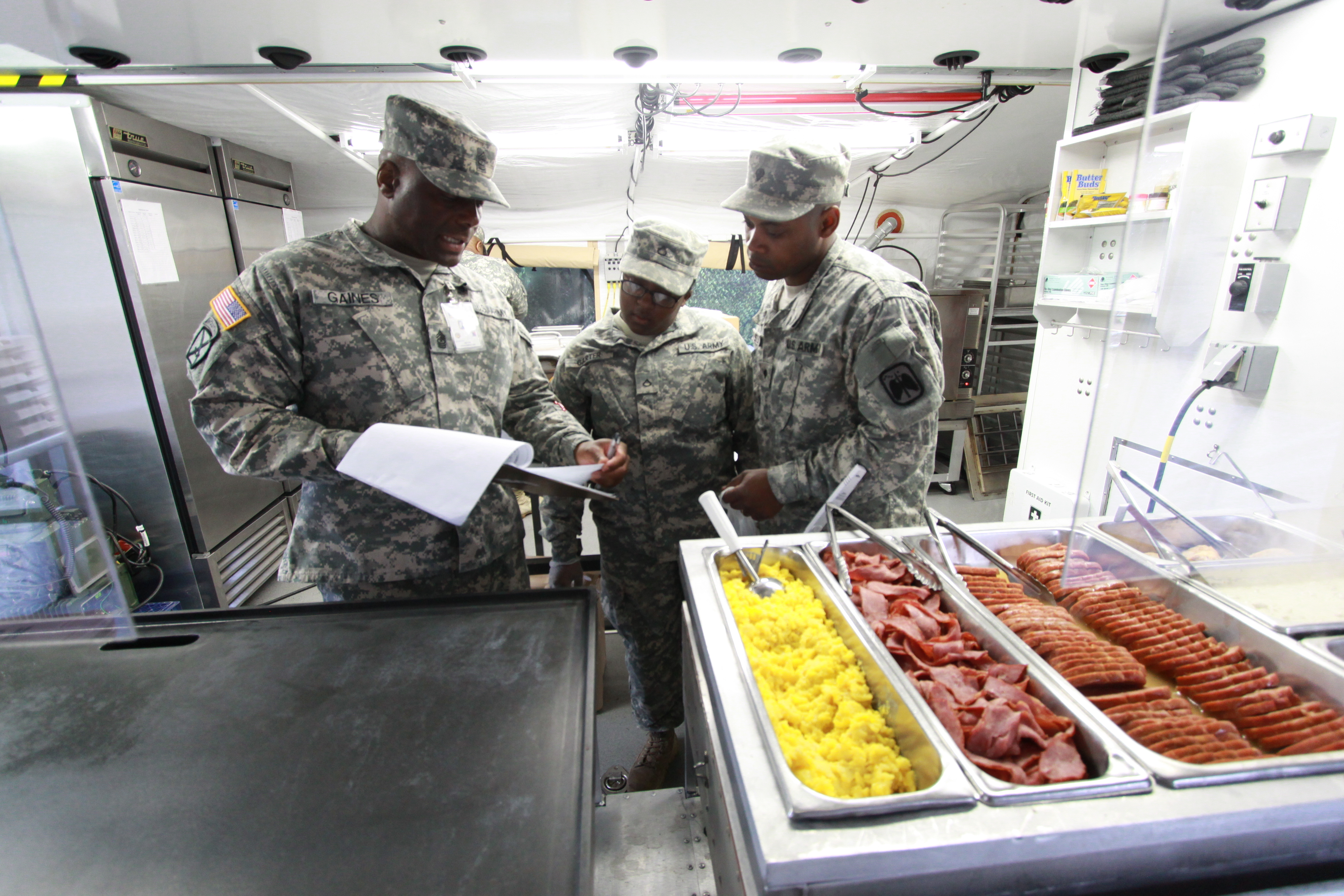
U.S. military support personnel, like these Army culinary specialists, may be referred to by some combat personnel as pogues.

Pogue or POG (/poʊɡ/ POHG) is American pejorative military slang for non-combat or non-infantry personnel.

== History ==
"Pogue" may have entered the American military lexicon during the Civil War through "póg," the Irish language word for "kiss." In this telling, the word "pogue" was popularized by deployed Irish-American sailors who were envious of onshore personnel who still enjoyed the affections of their sweethearts.

By World War I, "pogue" was used by U.S. Marines to refer to a male homosexual. In World War II, its definition shifted to Marines thought to be soft or unfit for duty. By the time of the Vietnam War, "pogue" referred to rear echelon support personnel. Paul Dickson's War Slang humorously defined "pogue" during Operation Desert Storm as "anyone who arrived in the Gulf after you."

In the modern Marine Corps and Army, the oft-used acronym "POG"—standing for "Person Other than Grunt," with "grunt" being slang for an infantryman—may have originated as a backronym for "pogue." Some have argued that "pogue" and "POG" are of disparate origins and meanings. Though the term is usually considered condescending and derisive, opinions vary about its level of offensiveness.

== In media ==
In Gustav Hasford's 1979 semi-autobiographical novel The Short-Timers, he illustrates the Marine infantryman's contempt for pogues: "Sergeant Gerheim is disgusted by the fact that I am to be a combat correspondent and not a grunt. He calls me a poge [sic], an office pinky. He says that shitbirds get all the slack." In Stanley Kubrick's 1987 film Full Metal Jacket, an adaptation of Hasford's novel, Sergeant Joker is chastised for wearing a peace button by a character listed in the credits as "Poge Colonel."

== Related terms ==
A closely related U.S. Army term is "REMF," standing for "Rear Echelon Motherfucker," which gained popularity during the Vietnam War. Another term is "fobbit," a mixture of "forward operating base" and "hobbit," originated during the Iraq War, lampooning support personnel who rarely leave the safety of the "Shire."

== See also ==
- FNG syndrome
