= Full metal jacket =

Full metal jacket or Full Metal Jacket may refer to:

- Full metal jacket (ammunition), a type of ammunition
- Full Metal Jacket, a 1987 British-American film about the Vietnam War, directed by Stanley Kubrick
- Full Metal Jacket (Dragon Ball), a character in the Dragon Ball franchise
- Full Metal Jacket Diary, a 2005 book by Matthew Modine
