= Leatherneck Magazine =

Leatherneck Magazine of the Marines
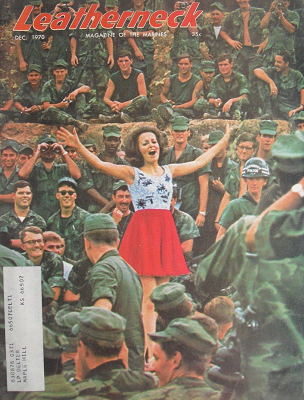
- December 1970 issue with Miss Alabama Ann Fowler in South Vietnam
- Frequency: Monthly
- First issue: 1917; 109 years ago
- Company: Marine Corps Association
- Country: United States
- Language: English
- Website: www.mca-marines.org/magazines/leatherneck/
- ISSN: 0023-981X

Leatherneck Magazine of the Marines (or simply Leatherneck) is a magazine for United States Marines.

== History and profile ==
The first Leatherneck was published Nov. 17, 1917, as a four-page newspaper. It was called The Quantico Leatherneck and cost 2 cents per copy.

The Quantico Leatherneck was started by off-duty US Marines, and in large part by the post printer, Sgt. John C. Smith, in 1917. The link to Editor & Publisher for February 19, 1921, page 38 contains a passionate article giving the details of the beginnings of The Quantico Leatherneck. Included: Captain Jonas Henry Platt, a newspaper man in civilian life, 1st Lt. Angus Alexander Aull at the officers' training school held an honorary position with the paper and is the author of the linked Editor & Publisher article. Corporal William L. Foster, a former reporter for the Cincinnati Post, identified the need for communication among the enlisted ranks. Foster’s forte was collection and composition. Sergeant John C. Smith had a background in journalism with his strength lying in the editorial process according to an article published in the November 2017 Leatherneck authored by Bradley Davis.

After 45 issues, in 1918, Quantico was dropped from the publication's title.

In 1920, with the formation of the Marine Corps Institute (MCI) by Commandant of the Marine Corps John A. Lejeune, Leatherneck became an official Marine Corps publication under the auspices of MCI, and was moved to 8th & I in Washington, D.C. In the 1920s, The Leatherneck transitioned from a weekly newspaper to a semimonthly magazine in June 1925 and became a monthly magazine in June 1926 with a shift from a tabloid-sized newspaper to a 32-page magazine.

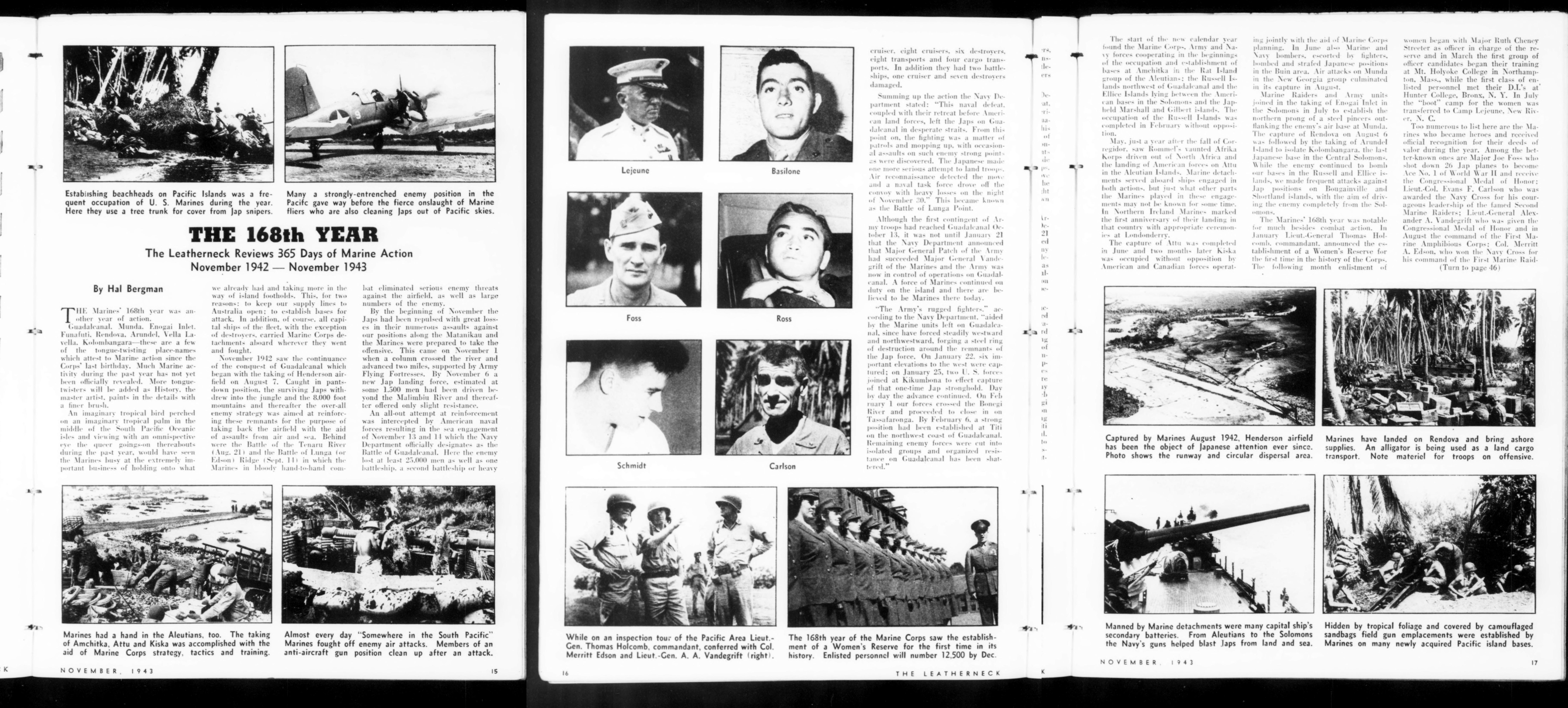
The 168th Year, an article by Hal Bergman published in The Leatherneck, November 1943

During World War II, many of the Marine Corps' combat correspondents were assigned to Leatherneck. Leatherneck acquired a certificate of incorporation in February 1943, the Leatherneck Association was formed to govern the magazine, making it more autonomous and answerable only to the Commandant.

In 1944, an additional Leatherneck office was opened at Camp Catlin, Hawaii, and a semimonthly Pacific Edition of the magazine was launched for Marines overseas. Special Pacific Edition World War II saw Leatherneck expand from a simple publication to a war-driven reminder to Marines everywhere of what was at stake in the fight.

Leatherneck Pacific Edition was published on the 1st and 15th of each month as an advertisement free magazine for overseas Marines. It carried some of the same articles as the standard Leatherneck but there are many articles unique to this edition. The magazine also had in each issue the comics Gizmo and Eightball by Fred Rhoads and Sgt. Hashmark by Fred Lasswell. The magazine’s format was 10″ x 13″ with 40 to 48 pages. Volume 1 issue 1 was published July 1, 1944, Volume 2 Issue 1 was published January 1, 1945, Volume 3 Issue 1 was published July 1, 1945 with the last issue published in Volume 3 Issue 12 on December 15, 1945 after the end of WWII.

In 1948 the name was changed to Leatherneck-Magazine of the Marines.

The magazine's name derives from the slang term "leatherneck" for a U.S. Marine, referring to the leather-lined collar or stock of the original Marine uniform.

Leatherneck was an official Marine Corps publication until 1972, staffed primarily by active-duty Marines. That year all active-duty positions were eliminated and the magazine returned to Quantico. In 1976, the Leatherneck Association merged with the Marine Corps Association (MCA). As of 2016, MCA continues to publish Leatherneck alongside another Marine Corps periodical, the Marine Corps Gazette.

== Mission ==
"To be the magazine of Marines—yesterday, today and tomorrow."

== Leatherneck today ==
Leatherneck is available in magazine form and online.

Col. Mary Reinwald, USMC (Ret) became the first female editor-in-chief in 2014.

As of 2025, the magazine has over 100,000 monthly readers.

== Staff and contributors ==
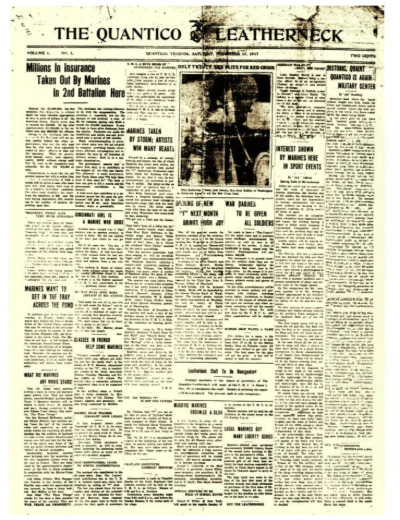
Volume 1 Issue 1 The Quantico Leatherneck November 17, 1917

Leatherneck staff and contributors have included the following:

- Gordon Bess, creator of the comic strip Redeye
- George Booth, cartoonist for The New Yorker
- John Clymer, animal and Western artist
- Gustav Hasford, author of The Short-Timers (the basis for the film Full Metal Jacket) and its sequel The Phantom Blooper
- Russ Jones, illustrator, novelist and founding editor of Creepy magazine
- Fred Lasswell, cartoonist best known for his comic strip Snuffy Smith
- Louis R. Lowery, combat photographer who took the photo of the first flag-raising atop Mount Suribachi, Iwo Jima
- Mike Ploog, comic-book and movie-storyboard artist
- Lawrence Meyer, journalist and author

== List of Leatherneck Magazine Issues ==
The Leatherneck has been published since 1917

No.	Cover	Year	Month	Volume	Issue	Text
1	Volume 1 Issue 1 The Quantico Leatherneck November 17, 1917	1917	November	I	I	First Issue was a 4-page newspaper and cost 2 cents per copy.
2	Leatherneck Magazine Volume 58 Issue 1 January 1975	1975	January	LVIII	1	Designed by Jim Hopewell, our cover includes a reproduction of the historic resolution passed by the Continental Congress on 10 November 1775, authorizing "Two Battalions of Marines." From this resolution evolved the Marine Corps as we know it today. Leatherneck salutes the Corps in its 200th anniversary year.
3		1975	February	LVIII	2	Thirty years ago this month, Sgt Louis Lowery, then a roving photographer for Leatherneck, snapped a quick picture as the American Flag was raised on Iwo Jima. The photograph was memorable in that it was the first taken of the famous flag-raising. Recently, with no one shooting back at him, Lowery set up his camera and took an unhurried photo of the Marine Corps War Memorial in Arlington, Va. He got a better picture this time
-	Leatherneck Magazine March 1975 Volume 58 Issue 3	1975	3	LVIII	3	Marine reservists, most of them from Albuquerque, N.M., recently flew to Alaska for two weeks of cold weather training. Herb Richardson went along to take pictures and write the article, "North To Alaska," which begins on page 14.
4		1975	4	LVIII	4	LCp Matt Biggie is a member of the Marine Security Guard serving in Zaire's capital city of Kinshasa. In the background are the flags of the United African Organiza-tion. Cover photo by Tom Bartlett, whose story on Zaire begins on page 16.
		1975	5	LVIII	5	Marines and equipment get a tough workout at the Landing Force Training Command, Little Creek, Va. Herb Richardson was on hand to shoot the picture when Cpl Ralph Mayone, accompanied by Pfc Steve Vogrin, tested the installation of a deep-water, fording kit on a jeep. The vehicle splashed through the tank perfectly, and the troops dried out eventually. The LFTC article, called "Super Turtles," begins on page 20.
		1975	6	LVIII	6	Marines of Alpha and Delta Companies, 2d Tank Battalion, Camp Lejeune, N. C., recently spent two weeks training at the Army's Fort Pickett, Va. Delta Company was there to learn about the newly adopted M-60 tank, while Alpha Company got in some last-minute firing with its trusty M-48's prior to deployment to Guantanamo Bay, Cuba. Herb Richardson was on hand when one of the M-48's cut loose with its 90-mm. main gun. The story, "Track Training, begins on page 18.
		1975	7	LVIII	7	Archibald Summers, first Sergeant Major of the Marine Corps, was appointed in 1801-'02, although the office, as such, was not officially authorized until 1833. The painting of Summers on this month's cover is by Maj Charles Waterhouse, USMCR. The post was re-created in 1957. Since then, seven Marines have served as Sergeant Major of the Corps. C. L. Kammeier, Leatherneck's Editor-Publisher, salutes them in an article on page 18.
		1975	8	LVIII	8	President Gerald R. Ford was accompanied by Navy Capt Bryan W. Compton, CO of the USS Nimitz, when the world's largest ship was commissioned at Norfolk, Va., recently. The cover was photographed by Tom Bartlett as the ship's Marine Detachment "presented arms" on the hangar deck. The Nimitz story and additional photos of her Marines begin on page 18.
		1975	9	LVIII	9	The Vietnam Service Medal. Leatherneck dedicates this issue to all those who served in Vietnam, to their valor, their devotion, to their love of country. To those who fought and returned... and, to those who made the supreme sacrifice.... Cover photo by Lou Lowery, Leatherneck Photographic Director. The background photo was taken in Vietnam by Sgt Ernie Lebreque.
		1975	10	LVIII	10	The Navy-Marine Team An early beginning 1775 An early toast to the Navy/ Marine Corps team was rendered in 1775 aboard a ship of the Continental Navy. The acrylic painting of the event on our cover is by Maj USMCR. Charles Waterhouse, USMCR. A story about the Navy / Marine Corps Team appears on page 18.
		1975	11	LVIII	11	Heritage of Our Corps The Battle Standard of the Marine Corps, carried by Sgt L.M. Baade, Marine Color Sergeant. This standard proudly bears streamers representing those foreign and U.S. awards earned by Marine Corps units for combat action, as well as those of the campaigns and expeditions in which Marine Corps units have participated from the American Revolution through the war in Vietnam. Cover design: Jim Hopewell. Photo by Lou Lowery.
		1975	12	LVIII	12	Merry Christmas to all from the staff of Leatherneck Cover design: Jim Hopewell.

== List of Pacific Edition of Leatherneck Magazine Issues ==
The Pacific Edition of the Leatherneck was published to distribute the magazine to troops in the field from offices in Hawaii and Guam.

Cover	Volume	Issue	Year	Month	Day	Description
Volume 1 Issue 1 Pacific Edition	1	1	1944	7	1	Cover: Artwork by Sgt. Pat Denman
	1	2	1944	7	15	Cover: Attack and Counter-Attack on Hill 660 – Artwork by Koskinen
	1	3	1944	8	1	Cover: Short Belts – Short Range by artist Koskinen
	1	4	1944	8	15	Cover: Winning Pitcher..Spillane by artist Tom Lovell
	1	5	1944	9	1	Cover: War on Japan’s Doorstep – The Battle for Saipan by artist Sgt. John Clymer
	1	6	1944	9	15	Cover: Air Battle for the Marshalls – Artwork by De Grasse
	1	7	1944	10	1	Cover: Cover Art by artist Sgt Pat Denman
	1	8	1944	10	15	Cover: Gwendolyn the Gooney / Artwork by Anthony
	1	9	1944	11	1	Cover: 169th Anniversary United States Marine Corps – Artwork by Sgt. John Clymer
	1	10	1944	11	15	
	1	11	1944	12	1	
	1	12	1944	12	15	
	2	1	1945	1	1	
	2	2	1945	1	15	
	2	3	1945	2	1	Cover: Artwork by Sgt. John Clymer
	2	4	1945	2	15	Cover: Artwork by De Grasse
	2	5	1945	3	1	Cover: Artwork by Sgt. Fred Lasswell
	2	6	1945	3	15	Cover: Artwork by Fred Lasswell
	2	7	1945	4	1	
	2	8	1945	4	15	Cover: Mt. Suribachi
	2	9	1945	5	1	Cover: Artwork by Fred Lasswell
	2	10	1945	5	15	Cover: Artwork by Sgt. Bill O’Brian
	2	11	1945	6	1	Cover: Artwork by H. Koskinen
	2	12	1945	6	15	Cover: Artwork by Tom Lovell
	3	1	1945	7	1	Cover: Artwork by Fred Lasswell
	3	2	1945	7	15	Cover: Artwork by Sgt. Bill O’Brian.
	3	3	1945	8	1	Cover: Artwork by Tom Lovell
	3	4	1945	8	15	Cover: Artwork by Sgt. John Clymer
	3	5	1945	9	1	Cover: Artwork by Sgt. Fred Lasswell
	3	6	1945	9	15	Cover: Artwork by Anthony
	3	7	1945	10	1	Cover: Artwork by Sgt. Fred Lasswell
	3	8	1945	10	15	Cover: Kerr Eby, noted artist who achieved fame with his drawings and paintings of World War I, has seen action with Marines in the Pacific, in this war. Inserted in this issue of the Leatherneck are 24 pages of his sketches made of Marines on Pacific Island battlefronts. Cover of this Leatherneck issue is a Kerr Eby sketch depicting the use of a jeep as an ambulance during the Bougainville campaign.
	3	9	1945	11	1	Cover: 170th Anniversary United States Marine Corps – Artwork by Sgt. Fred Lasswell
	3	10	1945	11	15	
	3	11	1945	12	1	
	3	12	1945	12	15	Cover: Artwork by Anthony
