= Hjärtum Church riot =

Riot against the installation of a Swedish priest

Hjärtum Church Riot
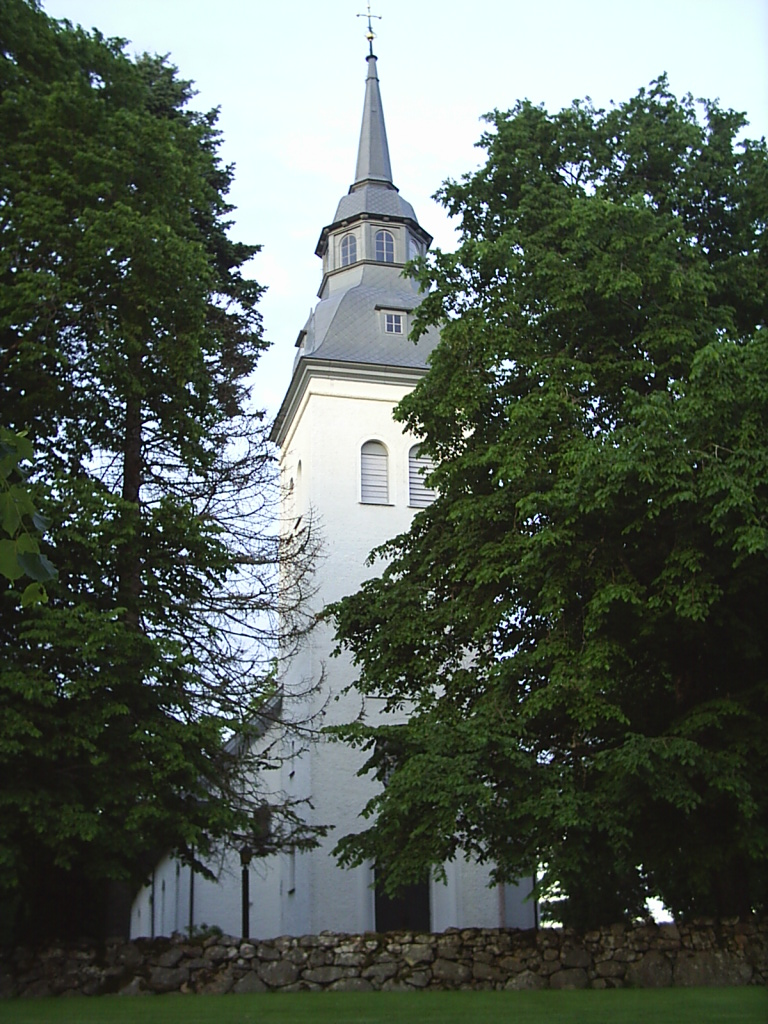
- Picture taken of Hjärtum Church
Date	30 April, 1693
Location	Hjärtum Church
Result	Swedish victory

Belligerents
Church congregation	(yes) Swedish Empire

Commanders and leaders
Unknown	(Swedish Empire) Johan Benedict von Schönleben (Swedish Empire) Unknown Sheriff

Units involved
Unknown	Unknown

Strength
Unknown	Unknown

Casualties and losses
85 arrested	Unknown

The Hjärtum Church riot was an event in Bohuslän on 30 April, 1693, when the Norwegian congregation, angered by the election of a Swedish priest, rioted. This eventually led to the intervention of Swedish authorities from Stockholm, and subsequent arrest of 85 of the congregation members.

== Background ==
In January 1692, the Norwegian priest of Hjärtum Church, Peter Andersen Bakke, had died and the king, Charles XI, chose a Swedish priest by the name of Anders Bonander as his successor. When the Provost, Fridrick Bagge read out the message to the congregation that they would receive a Swedish priest, the congregation began yelling, echoing in the Church walls:

Vi vill icke hava honom till vår präst, vi skola icke hava honom, nej, nej, vi vill icke!

Rough translation:

We do not want him as our priest, we shall not have him, no, no, we do not want him!

The protests continued through the service, with the rector being surrounded by protesters who continued to chant "Nej, nej! Vi vill icke, vi vill icke hava honom!". At one point, part of the congregation rushed out of the church, but were convinced to come back in.

As a result of the events, the Provost immediately reported it to his superiors, who later alerted the authorities in Stockholm.

== Riot ==
On Walpurgis Night on 30 April, Anders Bonander was to give his installation sermon in Hjärtum. His opponents had gathered outside of the church. On the kings behalf, however, Governor von Schönleben had sent a sheriff with a unit of knights to Hjärtum in order to prevent further disorder.

However, when Bonander ascended to the pulpit, the people there rushed out of the church as if on cue. When they eventually returned, violence broke out both outside and inside the church being fought between the clubs of the congregation and the bayonets of the knights.

== Aftermath ==
After the fighting, around 85 of the rioters were sentenced to death, and those who were arrested were sent to Bohus fortress on the Governors' orders in order to await their trial, thus postponing Bonander's installation. However, after they had begged for mercy, their sentences were changed to beatings and fines. The beatings were in the form of running the gauntlet, where they were forced to run between tight rows of knights who hit them. All of the people convicted survived the gauntlet.

== Works cited ==
- Adolfsson, Mats (2007). Fogdemakt och bondevrede 1500 - 1718 [Bailiff power and peasant anger 1500 - 1718] (in Swedish). Natur & Kultur. pp. 280–281. ISBN 9789127356900.
