= A Gypsy Good Time =

1992 novel by Gustav Hasford

- Paperback Fourth Printing
- Author: Gustav Hasford
- Language: English
- Genre: Detective fiction
- Publisher: Washington Square Press (PB)
- Publication date: 1992
- Publication place: United States
- Media type: Print (paperback)
- Pages: 177 pp
- ISBN: 0-671-72917-9 (paperback edition)

A Gypsy Good Time is a 1992 noir detective novel by Vietnam War veteran Gustav Hasford and the last novel he completed before his death in 1993, at forty-five years old. It is written in the style of classic hardboiled detective fiction.

== Plot ==
Vietnam veteran and Private Investigator Dowdy Lewis, Jr. struggles with alcoholism, his time in the Vietnam War and his own rapid aging. He meets Yvonna Lablaine, an attractive red-headed outcast from a prominent Hollywood family, and falls in love. One day however, after a brief but passionate romance, Lewis finds Lablaine dying at his door, murdered. He then embarks on a quest involving drug dealers, mobsters and Hollywood moguls in order to find the truth about what happened and to take revenge on the culprits.

== Availability ==
According to the Official Gustav Hasford Website maintained by Hasford's cousin, The Short-Timers, The Phantom Blooper, and A Gypsy Good Time, are currently out of print. The texts of the two war novels and an excerpt of A Gypsy Good Time were publicly available at the website for at least a decade, but the site has since been redesigned, and Hasford's cousin, who manages the site, has stated he "likely won't be reposting the novel" there.
