= Blanket party =

Type of corporal punishment

A blanket party (also known as "locksocking") is a form of corporal punishment, hazing or retaliation conducted within a peer group, most frequently within the military or military academies. The victim (usually asleep in bed) is restrained by having a blanket flung over them and held down. Other members of the group strike the victim repeatedly with improvised flails, most often a sock or bath towel containing something solid, such as a bar of soap or a padlock.

== Examples ==
In 2015, a United States Army veteran was diagnosed with PTSD (post-traumatic stress disorder) after being the victim of a blanket party during basic training in the late 1970s.

== Full Metal Jacket ==
The term "blanket party" was popularized by the 1987 Stanley Kubrick film Full Metal Jacket. In the film, members of a recruit training platoon throw a blanket party for Private Leonard "Gomer Pyle" Lawrence, an inept recruit whose mistakes repeatedly led to collective punishment for the entire unit.

== See also ==
- List of hazing deaths in the United States
- Running the gauntlet
- Dedovshchina
