= The Short-Timers =

1979 autobiographical novel

- First hardcover edition
- Author: Gustav Hasford
- Language: English
- Genre: Autobiographical, War novel
- Publisher: Harper and Row (HB) & Bantam (PB)
- Publication date: 1979
- Publication place: United States
- Media type: Print (Hardback & Paperback)
- Pages: 192 pp (paperback edition)
- ISBN: 0-553-17152-6 (paperback edition)
- OCLC: 13360352
- Followed by: The Phantom Blooper

The Short-Timers is a 1979 semi-autobiographical novel by U.S. Marine Corps veteran Gustav Hasford, about his experience in the Vietnam War. Hasford served as a combat correspondent with the 1st Marine Division during the Tet Offensive of 1968. As a military journalist, he wrote stories for Leatherneck Magazine, Pacific Stars and Stripes, and Sea Tiger. The novel was adapted into the film Full Metal Jacket (1987), co-scripted by Hasford, Michael Herr, and Stanley Kubrick.

In 1990, Hasford published the sequel The Phantom Blooper: A Novel of Vietnam. The two books were supposed to be part of a "Vietnam Trilogy", but Hasford died before writing the third installment.

== Plot summary ==
The book is divided into three sections, written in completely different styles of prose, and follows James T. "Joker" Davis through his enlistment in the United States Marine Corps and deployment to Vietnam.

Joker and his fellow Marines refer to military personnel in various ways. A "short" service-member, or "short-timer", is one who is approaching the end of his tour of duty in Vietnam, described in the novel as 385 days for Marines and 365 days for members of other armed services. "Lifers" are distinguished not necessarily by their length of time served, but rather by their attitude toward the lower ranks. (Joker describes the distinction as follows: "A lifer is anybody who abuses authority he doesn't deserve to have. There are plenty of civilian lifers.") Finally, the term "poges" (an alternative spelling for the slang term "pogues") is short for "Persons Other than Grunts"—Marines who fill non-combat roles such as cooks, clerks, and mechanics. Poges are a favorite target of the front-line troops' derision, and vice versa.

=== "The Spirit of the Bayonet" ===
During Joker's days in recruit training at Parris Island, a drill instructor, Gunnery Sergeant Gerheim, sadistically breaks the men's spirits and then rebuilds them as heartless killers. Here, Joker befriends two recruits nicknamed "Cowboy" and "Gomer Pyle". The latter, whose real name is Leonard Pratt, earns the wrath of both Gerheim and the rest of the platoon through his ineptitude and weak character. Though he eventually shows great improvement and wins honors at graduation, the constant abuse unbalances his mind. In a final act of madness, he kills Gerheim and then himself in front of the whole platoon.

=== "Body Count" ===
In 1968, during a tour of duty in Vietnam, Joker runs across Cowboy in Da Nang. The two are now, respectively, a war correspondent for the Marines and the assistant leader of the Lusthog Squad. As the Tet Offensive begins, Joker is dispatched to Phu Bai with his photographer, Rafter Man. Here, Joker unwillingly accepts a promotion from corporal to sergeant, and the two journalists travel to Huế to cover the enemy's wartime atrocities and meet Cowboy again. During a battle, Joker is knocked unconscious by a concussion blast and experiences a psychedelic dream sequence. When he comes to several hours later, he learns that the platoon commander was killed by a friendly grenade, and the squad leader went insane and was killed by North Vietnamese Army troops while attacking one of their positions with a BB gun. Now under Cowboy's command, the men battle a sniper who has killed one Lusthog Marine and an entire second squad; the battle ends with Rafter Man's first confirmed kill and Cowboy being wounded slightly. As Joker and Rafter Man start back to Phu Bai, Rafter Man panics and dashes into the path of an oncoming tank, which fatally crushes him. Joker is reassigned to Cowboy's squad as a rifleman, as punishment for wearing an unauthorized peace button on his uniform.

=== "Grunts" ===
Now stationed at Khe Sanh with Cowboy's squad, Joker accompanies them on a patrol through the surrounding jungle. They encounter another sniper here, who wounds three of the men several times. After the company commander goes insane and starts babbling nonsense over the radio, Cowboy decides to pull the squad back and retreat, rather than sacrifice everyone trying to save the wounded men. Animal Mother, the squad's M60 machine gunner, threatens Cowboy's life and refuses to retreat. Promoting Joker to squad leader, Cowboy runs in with his pistol and kills each victim with a shot to the head. He is mortally wounded in the process, and before he can kill himself, the sniper shoots him through the hand. Realizing his duty to Cowboy and the squad, Joker kills Cowboy and leads the rest of the men away.

== Characters ==
- Private (later Corporal, then Sergeant) James T. "Joker" Davis: The protagonist and narrator, who undergoes recruit training at Parris Island and is then sent to Vietnam. He serves first as a military journalist, attaining the rank of sergeant, and later as a rifleman.
- Private (later Sergeant) "Cowboy": One of Joker's fellow recruits, who later becomes a sergeant and a squad leader in Vietnam. He frequently wears a pearl-gray Stetson hat and is killed by Joker after suffering multiple wounds in a sniper ambush. The Phantom Blooper reveals that his real name is John Rucker.
- Private Leonard "Gomer Pyle" Pratt: Another Parris Island recruit, whose ineptitude draws the anger of the entire platoon. He suffers a mental breakdown, kills his drill instructor, and commits suicide just after completing training.
- Gunnery Sergeant Gerheim: The senior drill instructor at Parris Island, who relentlessly berates and abuses his recruits. He is shot and killed by Pratt just before the latter's suicide.
- Lance Corporal "Rafter Man" Compton: A photographer who works with Joker in Vietnam. After mortally wounding a teenage female sniper at the Citadel, he becomes emotionally detached from his squad-mates and is subsequently run over and killed by a tank. His nickname stems from an incident in which he climbed into the rafters of an enlisted men's club to get a better view of the stage, then fell onto the table of a visiting general.
- Lieutenant Robert M. "Mr. Shortround" Bayer III: The commander of the Lusthog Squad's platoon, whose nickname is derived from his small physical stature. He is killed by one of Animal Mother's grenades during the Citadel attack.
- Sergeant Crazy Earl: The squad leader before Cowboy, described as a frail man who always carries a Red Ryder BB gun. During the Citadel attack, he begins shooting at a North Vietnamese position with it and is killed.
- Alice: The squad's advance scout, who walks point during patrols to watch for booby traps and enemy attacks. He collects the feet of enemies he has killed and carries them in a shopping bag. His nickname comes from the fact that his favorite record is Alice's Restaurant by Arlo Guthrie. He is the first to fall victim to the sniper ambush in the jungle.
- Animal Mother: The M60 machine gunner for the squad, who enlisted in the Marines in order to avoid a prison sentence for car theft. He is described as looking "like a big Mexican bandit," with an ammunition belt slung across his chest. He has been demoted from sergeant to private for showing disrespect to a colonel.
- T.H.E. Rock: A squad member who wears a small quartz rock around his neck, supposedly for identification purposes if he is killed. His death in a sniper ambush touches off the Citadel battle.
- Doc Jay: The squad's Navy corpsman, he claims to have "magic hands" and is showing signs of mental trauma as a result of treating wounded soldiers for two years. He is shot in the jungle sniper ambush while trying to treat the other victims. Referred to as "Doc J-for-Joint" in The Phantom Blooper.
- Lance Corporal Stutten: The leader of one of the squad's three fireteams. He sides with Animal Mother against Joker's orders to pull the squad back from the jungle sniper ambush. In The Phantom Blooper, it is revealed that he is living in New Jersey and has a child with a harelip.
- Donlon: The squad radioman, who keeps trying to send/receive messages even when in easy reach of enemy fire. His first name is given as Tom in The Short-Timers, and Bob in The Phantom Blooper; the latter book reveals that he has been discharged, enrolled at UCLA to study political science, and become an antiwar protester.
- Henry "New Guy" Parker: A Marine newly assigned to the squad, whose enthusiasm irritates Animal Mother. He rushes in to save Alice and Doc Jay from the sniper ambush and is cut down as well.

== Critical reception ==
Kirkus Reviews called The Short-Timers "a terse spitball of a book, fine and real and terrifying, that marks a real advance in Vietnam war literature." Marc Leepson of The Washington Post wrote: "There is a vivid description of Hue in the aftermath of the 1968 Tet offensive and a grimly realistic portrayal of Marines under siege at Khesanh. Hasford also includes the obligatory scenes of search-and-destroy jungle patrols, unexpected fire fights, and random episodes of gratuitous violence, including maiming, fragging and raping. All this has been presented in much better literary and dramatic terms elsewhere."

== Availability ==
According to the Gustav Hasford website maintained by Hasford's cousin Jason Aaron, The Short-Timers, The Phantom Blooper: A Novel of Vietnam, and Hasford's third and last completed book, a noir detective novel titled A Gypsy Good Time (1992), are currently out of print. The texts of the two war novels and an excerpt of A Gypsy Good Time were publicly available at the web-site for at least a decade, but the site has since been redesigned, and Aaron, who manages the site, has stated he "likely won't be reposting the novel" there as he does not own the rights.
