= Running the gauntlet =

Form of physical punishment

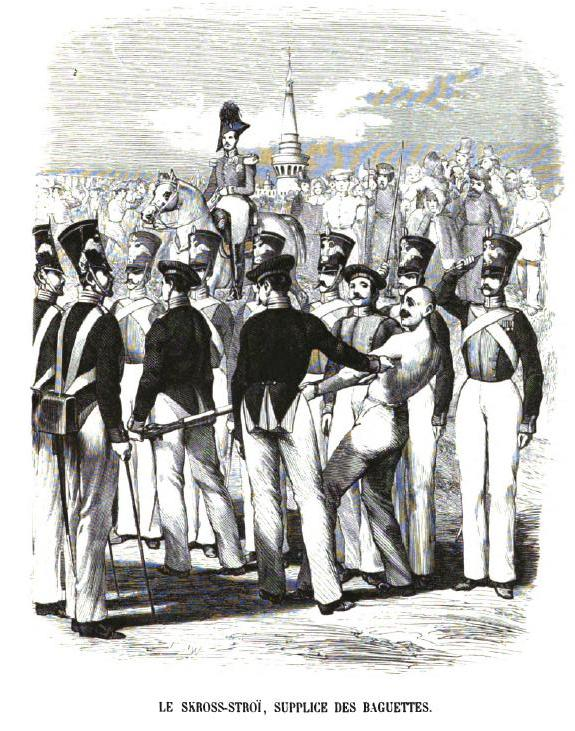
Gauntlet in Russia, 1845

"Running the gauntlet" is a form of corporal punishment in which one or more individuals are forced to run between two rows of people who attack them with weapons. Metaphorically, the term is also used to convey a public trial that one must overcome.

== Etymology and spelling ==
The word gauntlet originates from Swedish gatlopp, from gata 'lane' and lopp 'course, running'. It was borrowed into English in the 17th century, probably from English and Swedish soldiers fighting in the Protestant armies during the Thirty Years' War. Later on, during the reign of the monarch Gustav III in the 1770s, the punishment was rarely used in the Swedish Army and was abolished in the Swedish Army in 1851.

The word in English was originally spelled gantelope or gantlope, but soon its pronunciation was influenced by the unrelated word gauntlet, meaning an armored glove, derived from the French: gantelet. The spelling changed with the pronunciation. Both senses of gauntlet had the variant spelling gantlet. For the punishment, the spelling gantlet is preferred in American English usage guides by Bryan Garner and Robert Hartwell Fiske and is listed as a variant spelling of gauntlet by American dictionaries. British dictionaries label gantlet as American.

== Usage and severity ==
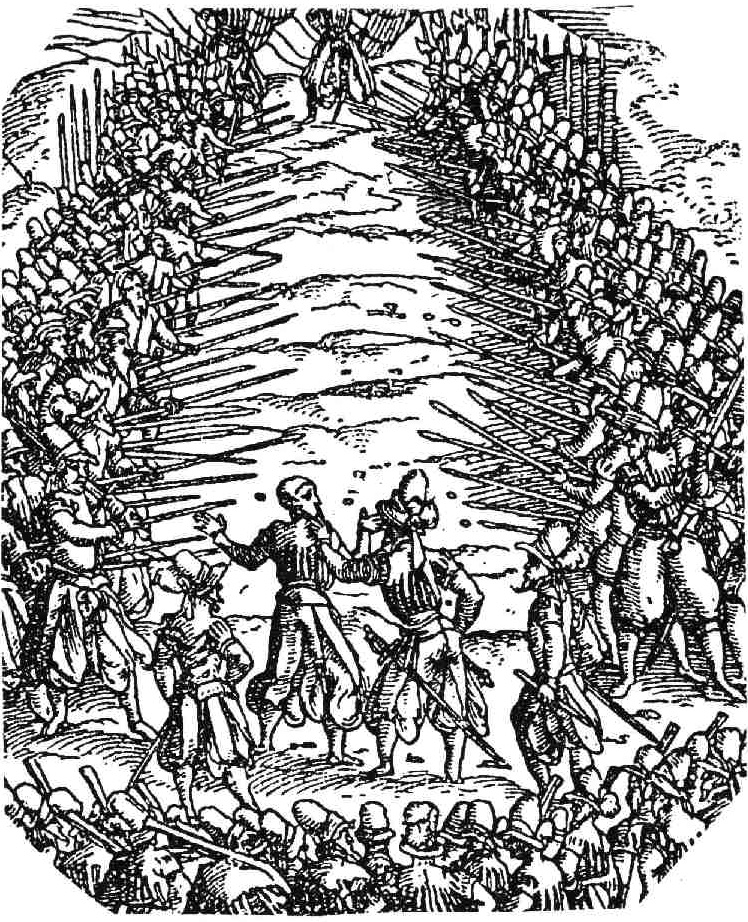
Spiessgasse (pike-alley), Jost Amman illustration

A naval version of the gauntlet was historically used in the Royal Navy as a punishment for minor offences such as leaving the crew berths in an unsanitary state, or failing to return on time from leave. The condemned was ordered to make a prescribed number of circuits around the ship's deck, while his shipmates struck him with improvised versions of the cat o' nine tails. Runs of the gauntlet could also be preceded by a dozen lashes from the boatswain's cat o' nine tails, so that any subsequent blows from the crew would aggravate the lacerations on his back. The effectiveness of the punishment would somewhat depend on the popularity of the sailor being punished, and the seriousness of the offence. In 1760, Francis Lanyon, a seaman aboard the guardship HMS Royal George, was sentenced to three runs of the gauntlet, for failing to return from leave. The crew clearly disagreed with the punishment, as the ship's lieutenant later recorded that Lanyon received no substantial injury from the process. The naval punishment of running the gauntlet was abolished by Admiralty Order in 1806.

In the early records of the Dutch colonial settlement of New Amsterdam appears a detailed description of running the "Gantlope/Gantloppe" as a punishment for the "Court Martial of Melchior Claes" (a soldier). It states "... The Court Marshall doe adjudge that hee shall run the Gantlope once the length of the fort, where according to the Custome of that punishment the souldyers shall have switches delivered to them with which they shall strike him as he passes through them stript to the wast, and at the fort gate the Marshall is to receive him and there to kick him out of the Garrison as a cashiered person where hee is no more to returne ..."

== Native American usage ==
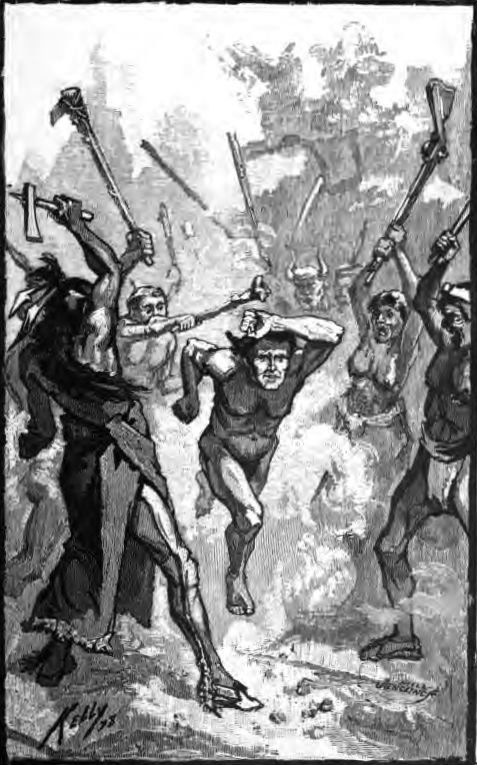
A captive runs the gauntlet between Shawnee warriors.

Several Native American tribes of the Eastern Woodlands cultural area forced prisoners to run the gauntlet (see Captives in American Indian Wars). The Jesuit Isaac Jogues was subject to this treatment while a prisoner of the Iroquois in 1641. He described the ordeal in a letter that appears in the book The Jesuit Martyrs of North America: "Before arriving (at the Iroquois Village) we met the young men of the country, in a line armed with sticks...", and he and his fellow Frenchmen were made to walk slowly past them "for the sake of giving time to anyone who struck us."

In 1755, Charles Stuart was taken prisoner by Lenape warriors during the Great Cove massacre, and upon arriving at the village of Kittanning, was forced to run the gauntlet. He provides a description of the practice:

on Entring into the Town we were obliged to Pass Between Two Rows of Indians Containing abt 100 on Each Side, who were arm'd with various kind of Weapons such as Axes Tomhawks Cutlasses Hoop Poles, Pieces of Wood &c, But they did not strike with the Axes, and only Used the Heads and Handles of their Tomhawks, But used the Blades of the Cutlasses, tho' not with so much Severity as To Kill. I had however the Misfortune to receive a Blow on the Side of my Forehead With one of them wch Cut me To the Bone, & a Billet of Wood Strikeing on the Head abt the Same time, Between Both I was Knock'd down to the Ground - It was, only the more elderly People both, Male and Female wch rece'd this Useage - the young prisioners of Both Sexes Escaped without it.

Several years before he fought in the American Revolutionary War, John Stark was captured by natives and forced to run a gauntlet. Knowing what was about to happen, Stark stunned them by grabbing the weapon away from the first person about to strike him and proceeded to attack the warrior with it. The warriors and their chief were so surprised by this that they stopped the gauntlet and adopted him into their tribe. He was later ransomed along with Amos Eastman for $163 and returned home.

== Modern use ==
=== Fitness trail in communist Poland ===
During the days of the Polish People’s Republic, the communist authorities forced political dissidents, criminals, protestors, and prisoners through a gauntlet-like process, which they called the ścieżka zdrowia (literally 'health path', but idiomatically used to mean early fitness trails).

In KOR, A History of the Worker's Defense Committee in Poland, 1976–1981, Jan Józef Lipski documents the experience of one such criminal during the June 1976 protests:

On the first day I walked the "path of health" on the way from a truck to the police van, about 50 metres. They ordered me to walk slowly so that each one could hit me. They beat me with fists, clubs, boots. At the very end, I fell down. I couldn't get up again under the hail of clubs... A "path of health" from the van to the second floor... When they took us to get haircuts – another "path of health" some 40 metres long, from the door of the room all the way to the car... Yet another 10 metres in the corridor leading to the table... Then, a "path of health" (10 metres) to cell number nine... to the court in a prison truck; of course another "path of health"... then again a "path" from prison to prison. I survived another "path of health" in the morning when they took me to Kielce.

— Waldemar Michalski,

=== Military custom ===
Similar practices are used in other initiations and rites of passage, as on pollywogs (those passing the equator for the first time includes a paddling version)

In one Tailhook Association convention for Navy and Marine Corps pilots, female participants were allegedly forced to run the gauntlet in a hotel hallway as male participants fondled them.

=== Sports ===
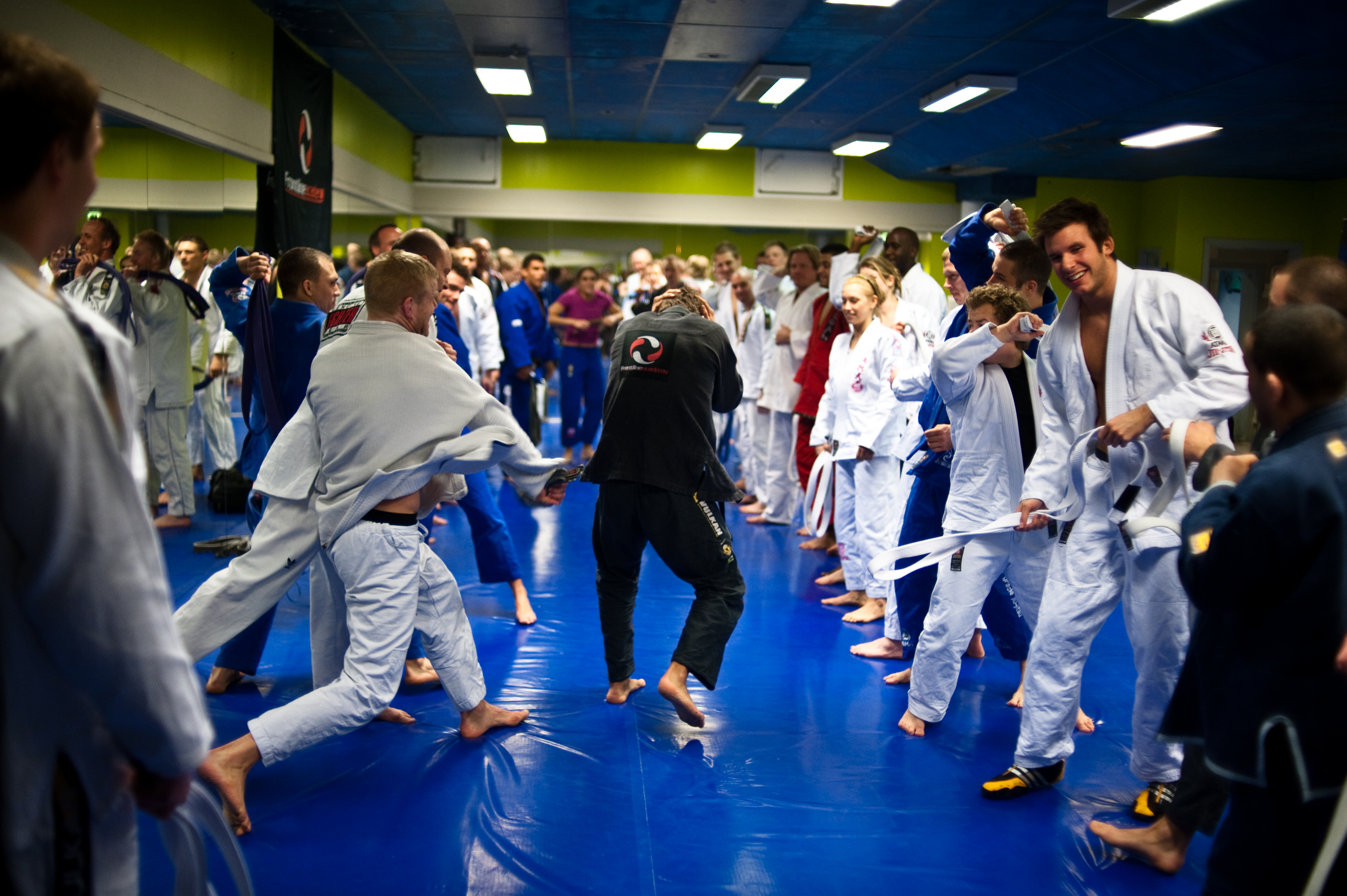
New belt promotion being celebrated by running the gauntlet of belts

In certain team sports, such as lacrosse and ice hockey, the gauntlet is a common name for a type of drill whereby players are blocked or checked by the entire team in sequence.

In Brazilian jiu-jitsu, when a student is promoted to their next coloured belt, they are sometimes required to run between two rows of their fellow students, who strike them with their own belts.

== See also ==
- Blanket party
