= The Phantom Blooper =

1990 novel by Gustav Hasford

- First edition hardback cover
- Author: Gustav Hasford
- Language: English
- Genre: Autobiographical, War novel
- Publisher: Bantam Dell
- Publication date: Feb 1990
- Publication place: United States
- Media type: Print (Hardback & Paperback)
- ISBN: 0-553-05718-9
- OCLC: 20352730
- Dewey Decimal: 813/.54 20
- LC Class: PS3558.A7233 P45 1990
- Preceded by: The Short-Timers

The Phantom Blooper: A Novel of Vietnam is a 1990 novel written by Gustav Hasford and the sequel to The Short-Timers (1979). It continues to follow James T. "Joker" Davis through his Vietnam odyssey. The book was supposed to be the second of a "Vietnam Trilogy", but Hasford died before writing the third installment.

== Plot ==
The novel begins sometime after The Short-Timers leaves off and is divided into three parts.

=== "The Winter Soldiers" ===
Having been demoted from Sergeant to Private, Joker is still at the Khe Sanh base, which is about to be abandoned by American Marines after withstanding an extended siege by the North Vietnamese Army. He believes most of his previous squad-mates are dead, even the seemingly indestructible Animal Mother. Joker blames their deaths on "The Phantom Blooper": an elusive enemy, supposedly American and armed with an M79 grenade launcher, who fights alongside the Viet Cong against his countrymen.

Joker is still haunted by the memory of his friend Cowboy, who had been wounded in a sniper ambush and whom Joker mercy-killed in order to keep the rest of their squad from being cut down. As a result, Joker's behavior has become increasingly erratic and violent. He sets up one of his squad-mates to be killed in an attempt to draw the Phantom Blooper out of hiding, then forces an inattentive Marine on guard duty to hold a live hand grenade with the pin out. Later, as NVA troops attempt to overrun the base, Joker splits his platoon sergeant's tongue with a straight razor.

The Marines turn back the attack, suffering heavy losses in the process. The next night, Joker ventures out in search of the Phantom Blooper, but is wounded by friendly fire and captured by the enemy.

=== "Travels with Charlie" ===
Joker has been living and working in a small Viet Cong village for over a year since his capture, waiting for a chance to escape. He has not been tortured or sent to a POW camp, and his captors have begun to trust him to some degree. In Joker's mind, his best chance is to fool them into believing he has converted to their cause, to accompany them on an attack against an American position, and then to make his escape when the shooting starts. As time passes, however, he begins to side increasingly with the Viet Cong, seeing them – the people he has been trained to kill – as ordinary human beings just like himself. When a team of Army soldiers arrives to rescue him, he is wounded in the ensuing firefight but manages to shoot down one of their choppers with a discarded M79 before passing out and being evacuated from the area.

=== "The Proud Flesh" ===
Joker is sent to Yokosuka Naval Hospital in Japan for medical treatment and psychological counseling. He quickly makes it clear that he does not regret any of his actions as a Viet Cong captive, and he expresses his disgust and outrage at having been sent by his country to fight in a futile war. Despite initial threats of a court-martial for treason, he is eventually given a Section 8 discharge and sent home to the United States.

Upon arriving in California, Joker finds that his squad radioman, Donlon, is alive, attending college, and protesting the war. He also learns that Animal Mother was captured by the Viet Cong, but escaped from a POW camp and has since returned to active duty. Joker and Donlon attend a demonstration that is quickly and forcefully broken up by the police, but Joker manages to slip away with the help of an ex-Marine cop who served with him at Khe Sanh. Next, Joker travels to Cowboy's home in Kansas, and has a brief and uneasy meeting with Cowboy's parents. Their son's body was never recovered from the jungle, and Joker chooses not to tell them that he mercy-killed Cowboy. Finally, Joker reaches his family's farm in Alabama, all the while feeling a growing disillusionment with the war and America. Deciding there is nothing left for him in the United States, and realizing that he has become the Phantom Blooper he was once obsessed with stopping, he sets out to return to Vietnam and his life among the Viet Cong villagers.

== Main characters ==
- James T. "Joker" Davis: The protagonist of both this novel and The Short-Timers. He has been demoted from Sergeant to Private for failing to recover Cowboy's body from the jungle, and displays little regard for the safety of his fellow Marines. His apathy gradually shifts into outright hostility toward the American armed forces and their involvement in Vietnam.
- Donlon: Joker's old radioman, who has been discharged from the Marines since the end of The Short-Timers. He is now married, enrolled in college, and protesting the war. During a demonstration, he is struck in the face by a police officer and loses an eye.
- Daddy D.A.: A platoon leader suffering from post-traumatic stress disorder due to his service in Vietnam. Joker finds him dry-firing a pistol into his head; later, Joker learns that he has joined the Selous Scouts and become an alcoholic.
- The Kid from Brooklyn: A lance corporal who develops a love of stamp collecting after returning from an R&R trip to Tokyo. Joker sets him up to be killed as bait to draw the Phantom Blooper out of hiding.
- Thunder: A Marine sniper who later joins the Los Angeles Police Department and is assigned to its SWAT team. He secretly sympathizes with Donlon's antiwar protest activities.
- Black John Wayne: An African-American Marine who has rallied many of his squad-mates to ignore any orders to participate in the war effort. He is killed in a flamethrower attack when the NVA forces try to overrun Khe Sanh.
- Beaver Cleaver: Joker's platoon sergeant, who constantly antagonizes his subordinates and is suspected of killing a captain who caught him trading weapons to the Viet Cong for drugs. He gets his tongue split by Joker when the NVA forces try to overrun Khe Sanh.
- Kieu Chi Song: A schoolteacher living in the Viet Cong jungle village of Hoa Binh, where Joker is taken after his capture. She looks after him and tries to indoctrinate him in the Viet Cong way of life. She is hanged when an Army team raids the village to rescue Joker.

== Reception ==
This sequel made less of an impact than The Short-Timers (1979), which was the basis for the film Full Metal Jacket (1987). (Some dialogue from The Phantom Blooper is also present in Full Metal Jacket.) Nonetheless, The Phantom Blooper was highly regarded by reviewers. Before Hasford died in 1993, he had planned to continue Joker's story in a third novel.

== Availability ==
According to the Official Gustav Hasford Website maintained by Hasford's cousin, Jason Aaron, The Short-Timers, The Phantom Blooper: A Novel of Vietnam, and Hasford's third and last completed book, a noir detective novel titled A Gypsy Good Time (1992), are currently out of print. The texts of the two war novels and an excerpt of A Gypsy Good Time were publicly available at the website for at least a decade, but the site has since been redesigned, and Aaron, who manages the site, has stated he "likely won't be reposting the novel" there.
