= Full Metal Furies =

2018 video game

- Developer: Cellar Door Games
- Publisher: Cellar Door Games
- Platforms: Microsoft Windows, Xbox One, Nintendo Switch
- Release: Microsoft Windows & Xbox One; January 17, 2018; Nintendo Switch; November 6, 2018
- Genres: Action, adventure
- Modes: Single-player, multiplayer

Full Metal Furies is an action adventure video game developed and published by Cellar Door Games. Announced in February 2017, it was released on January 17, 2018 for Microsoft Windows and Xbox One.

== Development ==
After Cellar Door Games's success with Rogue Legacy, the development for Full Metal Furies commenced. It had been in development for three years before it was announced on February 20, 2017. The game was released onto Microsoft Windows and Xbox One on January 17, 2018.

== Reception ==
Reception

Aggregate score
Aggregator	Score
Metacritic	PC: 85/100; XONE: 75/100; NS: 75/100

The game received a Metacritic score of 75 and 85 on Xbox One and PC platforms, respectively, indicating generally favorable reviews. Despite the reviews, the game failed to break even, causing Cellar Door Games to describe it as "a pretty massive failure".
