= Full Metal Jacket Diary =

Book by Matthew Modine

- Author: Matthew Modine
- Language: English
- Publisher: Rugged Land
- Publication date: October 25, 2005
- Publication place: United States
- Media type: Print (Hardcover)
- Pages: 224
- ISBN: 1-59071-047-9

Full Metal Jacket Diary is a book written by American author, actor and photographer Matthew Modine and published by Rugged Land October 25, 2005. The book contains photos and diary entries of his experiences over a two-year period while working on the Stanley Kubrick film Full Metal Jacket.

Modine played the lead role of Private Joker, a U.S. Marine who is sent to Vietnam as a war correspondent for Stars and Stripes. While filming, Modine was encouraged by Kubrick to keep a diary of his experiences. Notorious for his closed film sets, Kubrick granted Modine the rare privilege of photographing the process, capturing moments on the set. Modine felt keeping a photographic and written diary would be a beneficial opportunity for his preparation as a war correspondent in the film.

Modine used a Rolleiflex camera, capturing glimpses of Kubrick's artistic and professional process. Full Metal Jacket Diary was published in limited edition book form in 2005 with a metal book jacket. "I always wanted to do something with the pictures because I think they're beautiful..." says Modine of his decision to publish the book. "Now I feel enough time passed and I can look back at those days as being part of another person's life, this young kid who went on a journey to work with a legend..."

In addition to being a critical success, the book won the AIGA "50 Books/50 Covers of 2006" design award with a juror noting that it's "the only book I can imagine covered in a metal jacket".

In 2010, Modine partnered with producer Adam Rackoff to begin transforming his book into an interactive iPad application, by raising funds through Kickstarter.
