= Gustav Hasford =

American novelist (1947–1993)

- Hasford during his time in Vietnam
- Born: Jerry Gustave Hasford; November 28, 1947; Haleyville, Alabama, U.S.
- Died: January 29, 1993 (aged 45); Aegina, Greece
- Resting place: Haleyville, Alabama, U.S.
- Education: Lower Columbia College; Santa Monica City College
- Occupations: Writer, military veteran
- Writing career
- Pen name: Gustav Hasford
- Period: 1975–1993
- Notable works: The Short-Timers; The Phantom Blooper; A Gypsy Good Time
- Military service
- Allegiance: United States
- Branch: United States Marine Corps
- Service years: 1966–1968
- Rank: Corporal
- Unit: 1st Marine Division
- Conflicts: Vietnam War; *Tết Offensive; **Battle of Huế; *Operation Pegasus
- Awards: Navy & Marine Corps Achievement Medal with "V" device; Vietnam Service Medal with 1 Service Star; Vietnam Campaign Medal with Device; Good Conduct Medal; Marksman Badge with Pistol Bar

Jerry Gustave Hasford (November 28, 1947 – January 29, 1993), also known under his pen name Gustav Hasford, was an American Marine, novelist, journalist and poet. His semi-autobiographical novel The Short-Timers (1979) was the basis for the film Full Metal Jacket (1987), for which Hasford shared a nomination for the Academy Award for Best Adapted Screenplay. He was a Vietnam War veteran, who served as a war correspondent. He was a cousin of comic book writer Jason Aaron.

== Biography ==
=== Early life ===
Hasford was born on November 28, 1947 in Haleyville, Alabama to Hassell Gustave and Hazel Noblett Hasford. As a youth, he worked for the Franklin County Times and Northwest Alabamian, and edited a quarterly literary journal, Freelance. He left high school in 1966.

=== Military service ===
Hasford enlisted in the United States Marine Corps on May 6, 1966 at the age of eighteen. He began his active service on September 2, 1966. He was trained as a military journalist at the Defense Information School in Fort Benjamin Harrison in Maryland. He received further training as a combat correspondent at Marine Corps Base Camp Pendleton in California.

Hasford interviewing prisoners of war during the Vietnam War.

After completing his training, Hasford initially served in North Carolina, where he published a base newspaper. He was later sent to Vietnam to serve as a combat correspondent during the Vietnam War. As a military journalist, he wrote stories for Leatherneck Magazine, Pacific Stars and Stripes, and Sea Tiger. During his tour in Vietnam, Hasford was awarded the Navy & Marine Corps Achievement Medal with Valor Device, during the Battle of Huế of the Tết Offensive in January-March 1968. He also participated in Operation Pegasus in April 1968.

Steve "Bernie" Berntson, who served alongside Hasford in Vietnam, later recounted a incident that took place on February 13, 1968 during the Battle of Huế. A Marine Corps colonel was being interviewed by various news correspondents, including Walter Cronkite. Cronkite asked the colonel about rumors of looting by marines, which the colonel vigorously denied. At that point, Hasford entered the room holding two onyx statues of panthers, shouting "Bernie, look what I found!" Berntson yelled for Hasford to "get rid of them", upon which Hasford panicked and threw the statues into a refrigerator.

Hasford ended his active service on August 22, 1968. His enlisted service ended on May 5, 1972. He ended his military career with the rank of corporal.

=== Early literary career ===
After leaving the Marine Corps, Hasford moved to Kelso, Washington with his parents, where he attended Lower Columbia College in Longview, Washington. He later relocated to California, where he attended Santa Monica City College in Santa Monica, California.

Hasford attended the 1972 Clarion Workshop and associated with various science fiction writers of the 1970s, including Arthur Byron Cover and David J. Skal. He had several short stories published in magazines and anthologies such as Space and Time and Damon Knight's Orbit series. He also published the poem "Bedtime Story" in a 1972 edition of Winning Hearts and Minds, the first anthology of writing about the war by veterans. The poem was reprinted in Carrying the Darkness in 1985.

=== The Short-Timers ===
In 1978, Hasford attended the Milford Writer's Workshop and met veteran science fiction author Frederik Pohl, who was then an editor at Bantam Books. At Pohl's suggestion, Hasford submitted The Short-Timers, and Pohl promptly bought it for Bantam.

The Short-Timers was published in 1979 and became a best-seller, described in Newsweek as "[t]he best work of fiction about the Vietnam War". Described by Philip Beidler as "indisputable genius", The Short-Timers is studied in university Vietnam literature classes.

In 1982, director Stanley Kubrick discovered The Short-Timers while reading Kirkus Reviews. Kubrick read the novel twice; he concluded it is "a unique, absolutely wonderful book" and decided to adapt it for his next film. According to Kubrick, he was drawn to the book's dialogue, which he found "almost poetic in its carved-out, stark quality". In 1985, Kubrick contacted Hasford and invited him to join Kubrick and screenwriter Michael Herr in adapting the book; they spoke by telephone three to four times a week for hours at a time. Kubrick wrote a detailed treatment of the novel, which Herr then developed into the first draft of the film script. Kubrick worried the audience might misread the book's title as a reference to people who did only half a day's work so changed it to Full Metal Jacket after coming across the phrase in a gun catalogue. After the first draft was complete, Kubrick telephoned his orders to Hasford and Herr, who mailed their submissions to him. Kubrick read and edited Hasford's and Herr's submissions, and the team repeated the process. Neither Hasford nor Herr knew how much each had contributed to the screenplay, which led to a dispute over the final credits. Hasford said: "We were like guys on an assembly line in the car factory. I was putting on one widget and Michael was putting on another widget and Stanley was the only one who knew that this was going to end up being a car." At some point, Kubrick wanted to meet Hasford in person, but Herr advised against this, describing him as a "scary man, a big, haunted marine", and did not believe Hasford and Kubrick would "get on". Kubrick, however, insisted on the meeting, which occurred at Kubrick's house in England. The meeting went poorly; Kubrick privately told Herr: "I can't deal with this man," and Hasford did not meet with Kubrick again. Full Metal Jacket was released in summer 1987, grossing $120 million against a budget of $16.5–30 million and receiving positive reviews from critics. The screenplay by Hasford, Kubrick, and Herr was nominated for an Academy Award for Best Adapted Screenplay. Hasford's actual contributions were a subject of dispute among the three, with Hasford stating that Kubrick and Herr had unsuccessfully pressured him to settle for an "additional dialogue" credit, and ultimately Hasford chose not to attend the Oscar ceremonies.

=== Library books theft charges ===
In 1985, Hasford had borrowed 98 books from the Sacramento, California, public library but never returned them. An arrest warrant for misdemeanor grand theft was issued, but local authorities were unable to find him. In March 1988, shortly before the Academy Awards ceremony, campus police from California Polytechnic State University in San Luis Obispo, California, found nearly 10,000 library books in his rented storage locker. At that time, he had 87 overdue books and five years of Civil War Times magazine issues checked out from the Cal Poly-SLO library; the materials were initially valued at $3,000 (equivalent to $8,000 in 2025) They were later revalued at $20,000 (equivalent to $54,000 in 2025).

Hasford's book collection included books borrowed (and never returned) from dozens of libraries across the United States, from libraries in Australia and the United Kingdom, and, allegedly, books taken from the homes of acquaintances. Among them were 19th-century books on Edgar Allan Poe and the American Civil War. Hasford had obtained borrowing privileges at Cal Poly-SLO as a California resident, using the residential address of a motel near campus and a false Social Security number.

In June 1988, he was charged with two counts of grand theft and ten counts of possession of stolen property. Judge Harry Woolpert of the San Luis Obispo County Superior Court scheduled the trial hearings to begin on December 5. During the trial, Hasford rearranged to plead guilty to possession of stolen property. On January 4, 1989, Hasford was sentenced to six months' imprisonment (of which he served three months) and promised to pay $1,100 (equivalent to $3,000 in 2025) restitution from the royalties of his future works. He was also ordered to pay the shipping costs for the return of 748 books to nine libraries throughout the United States.

In a form letter addressed to friends and family, Hasford claimed that he wanted the books to research a never-published book on the Civil War. He described his difficulties as "a vicious attack launched against me by Moral Majority fanatics backed up by the full power of the Fascist State."

=== Second and third novels ===
In 1990, Hasford published a second novel, The Phantom Blooper, which was a sequel to The Short-Timers. The sequel was intended to be the second installment of a "Vietnam Trilogy", but Hasford died before writing the third installment. Hasford's final novel titled A Gypsy Good Time, a hardboiled, noir detective story set in Los Angeles, was published in 1992.

After completing The Phantom Blooper, Hasford planned to write a third Vietnam novel. One mooted title for the novel was Exit Wounds. The novel would have seen Joker, home from the Vietnam War, working as a reporter in Los Angeles. Hasford completed little work on the novel before his death.

=== Later life and death ===
Hasford, impoverished and suffering from untreated diabetes, moved to the Greek island of Aegina and died there of heart failure on 29 January 1993, aged 45. He is interred at Winston Memorial Cemetery in Haleyville, Alabama.

== Bilbliography ==
- Novels
  - The Short-Timers (1979) ISBN 0-553-23945-7
  - The Phantom Blooper: A Novel of Vietnam (1990) ISBN 0-553-05718-9
  - A Gypsy Good Time (1992) ISBN 0-671-72917-9
- Short fiction
  - "Twilight" (1972)
  - "Sunchild" (1973)
  - "The Disneyland Man" (1973)
  - "Black Roses" (1975)
  - "Heartland" (1975)
  - "A Periodic Table of the Elements" (1976)
  - "The Man Who Ate Greek Coins" (1976)
  - "Cezanne, Dying in the Rain" (1977)
- Poetry
  - "Bedtime Story" (1972)
