= Full Metal Jacket =

1987 war film by Stanley Kubrick

- Theatrical release poster
- Directed by: Stanley Kubrick
- Screenplay by: Stanley Kubrick; Michael Herr; Gustav Hasford
- Based on: The Short-Timers by Gustav Hasford
- Produced by: Stanley Kubrick
- Starring: Matthew Modine; Adam Baldwin; Vincent D'Onofrio; R. Lee Ermey; Dorian Harewood; Arliss Howard; Kevyn Major Howard; Ed O'Ross
- Cinematography: Douglas Milsome
- Edited by: Martin Hunter
- Music by: Abigail Mead
- Production companies: Natant; Harrier Films
- Distributed by: Warner Bros.
- Release dates: June 17, 1987 (Samuel Goldwyn Theater); June 26, 1987 (United States); September 11, 1987 (United Kingdom)
- Running time: 116 minutes
- Countries: United Kingdom; United States
- Language: English
- Budget: $16.5–30 million
- Box office: $120 million

Full Metal Jacket is a 1987 war film directed and produced by Stanley Kubrick from a screenplay he co-wrote with Michael Herr and Gustav Hasford. The film is based on Hasford's 1979 autobiographical novel The Short-Timers. It stars Matthew Modine, R. Lee Ermey, Vincent D'Onofrio, Adam Baldwin, Dorian Harewood, and Arliss Howard.

The storyline follows a platoon of U.S. Marines through their boot camp training at Marine Corps Recruit Depot Parris Island, South Carolina. The first half of the film focuses primarily on privates J. T. Davis and Leonard Lawrence, nicknamed "Joker" and "Pyle" respectively, who struggle under their abusive drill instructor, Gunnery Sergeant Hartman. The second half portrays the experiences of Joker and other Marines in the Vietnamese cities of Da Nang and Huế during the Tet Offensive of the Vietnam War. The film's title refers to the full metal jacket bullet used by military servicemen.

Full Metal Jacket was theatrically released in the United States on June 26, 1987, by Warner Bros., and in the United Kingdom on September 11, 1987. It was the second last of Kubrick's films to be released during his lifetime. The film grossed $120 million against a budget of $16.5–30 million and received positive reviews from critics. It was nominated for an Academy Award for Best Adapted Screenplay, and was also nominated for two BAFTA Awards, while Ermey was nominated for a Golden Globe Award for Best Supporting Actor – Motion Picture for his performance. In 2001, the American Film Institute placed the film at number 95 in its poll titled "AFI's 100 Years...100 Thrills."

== Plot ==
During the Vietnam War, a group of United States Marine Corps recruits arrive for eight weeks of Recruit Training at Parris Island, where Senior Drill Instructor Gunnery Sergeant Hartman uses harsh methods to train them for combat. Among the recruits are the wisecracking J. T. Davis, who is nicknamed "Joker" after mocking Hartman, and the overweight and dimwitted Leonard Lawrence, whom Hartman nicknames "Gomer Pyle".

During training, Pyle struggles to meet Hartman's expectations and is eventually paired with Joker. Pyle shows signs of improvement, but during an inspection, Hartman discovers a jelly doughnut in Pyle's footlocker. Believing the platoon has failed to improve Pyle, Hartman begins a policy of collective punishment in which he will punish everyone except for Pyle for each mistake he makes. In retaliation, the recruits haze Pyle with a blanket party, which Joker reluctantly participates in under pressure. Afterwards, Pyle appears to reinvent himself into a model recruit, showing particular expertise in marksmanship. This impresses Hartman but worries Joker, who believes Pyle may be suffering a mental breakdown after seeing Pyle talk to his rifle.

The night before the new Marines are to leave Parris Island, Joker, on fire watch, discovers Pyle in the barracks head (Note: United States Marines being naval infantry, the latrine in a USMC barracks would properly be referred to in military terminology as a "head". Sailors in the United States Navy also use the term "head".) loading his M14 rifle with live ammunition, executing drill commands, and loudly reciting the Rifleman's Creed. The whole platoon awakened by the commotion, Hartman orders Pyle to put down the rifle, but Pyle kills him instead. He considers shooting Joker as well, but commits suicide instead.

By January 1968, Joker is a sergeant journalist based in Da Nang for the newspaper Stars and Stripes alongside Private First Class "Rafter Man", a combat photographer. On the morning after their base is attacked as part of the Tet Offensive, Joker and Rafter Man are sent to Phu Bai, where Joker searches for and reunites with Sergeant "Cowboy" Evans, a friend from Parris Island who now serves in a rifle squad.

During the Battle of Huế, platoon leader Lieutenant "'Mr. Touchdown'" Schinoski is killed, leaving Sergeant "Crazy Earl" to take his place as squad leader. As they enter the city, the squad engages in combat with enemy forces and secure the area. Later, during a patrol, a booby-trapped rabbit toy kills Crazy Earl, leaving Cowboy in command. Becoming lost in the city, the squad is attacked by a Viet Cong sniper who lures in and fatally shoots "Eightball" and "Doc Jay". As the squad closes in on the sniper's location, Cowboy is killed.

Assuming command, squad machine gunner "Animal Mother" leads an attack on the sniper. Joker locates her first, but his M16 rifle jams. The sniper, a teenage girl, overhears this and opens fire, while Rafter Man shoots and mortally wounds her. As the squad converges on the sniper, she begs for death, leading to an argument over whether to kill her or leave her to die in pain. Animal Mother agrees to a mercy killing but only if Joker will handle it; after some hesitation, Joker shoots her. As night falls, the Marines march to the Perfume River singing the "Mickey Mouse March". Joker narrates his thoughts in a final voice-over line: "I am so happy that I am alive, in one piece, and short. I'm in a world of shit, yes, but I am alive. And I am not afraid."

== Cast ==
- Matthew Modine as Private (later Sergeant) James T. "Joker" Davis, a wisecracking, intellectual young Marine. On set, Modine kept a diary that in 2005 was adapted into a book and in 2013 into an interactive app.
- Adam Baldwin as Sergeant "Animal Mother", a nihilistic, combat-hungry machine gunner in the Lusthog Squad who takes pride in killing enemy soldiers, and scorns any authority other than his own.
- Vincent D'Onofrio as Private Leonard "Gomer Pyle" Lawrence, (Note: The "Gomer Pyle" nickname recalls the character from the Gomer Pyle, U.S.M.C. TV sitcom. He stands out from the other characters and is passively resistant to being stamped by Hartman into the Marine Corps mold.) an overweight, slow-minded recruit who is the subject of Hartman's abuse and mockery. According to Kubrick, Pyle was "the hardest part to cast in the whole movie"; Modine suggested D'Onofrio to Kubrick. D'Onofrio was required to gain 70 pounds (32 kg) for the role.
- R. Lee Ermey (credited as "Lee Ermey") as Gunnery Sergeant L. Hartman, a harsh, foul-mouthed and ruthless senior drill instructor. Ermey had played a similar character in the 1978 Vietnam War film The Boys in Company C. Ermey used his own experience as a U.S. Marines drill instructor in the Vietnam War to improvise much of his dialogue, coming up with over 50 pages of insults.
- Dorian Harewood as Corporal "Eightball", an African-American member of the squad unfazed by racial slurs, and Animal Mother's closest friend.
- Arliss Howard as Private (later Sergeant) "Cowboy" Evans, a friend of Joker originally from Texas and a member of the Lusthog Squad.
- Kevyn Major Howard as Private First Class "Rafter Man", a combat photographer.
- Ed O'Ross as First Lieutenant Walter J. "Mr. Touchdown" Schinoski, the Lusthog Squad's platoon leader.
- John Terry as First Lieutenant Lockhart, the editor in charge of the Da Nang division of Stars and Stripes.
- Kieron Jecchinis as Sergeant "Crazy Earl", the first Lusthog Squad leader.
- Bruce Boa as the Colonel who scolds Joker for writing “Born to Kill” on his helmet and simultaneously wearing a peace symbol on his lapel.
- Kirk Taylor as Private "Payback", a squad member.
- John Stafford as "Doc Jay," a Navy hospital corpsman providing medical support for the squad.
- Tim Colceri as a sadistic helicopter door gunner who shoots innocent farmers and water buffalo dead for his amusement. He boasts about having a kill count over 150, mostly civilians, and suggests that Joker and Rafter Man write a story about him. Colceri, a former Marine, was originally slated to play Hartman, a role that went to Ermey. Kubrick gave Colceri this smaller part as a consolation.
- Ian Tyler as Lieutenant Cleves, an officer present at the uncovering of a mass grave.
- Gary Landon Mills as Donlon, a squad member who works as a radio operator.
- Sal Lopez as "T.H.E. Rock", a squad member.
- Papillon Soo Soo as a Da Nang prostitute
- Leanne Hong as Da Nang motorbike prostitute
- Ngọc Lê as the Viet Cong sniper.
- Peter Edmund as Private "Snowball" Brown, a recruit in Hartman's platoon who briefly becomes a squad leader before Hartman gives Joker the position.
- Antu N'Jai as a recruit.
- Steve Boucher as a recruit.
- Stanley Kubrick as Sergeant Murphy (voice only, uncredited), whom Cowboy communicates with by radio

== Themes ==
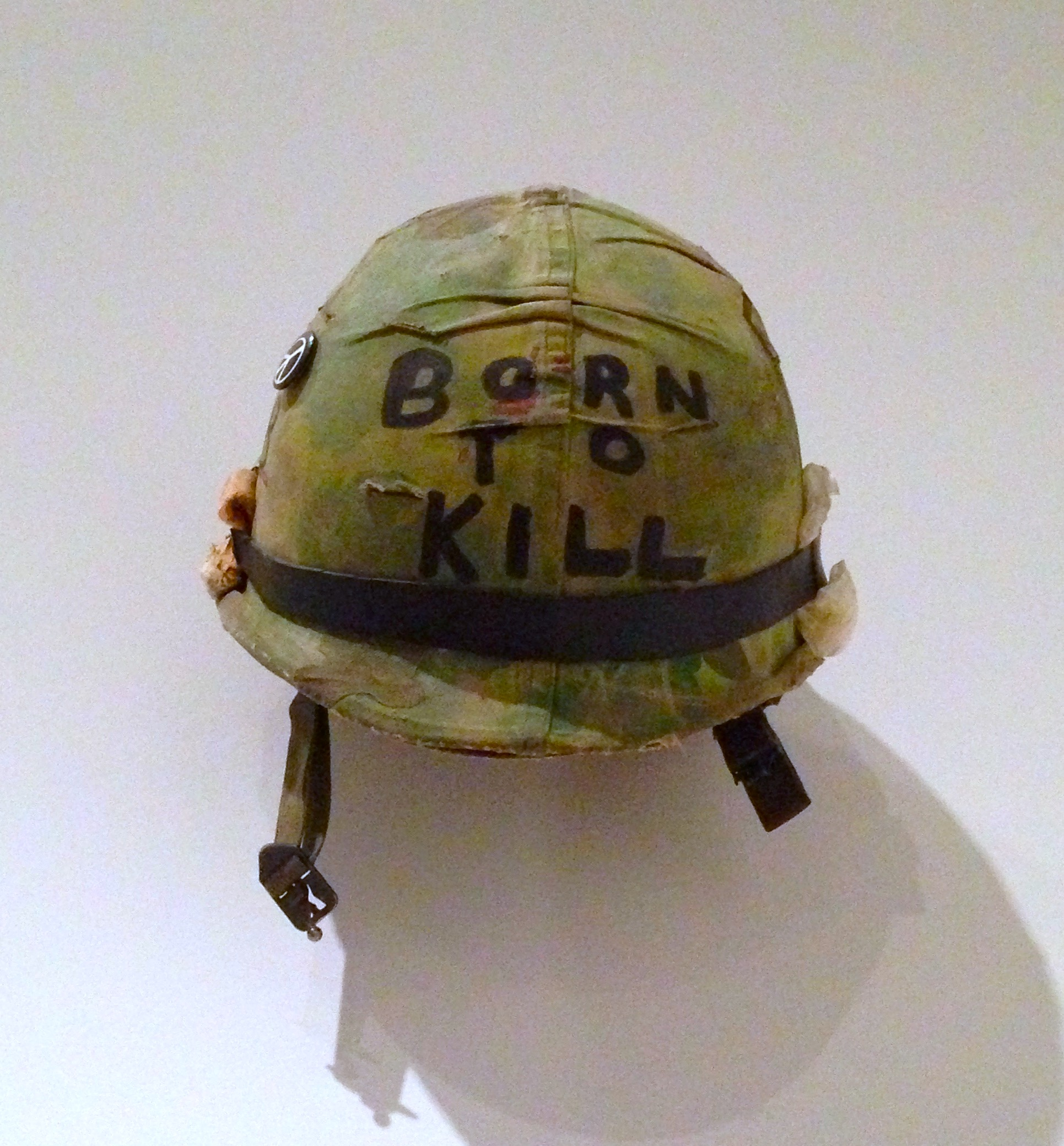
Helmet prop from the film

Michael Pursell's essay "Full Metal Jacket: The Unravelling of Patriarchy" (1988) was an early, in-depth consideration of the film's two-part structure and its criticism of masculinity. Pursell wrote that the film shows "war and pornography as facets of the same system".

Many reviewers praised the military brainwashing themes in the boot-camp portion of the film while viewing the film's second half as more confusing and disjointed. Rita Kempley of The Washington Post wrote, "it's as if they borrowed bits of every war movie to make this eclectic finale." Roger Ebert saw the film as an attempt to tell a story of individual characters and the war's effects on them. According to Ebert, the result is a shapeless film that feels "more like a book of short stories than a novel". Julian Rice, in his book Kubrick's Hope (2008), saw the second part of the film as a continuation of Joker's psychic journey in his attempt to understand human evil.

Tony Lucia, in his 1987 review of Full Metal Jacket for the Reading Eagle, examined the themes of Kubrick's career, suggesting "the unifying element may be the ordinary man dwarfed by situations too vast and imposing to handle". Lucia refers to the "military mentality" in this film and also said the theme covers "a man testing himself against his own limitations", and concluded: "Full Metal Jacket is the latest chapter in an ongoing movie which is not merely a comment on our time or a time past, but on something that reaches beyond."

British critic Gilbert Adair wrote, "Kubrick's approach to language has always been reductive and uncompromisingly deterministic in nature. He appears to view it as the exclusive product of environmental conditioning, only very marginally influenced by concepts of subjectivity and interiority, by all the whims, shades and modulations of personal expression."

Michael Herr wrote of his work on the screenplay, "The substance was single-minded, the old and always serious problem of how you put into a film or a book the living, behaving presence of what Jung called the shadow, the most accessible of archetypes, and the easiest to experience ... War is the ultimate field of Shadow-activity, where all of its other activities lead you. As they expressed it in Vietnam, 'Yea, though I walk through the Valley of the Shadow of Death, I will fear no Evil, for I am the Evil'."

== Production ==
=== Development ===
In early 1980, Stanley Kubrick contacted Michael Herr, author of the Vietnam War memoir Dispatches (1977), to discuss work on a film about the Holocaust but Kubrick discarded that idea in favor of a film about the Vietnam War. Herr and Kubrick met in England; Kubrick told Herr he wanted to make a war film but had yet to find a story to adapt. Kubrick discovered Gustav Hasford's novel The Short-Timers (1979) while reading the Kirkus Review. Herr received the novel in bound galleys and thought it a masterpiece. In 1982, Kubrick read the novel twice; he concluded it is "a unique, absolutely wonderful book" and decided to adapt it for his next film. According to Kubrick, he was drawn to the book's dialogue, which he found "almost poetic in its carved-out, stark quality". In 1983, Kubrick began researching for the film; he watched archival footage and documentaries, read Vietnamese newspapers on microfilm from the Library of Congress, and studied hundreds of photographs from the era. Initially, Herr was not interested in revisiting his Vietnam War experiences, but Kubrick spent three years persuading him, describing the discussions as "a single phone call lasting three years, with interruptions".

In 1985, Kubrick contacted Hasford and invited him to join the team; they spoke by telephone three to four times a week for hours at a time. Kubrick had already written a detailed treatment of the novel, and they met at Kubrick's home every day, breaking the treatment into scenes. Herr then wrote the first draft of the film script. Kubrick worried the audience might misread the book's title as a reference to people who did only half a day's work and changed it to Full Metal Jacket after coming across the phrase in a gun catalogue. After the first draft was complete, Kubrick telephoned his orders to Hasford and Herr, who mailed their submissions to him. Kubrick read and edited Hasford's and Herr's submissions, and the team repeated the process. Neither Hasford nor Herr knew how much each had contributed to the screenplay, which led to a dispute over the final credits. Hasford said: "We were like guys on an assembly line in the car factory. I was putting on one widget and Michael was putting on another widget and Stanley was the only one who knew that this was going to end up being a car." Herr said Kubrick was not interested in making an anti-war film but "he wanted to show what war is like".

At some point, Kubrick wanted to meet Hasford in person, but Herr advised against this, describing The Short-Timers author as a "scary man, a big, haunted marine", and did not believe Hasford and Kubrick would "get on". Kubrick, however, insisted on the meeting, which occurred at Kubrick's house in England. The meeting went poorly; Kubrick privately told Herr: "I can't deal with this man," and Hasford did not meet with Kubrick again.

=== Casting ===
Ermey's performance with improvised verbal insults was an integral part in Full Metal Jacket that received critical acclaim.

Through Warner Bros., Kubrick advertised a casting search in the United States and Canada. He used videotape to audition actors and received over 3,000 submissions. Kubrick's staff screened the tapes, leaving 800 of them for him to review.

Former U.S. Marines drill instructor R. Lee Ermey was originally hired as a technical advisor. Ermey asked Kubrick if he could audition for the role of Hartman. Kubrick, who had seen Ermey's portrayal of drill instructor Staff Sergeant Loyce in The Boys in Company C (1978), told Ermey that he was not vicious enough to play the character. Ermey improvised insulting dialogue against a group of Royal Marines who were being considered for the part of background Marines in order to demonstrate his ability to play the character and to show how a drill instructor attacks individuality in new recruits. Upon viewing the videotape of these sessions, Kubrick offered Ermey the role, realizing he "was a genius for this part". Kubrick incorporated the 250-page transcript of Ermey's rants into the script. Ermey's experience as a drill instructor during the Vietnam War proved invaluable; Kubrick estimated that Ermey wrote 50% of his character's dialogue, particularly the insults.

While Ermey practiced his lines in a rehearsal room, Kubrick's assistant Leon Vitali would throw tennis balls and oranges at him, which Ermey had to catch and throw back as quickly as possible while saying his lines as fast as he could. Any hesitation, slowdown, slip or missed line would necessitate restarting, and 20 error-free runs were required. "[He] was my drill instructor," Ermey said of Vitali.

Nine months of negotiations to cast Anthony Michael Hall as Private Joker were unsuccessful; Hall would later regret not doing the film. Val Kilmer was also considered for the role, and Bruce Willis declined a role because of commitments to his television series Moonlighting. Ed Harris declined the role of Hartman, a decision that he later called "foolish". Robert De Niro was also considered for the role, although Kubrick eventually felt that the audience would "feel cheated" if De Niro's character were killed in the first hour. Bill McKinney was also considered for the part, but Kubrick professed an irrational fear of the actor. McKinney was known for his role as a rural psychopath in 1972's Deliverance, most memorably in a sequence that Kubrick described as "the most terrifying scene ever put on film". McKinney was about to fly from Los Angeles to London to audition for Kubrick and the producers when he received a message at the airport informing him that his audition had been canceled; McKinney, however, was paid in full. Denzel Washington showed interest in the film, but Kubrick did not send him a script.

=== Filming ===
Principal photography began on August 27, 1985, and concluded on August 8, 1986. Scenes were filmed in Cambridgeshire, the Norfolk Broads, in East London at Millennium Mills and Beckton Gas Works in Newham and on the Isle of Dogs. Kubrick hired Anton Furst as the production designer, impressed by his work on The Company of Wolves (1984). Bassingbourn Barracks, a former Royal Air Force station and then a British Army base, was used as the Parris Island Marines boot camp. A British army rifle range near Barton, Cambridgeshire, was used for the scene in which Hartman congratulates Private Pyle for his shooting skills. Kubrick and Furst worked from still photographs of Huế taken in 1968. Kubrick found an area owned by British Gas that closely resembled it and was scheduled to be demolished. The disused Beckton Gas Works, a few miles from central London, was filmed to depict Huế after attacks. Kubrick had buildings demolished and the film's art director used a wrecking ball to knock holes in some of the buildings over the course of two months. Kubrick had a plastic replica jungle delivered from California, but once he saw it, he dismissed the idea, saying; "I don't like it. Get rid of it." The open country scenes were filmed at marshland in Cliffe-at-Hoo and along the River Thames. Locations were decorated with 200 palm trees imported from Spain and 100,000 plastic tropical plants from Hong Kong.

Kubrick acquired four M41 tanks from a Belgian army colonel who was an admirer of his work. Westland Wessex helicopters, which have a much longer and less-rounded nose than that of the Vietnam era H-34, were painted Marines green to represent Sikorsky H-34 Choctaw helicopters. Kubrick obtained a selection of rifles, M79 grenade launchers and M60 machine guns from a licensed weapons dealer.

Modine described the filming as difficult. Beckton Gas Works was a toxic environment for the film crew, being contaminated with asbestos and hundreds of other chemicals. During the boot camp sequence of the film, Modine and the other recruits underwent Marine Corps training, during which Ermey yelled at them for 10 hours a day while filming the Parris Island scenes. To ensure that the actors' reactions to Ermey's lines were as authentic and fresh as possible, Ermey and the recruits did not rehearse together. For film continuity, each recruit had his head shaved once a week.

Modine fought with Kubrick about whether he could leave the set to be with his pregnant wife in the delivery room. Modine threatened to cut himself and get sent to the hospital himself to force Kubrick to relent. He also nearly fought with D'Onofrio during filming the boot camp scenes after he taunted D'Onofrio while laughing with the film's extras between takes.

During filming, Ermey was injured in a car crash and broke several ribs, leaving him unavailable for four and a half months.

During Cowboy's death scene, a building that resembles the alien monolith in Kubrick's 2001: A Space Odyssey (1968) is visible. Kubrick described this as an "extraordinary accident".

During filming, Hasford contemplated legal action over the writing credits. Originally, the filmmakers intended Hasford to receive an "additional dialogue" credit, but he fought for and eventually received full credit. Hasford and two friends visited the set dressed as extras but was mistaken by a crew member for Herr. Hasford identified himself as the writer of the source material.

Kubrick's daughter Vivian, who appears uncredited as a news camera operator, shadowed the filming of Full Metal Jacket. She filmed 18 hours of behind-the-scenes footage for a potential "making-of" documentary that went unmade. Sections of her work can be seen in the documentary Stanley Kubrick's Boxes (2008).

== Music ==
Vivian Kubrick, under the alias Abigail Mead, wrote the film's score. According to an interview in the January 1988 issue of Keyboard, the film was scored mostly with a Series III edition Fairlight CMI synthesizer and a Synclavier. For the period music, Kubrick reviewed Billboard's list of the top 100 hits for each year from 1962 to 1968, considering many songs but he found that "sometimes the dynamic range of the music was too great, and we couldn't work in dialogue."

- Johnnie Wright – "Hello Vietnam"
- The Dixie Cups – "Chapel of Love"
- Sam the Sham & the Pharaohs – "Wooly Bully"
- Chris Kenner – "I Like It Like That"
- Nancy Sinatra – "These Boots Are Made for Walkin'"
- The Trashmen – "Surfin' Bird"
- Goldman Band – "Marines' Hymn"
- The Rolling Stones – "Paint It Black"

A single titled "Full Metal Jacket (I Wanna Be Your Drill Instructor)", credited to Mead and Nigel Goulding, was released to promote the film and incorporates Ermey's drill cadences from the film. The single reached number one in Ireland, number two in the UK, number four in Flanders and the Netherlands, number eight in West Germany, number 11 in Sweden, and number 29 in New Zealand.

== Release ==
Full Metal Jacket had previews in more than 100 theaters on June 19, 1987. It received a limited release on June 26, 1987, in 215 theaters in 12 cities.

=== Box office ===
During its opening weekend, it accrued $2.2 million, an average of $10,313 per theater, ranking it the number 10 film for the weekend June 26–28. It took a further $2 million for a total of $5.7 million before being widely released in 881 theaters on July 10, 1987. The weekend of July 10–12 saw the film gross $6.1 million, an average of $6,901 per theater, and rank as the second-highest-grossing film. Over the next four weeks the film opened in a further 194 theaters to its widest release of 1,075 theaters; it closed two weeks later with a total gross of $46.4 million, making it the twenty-third-highest-grossing film of 1987. By 1998, the film had grossed $120 million worldwide.

=== Home media ===
The home media release history of Full Metal Jacket is summarized in the following table. Minor cuts to the 1h 57m theatrical version were made to comply with the censor boards overseeing the various territories in which the film was released. For technical reasons the PAL mastering standard speeds up playback by around 4% compared with NTSC, leading to slightly shorter runtimes (around 1h 52m) in releases mastered for territories other than the US and Japan.

Territory	Title	Released	Publisher	Aspect Ratio	Cut	Runtime	Commentaries	Mix	Resolution	Master	Medium
USA	#3000082901	September 22, 2020	Warner Home Video	1.78:1	Theatrical	1h 56m	none	5.1, mono (192 kbit/s)	2160p	4K	Blu-ray
USA	#3000082360	September 22, 2020	Warner Home Video	1.78:1	Theatrical	1h 56m	none	5.1	2160p	4K	Blu-ray
USA	#3000083363	September 22, 2020	Warner Home Video	1.78:1	Theatrical	1h 56m	none	5.1	1080p	4K	Blu-ray
UK		September 22, 2020	Warner Home Video	1.78:1	Theatrical	1h 56m	none	5.1	2160p	4K	Blu-ray
USA	#118627	May 7, 2013	Warner Home Video	1.85:1	Theatrical	1h 56m	none	5.1	1080p	2K	Blu-ray
USA		October 16, 2012	Warner Home Video	1.78:1	Theatrical	1h 56m	none	5.1	480i	2K	DVD
USA	#201341	October 16, 2012	Warner Home Video	1.78:1	Theatrical	1h 56m	none	5.1	1080p	2K	Blu-ray
USA	#400002309	August 7, 2012	Warner Home Video	1.78:1	Theatrical	1h 57m	none	5.1	1080p	2K	Blu-ray
USA	#5000099235	May 23, 2011	Warner Home Video	1.78:1	Theatrical	1h 52m	none	5.1	1080p	2K	Blu-ray
USA	#80931	October 28, 2007	Warner Home Video	1.78:1	Theatrical		none	5.1	1080p	2K	HD-DVD
USA	#118627	October 23, 2007	Warner Home Video	1.78:1	Theatrical	1h 56m	none	5.1	1080p	2K	Blu-ray
USA	#116116	2007	Warner Home Video	1.85:1	Theatrical	1h 57m	none	5.1	480i	2K	DVD
UK	#Z1 80931		Warner Home Video	1.78:1	Theatrical		none	5.1	1080p	2K	HD-DVD
UK	#Z1 Y18626	2007	Warner Home Video	1.78:1	Theatrical		none	5.1	1080p	2K	HD-DVD
Germany	#Z1 Y18626	2007	Warner Home Video	1.78:1	Theatrical	1h 57m	none	5.1	1080p	2K	HD-DVD
USA	#116311	May 15, 2007	Warner Home Video	1.33:1	Theatrical	1h 56m	none	5.1	480i	2K	DVD
Sweden	#Z11 80931		Warner Home Video	1.78:1	Theatrical	1h 56m	none	5.1	1080p	2K	HD-DVD
Sweden	#Z11 Y18626		Warner Home Video	1.78:1	Theatrical	1h 57m	none	5.1	1080p	2K	HD-DVD
Norway	#Z12 Y18626		Warner Home Video	1.78:1	Theatrical	1h 57m	none	5.1	1080p	2K	HD-DVD
Germany	#Z5 80931		Warner Home Video	1.78:1	Theatrical	1h 56m	none	5.1	1080p	2K	HD-DVD
France	#Z7 80931	2006	Warner Home Video	1.78:1	Theatrical	1h 56m	none	5.1	1080p	2K	HD-DVD
USA		September 5, 2006	Warner Home Video	1.77:1	Theatrical	1h 57m	none	5.1	1080p	2K	Blu-ray
Japan	#WBHA-80931	November 3, 2006	Warner Home Video	1.78:1	Theatrical	1h 57m	none	5.1	1080p	2K	HD-DVD
USA	#11826	May 16, 2006	Warner Home Video	1.78:1	Theatrical		none	5.1	1080p	2K	HD-DVD
USA		November 6, 2001	Warner Home Video	1.33:1	Theatrical		none	5.1	480i	2K	DVD
USA		June 12, 2001	Warner Home Video	1.85:1	Theatrical		none	5.1	480i	2K	DVD
USA	#21154	2001	Warner Home Video	1.33:1	Theatrical	1h 56m	none	mono	240 lines	NTSC	VHS
USA		June 29, 2001	Warner Home Video	1.33:1	Theatrical	1h 56m	none	mono	480i	NTSC	DVD
France	#1176013	1995	Warner Home Video	1.33:1	Theatrical	1h 56m	none	mono	425 lines	PAL	LaserDisc
UK	#PES 11760	1993	Warner Home Video	1.33:1	Theatrical		none	mono	240 lines	NTSC	VHS
USA	#11760	1991	Warner Home Video	1.33:1	Theatrical	1h 57m	none	mono	425 lines	NTSC	LaserDisc
Finland	#WES 11760	1991	Fazer Musiikki	1.33:1	Theatrical	1h 52m	none	mono	576 lines	PAL	VHS
USA	#11760	1990	Warner Home Video	1.33:1	Theatrical	1h 57m	none	mono	425 lines	NTSC	LaserDisc
Japan	#NJL-11760	July 25, 1989	Warner Home Video	1.33:1	Theatrical	1h 57m	none	mono	425 lines	NTSC	LaserDisc
Japan	#VHP47012	1989	Warner Home Video	1.33:1	Theatrical	1h 56m	none	mono	320 lines	NTSC	VHD
USA	#11760	1988	Warner Home Video	1.33:1	Theatrical		none	mono	240 lines	NTSC	VHS
Japan	#NJV 11660	1987	Warner Home Video	1.33:1	Theatrical		none	mono	240 lines	NTSC	VHS
Australia	#PEV 11760	1987	Warner Home Video	1.33:1	Theatrical	1h 55m	none	mono	576 lines	PAL	VHS
USA		1987	Warner Home Video	1.33:1	Theatrical		none	mono	240 lines	NTSC	VHS

The 2020 4K UHD release uses a new HDR remastered native 2160p that was transferred from the original 35mm negative, which was supervised by Kubrick's personal assistant Leon Vitali. It contains the remixed audio and, for the first time since the original DVD release, the theatrical mono mix. The release was a critical success; publications praised its image and audio quality, calling the former exceptionally good and faithful to the original theatrical release, and Kubrick's vision while noting the lack of new extras and bonus content. A collector's edition box set of this 4K UHD version was released with different cover art, a replica theatrical poster of the film, a letter from director Stanley Kubrick, and a booklet about the film's production among other extras.

In 2026, it was announced that Full Metal Jacket was to be included in the Criterion Collection alongside Kubrick's entire filmography as part of a special 4K UHD Blu-Ray box set titled The Complete Kubrick. The release will feature never before seen behind the scenes footage shot by Vivian Kubrick alongside new and archival supplements. The set will be released in October 2026.

== Reception ==
=== Critical reception ===
R. Lee Ermey (pictured) was praised by critics for his performance as Hartman, leading him to win the Boston Society of Film Critics Award for Best Supporting Actor.

Review aggregator website Rotten Tomatoes retrospectively collected reviews to give the film a score of 84% based on reviews from 158 critics and an average rating of 8.5/10. The summary states; "Intense, tightly constructed, and darkly comic at times, Stanley Kubrick's Full Metal Jacket may not boast the most original of themes, but it is exceedingly effective at communicating them." Another aggregator, Metacritic, gave it a score of 78 out of 100 based on 19 reviews, which indicates a "generally favorable" response. Reviewers generally reacted favorably to the cast—Ermey in particular— and the film's first act about recruit training. Several reviews, however, were critical of the latter part of the film, which is set in Vietnam, and what was considered a "muddled" moral message in the finale.

Richard Corliss of Time called the film a "technical knockout", praising "the dialogue's wild, desperate wit; the daring in choosing a desultory skirmish to make a point about war's pointlessness," and "the fine, large performances of almost every actor", saying Ermey and D'Onofrio would receive Oscar nominations. Corliss appreciated "the Olympian elegance and precision of Kubrick's filmmaking." Empire's Ian Nathan awarded the film three stars out of five, saying it is "inconsistent" and describing it as "both powerful and frustratingly unengaged". Nathan said after the opening act, which concerns the recruit training, the film becomes "bereft of purpose"; nevertheless, he summarized his review by calling it a "hardy Kubrickian effort that warms on you with repeated viewings" and praised Ermey's "staggering performance". Vincent Canby of The New York Times called the film "harrowing, beautiful and characteristically eccentric". Canby echoed praise for Ermey, calling him "the film's stunning surprise ... he's so good—so obsessed—that you might think he wrote his own lines." (Note: As noted above, much of Ermey's dialogue in the film was indeed based on his own improvisations.) Canby said D'Onofrio's performance should be admired and described Modine as "one of the best, most adaptable young film actors of his generation", and concluded Full Metal Jacket is "a film of immense and very rare imagination".

Jim Hall, writing for Film4 in 2010, awarded the film five stars out of five and added to the praise for Ermey, saying his "performance as the foul-mouthed Hartman is justly celebrated and it's difficult to imagine the film working anything like as effectively without him." The review preferred the opening training segment to the later Vietnam sequence, calling it "far more striking than the second and longer section". Hall commented the film ends abruptly but felt "it demonstrates just how clear and precise the director's vision could be when he resisted a fatal tendency for indulgence." Hall concluded; "Full Metal Jacket ranks with Dr. Strangelove as one of Kubrick's very best." Jonathan Rosenbaum of the Chicago Reader called it "Elliptical, full of subtle inner rhymes ... and profoundly moving, this is the most tightly crafted Kubrick film since Dr. Strangelove, as well as the most horrific." Todd McCarthy in Variety called the film an "intense, schematic, superbly made" drama that is "loaded with vivid, outrageously vulgar military vernacular that contributes heavily to the film's power" but said it never develops "a particularly strong narrative". The cast performances were all labeled "exceptional"; Modine was singled out as "embodying both what it takes to survive in the war and a certain omniscience". Gilbert Adair, writing about Full Metal Jacket, commented: "Kubrick's approach to language has always been of a reductive and uncompromisingly deterministic nature. He appears to view it as the exclusive product of environmental conditioning, only very marginally influenced by concepts of subjectivity and interiority, by all whims, shades and modulations of personal expression."

Chicago Sun-Times critic Roger Ebert called Full Metal Jacket "strangely shapeless" and awarded it two and a half stars out of four. Ebert called it "one of the best-looking war movies ever made on sets and stage" but said this was not enough to compete with the "awesome reality of Platoon, Apocalypse Now and The Deer Hunter." Ebert criticized the film's Vietnam-set second act, saying the "movie disintegrates into a series of self-contained set pieces, none of them quite satisfying" and concluded the film's message is "too little and too late", having been done by other Vietnam war films. Ebert praised Ermey and D'Onofrio, saying: "These are the two best performances in the movie, which never recovers after they leave the scene." Ebert's review angered Gene Siskel on their television show At The Movies; he criticized Ebert for liking Benji the Hunted more than Full Metal Jacket. Time Out London disliked the film, saying: "Kubrick's direction is as steely cold and manipulative as the régime it depicts," and that the characters are underdeveloped, adding "we never really get to know, let alone care about, the hapless recruits on view".

Audiences polled by CinemaScore gave the film an average grade of "B+" on an A+ to F scale.

British television channel Channel 4 voted Full Metal Jacket fifth on its list of the greatest war films ever made. In 2008, Empire placed the film at number 457 on its list of "The 500 Greatest Movies of All Time." In 2010, The Guardian ranked it 19th on its list of the "25 best action and war films of all time." The film is ranked 95 on the American Film Institute's 100 Years... 100 Thrills list, which was published in 2001.

=== Accolades ===
Between 1987 and 1989, Full Metal Jacket was nominated for eleven awards, including an Academy Award for Best Adapted Screenplay, two BAFTA Awards for Best Sound and Best Special Effects, and a Golden Globe for Best Supporting Actor for Ermey. It won five awards, including three from overseas; Best Foreign Language Film from the Japanese Academy, Best Producer from the Academy of Italian Cinema, Director of the Year at the London Critics Circle Film Awards and Best Director and Best Supporting Actor at the Boston Society of Film Critics Awards for Kubrick and Ermey respectively. Of the five awards it won, four were awarded to Kubrick and the other was given to Ermey.

Year	Award	Category	Recipient	Result	Ref.
1987	BAFTA Awards	Best Sound	Nigel Galt, Edward Tise and Andy Nelson	Nominated	
1987	BAFTA Awards	Best Special Effects	John Evans	Nominated	
1988	Academy Awards	Best Adapted Screenplay	Stanley Kubrick, Michael Herr and Gustav Hasford	Nominated	
1988	Boston Society of Film Critics Awards	Best Director	Stanley Kubrick	Won	
1988	Boston Society of Film Critics Awards	Best Supporting Actor	R. Lee Ermey	Won	
1988	David di Donatello Awards	Best Producer – Foreign film	Stanley Kubrick	Won	
1988	Golden Globes	Best Supporting Actor – Motion Picture	R. Lee Ermey	Nominated	
1988	London Critics Circle Film Awards	Director of the Year	Stanley Kubrick	Won	
1988	Writers Guild of America	Best Adapted Screenplay	Stanley Kubrick, Michael Herr, Gustav Hasford	Nominated	
1989	Kinema Junpo Awards	Best Foreign Language Film Director	Stanley Kubrick	Won	
1989	Awards of the Japanese Academy	Best Foreign Language Film	Stanley Kubrick	Nominated	

== Differences between novel and screenplay ==
Film scholar Greg Jenkins has analyzed the adaptation of the novel as a screenplay. The novel is in three parts and the film greatly expands the relatively brief first section about the boot camp on Parris Island and essentially discards Part III. This gives the film a twofold structure, telling two largely independent stories that are connected by the same characters. Jenkins said this structure is a development of concepts Kubrick originally discussed in the 1960s, when he talked about wanting to explode the usual conventions of narrative structure.

Sergeant Hartman, who is renamed from the book's Gerheim, has an expanded role in the film. Private Pyle's incompetence is presented as weighing negatively on the rest of the platoon; unlike the novel, he is the only under-performing recruit. The film omits Gerheim's disclosure that he thinks Pyle might be mentally unstable—a "Section 8"—to the other troops; instead, Joker questions Pyle's mental state. In contrast, Hartman praises Pyle, saying he is "born again hard". Jenkins says that portraying Hartman as having a warmer social relationship with the troops would have upset the balance of the film, which depends on the spectacle of ordinary soldiers coming to grips with Hartman as a force of nature who embodies a killer culture.

Some scenes in the book were removed from the screenplay or conflated with others. For example, Cowboy's introduction of the "Lusthog Squad" was markedly shortened and supplemented with material from other sections of the book. Although the book's third section was largely omitted, elements from it were inserted into other parts of the film. For instance, the climactic episode with the sniper is a conflation of two sections of Parts II and III of the book. According to Jenkins, the film presents this passage more dramatically but in less gruesome detail than the novel.

The film often has a more tragic tone than the book, which relies on callous humor. In the film, Joker remains a model of humane thinking, as evidenced by his moral struggle in the sniper scene and elsewhere. Joker works to overcome his own meekness rather than compete with other Marines. The film omits Joker's eventual domination over Animal Mother shown in the book.

The film also omits Rafter Man's death; according to Jenkins, this allows viewers to reflect on Rafter Man's personal growth and speculate on his future growth after the war.

== In popular culture ==
A portion of Gunnery Sergeant Hartman's speech to the Parris Island recruits, and portions of the recruits' recitation of the Rifleman's Creed, are sampled in the Combichrist song "This Is My Rifle" from the album Everybody Hates You.

The line "Me so horny. Me love you long time," which is uttered by the Da Nang street prostitute to Joker, became a catchphrase in popular culture and was sampled by rap artists 2 Live Crew in their 1989 hit "Me So Horny" and by Sir Mix-A-Lot in "Baby Got Back" (1992). Many Asian American women have experienced instances of people quoting the line at them, which is widely considered offensive.

== See also ==
- Paths of Glory
- List of Vietnam War films

== Bibliography ==
- Baxter, John (1997). Stanley Kubrick: A Biography. Harper. ISBN 978-0-00-638445-8.
- Duncan, Paul (2003). Stanley Kubrick: The Complete Films. Taschen GmbH. ISBN 978-3836527750.
- Jenkins, Greg (1997). Stanley Kubrick and the Art of Adaptation: Three Novels, Three Films. McFarland. ISBN 978-0-7864-3097-0.
- Kubrick, S.; Herr, M.; Hasford, G. (1987). Full Metal Jacket: The Screenplay. Borzoi book. Knopf. ISBN 978-0-394-75823-7.
- Kubrick, Stanley (1987). Full Metal Jacket. Knopf. ISBN 978-0394758237.
- Modine, Matthew (2005). Full Metal Jacket Diary. Rugged Land. ISBN 978-1590710470.
