= Trần Ngọc Tám =

South Vietnamese army general (1926–2011)

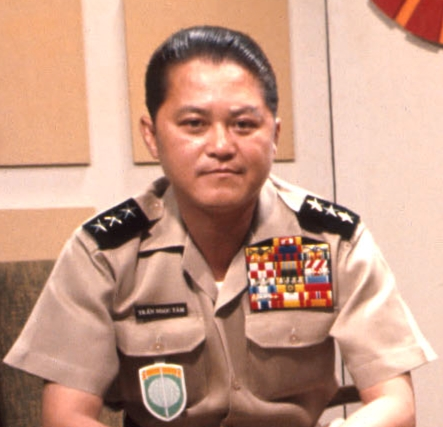
- Born: 12 March 1926
- Died: 4 August 2011 (aged 85)
- Allegiance: South Vietnam
- Branch: Vietnamese National Army; Army of the Republic of Vietnam
- Rank: Lieutenant general
- Commands: II Corps; III Corps

Lieutenant General Trần Ngọc Tám (12 March 1926 – 4 August 2011) was an officer of the Army of the Republic of Vietnam.

Tám was born on 12 March 1926.

== Military career ==
He served as the commander of II Corps, which oversaw the Central Highlands region, from 1 October 1957 until 13 August of the next year, when he was replaced by Major general Tôn Thất Đính. He was the first commander of II Corps. He served as the commander of III Corps, which oversaw the region of the country surrounding Saigon from 4 April 1964 until 12 October of the same year, when he was replaced by Major general Cao Văn Viên.

On 8 June 1964 he told his subordinate commanders that the government was losing the war. Over the past two months, the ARVN had lost 489 dead in III Corps compared to 328 VC. He blamed the officer corps' lack of aggressiveness, knowledge, and leadership for the situation.

Tám later served as Chairman of the Free World Military Assistance Organisation.

Tám died on 4 August 2011, at the age of 85.

== Honours ==
=== National honours ===
- Commander of the National Order of Vietnam
- Army Distinguished Service Order, First Class
- Air Force Distinguished Service Order, Second Class
- Navy Distinguished Service Order, First Class
- Gallantry Cross
- Hazardous Service Medal
- Wound Medal
- Armed Forces Honour Medal, First Class
- Leadership Medal, Level Unknown
- Staff Service Medal, First Class
- Training Service Medal, First Class
- Civil Actions Medal, First Class
- Good Conduct Medal, Second Class
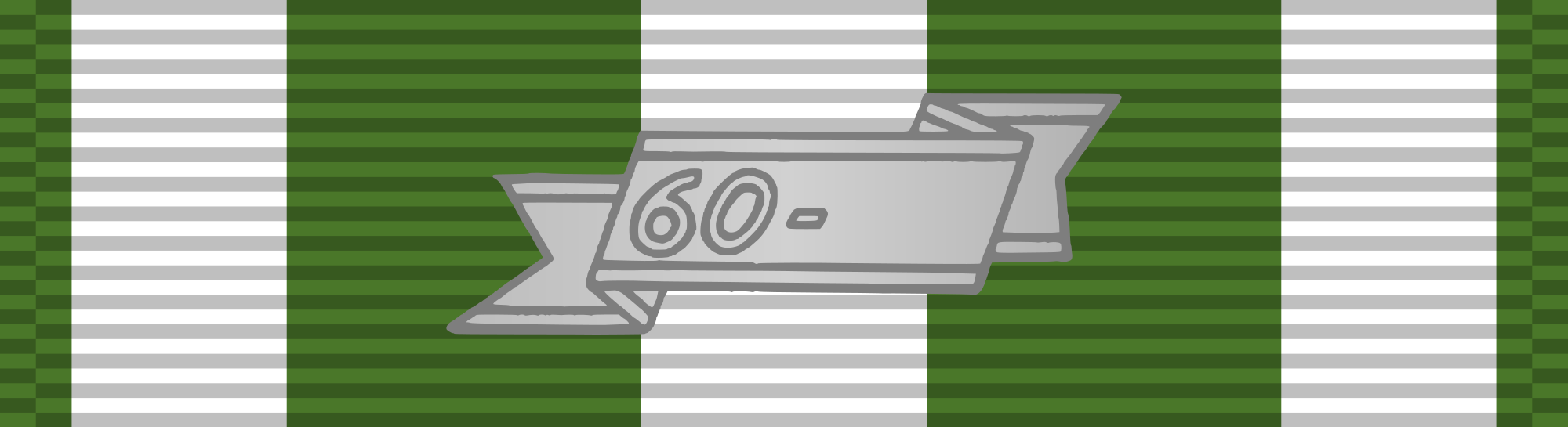
- Vietnam Campaign Medal
- Military Service Medal, Second Class
- Air Service Medal, Honour Class
- Navy Service Medal, Second class
- Chuong My Medal, First Class
- Administrative Service Medal, First Class
- Public Health Service Medal, First Class
- Social Service Medal, First Class
- Rural Revolutionary Development Medal
- Veterans Medal, First Class

=== Foreign honours ===
- France :
  - Knight of the Legion of Honour
  - War Cross for foreign operational theatres
- Philippine :
  - Commander of the Order of Sikatuna
  - Commander of the Legion of Honour
- South Korea :
  - Order of Military Merit, Eulji Cordon Medal
  - Order of National Security Merit, Gukseon Medal
- Thailand :
  - Knight Grand Cross of the Order of the Crown of Thailand
- Taiwan :
  - Grand Cordon of the Order of the Cloud and Banner
- USA :
  - Officer of the Legion of Merit
- Francoist Spain :
  - Grand Cross of the Cross of Military Merit (White Decoration)
