= Trần Văn Chơn =

Vice Admiral of the Republic of Vietnam Navy

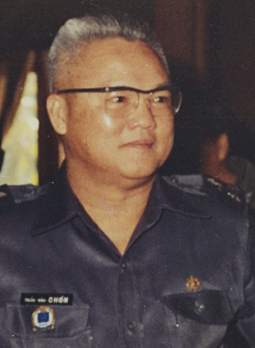
- Born: 24 September 1920; Vũng Tàu
- Died: 2 May 2019 (aged 98) San Jose, California
- Allegiance: Republic of Vietnam
- Branch: (South Vietnam) Republic of Vietnam Navy
- Service years: 1952–1974
- Rank: Vice admiral (phó đô đốc)
- Commands: Republic of Vietnam Navy (1966–1974); Republic of Vietnam Navy (1957–1959)

Trần Văn Chơn (24 September 1920 – 2 May 2019) was a Vice Admiral of the Republic of Vietnam Navy (RVNN) and commander of the RVNN from 1966 to 1974.

== Early life ==
Chơn was born on 24 September 1920 to a well-off family in Vũng Tàu, Vietnam. In 1939, he graduated from high school with a partial Baccalauréat (Part I). In 1940, he entered the French merchant shipping industry in Saigon.

== Military career ==
In late 1951, Chơn was recruited from the merchant shipping into the naval branch of the Vietnamese National Army. On 1 January 1952 he joined the first course of the Nha Trang Naval Officer training with six cadets in command and three cadets in mechanical engineering. All cadets joined the French aircraft carrier Arromanches for professional training, then rotated through the far eastern warships of the French Navy. In July 1952, his course returned to Nha Trang to continue training. On 1 October 1952 he graduated valedictorian with the rank of Second lieutenant. After graduation, Chơn was deployed to serve in the Volunteer Squadron and assigned to command 4th Airlift Center with the task of paving roads, clearing mines and patrolling.

In early October 1953, Chơn was promoted to HQ Lieutenant as deputy commander of the river assault group in Vĩnh Long. In early 1954, he was transferred north to take command of the Ninh Giang river assault group. In June of the same year, Ninh Giang group moved south, based at Mỹ Tho and renamed Mỹ Tho river assault group, commanded by Captain Le Quang My.

In 1955, with the change from the National Army naval branch to the Republic of Vietnam Navy (RVNN), Chơn was promoted to HQ Captain and appointed Assistant Commander of the Landing Craft Support Linh Kiem HQ-226. At the end of August 1955, he was appointed commander of the Giang Corps Force replacing Navy Major Le Quang My who was appointed RVNN commander.

In April 1956, Chơn was promoted to HQ Major in charge. In early 1957, he was appointed RVNN commander to replace HQ Colonel Le Quang My and he concurrently served as director of the Saigon Naval Shipyard. In mid-1958, he received orders to hand over the position of director of the shipyard to Colonel Nguyen Phat.

In June 1959, Chơn was ordered to hand over the post of RVNN commander to Lieutenant Commander Hồ Tấn Quyền. On 26 October 1959, he was promoted to Lieutenant Colonel. In early 1960, he was the first senior RVNN officer sent to the command class at the Naval War College in Newport, Rhode Island. In June 1960, he was reassigned as director of the Saigon Naval Shipyard. In early 1961, he also served as Assistant to Colonel Duong Ngoc Dau, General Director of Security and Civil Defense. In February 1962, he assumed a new assignment as Commander of the Jiang Forces (later renamed the Local Patrol League). Chơn served as deputy commander of the South Vietnamese Regional Forces and Popular Forces from 1962 until 1966.

On 1 November 1966, Chơn was promoted to Navy Colonel and reassigned as RVNN commander replacing the acting commander, ARVN Lieutenant General Cao Văn Viên. On 19 June 1968, he was promoted to the rank of Commodore, the rank of Brigadier General in office. On 1 November 1970, he was promoted to the rank of Commodore, the rank of Major General in office. On 1 November 1974, he was discharged due to his age after more than 20 years of military service. Chơn handed over the position of Commander of the Navy to his former deputy, Commodore Major General Lâm Ngươn Tánh.

== Later life ==
Following the Fall of Saigon on 30 April 1975, Chơn was imprisoned, and was held in reeducation camps until his release in September 1987.

In December 1991, Chơn and his family emigrated to the United States under the sponsorship of the former Commander Naval Forces Vietnam, Elmo Zumwalt and settled in San Jose, California.

Chơn died at his home on 2 May 2019.

== Honour ==
=== National Honours ===
- Commander of the National Order of Vietnam
- Navy Distinguished Service Order, First Class
- Gallantry Cross with palm
- Gallantry Cross Unit Citation with palm
- Navy Gallantry Cross with Gold Anchor
- Hazardous Service Medal
- Wound Medal
- Armed Forces Honor Medal, First Class
- Staff Service Medal, First Class
- Technical Service Medal, First Class
- Training Service Medal, First Class
- Good Conduct Medal, Second Class
- Vietnam Campaign Medal
- Military Service Medal, Third Class
- Chuong My Medal, First Class
- Psychological Warfare Medal, Second Class

=== Foreign Honours ===
- USA :
  - Commander of the Legion of Merit
  - Purple Heart Medal
