= Lữ Mộng Lan =

South Vietnamese general (1927–2021)

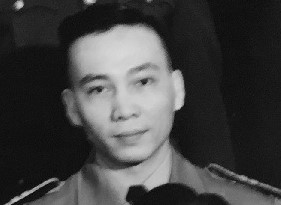
- Lữ Mộng Lan
- Born: 28 September 1927; Quảng Trị, French Indochina
- Died: 28 May 2021 (aged 93)
- Allegiance: State of Vietnam; South Vietnam
- Branch: Vietnamese National Army; Army of the Republic of Vietnam
- Service years: 1951 – 25 October 1955 (Vietnamese National Army); 26 October 1955 – 30 April 1975 (Army of the Republic of Vietnam)
- Rank: Lieutenant general
- Commands: 25th Division; 23rd Division; 10th Division; II Corps

Lữ Mộng Lan (28 September 1927 – 28 May 2021) was a Lieutenant general of the South Vietnamese Army of the Republic of Vietnam (ARVN).

== Early life and education ==
Lan was born in Quảng Trị, French Indochina on 28 September 1927. In 1944, he earned a Diplome D'Etudes Primaires Superieures Indochinoise (DEPSI), from Lycee Khai Dinh, located in Huế.

== Military career ==
Lan served as Company commander, 1951 in the Vietnamese National Army then as Deputy Battalion commander, 1952; Regimental Chief of Staff, 1954; Division Chief of Staff, 1955. In the ARVN in 1957, Lan graduated from Command and General Staff School, Fort Leavenworth. He served as Deputy Chief of Staff for Operations, Joint General Staff from 1958. He was then appointed commander of the 25th Division in 1962. He was appointed commander of the 23rd Division in 1964. He was appointed commander of the 10th Division in 1965.

By the end of 1965 the US advisers to the 10th Division regarded Lan as "moody and vacillatory" and "a marginal commander who would have to be worked with." They gave Lan high marks for his "perceptiveness and dexterity in civil affairs and troop morale" but saw his interest in local politics as too distracting. Although they found his three regimental commanders "capable and willing people," they felt that it was too early to judge if the Division was going to jell into a fighting unit. COMUSMACV General William Westmoreland predicted that combined operations with the US 1st Infantry Division and the 173rd Airborne Brigade would inspire the Division to higher standards.

From September 1966 Lan served as the deputy chief of staff for training and director of the Central Training Command.

In March 1968 Lan succeeded Nguyễn Phước Vĩnh Lộc as II Corps commander, he was not necessarily regarded as an improvement by MACV. As commander of the 25th, 23rd and 18th Divisions between 1962 and 1966, he had received poor ratings from almost all of his American advisers, he was, however, an ardent supporter of President Nguyễn Văn Thiệu and could be expected to follow the dictates of the Saigon government more closely than his predecessor.

In August 1970, Thiệu replaced Lan as II Corps commander with General Ngô Du. Lan became inspector general of the armed forces and later commandant of the National Defense College.

== Later life and death ==
Lan died in Virginia on 28 May 2021, at the age of 93.

== Awards and decorations ==
=== National honours ===
- Commander of the National Order of Vietnam
- Army Distinguished Service Order, First Class
- Air Force Distinguished Service Order, Second Class
- Navy Distinguished Service Order, Second Class
- Gallantry Cross (10 with palm, 2 with gold star, 1 with silver star, 1 with bronze star)
- Air Gallantry Cross Gold Wing Ribbon
- Hazardous Service Medal
- Leadership Medal
- Armed Forces Honor Medal, First Class
- Staff Service Medal, Second Class
- Civil Actions Medal, Second Class
- Training Service Medal, Second Class
- Good Conduct Medal, Fifth Class
- Vietnam Campaign Medal
- Military Service Medal, Fifth Class
- Chuong My Medal, First Class

=== Foreign honours ===
- Thailand :
  - Knight Commander of the Order of the White Elephant
- South Korea :
  - Order of Military Merit, Eulji Medal
