= Trần Thanh Phong =

South Vietnamese general (1926–1972)

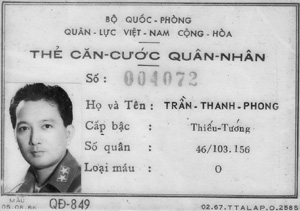
- Military ID card of General Phong
- Born: January 19, 1926; French Indochina
- Died: December 1, 1972 (aged 46) near Tuy Hoa Air Base
- Allegiance: State of Vietnam; South Vietnam
- Branch: Army of the Republic of Vietnam
- Service years: 26 October 1955 – 1 December 1972 (Army of the Republic of Vietnam)
- Rank: Major general
- Commands: I Corps

Trần Thanh Phong (19 January 1926 – 1 December 1972) was a Major general in the South Vietnamese Army of the Republic of Vietnam (ARVN).

== Military career ==
Phong served as the commander of I Corps, which oversaw the northernmost part of the country, from 20 May to 30 May 1966, when he was replaced by Lieutenant General Hoàng Xuân Lãm. He was one of five different I Corps commanders in two months, as Prime Minister Nguyễn Cao Kỳ struggled to find a leader of whom he approved while the Buddhist Uprising was taking place.

In 1967 Phong served as Director of Operations (J-3) on the Joint General Staff (JGS) and was a rival of JGS Chairman Cao Văn Viên. On 9 September following the South Vietnamese presidential election, new President Nguyễn Văn Thiệu began consolidating power and promoted Phong to JGS chief of staff.

He subsequently served as the head of the pacification program, head of the Republic of Vietnam National Police and finally as deputy commander of Military Region II.

During the 1972 Easter Offensive MR II senior advisor John Paul Vann suggested putting Phong in charge of the defense of Kontum, but Phong's sister-in-law, the wife of Prime Minister Trần Thiện Khiêm, intervened and vetoed the job as too dangerous.

He was killed on 1 December 1972 when the Republic of Vietnam Air Force plane he was travelling on crashed in bad weather on approach to Tuy Hoa Air Base. Four other South Vietnamese and two USAID officials were also killed in the crash.

== Awards and decorations ==
- South Vietnam :
  - Grand Officer of the National Order of Vietnam
  - Military Merit Medal
  - Army Distinguished Service Order, First Class
  - Air Force Meritorious Service Medal
  - Gallantry Cross
  - Hazardous Service Medal
  - Armed Forces Honor Medal, First Class
  - Vietnam Staff Service Medal, Second Class
  - Training Service Medal, First Class
  - Civil Actions Medal, First Class
  - Good Conduct Medal, First Class
  - Vietnam Campaign Medal
  - Military Service Medal, Second Class
  - Air Service Medal
  - Navy Service Medal
  - Chuong My Medal, First Class
  - Cultural and Educational Service Medal, First Class
  - Psychological Warfare Medal, First Class
- USA :
  - Bronze Star Medal with "V" device
  - Army Commendation Medal
