= Lê Nguyên Khang =

South Vietnamese general (1931–1996)

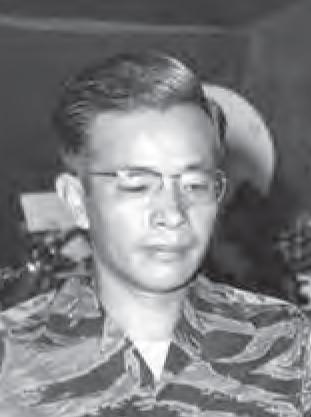
- Born: 11 June 1931; Sơn Tây, Hanoi, French Indochina
- Died: 12 November 1996 (aged 65) Orange County, Virginia or Hope, California, U.S.
- Allegiance: South Vietnam
- Branch: Republic of Vietnam Marine Division
- Rank: Lieutenant General (Trung Tướng)

Lê Nguyên Khang (11 June 1931 – 12 November 1996) was a South Vietnamese lieutenant general who commanded the South Vietnamese Marine Division.

== Early life ==
Khang was born in Sơn Tây, Hanoi, Vietnam on 11 June 1931.

== Military career ==
Khang spoke fluent English and was the first Vietnamese marine to graduate from the U.S. Marine Amphibious Warfare School at Quantico. In May 1960 President Ngo Dinh Diem appointed him as senior marine officer.

In early November 1960 Khang was commanding operations of the 1st and 2nd Marine Battalions in the Mekong Delta when he learned of the coup against Diem. Khang loaded his battalions on trucks and led them to Saigon where they joined companies of the 3rd Marine Battalion which had taken positions defending the Independence Palace.

In mid-December 1963, South Vietnam's new leaders removed Khang from his position as Commandant of the Vietnamese Marine Corps. Although he had not participated in the November coup that overthrew Diem, Khang had been a political appointee of Diem and as such was viewed as a potential threat to the new regime. After being promoted to Colonel, he was assigned to the Philippines as military attache. Lieutenant colonel Nguyen Ba Lien, who had been serving as Assistant Commandant and Chief of Staff of the VNMC, was appointed as Khang's successor, assuming command on 16 December.

The Marines together with the Airborne formed the South Vietnamese general reserve and had a significant political role to play in Saigon. Khang was allied with Air Vice Marshal Nguyễn Cao Kỳ, while General Dư Quốc Đống commanding the Airborne was an ally of Kỳ's rival General Nguyễn Văn Thiệu. The general reserve troops represented the real muscle of the Saigon-based Directory members and also constituted a balance of power between the rival officer cliques. In addition Khang commanded the Capital Military District which controlled Saigon and its environs.

In July 1965 COMUSMACV General William Westmoreland described the performance of the marines as disappointing, a problem he traced to Khang, "a poor leader [with]... influential political connections."

He was also appointed as commander of III Corps on 9 June 1966.

He was awarded the Silver Star for valor June 27 – 29, 1967 by the President of the United States, Lyndon Johnson, and was described by General Wallace M. Greene as "one of the finest field commanders in Asia."

During the Tet Offensive in early 1968 which temporarily made Saigon itself a critical battleground Westmoreland pushed for the separation of command of the Capital Military District and the appointment of a new commander. While Khang was nominal commander his deputy, Colonel Giam, controlled operations. Thiệu agreed but once again seemed willing to stick with Khang and Giam. Appearing to both fear and respect Khang, he admitted to US Ambassador Ellsworth Bunker that "unfortunately we do not have many real generals who know how to command more than a division," including, he added, himself. In early June 1968 Khang resigned his Corps command after misplaced US helicopter rocket fire killed several Kỳ supporters observing fighting in Saigon during the May Offensive. Thiệu replaced him with General Đỗ Cao Trí.

In 1972 Thiệu finally moved both Đống and Khang out of their Divisions, transferring Đống to command the Capital Military District and Khang to a nebulous "special assistant" post under General Cao Văn Viên on the Joint General Staff. Of the two, Americans considered Khang the better commander, but his past alliance with Kỳ proved a major liability.

== Death ==
According to Republic of Vietnam Marine Corps sources, Lê died in Orange County, Virginia, U.S. on 12 November 1996. However, according to noted Vietnam War historian, Spencer C. Tucker, the place of death was Hope, California.

== Awards ==
=== National honours ===
- Grand Officer of the National Order of Vietnam
- Air Force Distinguished Service Order, First Class
- Navy Distinguished Service Order, First Class
- Gallantry Cross with twenty-three Palm, with one gold star,
- Air Gallantry Cross, Gold Wing
- Hazardous Service Medal
- Armed Forces Honor Medal, First Class
- Leadership Medal
- Staff Service Medal, First Class
- Training Service Medal, First Class
- Civil Actions Medal, First Class
- Good Conduct Medal, Second Class
- Vietnam Campaign Medal with 1949–54 and 1960– devices
- Air Service Medal
- Navy Service Medal, First Class
- Chuong My Medal, First Class
- Administrative Service Medal, First Class
- Veterans Medal, First Class
- Police Honor Medal, First Class

=== Foreign Honours ===
- USA :
  - Silver Star Medal
  - Legion of Merit with "V" device
- France :
  - Croix de guerre des théâtres d'opérations extérieures
- South Korea :
  - Order of Military Merit, Eulji Medal
