= Lâm Ngươn Tánh =

Vietnamese admiral

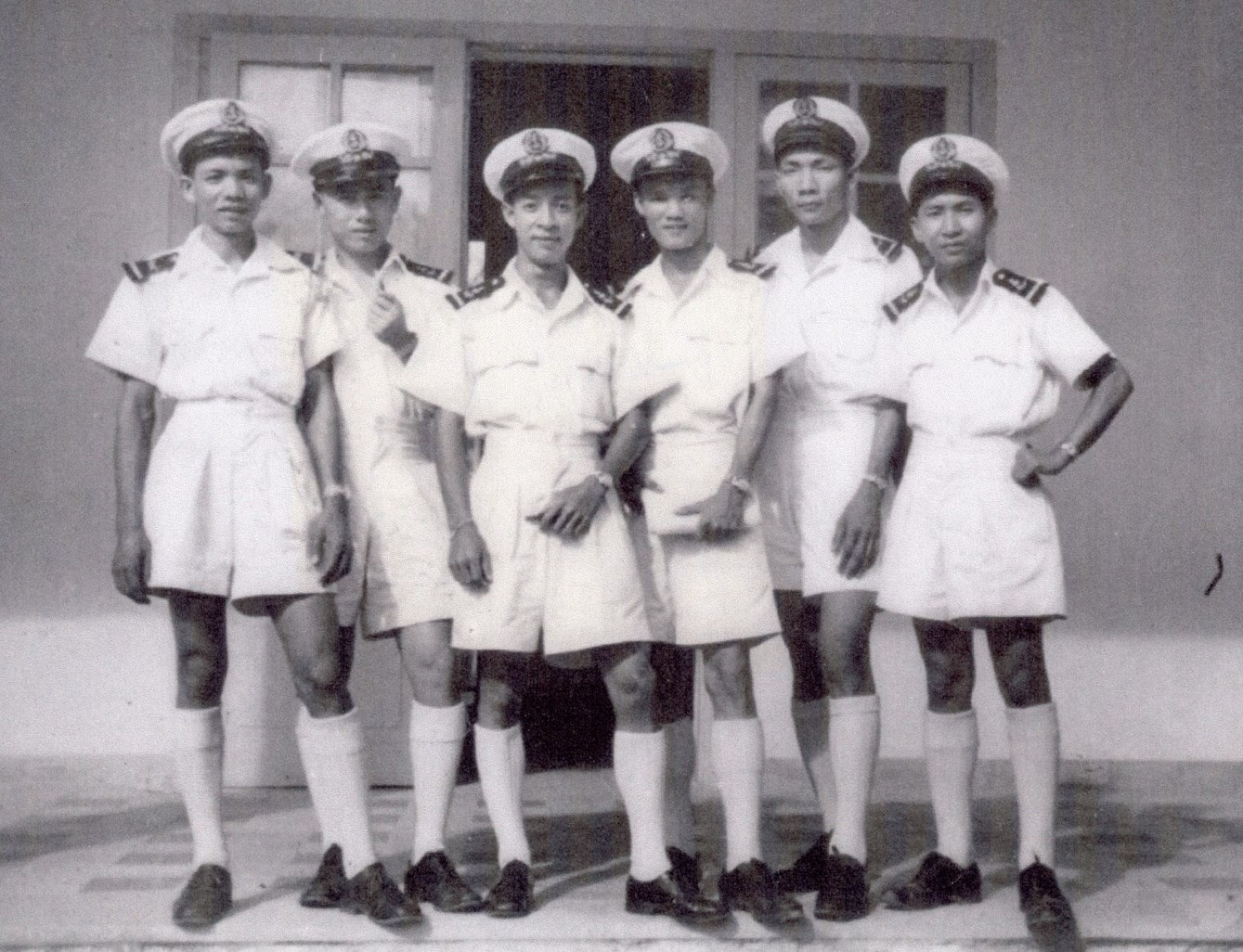
- Tánh (third from the left) in 1952
- Born: October 18, 1928; Sa Đéc, Cochinchina, French Indochina
- Died: February 11, 2018 (aged 89)
- Military career
- Allegiance: (South Vietnam) State of Vietnam; (South Vietnam) Republic of Vietnam
- Branch: Vietnamese National Army; (South Vietnam) Republic of Vietnam Navy
- Rank: Rear Admiral (Đề Đốc)
- Conflicts: Battle of Hoàng Sa
- Awards: National Order of Vietnam

Rear Admiral Lâm Ngươn Tánh (18 October 1928, in Sadec, Cochinchina – 11 February 2018) was the last Chief of Naval Operations of the Republic of Vietnam Navy during the Vietnam War.

== Biography ==
In 1974, Tánh took part in the Battle of Hoang Sa between China and South Vietnam.

Tánh gained asylum in the United States after the Fall of Saigon in April 1975 and worked as a naval architect at the Naval Surface Warfare Center, Dahlgren, Virginia. A devout Anti-Communist, he continued to work with Vietnamese exile groups.

== Highlights of naval career ==
- Saigon Merchant Marine Academy, 1948
- The Republic of Vietnam Naval Academy, 1952
- United States Naval Postgraduate School in Monterey, California, 1958
- United States Naval Shipyard Management School in Pearl Harbor, 1960
- United States Naval War College in Newport, Rhode Island, 1965
- United States National Defense Management College in Monterey, California, 1973
- Commander of RVN Navy Eastern Riverine Forces Command. 1954
- Commander of RVN Navy Sea Forces Command and Fleet Command, 1955
- RVN Navy Chief of Staff (two terms) 1963 and 1965
- Commander of RVN Naval Shore Establishments and Schools Command, 1959
- Commandant of the Saigon Naval Shipyard, 1960
- Deputy to the Deputy Chief of General Joint Chief of Staff for Navy Operations, 1965
- Commandant and Founder of the RVN Armed Forces Political Warfare College, 1965
- Vice-Chief of Naval Operations, 1970
- Chief of Naval Operations, 1975 (for over 3 months)
- His honors include the National Order of Vietnam, fourth Degree of the Republic of Vietnam.

== Activities in exile ==
In April 1975, Tánh and his wife left Vietnam after the Fall of Saigon. They eventually settled in King George, Virginia. Tánh served the U.S. Defense Department (Department of Navy) for more than 20 years as a naval architect at the Naval Surface Warfare Center in Dahlgren, Virginia.

From 1981 to 1985, Tánh was Secretary General of the Republic of Vietnam Veterans Association. From 1989 to 1991, he founded the Vietnamese Navy General Association and was the first-term Chairman. Since 1997, he has served as the Minister for Foreign Affairs of an exiled anti-communist organization The Government of Free Vietnam. In 2000, he became the Deputy Prime Minister in charge of National Defense. In August 1997, Tánh founded the Free Vietnam Coalition Party and serves on the Member Central Leadership Council. He is the founder of Vietnamese Navy General Association and First Term Chairman. In 2005, he was elected as Prime Minister of The Government of Free Vietnam.

== Awards and decorations ==
- Knight of the National Order of Vietnam
- Navy Distinguished Service Order, First Class
- Gallantry Cross with palm
- Gallantry Cross Unit Citation with Palm
- Armed Forces Honor Medal, First Class
- Leadership Medal
- Staff Service Medal, First Class
- Technical Service Medal, First Class
- Training Service Medal, First Class
- Civil Actions Medal, First Class
- Good Conduct Medal, Second Class
- Vietnam Campaign Medal
- Military Service Medal, Second Class
- Navy Service Medal, Second Class
- Dedicated Service Medal, First Class
- Psychological Warfare Medal, First Class
