= Trần Văn Minh (aviator) =

Vietnamese Air Force general and aviator (1932–1997)

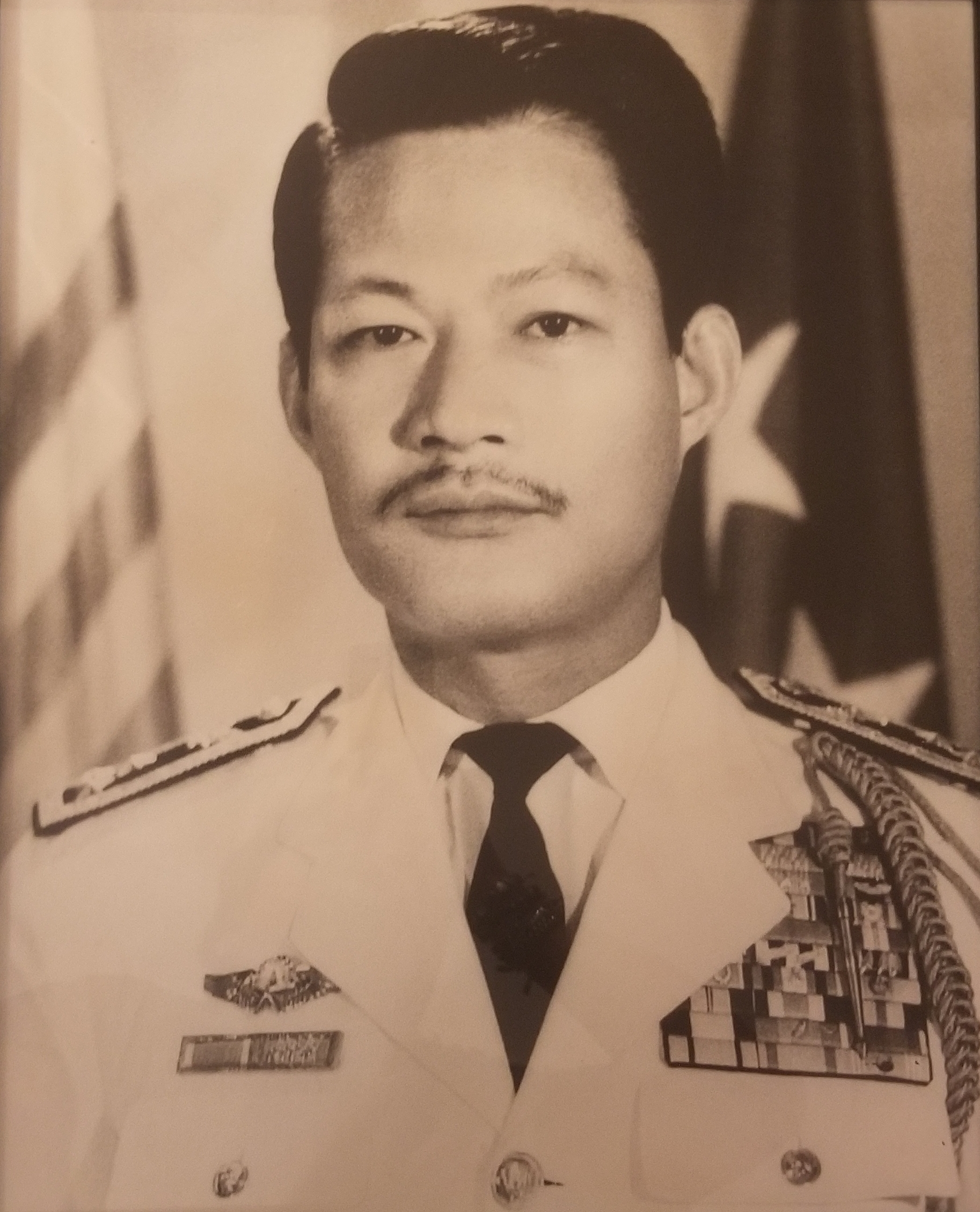
- Lieutenant General Tran Van Minh 1974 portrait
- Nickname: Minh Đen
- Born: 21 July 1932; Bạc Liêu, French Indochina
- Died: 27 August 1997 (aged 65) Los Gatos, California, U.S.
- Allegiance: South Vietnam
- Branch: Republic of Vietnam Air Force
- Rank: Lieutenant general (Trung Tướng)
- Conflicts: Fall of Saigon

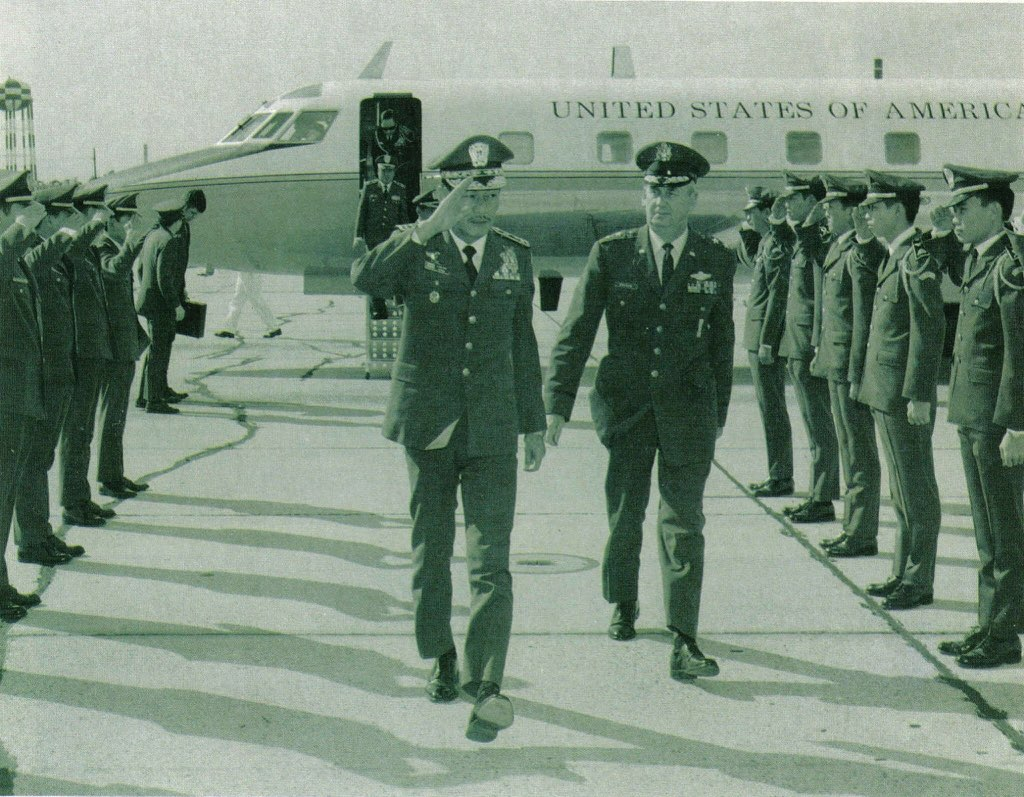
Major General Tran Van Minh in 1974

Trần Văn Minh (21 July 1932 – 27 August 1997) was the last commander of the Republic of Vietnam Air Force (VNAF).

== Career ==
In 1956 Minh was promoted to captain. In 1958 he received jet-training on the Cessna T-37 and was promoted to major. In 1960 he attended the Air Command and Staff School at Maxwell Air Force Base, Montgomery, Alabama, United States. On his return to South Vietnam he served as deputy base commander of Nha Trang Air Base, then deputy commander Bien Hoa Air Base, then Command Assistant Deputy at Danang Air Base. In 1964 he was appointed commander of the 62nd Tactical Wing at Pleiku Air Base.

In November 1967 Minh was promoted to brigadier-general and commander of the VNAF, succeeding Nguyễn Cao Kỳ who was elected as Vice-President of the Republic of Vietnam. Minh would be the longest-serving commander of the VNAF holding command from 1967 until the Fall of Saigon in April 1975. In 1968 he was promoted to major-general (Thiếu Tướng).

At 08:00 on 29 April 1975, Minh and 30 of his staff arrived at the Defense Attaché Office (DAO) compound demanding evacuation, signifying the complete loss of VNAF command and control.

== Honour ==
=== National honours ===
- South Vietnam:
  - Grand Cross of the National Order of Vietnam
  - Military Merit Medal
  - Air Force Distinguished Service Order, First Class
  - Gallantry Cross
  - Air Gallantry Cross, Bronze Wing ribbon
  - Wound Medal
  - Armed Forces Honor Medal, First Class
  - Staff Service Medal, First Class
  - Technical Service Medal, First Class
  - Training Service Medal, First Class
  - Good Conduct Medal, First Class
  - Vietnam Campaign Medal
  - Military Service Medal
  - Air Service Medal, First Class
  - Navy Service Medal, First Class
  - Chuong My Medal, First Class
  - Social Service Medal, Second Class
  - Labor Medal, Third Class
  - Rural Revolutionary Development Medal
  - Veterans Medal, First Class

=== Unit Citation ===
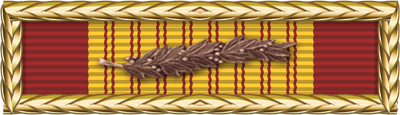
- Gallantry Cross Unit Award
- Police Honor Unit Award

=== Foreign honours ===
- Thailand :
  - Knight Grand Cross of the Order of the Crown of Thailand

Military offices
Preceded by Nguyễn Cao Kỳ	Commander Republic of Vietnam Air Force; 1967–1975	Succeeded by Nguyễn Hữu Tần
