= Đỗ Cao Trí =

South Vietnamese commander (1929–1971)

South Vietnamese Ambassador to South Korea
- In office 24 July 1967 – 9 July 1968
- Preceded by: Ngô Tôn Đạt
- Succeeded by: Đặng Ngọc Diêu (as Chargé d'affaires); Phạm Xuân Chiểu

Personal details
- Born: 20 November 1929 Biên Hòa, French Indochina
- Died: 23 February 1971 (aged 41) Tây Ninh, South Vietnam
- Cause of death: Helicopter crash

Military service
- Allegiance: Vietnamese National Army; Republic of Vietnam Military Forces
- Years of service: 1947–1971
- Rank: General (posthumous)
- Commands: Airborne Brigade (1954–1955); I Corps (1963); II Corps (1963–1964); III Corps (1968–1971)
- Battles/wars: Battle of Saigon (1955) Buddhist crisis: 1963 South Vietnamese coup d'état; Vietnam War: Operation Lam Son 719; Tet Offensive; Cambodian Campaign

Lieutenant General Đỗ Cao Trí (20 November 1929 – 23 February 1971) was a general in the Army of the Republic of Vietnam (ARVN) known for his fighting prowess and flamboyant style. Trí started out in the French Army before transferring to the Vietnamese National Army and the ARVN. Under President Ngô Đình Diệm, Trí was the commander of I Corps where he was noted for harsh crackdowns on Buddhist civil rights demonstrations against the Diệm government. Trí later participated in the November 1963 coup which resulted in the assassination of Diệm on 2 November 1963.

Years later, Trí was exiled by Nguyễn Cao Kỳ, the most powerful member of the junta, but when Nguyễn Văn Thiệu came to power, he was called back to command III Corps. He led III Corps during the 1970 Cambodian Campaign, earning the laudatory sobriquet as "the Patton of the Parrot's Beak". In 1971, Trí was ordered north to take command of I Corps in Operation Lam Son 719, an incursion into Laos, which had gone astray. He was killed, aged 41, in a helicopter accident before assuming command.

== Early years ==
Trí was born in Bình Tuoc, Biên Hòa, Đồng Nai Province, French Indochina, just northeast of Saigon. His father was a wealthy landowner and his grandfather served as a Nguyễn dynasty mandarin during the French colonial era.

He earned his baccalaureate (Part II) from Petrus Ký High School, Saigon. After entering the French colonial forces in 1947, he graduated from Do Huu Vi Officer Class and the following year was sent to Auvour, France to attend infantry school. In 1953, while an officer in the Vietnamese National Army, he graduated from General Staff and Command Class in Hanoi. His first command was as a young airborne officer, and until his death he survived three attempts on his life, leading him to his belief that he had an "immunity from death on the battlefield". As a young lieutenant colonel, he was made the commander of the Airborne Brigade in 1954 and was based in Saigon. Towards the end of the May 1955 Battle for Saigon, in which Prime Minister Diệm asserted his rule over the State of Vietnam by defeating the Bình Xuyên organised crime syndicate, some of Diệm's supporters tried to move against some generals whom they accused of questionable loyalty. When he heard that three top generals, including Nguyễn Văn Vy, were being detained in the palace by one of the factions backing Prime Minister Diệm, Trí telephoned and threatened them: "Free the generals in one half-hour or I will destroy the palace and everything inside it."

In 1958, he attended the United States Command and General Staff College at Fort Leavenworth, Kansas. That same year he graduated from Air-Ground Operations School at Fort Kisler, Washington.

== Buddhist crisis ==
During the Buddhist crisis of 1963, Trí garnered considerable notoriety for his crackdown on Buddhist protests against the Diệm regime in the central region of Vietnam. In Huế, demonstrations were banned and Trí's forces were ordered to arrest those who engaged in civil disobedience. At 13:00 on 3 June, some 1,500 protestors attempted to march towards the Từ Đàm Pagoda in Huế for a rally, having gathered at Bến Ngự bridge near the Perfume River. A confrontation ensued when the protestors attempted to cross the bridge. Six waves of ARVN tear gas and attack dogs failed to disperse the crowd. At 18:30, military personnel at the scene dispersed the crowd by emptying vials of brownish-red liquid on the heads of praying protestors, resulting in 67 Buddhists being hospitalised for chemical injuries. The symptoms consisted of severe blistering of the skin and respiratory ailments. By midnight, tensions were high as curfews and martial law were enacted. Rumours circulated that three people had been killed. Newsweek reported the police had lobbed blister gas into the crowd. The incident raised concerns among the Americans that poison gas was used, and the U.S. threatened to publicly condemn and distance itself from Saigon. An investigation, however, cleared the troops of using blister or poison gas.

The main raids in Saigon were accompanied by attacks across the country. Under Trí, the violence was worse in Huế than in the capital. The approach of Trí's forces was met by the beating of Buddhist drums and cymbals to alert the populace. The townsfolk left their homes in the middle of the night in an attempt to defend the city's pagodas. At the Từ Đàm Pagoda, which was the base of leading Buddhist activist leader, Thích Trí Quang, Monks tried to cremate as per their custom the coffin of their colleague who had self-immolated. ARVN soldiers, firing M1 rifles, overran the pagoda and confiscated the coffin. They demolished a statue of Gautama Buddha and looted and vandalized the pagoda before detonating explosives and leveling much of the pagoda. A number of Buddhists were shot or clubbed to death.

The most determined resistance occurred outside the Diệu Đế Pagoda in Huế. As troops attempted to erect a barricade across the bridge leading to the pagoda, the crowd fought the heavily armed military personnel with rocks, sticks and their bare fists, throwing back the tear gas grenades that were aimed at them. After a five-hour battle, the military finally took the bridge at dawn by driving armored cars through the angry crowd. The defense of the bridge and Diệu Đế left an estimated 30 dead and 200 wounded. Ten truckloads of bridge defenders were taken to jail and an estimated 500 people were arrested in the city. Seventeen of the 47 professors at Huế University, who had resigned earlier in the week in protest after the firing of the school's rector, Father Cao Văn Luân, a Catholic priest and opponent of Diệm's brother Archbishop Pierre Martin Ngô Đình Thục, were also arrested. Despite his vigorous application of Diệm's military policies against Buddhists in central Vietnam, where in the words of Ellen Hammer, Trí "ruled...with an iron hand", he was still involved in plotting against the regime even before the attacks on the pagodas.

== Coup against Diệm ==
When Trí was informed that coup was imminent, he left Huế on 29 October 1963 for Đà Nẵng, so he would be away from Ngô Đình Cẩn, Diệm's younger brother, who ruled central Vietnam from for the Ngô family. The coup took place on 1 November with Trí helping by causing diversions. He scheduled a meeting with the province chief and other pro-Diệm officials during the time that the coup was to take place. As a result, the Diệm loyalists were stuck in a meeting room and were unable to mobilize the Republican Youth and other Ngô family paramilitary and activist groups. After the coup, angry crowds surrounded the Ngô family home where Cẩn and his elderly mother lived. It was agreed they would be given safe passage out of the country by the junta. Trí told Cẩn he would be safe and would be taken out to Saigon, where it would be safer. Trí could only promise safe passage on an American plane to the capital, where embassy officials would meet Cẩn who wanted asylum in Japan. The Americans handed Cẩn over to the junta, and he was executed in 1964.

Following the arrest and assassination of Diệm in early November 1963, there was pressure on the new regime to remove Diệm supporters from power. Prime Minister Thơ's approach to removing Diệm supporters from positions of influence drew criticism. Some felt that he was not vigorous enough in removing pro-Diệm elements from authority, but pro-Diệm elements opposed the turnover, some claiming it was excessive and vengeful. One contentious non-removal was Trí, who had gained notoriety for his anti-Buddhist crackdowns in the central region around Huế. He was transferred to the II Corps in the Central Highlands directly south of the I Corps region.

== Conflict with Kỳ ==
Trí lived lavishly and flamboyantly, leading to suspicions of corruption. In 1965, he tried to kill himself during a government investigation. One of the main forces behind the inquiry was then-Prime Minister Nguyễn Cao Kỳ, then head of the air force and the leading figure in the ruling military junta. The pair became bitter rivals, and Kỳ sent Trí into exile. In 1967, General Nguyễn Văn Thiệu became president and Kỳ became his deputy. Thiệu sent Trí to South Korea as Vietnam's ambassador.

The power struggle between Thiệu and Kỳ played to Trí's advantage. At the time of the communists' Tet Offensive, Thieu was out of the capital, celebrating the lunar new year in the Mekong Delta. Kỳ, who was still in Saigon, stepped into the spotlight, organizing military forces against the Việt Cộng, who were temporarily repelled. Kỳ's strained relations with Thiệu led the Americans to pressure Thiệu to give Kỳ more responsibility, but Thiệu refused.

Thiệu's regime became more pro-active, declaring martial law, widening conscription, and organising token anti-corruption campaigns were carried out. Thiệu used the threat of the Việt Cộng to increase his political power, arresting, exiling or relieving senior officers who supported Kỳ.

== Return to command ==
Thiệu recalled Trí from South Korea and made him Commander of III Corps, which surrounded the capital Saigon and was crucial in blocking or orchestrating coups. Trí replaced Lieutenant General Lê Nguyên Khang, a prominent Kỳ supporter. Thiệu gave orders directly to his supporters in senior positions, bypassing Trí's own superior, Cao Văn Viên. According to Creighton Abrams, the head of U.S. forces in Vietnam at the time, "Tri has dinner with the President once or twice a week. He gets operational approval, that sort of thing, and Viên's not in on that". Although Trí and Kỳ often crossed paths at official functions thereafter, they never shook hands.

Trí was accused of involvement in a money-smuggling ring at the same time of his successful campaign in Cambodia in 1970. At the time, he lived in a spacious villa equipped with a swimming pool in Biên Hòa. He was known for his flamboyant style, wearing a camouflage jungle suit, a black three-starred cap to indicate his rank, carrying a snub-nosed Smith & Wesson .38 handgun, and was always seen with a swagger stick, quipping "I use it to spank the Viet Cong". As a lieutenant general, he performed brilliantly as commander of III Corps during the 1970 Cambodian Campaign, earning a laudatory sobriquet from the United States news media as "the Patton of the Parrot's Beak".

In late February 1971 Trí was ordered north to take command of beleaguered I Corps forces after Operation Lam Son 719, a 1971 incursion into Laos, had gone astray due to the incompetent leadership of Lieutenant General Hoàng Xuân Lãm. On 23 February 1971 Trí's command helicopter crashed shortly after takeoff from Trang Lon airstrip, Tây Ninh province, killing all onboard (other than photojournalist François Sully who died of his wounds several hours later at Long Binh US Military Field Hospital) and he was interred at Biên Hoa Military Cemetery.

== Awards and decorations ==
- South Vietnam :
  - Knight Grand Cross of the National Order of Vietnam
  - Army Distinguished Service Order, First Class
  - Gallantry Cross
  - Training Service Medal, First Class
  - Civil Actions Medal, First Class
  - Staff Service Medal, First Class
  - Administrative Service Medal, First Class
  - Psychological Warfare Medal
- Taiwan :
  - Order of the Yun Hui, First Class
- Thailand :
  - Knight Commander of the Order of the White Elephant
- USA
  - Silver Star Medal
- France :
  - Legion of Honour

== Sources ==
- Dommen, Arthur J. (2001). The Indochinese Experience of the French and the Americans: Nationalism and Communism in Cambodia, Laos, and Vietnam. Bloomington, Indiana: Indiana University Press. ISBN 0-253-33854-9.
- Dougan, Clark; Weiss, Stephen; et al. (1983). Nineteen Sixty-Eight. Boston, Massachusetts: Boston Publishing Company. ISBN 0-939526-06-9.
- Halberstam, David; Singal, Daniel J. (2008). The Making of a Quagmire: America and Vietnam during the Kennedy Era. Lanham, Maryland: Rowman & Littlefield. ISBN 978-0-7425-6007-9.
- Hammer, Ellen J. (1987). A Death in November: America in Vietnam, 1963. New York City: E. P. Dutton. ISBN 0-525-24210-4.
- Hoang Ngoc Lung (1978). The General Offensives of 1968–69. McLean, Virginia: General Research Corporation.
- Jacobs, Seth (2006). Cold War Mandarin: Ngo Dinh Diem and the Origins of America's War in Vietnam, 1950–1963. Lanham, Maryland: Rowman & Littlefield. ISBN 0-7425-4447-8.
- Jones, Howard (2003). Death of a Generation: how the assassinations of Diem and JFK prolonged the Vietnam War. New York City: Oxford University Press. ISBN 0-19-505286-2.
- Shaplen, Robert (1966). The lost revolution: Vietnam 1945–1965. London: André Deutsch.
- Sorley, Lewis (1999). A Better War: The Unexamined Victories and Final Tragedy of America's Last Years in Vietnam. New York City: Harvest Books. ISBN 0-15-601309-6.
