= Lewis Millett =

United States Army Medal of Honor recipient

Lewis L. Millett
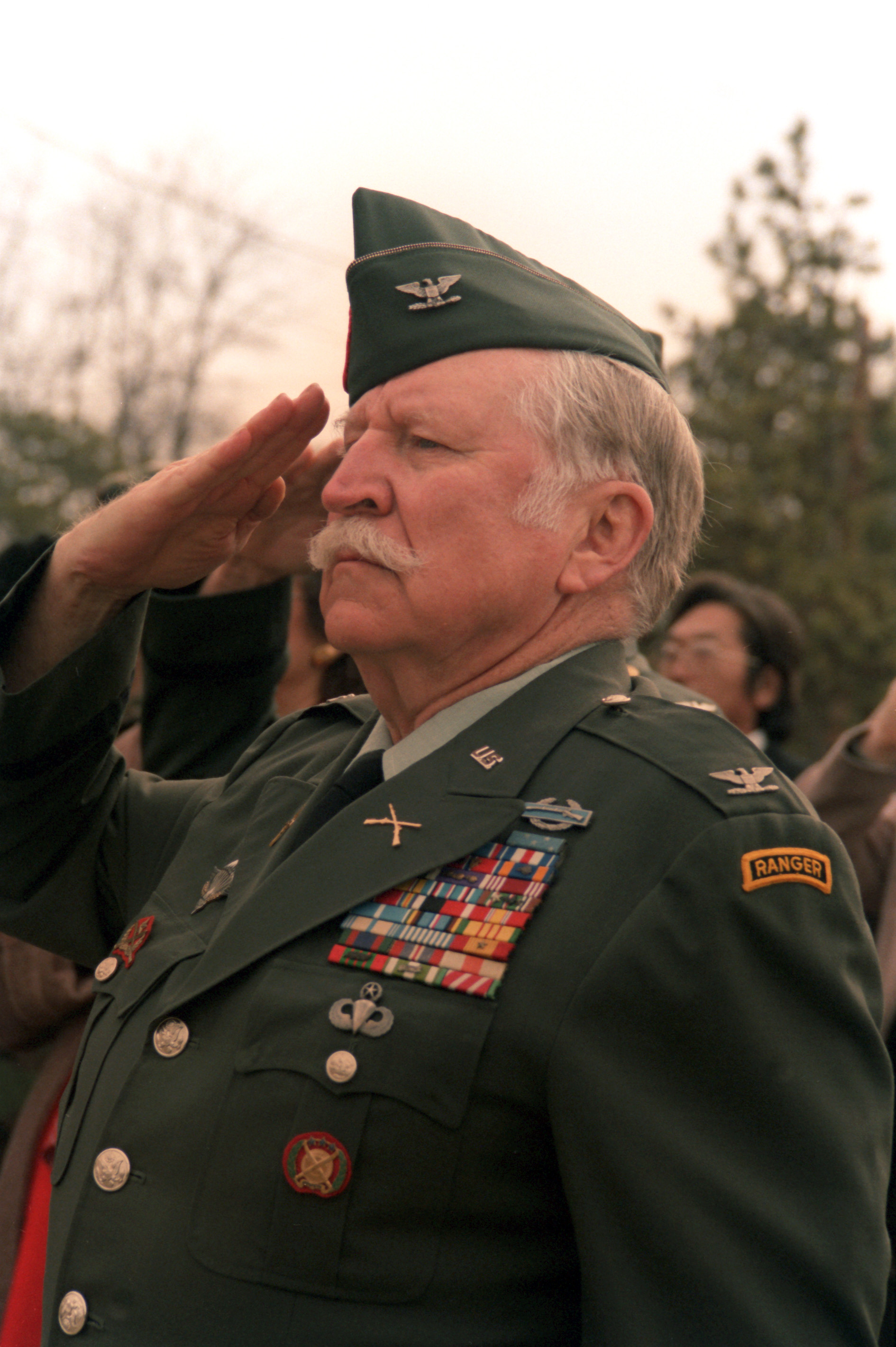
- Millett in 1985
- Born: December 15, 1920; Mechanic Falls, Maine, U.S.
- Died: November 14, 2009 (aged 88); Loma Linda, California, U.S.
- Burial place: Riverside National Cemetery
- Military career
- Allegiance: United States; Canada
- Branch: Army National Guard; United States Army Air Corps; Canadian Army; United States Army
- Service years: 1938–1940 (National Guard); 1940–1941 (Army Air Corps); 1941–1942 (Canadian Army); 1942–1973 (U.S. Army)
- Rank: Colonel
- Units: 27th Infantry Regiment; 25th Infantry Division; 27th Armored Field Artillery Regiment; 1st Armored Division
- Conflicts: World War II; Korean War; Vietnam War
- Awards: Medal of Honor; Distinguished Service Cross; Silver Star; Legion of Merit (2); Bronze Star Medal (3); Purple Heart (4); Air Medal (2)

Lewis Lee Millett Sr. (December 15, 1920 – November 14, 2009) was a United States Army officer who was awarded the Medal of Honor during the Korean War for leading the last major American bayonet charge.

He enlisted in the United States National Guard while still in high school and then in 1940 joined the United States Army Air Corps. When he thought that the United States would not participate in World War II, he deserted and went to Canada with a friend where they joined the Canadian Army and were sent to London. He served briefly with the Canadian Forces in London but soon transferred to the United States Army, which had since joined the war. While serving with the army in World War II, he received a Silver Star for driving a burning ammunition truck away from a group of soldiers before it exploded. He later served in the Vietnam War and retired from the army in 1973. He died of congestive heart failure in 2009.

== Early life ==
Millett was born on December 15, 1920, in Mechanic Falls, Maine. He grew up in South Dartmouth, Massachusetts, having moved there with his mother after his parents divorced and his mother remarried. His grandfather had served in the American Civil War and an uncle fought in World War I with the 101st Field Artillery Regiment of the Massachusetts Army National Guard.

== World War II ==
While still attending high school in Dartmouth, he enlisted in the Massachusetts National Guard in 1938 and joined his uncle's old regiment, the 101st Field Artillery. In 1940, he joined the United States Army Air Corps and entered gunnery school. When it appeared that the U.S. would not enter World War II, Millett, eager to fight, deserted in mid-1941. With a friend who had received a bad conduct discharge from the U.S. Marine Corps, Millett hitchhiked to Canada and enlisted in the Canadian Army. Assigned to the Royal Regiment of Canadian Artillery, he was sent to the United Kingdom, where he served as an anti-aircraft radar operator in London during the Blitz. Once the U.S. had entered the war, Millett transferred to the U.S. Army in 1942.

Assigned to the 27th Armored Field Artillery Regiment, 1st Armored Division, Millett served in Tunisia as an anti-tank gunner during Operation Torch. During an engagement there, he drove a burning ammunition-filled half-track away from Allied soldiers, jumping to safety just before it exploded. For this action, he was awarded the U.S. military's third-highest decoration, the Silver Star. He later shot down a Messerschmitt Bf 109 fighter plane using half-track mounted machine guns.

Millett, by then a sergeant, next took part in the Allied invasion of Italy and fought in the Battle of Salerno and the subsequent Battle of Anzio. It was at this time that the U.S. Army discovered Millet's 1941 desertion; he was court-martialed, convicted, ordered to pay a US$52 fine (roughly $983.39 in 2026) and stripped of his leave privileges. Only weeks later, he was given a battlefield commission to second lieutenant.

== Korean War ==
After World War II, Millett attended Bates College in Lewiston, Maine, for three years before being called up to serve in the Korean War.

On 5 December 1950 Millett was flying as an observer in a Stinson L-5 Sentinel when Captain J.F.O. Davis, No. 2 Squadron SAAF attached to 18 Fighter Bomber Wing, crash landed his F-51D Mustang in North Korea. The pilot of the L-5 landed on a road near the downed Mustang and Millett gave up his seat to Capt Davis. This was an outstanding act of bravery as the area was surrounded by enemy troops. When the pilot of the L-5 returned to the scene, no trace of Millett could be found. Just before dark the L-5 returned, found and picked Millet up.

By February 7, 1951, Millett was serving in South Korea as a captain and commander of Company E of the 2nd Battalion, 27th Infantry Regiment. On that day, near Soam-Ni, he led his company in an assault on an enemy position atop Hill 180 near Songtan or Anyang. When one platoon became pinned down by heavy fire, Millett took another platoon forward, joined the two groups, and led them up the hill. Wielding his bayonet and throwing hand grenades, Millett yelled encouragement to his soldiers throughout the hand-to-hand fight. Upon reaching the top of the hill, his men stormed the enemy position and forced the opposing soldiers to withdraw. Although wounded in the shin by grenade fragments, Millett refused to be evacuated until the position was secured. Historian S.L.A. Marshall described the attack as "the most complete bayonet charge by American troops since the Battle of Cold Harbor". Out of about 50 enemy dead, roughly 20 were found to have been killed by bayonets, and the location subsequently became known as Bayonet Hill.

For his leadership during the assault, Millett was awarded the Medal of Honor. The medal was formally presented to him by President Harry S Truman in July 1951.

== Vietnam War ==
After the Korean War, Millett attended Ranger School at Fort Benning, Georgia. He served in the 101st Airborne Division as an intelligence officer and later served in the Vietnam War as a military advisor to the controversial Phoenix Program, which aimed to root out and kill Viet Cong sympathizers. While at the 101st Airborne in 1959 he was the commander of the first "Recondo" (reconnaissance–commando) school which trained NCOs in small unit tactics and patrolling skills. In the mid-1960s, he commanded the Army Security Agency training center at Fort Devens, Massachusetts. In 1963, he earned a Bachelor of Arts degree in political science from Park College (now known as Park University) in Missouri.

Millett retired from the military in 1973 at the rank of colonel. He later stated that he retired because he felt the U.S. had "quit" in Vietnam.

== Later years and family ==
After his military career, Millett served as a deputy sheriff in Trenton, Tennessee. He eventually moved to Idyllwild, California, where he would remain for the rest of his life. He regularly appeared at events celebrating veterans, both in the Riverside County area and elsewhere around the country. He was a member of the Congressional Medal of Honor Society and the California Commandery of the Military Order of Foreign Wars.

Millett's first marriage, to Virginia Young, ended in divorce. During the festivities surrounding his Medal of Honor award in 1951, he met Winona Williams. They later married and had four children: Lewis Lee Jr., Timothy, John, and Elizabeth. By the time of Winona Millett's death in 1993, the couple had been married over 40 years. Millett's son John, an Army staff sergeant, was among more than 240 U.S. military members killed in 1985 when their airplane, Arrow Air Flight 1285, crashed in Gander, Newfoundland, while carrying them home from peacekeeping duty in the Sinai Peninsula.

Millett died of congestive heart failure on November 14, 2009, one month short of his 89th birthday. He died at the Jerry L. Pettis Memorial VA Medical Center in Loma Linda, California, after being hospitalized four days earlier. He had experienced various health problems over the last few years of his life, including diabetes. His funeral was held December 5, 2009 at Riverside National Cemetery in Riverside, California and his grave can be found in section 2, grave #1910.

== Medal of Honor citation ==
Millett's official Medal of Honor citation reads:

Capt. Millett, Company E, distinguished himself by conspicuous gallantry and intrepidity above and beyond the call of duty in action. While personally leading his company in an attack against a strongly held position he noted that the 1st Platoon was pinned down by small-arms, automatic, and antitank fire. Capt. Millett ordered the 3d Platoon forward, placed himself at the head of the 2 platoons, and, with fixed bayonet, led the assault up the fire-swept hill. In the fierce charge Capt. Millett bayoneted 2 enemy soldiers and boldly continued on, throwing grenades, clubbing and bayoneting the enemy, while urging his men forward by shouting encouragement. Despite vicious opposing fire, the whirlwind hand-to-hand assault carried to the crest of the hill. His dauntless leadership and personal courage so inspired his men that they stormed into the hostile position and used their bayonets with such lethal effect that the enemy fled in wild disorder. During this fierce onslaught Capt. Millett was wounded by grenade fragments but refused evacuation until the objective was taken and firmly secured. The superb leadership, conspicuous courage, and consummate devotion to duty demonstrated by Capt. Millett were directly responsible for the successful accomplishment of a hazardous mission and reflect the highest credit on himself and the heroic traditions of the military service.

== Awards and Decorations ==
Colonel Millet was awarded the following awards for his service

Badge	Combat Infantryman Badge with star denoting 2nd award		
1st row	Medal of Honor		Distinguished Service Cross
2nd row	Silver Star	Legion of Merit with 1 Oak leaf cluster	Bronze Star Medal with "V" Device and 2 Oak leaf clusters
3rd row	Purple Heart with 3 Oak leaf clusters	Air Medal with 2 Oak leaf clusters	Army Commendation Medal
4th row	Army Good Conduct Medal	American Defense Service Medal	American Campaign Medal
5th row	European-African-Middle Eastern Campaign Medal with Arrowhead Device and 7 Campaign stars	World War II Victory Medal	Army of Occupation Medal
6th row	National Defense Service Medal with 1 Oak leaf cluster	Korean Service Medal with 5 Campaign stars	Armed Forces Expeditionary Medal
7th row	Vietnam Service Medal with 5 Campaign stars	Armed Forces Reserve Medal	Republic of Vietnam Gallantry Cross with bronze star
8th row	United Nations Service Medal Korea	Vietnam Campaign Medal	Korean War Service Medal Retroactively Awarded, 2003
Badge	Master Parachutist Badge		
Tab	Ranger Tab		
Unit Awards	Presidential Unit Citation with 3 Oak leaf clusters	Korean Presidential Unit Citation	RVN Gallantry Cross Unit Citation with Palm

Patches

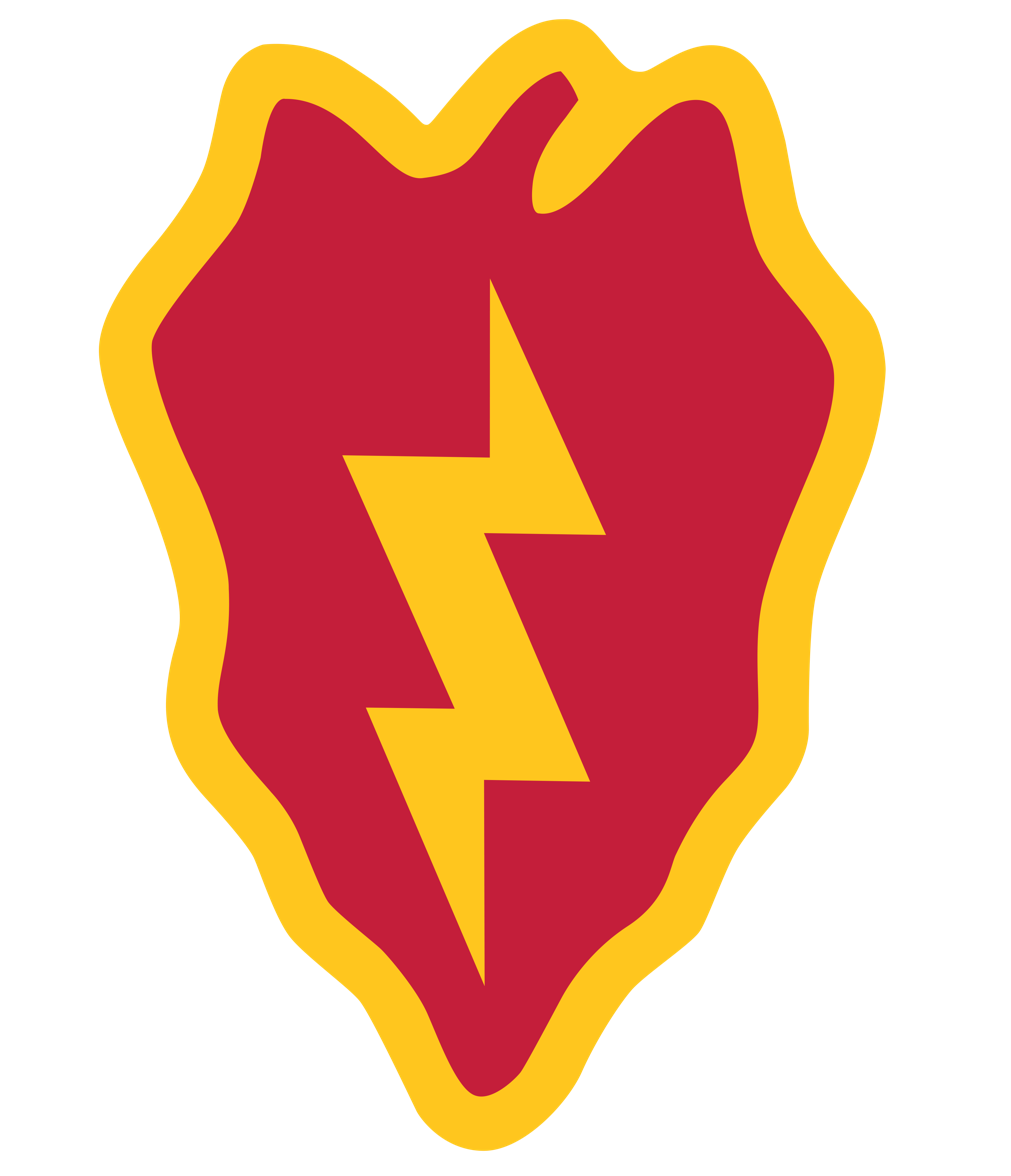

1st Armored Division Insignia	25th Infantry Division Insignia	101st Airborne Division Insignia

Foreign Awards

Canadian Volunteer Service Medal with Overseas Service Clasp	War Medal 1939-1945	Croix de Guerre with Palm
RVN Technical Service Medal 1st Class	Armed Forces Honor Medal 1st Class	RVN Staff Service Medal 1st Class

== Other honors ==
At Osan Air Base in South Korea, "Millett Road" is named after Colonel Millett. It runs up Hill 180, where the Battle of Bayonet Hill / Hill 180 Memorial is located. An annual memorial ceremony is hosted at this site under the lead of the US Army 35th Air Defense Artillery Brigade and the Colonel Lewis L. Millett Hill 180 Memorial VFW (Veterans of Foreign War) Post 8180. This hill was previously believed to be the location of where he led the legendary bayonet charge. Additional research supports that the location of the battle was actually north of Suwon, near Anyang.

A Golden Palm Star on the Palm Springs Walk of Stars was dedicated to Millet for Veterans Day in 1999, recognizing him as one of five Medal of Honor recipients from the Southern California desert area.

In 2009, a park in San Jacinto, California, was named in honor of Millett.

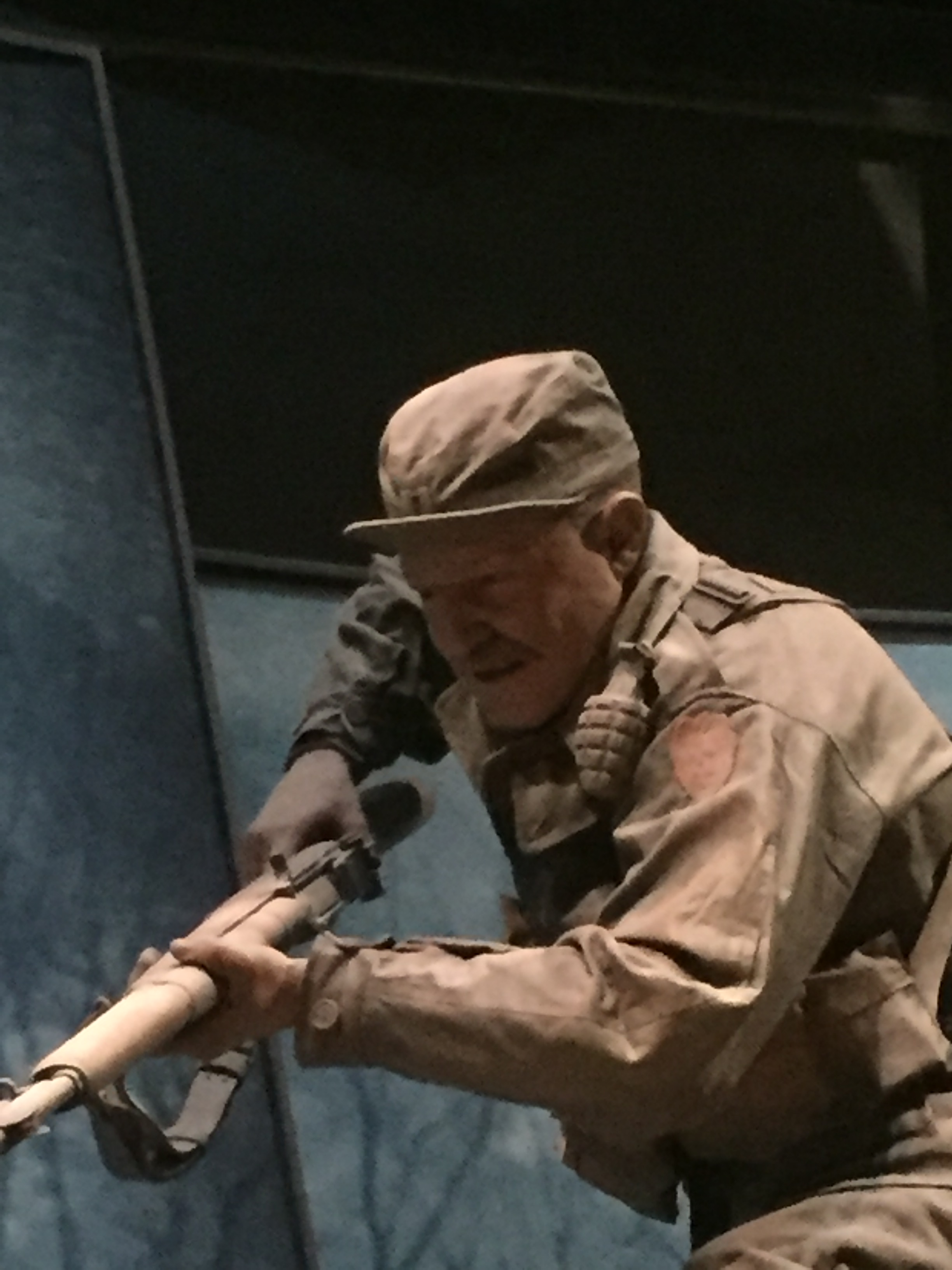
Close up of Millett at the life size diorama at the National Infantry Museum, Ft. Benning, GA.

At the US Army Infantry Museum at Fort Benning, Georgia, one of the life size dioramas depicting notable Infantry actions is of Millett's bayonet charge up Hill 180 during the Korean War. Millett is clearly visible leading the charge preparing to bayonet a North Korean soldier.

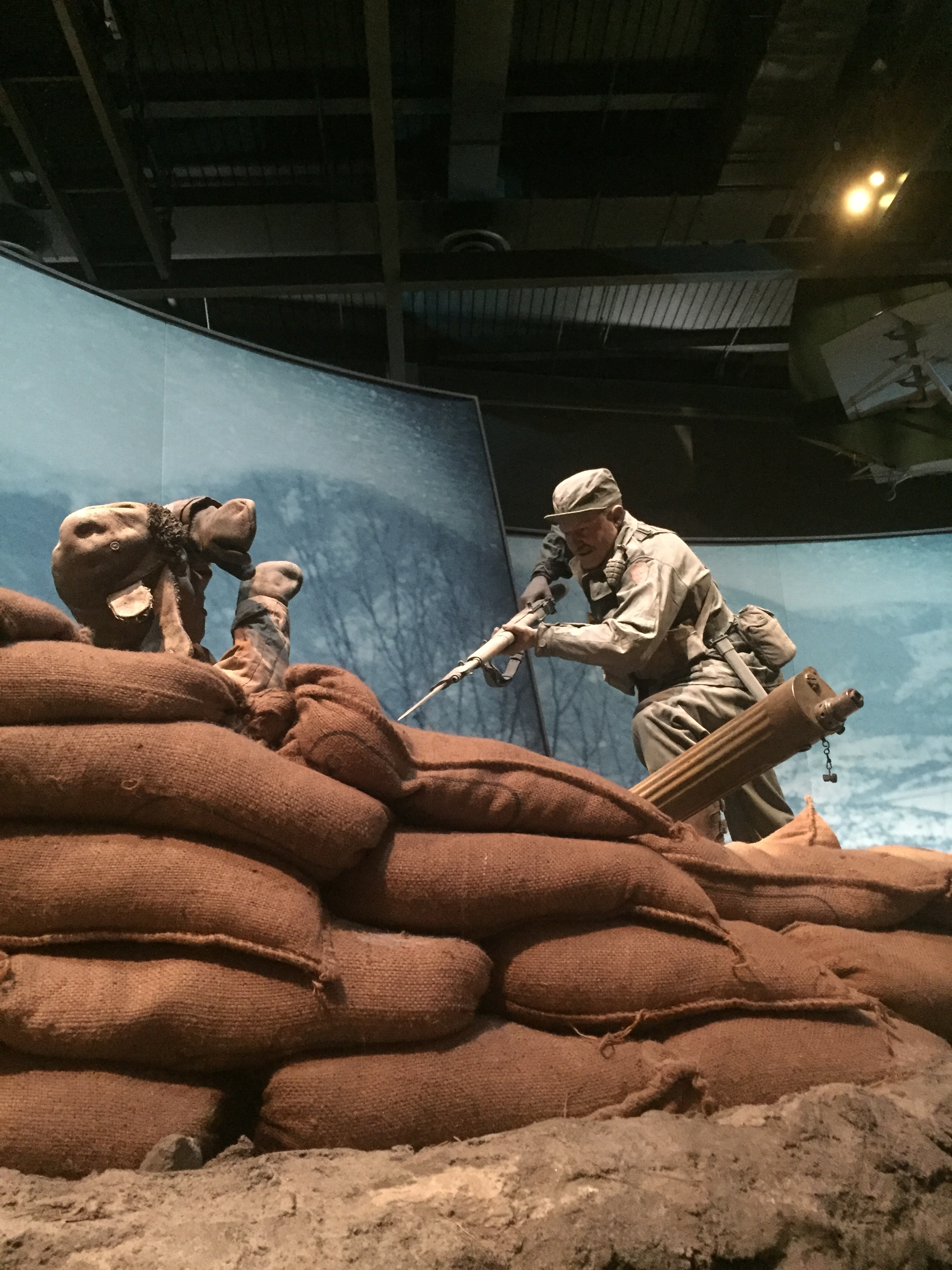
The life size diorama of Millett's charge up Hill 180 during the Korean War that resulted in his receipt of the Medal of Honor. The diorama is at the US Army Infantry Museum, Ft. Benning, GA.

== See also ==
- List of Korean War Medal of Honor recipients
- List of Bates College people
