= Orders, decorations, and medals of South Vietnam =

The system of Orders, decorations, and medals of South Vietnam came into being with the establishment of the National Order of Vietnam in 1950. Established by Bảo Đại, the head of state of the State of Vietnam, the order was the highest award of the state for both civilians and military personnel. This level of precedence continued under the government of South Vietnam. Lower ranking awards for both the military and civilians were subsequently established. The systems of civilian and military awards had their own order of precedence.

== National Order ==
- National Order of Vietnam

Grand Cross
Grand Officer
Commander
Officer
Knight

== Military awards and decorations ==
Military awards are worn in the following order:

- Military Merit Medal
- Distinguished Service Order

Army First Class
Army Second Class
Air Force First Class
Air Force Second Class
Navy First Class
Navy Second Class

- Meritorious Service Medal

Army Meritorious Service Medal
Air Force Meritorious Service Medal
Navy Meritorious Service Medal

- Special Service Medal
- Gallantry Cross

Gallantry Cross with Palm (cited at the Armed Forces level)
Gallantry Cross with Gold Star (cited at the Corps level)
Gallantry Cross with Silver Star (cited at the Division level)
Gallantry Cross with Bronze Star (cited at the Regiment or Brigade level)
Gallantry Cross Unit Award

- Air Gallantry Cross

Gold Wing Ribbon
Silver Wing Ribbon
Bronze Wing Ribbon

- Navy Gallantry Cross

Gold Anchor Ribbon
Silver Anchor Ribbon
Bronze Anchor Ribbon

- Hazardous Service Medal
- Life Saving Medal
- Loyalty Medal
- Wound Medal
- Armed Forces Honor Medal

First class
Second class

- Leadership Medal

Armed Forces level
Corps level
Division level
Brigade level
Regiment level
Battalion level
Company level

- Staff Service Medal

First class
Second class

- Technical Service Medal

First class
Second class

- Training Service Medal

First class
Second class

- Civil Actions Medal

First class
Second class
Unit Citation

- Good Conduct Medal

First class
Second class
Third class
Fourth class
Fifth class

- Vietnam Campaign Medal
- Military Service Medal

First class
Second class
Third class
Fourth class
Fifth class

- Air Service Medal

First class
Second class
Third class
Honor class

- Navy Service Medal

First class
Second class
Third class
Honor class

- Medal for Campaigns Outside the Frontier
- Air Force Northern Expeditionary Medal

== Civilian awards and decorations ==
Civilian awards are worn in the following order:

- Kim Khanh Decoration

Exceptional class
First class
Second class
Third class

- Chuong My Medal

First class
Second class

- Administrative Service Medal

First class
Second class

- Dedicated Service Medal

First class
Second class

- Justice Medal

First class
Second class

- Cultural and Educational Service Medal

First class
Second class

- Public Health Service Medal

First class
Second class

- Social Service Medal

First class
Second class

- Economic Service Medal

First class
Second class

- Finance Service Medal

First class
Second class

- Psychological Warfare Medal

First class
Second class

- Agricultural Service Medal

First class
Second class

- Public Works, Communication and Transportation Service Medal

First class
Second class

- Labor Medal

First class
Second class
Third class

- Rural Revolutionary Development Medal
- Ethnic Development Medal

First class
Second class

- Veterans Medal

First class
Second class

- Police Merit Medal

First class
Second class
Third class
Unit Citation

- Police Honor Medal

First class
Second class
Third class
Unit Citation

- People's Self-Defense Medal

First class
Second class

- Youth and Sports Service Medal

First class
Second class

- Hamlet Common Defense Medal

== Other awards ==
These awards are not listed in the order of precedence for military or civilian awards:

- Unity Medal
- Medal of Sacrifice
- Vietnam Presidential Unit Citation

== Foreign recipients ==
Many of the South Vietnamese military awards and decorations were awarded to members of foreign military forces fighting with and advising the South Vietnamese military. Some civilian awards were also presented, but their acceptance and wear was limited by the recipients' governments.
