= Trần Văn Minh =

Trần Văn Minh may refer to:

- Trần Văn Minh (diplomat) (1923–2009), Vietnamese diplomat and general of the Army of the Republic of Vietnam
- Trần Văn Minh (aviator) (1932–1997), general of the Republic of Vietnam Air Force
