= Air Service Medal =

Military decoration of South Vietnam

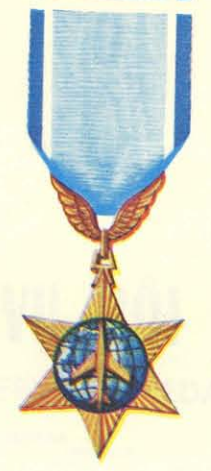
- Air Service Medal - Honour class
- Awarded for: Completed a prescribed number of flight hours on aircraft of the VNAF and allied air forces in Vietnam
- Presented by: South Vietnam
- Eligibility: Officers, NCOs, and airmen
- Status: No longer awarded
- Established: May 12, 1964
- First award: 1964
- Final award: 1974
- First class ribbon Second class ribbon Third class ribbon Honour class ribbon

Precedence
- Next (higher): Military Service Medal
- Next (lower): Navy Service Medal

The Air Service Medal was a decoration of the Republic of Vietnam. established by Decree No. 154 of 12 May 1964, it was intended to recognise members of the VNAF who completed a set number of flight hours.

== Classes ==
The medal was divided into four classes indicated by a device on the ribbon bar:

- First Class: this class recognised airmen who had accumulated more than 1,000 recorded flight hours. This class was indicated by a golden jet plane.
- Second Class: this class recognised airmen who had accumulated more than 600 recorded flight hours. This class was indicated by a silver jet plane.
- Third Class: this class recognised airmen who had accumulated more than 300 recorded flight hours. This class was indicated by a bronze jet plane.
- Honour Class: this class recognised members of other branches of the ARVN and foreign aviators who had conducted more than ten flights on VNAF or foreign planes in Vietnam.

== Description ==
The medal is a 38mm wide, six-pointed golden star with cut lines on the points. On the obverse, in the centre, is a light blue globe surmounted by a golden jet plane.

The reverse is plain, save for the words "VIỆT-NAM" and "KHÔNG-VỤ BỘI-TINH". The medal is suspended from a light blue ribbon with edge stripes of white and dark blue, attached to the medal by a suspender of golden wings.
