= Unity Medal =

Military decoration of South Vietnam

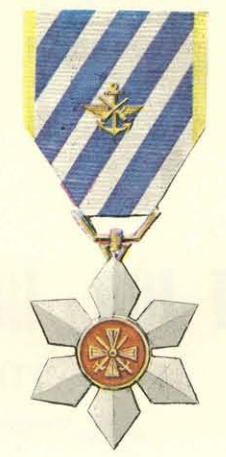
- Unity Medal
- Awarded for: Contributing to the development of the armed forces
- Presented by: South Vietnam
- Eligibility: Vietnamese and foreign civilians
- Status: No longer awarded
- Established: May 12, 1964
- First award: 1964
- Final award: 1974

The Unity Medal was a decoration of the Republic of Vietnam. established by Decree No. 146 of 12 May 1964, it was intended to recognise civilians, Vietnamese and foreign, who had contributed to the strengthening of the RVNMF with a particular focus on those who had improved the material or spiritual welfare of military personnel and their dependants.

== Description ==
The medal is a 34mm wide, six-pointed silver star. On the obverse, in the centre, is a red disc with a gold fillet upon which is a cross pattée with crossed swords that resembles the French Croix de Guerre (an award received by many Vietnamese soldiers and officers during the First Indochina War).

The reverse is plain, save for the words "VIỆT-NAM" and "NHẤT-TRÍ BỘI-TINH". The medal is suspended from a 38mm ribbon with two yellow 3.5mm edge stripes, the centre of the ribbon is diagonal, with 6mm blue stripes and 4mm white stripes, attached to the medal by a normal trapezoid suspender. On the drape is a clasp made of an anchor, crossed rifles, and wings, representing the three major services of the South Vietnamese armed forces
