= Military Merit Medal (Vietnam) =

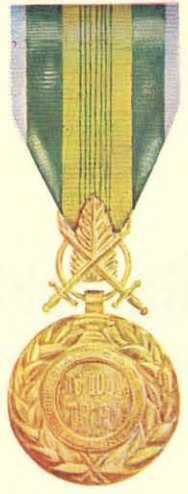
- Military Merit Medal (Second Republic)
- Type: Military Decoration
- Awarded for: valor or exceptionally distinguished service while fighting the enemy in the Republic of Vietnam
- Presented by: South Vietnam and State of Vietnam
- Eligibility: Non-commissioned officers, enlisted men, and generals
- Status: No longer awarded
- Established: August 15, 1950
- Final award: 1973
- Ribbon of the Military Merit Medal

Precedence
- Next (higher): National Order of Vietnam
- Next (lower): Distinguished Service Order
- Related: French Médaille Militaire

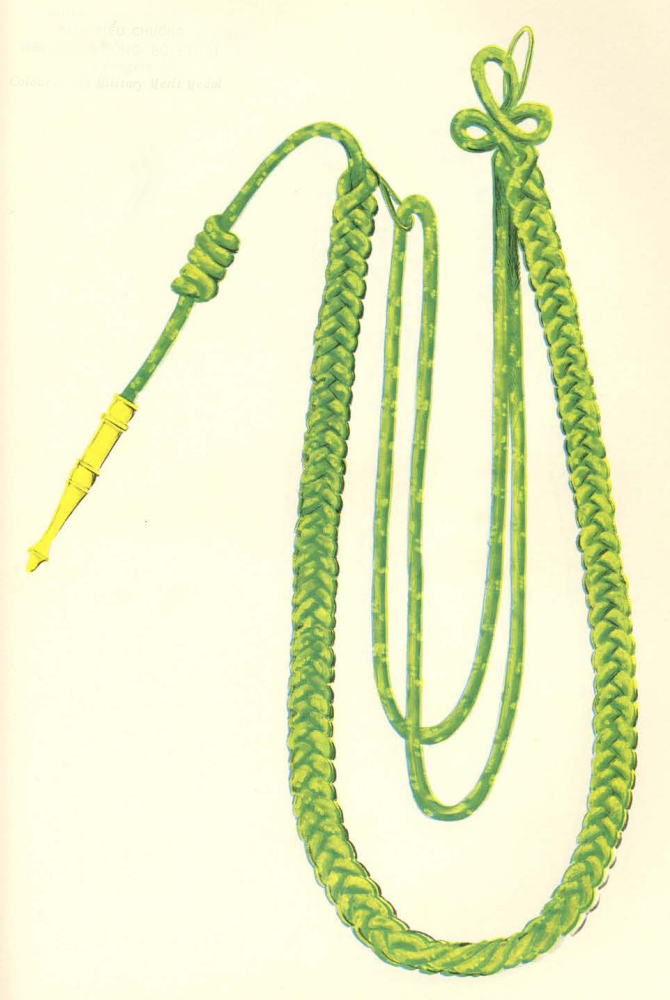
Fourragere Color of the Military Merit Medal

The Military Merit Medal (Vietnamese: Quân công Bội tinh) was the highest military decoration bestowed upon enlisted personnel by the Republic of Vietnam during the years of the Vietnam War. The medal was established on August 15, 1950. The Military Merit Medal was modeled after the French Médaille Militaire and was awarded mostly to enlisted men for valor in combat. The medal had three different versions, which coincided with the political changes in South Vietnam: the State of Vietnam, the First Republic, and the Second Republic versions. The Vietnamese National Order of Vietnam was considered the equivalent decoration for military officers.

== Award Criteria ==
"The Military Merit Medal is awarded or awarded posthumously to Non-Commissioned Officers (including Aspirants). Enlisted Men, and General Officers in the Armed Forces, who have:

- Previously received citations at the Armed Forces level.
- Been wounded once or many times in combat.
- Distinguished themselves by their heroic actions.
- Served in an honorable manner for at least 13 years.

"The Military Merit Medal may be awarded or posthumously awarded to Allied Non-Commissioned Officers and Enlisted Men for valor while fighting the enemy in the Republic of Vietnam."

== Acceptance and wear by allied forces ==
The United States military authorized the Military Merit Medal as a foreign decoration and permitted the medal to be worn on U.S. uniforms by enlisted personnel. A high number of Military Merit Medals were issued posthumously as the medal was most often awarded to United States servicemen who were killed in action. The Military Merit Medal was last issued to U.S. personnel in 1973 and was discontinued after the fall of South Vietnam in 1975. The decoration is now only available through private dealers in military insignia.

== Meritorious Citation ==
The Meritorious citation for the posthumous award of the Military Merit Medal:

"Servicemen of courage and rare self-sacrifice, they displayed at all times the most tactful cooperation while aiding the Armed Forces of the Republic of Vietnam to repel the Red wave undermining South Vietnam and Southeast Asia.

With a ready zeal and commendable responsibility, they fought on to the end in every mission and set a brilliant example for their fellow soldiers.

They died in the performance of duty. Behind them, they leave the abiding grief of their former comrades-in-arms, Vietnamese as well as American."

Many posthumous awards of the Military Merit Medal to American servicemen included the Vietnamese "Gallantry Cross with Palm".

== See also ==
- Orders, decorations, and medals of South Vietnam
