= Technical Service Medal =

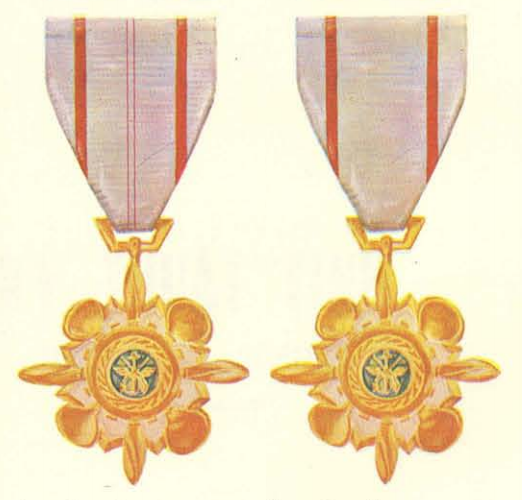
- Technical Service Medals (First class badge on the left & second class on the right)
- Type: Two-class award
- Awarded for: exemplary service while performing military duty on the staff of a major Vietnamese military command
- Presented by: South Vietnam
- Eligibility: Soldiers who have served at least six months on military staff
- Status: No longer awarded
- First award: 1964
- Final award: 1973
- First class ribbon Second class ribbon

Order of Wear
- Next (higher): Staff Service Medal
- Next (lower): Training Service Medal

The Technical Service Medal (Vietnamese: Kỹ-Thuật Bội-Tinh) was a military award of South Vietnam established in 1964. The medal was awarded in two classes and was awarded for outstanding initiative and devotion an individuals assigned staff duty.

Also known as the Republic of Vietnam Technical Service Honors Medal, the Technical Service Medal was bestowed in two classes, one for issuance to commissioned officers and the other class for warrant officers and enlisted personnel. The award appeared as a propellered disc suspended from a blue-grey ribbon. The second class version contained two vertical red lines while the first class medal displayed an additional set of thin red lines down the center of the award ribbon.

The award of the Technical Service Medal was open to both civilians and military personnel who had performed duties “as technicians or of a technical nature” and had demonstrated “outstanding professional capacity, initiative, and devotion to duty”. The decoration was therefore a “behind-the-lines” type of award, mainly awarded to those who were engaged in support and upkeep duties for units deployed to the front lines of the Vietnam War.

The two classes of the Vietnam Technical Service Medal were denoted by a slight variation in the award's ribbon bar, with the suspension medal for the decoration identical in both cases. The Vietnam Technical Service Medal was occasionally bestowed to foreigners, but not to the extent as other well known Vietnamese awards such as the Vietnam Gallantry Cross, Civil Actions Medal, and the Vietnam Campaign Medal.

The Vietnam Technical Service Medal became obsolete upon the fall of South Vietnam in 1975. The award is today only available from private dealers in military insignia.
