= Leadership Medal =

South Vietnamese military decoration

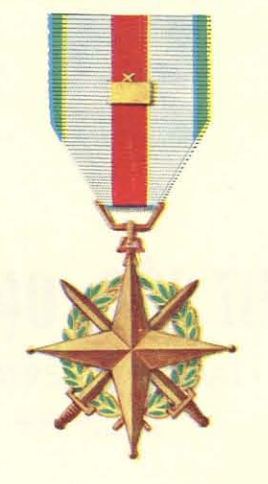
- Leadership Medal with Regiment level device
- Type: Five-grade decoration
- Awarded for: Excellent leadership in combat, operations, training, troop discipline and morale.
- Presented by: South Vietnam
- Eligibility: Vietnamese military officers
- Status: No longer awarded
- Established: June 5, 1964
- First award: 1964
- Final award: 1975

Highlights
- Total awarded posthumously: Yes
- Armed Forces level Corps level Division level Brigade level Regiment level Battalion level Company level

Precedence
- Next (higher): Armed Forces Honor Medal
- Next (lower): Staff Service Medal

The Republic of Vietnam Leadership Medal (Vietnamese: Chỉ-Đạo Bội-Tinh) was a five-grade decoration awarded by South Vietnam. Established in 1964, the medal was awarded to South Vietnamese military commanders by the Chief of the Joint General Staff, Republic of Vietnam Military Forces.

== Criteria ==
The Loyalty Medal was awarded to South Vietnamese military commanders who had shown excellent leadership in "combat, operations, training, troop discipline, and morale". The medal was awarded in five different classes depending on the level of command. It was awarded for commander at the Armed Forces, Corps, Division, Brigade, Regiment, Battalion, and Company levels.

== Appearance ==
The Leadership medal is a bronze colored medal. Its pendant depicts a four-pointed star. Between the arms of the star are two swords pointed up with a green laurel wreath behind the swords. The medal hangs from a white ribbon with green edges and a red center stripe. The class of award is shown by a ribbon attachment that is similar in appearance to the military map symbol of the unit level the recipient commanded.

== See also ==
- Orders, decorations, and medals of South Vietnam
