= Wound Medal (Vietnam) =

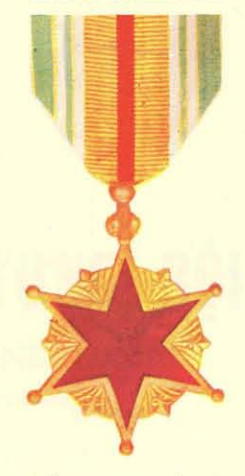
- Wound Medal
- Awarded for: Being wounded or killed in action
- Presented by: South Vietnam
- Eligibility: Military personnel who were engaged in armed combat with enemies of the Republic of Vietnam
- Status: No longer awarded
- Established: January 6, 1953
- Ribbon bar of the Wound Medal

Precedence
- Next (higher): Loyalty Medal
- Next (lower): Republic of Vietnam Armed Forces Honor Medal
- Related: United States Purple Heart; French Medal for the War Wounded

The Republic of Vietnam Wound Medal (Vietnamese: Chiến-Thương Bội-Tinh) was a military decoration of South Vietnam first created in 1953. The medal was the South Vietnamese equivalent of the United States military's Purple Heart, and was awarded to any personnel of the South Vietnamese military who, while engaged in armed combat with enemies of the Republic of Vietnam, were either wounded or killed in action.

During the Vietnam War, the Wound Medal was often issued to Army of the Republic of Vietnam (ARVN) personnel for combat wounds received fighting the forces of North Vietnam or the Vietcong. The medal was rarely bestowed upon members of allied militaries such as the United States military and then only if the allied soldier in question was attacked and under the direct command of a South Vietnamese unit. For service members of the United States military, the Wound Medal is not authorized for wear on a military uniform.

With the fall of South Vietnam in 1975, the Wound Medal became obsolete.

== See also ==
- Military awards and decorations of South Vietnam
