= Hazardous Service Medal =

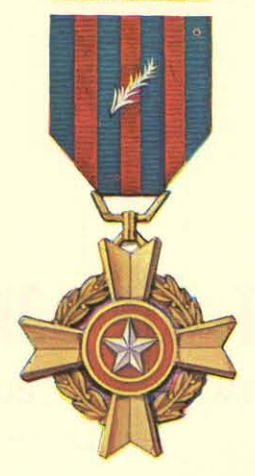
- Hazardous Service Medal
- Type: Single-grade decoration
- Presented by: South Vietnam
- Eligibility: Military personnel of South Vietnam and allied foreign countries
- Status: No longer awarded

Highlights
- Total awarded posthumously: Yes
- Ribbon bar of the Hazardous Service Medal

Precedence
- Next (higher): Navy Gallantry Cross
- Next (lower): Life Saving Medal (Vietnam)

The Hazardous Service Medal (Vietnamese: Ưu-Dũng Bội-Tinh) was a single-grade decoration awarded by South Vietnam. Established in 1964, the medal was awarded to military personnel by the Chief of the Joint General Staff, Republic of Vietnam Armed Forces. The medal could be awarded posthumously and also to members of allied military forces.

== Criteria ==
The Hazardous Service Medal was awarded to military personnel who met one of the following requirements:

- Displayed heroism in the protection of government properties or the life of government officials.
- Endured a long period of danger to accomplish a strategic mission in a remote area under constant enemy threat.
- Proven enthusiasm and determination in the accomplishment of a relatively dangerous mission not involving direct combat participation.

== See also ==
- Orders, decorations, and medals of South Vietnam
