= Civil Actions Medal =

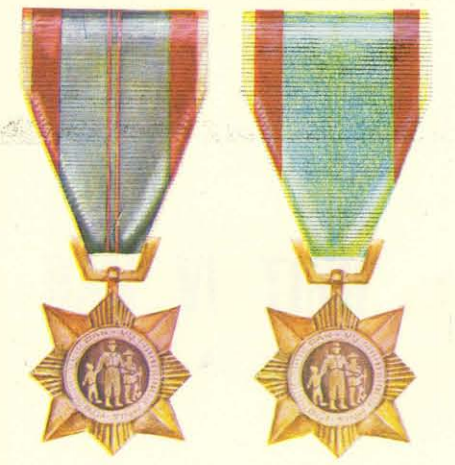
- Republic of Vietnam Civil Actions Medal (First class badge on the left & second class on the right)
- Type: Military medal (Two class decoration): First Class - Officers; Second Class - Enlisted personnel
- Awarded for: Performing outstanding achievements (meritorious achievements) in the field of civil affairs.
- Presented by: South Vietnam
- Eligibility: South Vietnamese military and allied nations' militaries.
- Established: May 12, 1964
- First award: 1964
- Final award: 1975
- First class ribbon Second class ribbon Civil Actions Medal Unit Citation Emblem (U.S. Army) Civil Actions Medal Unit Citation Ribbon (in the color of the Civil Actions Medal, First Class) Civil Actions Medal Unit Citation Streamer (with Palm) (in the color of the Civil Actions Medal)

Precedence
- Next (higher): Training Service Medal
- Next (lower): Good Conduct Medal

The Republic of Vietnam Civil Actions Medal (Vietnamese: Dân-Vụ Bội-Tinh) also known as the Vietnam Civil Actions Medal or Civil Actions Medal, is a military decoration of the former South Vietnamese government (1955–1975). The medal was created on May 12, 1964 during the Vietnam War. The Civil Actions Medal was awarded to the South Vietnamese military and its allies' military personnel or units that performed outstanding achievements in the field of civil affairs. The medal was awarded in two classes, with the first-class intended for commissioned officers and the second class for enlisted personnel. Individuals who were cited received the medal, ribbon, and a citation.

The South Vietnamese government authorized members of a unit awarded the Civil Actions Medal to wear the Civil Actions Unit Citation Emblem with Palm and Frame (Civil Actions Medal, First Class color). Only one unit citation emblem with palm and frame could be worn on the service uniform. The ribbon with palm and frame (no medal or citation) is authorized for the unit award of the medal.

== Medal ==
=== Description ===
The Civil Actions Medal, occasionally referred to as the Civic Actions Medal, is a bronze eight-pointed star with alternating points of the star lined, superimposed by a disk with a figure of a soldier, a child, and a farmer with a shovel, all enclosed by a white enamel designation band inscribed Dân Vụ (Civil Action) at the top and Bội Tinh (Medal) at the bottom. The Republic of Vietnam made some revisions pertaining to the Civil Actions Medal in 1965 and 1967.

=== Ribbons ===
The Civil Action Medal, First and Second Class, has a suspension ribbon and service ribbon that is Bottle Green and Scarlet. The first-class color is distinguished from the second class color by the first-class medal having two narrow red stripes in the center of the medal's ribbon. The Civil Actions Unit Citation Emblem is in the first-class color only.

=== Ribbon devices ===
The first Civil Action Medal was awarded without a ribbon device. Each additional award of the medal had one of four devices representing four levels an individual was cited from; a large palm indicated a citation from the Armed Forces level. Subsequent award devices were attached on service and suspension ribbons of the medal. The unit citation emblem has a small palm and thin gold frame for the U.S. Navy, Marine Corps and Air Force, and thick gold frame for the U.S. Army:

- Palm - Armed Forces level
- Gold Star - Corps level
- Silver Star - Division level
- Bronze Star - Brigade or Regiment level

== Unit Award ==
The unit citation was referred to as the Vietnam Civil Actions Unit Citation with Palm or as the Vietnam Meritorious Unit Citation with Civil Actions Colors by the U.S. Navy, U.S. Marine Corps, and U.S. Coast Guard. The unit citation was awarded to US Army units during the Vietnam War as the Civil Actions Honor Medal, FC. The award does not have a medal, it is a ribbon award.

The Civil Actions Unit Citation Emblem was awarded to all members of military command or unit who had participated in civic actions to such a degree as would warrant an individual Vietnam Civil Actions Medal. The unit citation ribbon uses the Vietnam Civil Actions Medal design (First Class with two thin red stripes in center) service ribbon with a bronze palm enclosed in a thin gold frame for the U.S. Navy, Marine Corps, Coast Guard, and Air Force, and a thick gold frame for U.S. Army personnel.

== Separate awards ==
Regulations of the U.S. various military branches pertaining to the wearing of medals, awards, and decorations permits the display of both the Civil Actions Medal and service ribbon signifying an individual award of the medal (if authorized) and/or the gold-framed ribbon signifying a member's unit award of the medal as the Civil Actions Medal Unit Citation (if authorized).

The Civil Actions Medal and the Civil Actions Unit Citation with Palm and Frame ribbon were awards bestowed by the Republic of Vietnam to foreign military personnel. The Civil Actions Unit Citation was awarded to members of cited units of the United States Army and United States Marine Corps which had participated in local police actions to suppress civil unrest in certain areas of South Vietnam, and all United States Coast Guard members for providing medical care to the South Vietnamese population (Medical Civic Action Program Medical or "MEDCAPS").

=== Other awards ===
Other Republic of Vietnam awards includes the Republic of Vietnam Gallantry Cross, Republic of Vietnam Gallantry Cross Unit Citation, and the Republic of Vietnam Campaign Medal. The Vietnam Civil Actions Medal and the Vietnam Civil Actions Medal Unit Citation Emblem are available only through private dealers of military insignia.

== U.S. award manuals ==
Department of Defense Manual (1348.33 Vol. 3)

- Enclosure 3
- 11. Foreign Decorations and Service Awards
- (8) The following non-U.S. ribbons have been authorized for wear
- b. The Republic of Vietnam Gallantry Cross With Palm and Frame Unit Citation. Awarded by the Republic of Vietnam to units for valorous combat achievements.
- c. The Republic of Vietnam Civil Actions With Palm and Frame Unit Citation. Awarded by the Republic of Vietnam in recognition of meritorious civil action service.

U.S. Army Awards Manual (AR 600-8-22)

- Republic of Vietnam Civil Actions Unit Citation:
- The unit citation of the Civil Actions Unit Citation is awarded by the Vietnamese government for meritorious service. The award of the Civil Actions Unit Citation, First Class, is accompanied with Oak Leaf Clusters. The Palm used in the Gallantry Cross with Palm Unit Citation is the Oak Leaf device and is worn with the stem to the wearer's right.
- The unit citation was awarded to certain units during the period 1 March 1961 to 28 March 1974.

Former US Army personnel who served in the Vietnam War can still apply for the Republic of Vietnam Civil Actions Unit Citation with Palm and Frame (and Republic of Vietnam Gallantry Cross Unit Citation with Palm and Frame) if they have not received the award.

U.S. Air Force Awards and Decorations Manual (Air Force Instruction 36-2803, 2001)

- Chapter 7
- Foreign Awards and Decorations
- 7.1 Foreign Unit Awards
- 7.1.3 Republic of Vietnam Gallantry Cross Unit Citation
- 7.1.4 Republic of Vietnam Civil Action Unit Citation

Former US Air Force personnel who served in the Vietnam War can apply for the unit award.

U.S. Navy and Marine Corps Awards Manual (SecNavInst 1650.1H)

- Republic of Vietnam Meritorious Unit Citation:
- Awarded by the Chief of the Joint General Staff, Republic of Vietnam Armed Forces in two colors:
- Gallantry Cross Medal Color with Palm and Frame (8 Feb 1962 to 28 Mar 1973)
- Civil Actions Medal, First Class Color with Palm and Frame (1 Jan 1965 to 28 Mar 1973)
- The ribbon bar with palm and frame are authorized for wear. In addition to specific ships/units cited (in Southeast Asia) and authorized by the Secretary of the Navy, all Navy and Marine Corps personnel who served "in country" Vietnam during eligibility periods are eligible for both awards.

Former Navy and Marine Corps personnel who served in the Vietnam War can apply for the two Republic of Vietnam unit awards. A written request can be submitted for the awards as The Republic of Vietnam Meritorious Unit Citation (Gallantry Cross) and the Republic of Vietnam Meritorious Unit Citation (Civil Actions Medal).

U.S. Coast Guard Medals and Awards Manual (COMDTINST M1650.25D)

- Award Precedence
- 5. Foreign Personal Decorations and Unit Awards (no medals authorized)
- Republic of Vietnam Meritorious Unit Citation Gallantry Cross Medal Color
- Republic of Vietnam Meritorious Unit Citation Civil Actions Medal First Class Color

Former Coast Guard personnel who served in the Vietnam War can apply for the unit award.

== Notable recipients ==
- General William C. Westmoreland, US Army, Retired
