= Distinguished Service Order (Vietnam) =

Military award of South Vietnam

Vietnam Distinguished Service Order
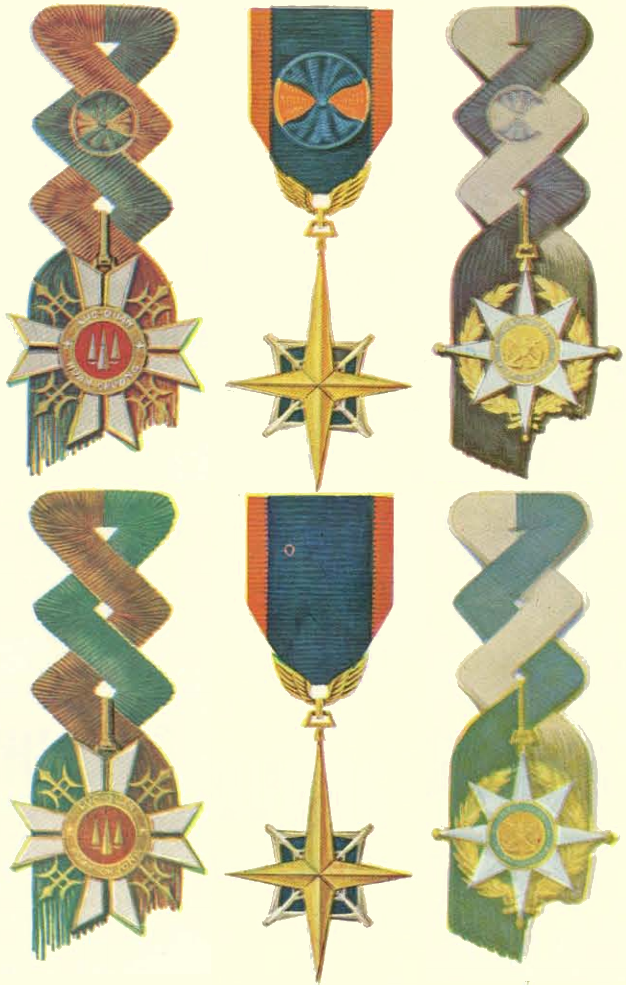
- Badge of the Vietnam Distinguished Service Orders (First class ribbons on top row & second class on bottom row)
- Type: Two-grade award. The two classes were: Officers; Enlisted
- Awarded for: "meritorious or heroic deeds related to war time operations"
- Presented by: South Vietnam
- Eligibility: Military personnel of South Vietnam and foreign countries
- Campaign: Vietnam War
- Status: No longer awarded
- Final award: 1974
- Army, Air Force & Navy Ribbon bars of each respective Vietnam Distinguished Service Order (First class ribbons on top row & second class on bottom row)

Precedence
- Next (higher): Military Merit Medal
- Next (lower): Meritorious Service Medal

The Army Distinguished Service Order (Vietnamese: Lục-Quân Huân-Chương), Air Force Distinguished Service Order (Vietnamese: Không-Lực Huân-Chương), and Navy Distinguished Service Order (Vietnamese: Hải-Quân Huân-Chương) was a military decoration of South Vietnam which was awarded throughout the years of the Vietnam War. The decoration was bestowed for meritorious or heroic deeds related to wartime operations and was awarded for both combat and non-combat service.

There were two classes of the Army/Air Force/Navy Distinguished Service Order, the first class being for officers and the second class for enlisted personnel. The first class of the order was differentiated by a blossom device centered on the medal and ribbon.

The Army/Air Force/Navy Distinguished Service Order was also provided to foreign militaries, and in the United States military the decoration was considered the equivalent of the Legion of Merit. For foreign officers, the 2nd class of the order was also provided to officers.

The decoration ranked immediately below the National Order of the Republic of Vietnam and the Republic of Vietnam Military Merit Medal. It was among the less commonly bestowed medals, in contrast to such decorations as the Republic of Vietnam Gallantry Cross and Republic of Vietnam Campaign Medal.

The last issuance of the Vietnam Distinguished Service Order was in 1974, before the Fall of Saigon.

== Criteria ==
The Army/Air Force/Navy Distinguished Service Order is awarded or posthumously awarded to RVN Army/Air Force/Navy Officers who meet one of the following requirements:

- Have been cited or wounded many times in combat or in line of duty.
- Have accomplished exceptionally important achievements that reflect great credit on, or is beneficial to the RVN Army/Air Force/Navy in any field.

The Army/Air Force/Navy Distinguished Service Order is also intended for Army/Air Force/Navy units and General Officers in other armed services, who have accomplished an achievement that is exceptionally important and beneficial to the Republic of Vietnam Army/Air Force/Navy.

== See also ==
- Orders, decorations, and medals of South Vietnam
