= Military Service Medal (South Vietnam) =

Military decoration of South Vietnam

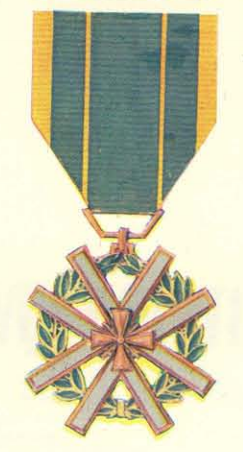
- Military Service Medal - Fifth class
- Awarded for: Completed a prescribed service time and displayed good conduct and high working spirit
- Presented by: South Vietnam
- Eligibility: Officers, NCOs, and soldiers
- Status: No longer awarded
- Established: May 12, 1964
- First award: 1964
- Final award: 1974
- First class ribbon Second class ribbon Third class ribbon Fourth class ribbon Fifth class ribbon

Precedence
- Next (higher): Vietnam Campaign Medal
- Next (lower): Air Service Medal

The Military Service Medal (Vietnamese: Quân-Vụ Bội-Tinh) was a military decoration of South Vietnam. Established in 1964, the medal recognised the completion of a prescribed service time, the displayment of good conduct, and the high working spirit in service.

== Classes ==
The medal was divided into four classes indicated by a device on the ribbon bar:

- First Class: This class recognised soldiers who had served more than twenty-three years in the military. This class was indicated by five palm leaves.
- Second Class: This class recognised soldiers who had served more than eighteen years in the military. This class was indicated by four palm leaves.
- Third Class: This class recognised soldiers who had served more than thirteen years in the military. This class was indicated by three palm leaves.
- Fourth Class: This class recognised soldiers who had served more than eight years in the military. This class was indicated by two palm leaves.
- Fifth Class: This class recognised soldiers who had served more than three years in the military. This class was indicated by one palm leaf.

== Description ==
The Medal is 37mm wide and is formed of four white Vs in the shape of a cross pattée surrounded by a green wreath. In the centre is a cross pattée with crossed swords between the arms.

The reverse has the words "VIỆT-NAM" along with the words "QUÂN-VỤ BỘI-TINH" in a diamond-shaped section. The ribbon is green with four yellow stripes; the two closer to the centre are 1mm, and the two edge stripes are 3.5mm. The suspension device was a standard trapezoid device.

== See also ==
- Military awards and decorations of South Vietnam
