= Good Conduct Medal (Vietnam) =

Military decoration of South Vietnam

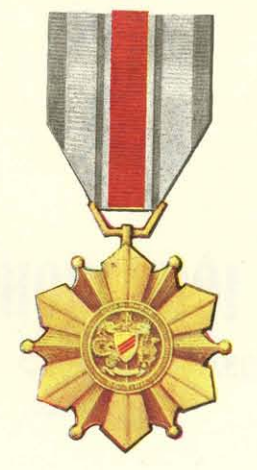
- Good Conduct Medal - Fifth class
- Awarded for: Displayed exemplary conduct and discipline with 3 years of service
- Presented by: South Vietnam
- Eligibility: Officers, NCOs, and soldiers
- Status: No longer awarded
- Established: June 5, 1964
- First award: 1964
- Final award: 1974
- First class ribbon Second class ribbon Third class ribbon Fourth class ribbon Fifth class ribbon

Precedence
- Next (higher): Civil Actions Medal
- Next (lower): Vietnam Campaign Medal

The Good Conduct Medal (Vietnamese: Quân-Phong Bội-Tinh) was a military decoration of South Vietnam. Established in 1964, the medal recognized the display of exemplary conduct and discipline. It also required three years of service in the Republic of Vietnam Armed Forces.

The Good Conduct Medal has five different grades and some of them contains the fleur-de-lis device, starting from the fourth ranks and up.

== See also ==
- Military awards and decorations of South Vietnam
