= Training Service Medal =

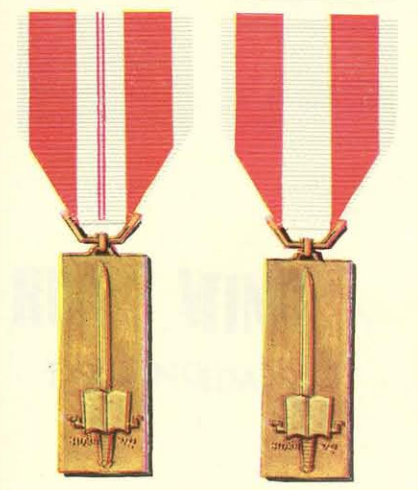
- Training Service Medal (First class badge on the left & second class on the right)
- Type: Two-class award
- Awarded for: Outstanding service while performing in a training assignment
- Presented by: South Vietnam
- Eligibility: Officers, NCOs, and soldiers
- Status: No longer awarded
- First award: 1964
- Final award: 1974
- First class ribbon Second class ribbon

Precedence
- Next (higher): Technical Service Medal
- Next (lower): Civil Actions Medal

The Training Service Medal (Vietnamese: Huấn-Vụ Bội-Tinh) was a military decoration of South Vietnam. Established in 1964, the medal recognized outstanding service in an assignment at a military school or training center. It could also be awarded for overall significant contributions to the training of the Republic of Vietnam Armed Forces.

== Criteria ==
The Training Service Medal is awarded to instructors and cadres assigned to military training centers and schools. Recipients must have shown outstanding professional ability, devotion to duty, and made significant contributions to the training of the South Vietnamese military. Individuals who served as instructors, but were not assigned to training centers or schools could also be awarded the medal. They must have completed a certain number of training hours as set by the training schools and centers. They were also required to display outstanding professional ability and devotion to duty. The medal could be awarded to organizations, government officials, civilians, as well as foreigners who, through direct or indirect effort, contributed to the training of South Vietnamese military personnel.
