= National Order of Vietnam =

South Vietnamese national award

National Order of Vietnam Bảo Quốc Huân Chương
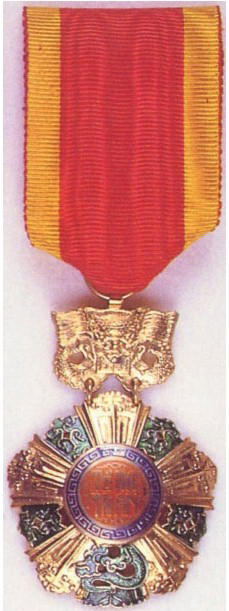
- Knight's badge of the National Order of Vietnam

Awarded by South Vietnam and State of Vietnam
- Type: State order of chivalry
- Established: 15 August 1950
- Ribbon: Yellow and Red
- Motto: Tổ-Quốc Tri-Ân ("The Gratitude of the Fatherland")
- Eligibility: Military, civilian
- Status: No longer awarded
- Founder: Emperor Bảo Đại
- Grades: Grand Cross; Grand Officer; Commander; Officer; Knight/Dame

Precedence
- Next (higher): None (Highest)
- Next (lower): Military Merit Medal
- Related: French National Order of the Legion of Honour; French Colonial Imperial Order of the Dragon of Annam
- Ribbon bar of the order

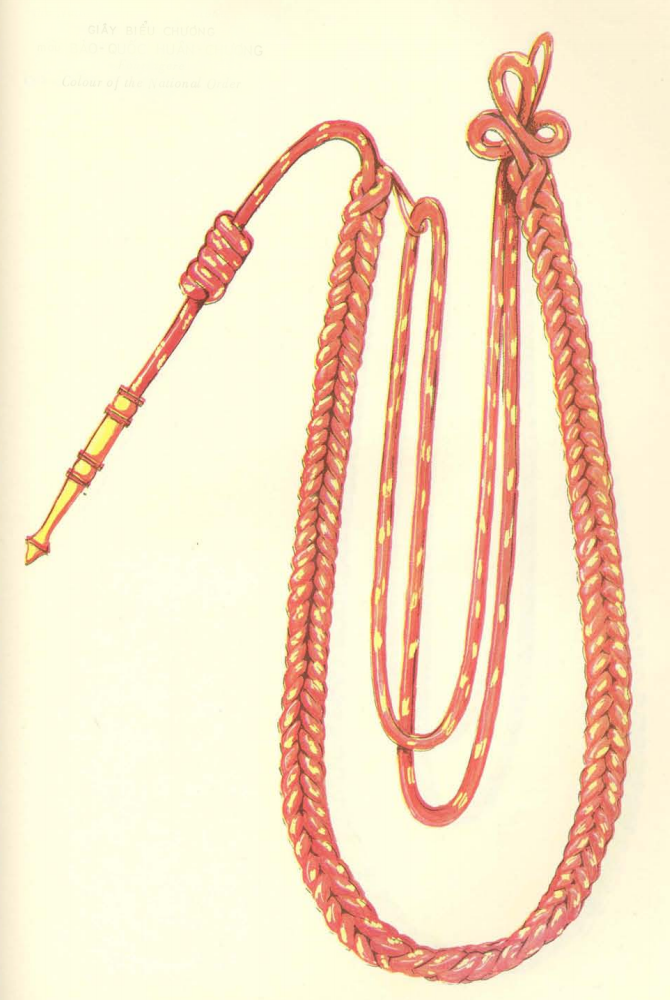
Fourragere Color of the National Order

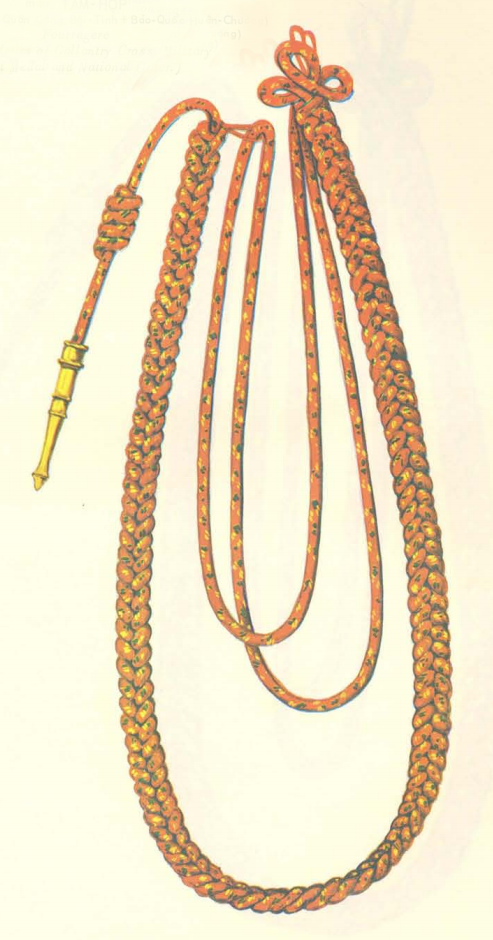
Fourragere (Mixed colors of Gallantry Cross, Military Merit Medal, and National Order)

The National Order of Vietnam (Vietnamese: Bảo Quốc Huân Chương) was a combined military-civilian decoration of the State of Vietnam and its successor, the Republic of Vietnam. It was considered the highest honor that could be bestowed upon an individual by the Republic of Vietnam government.

The decoration was created in 1950 and was awarded to any person who performed "grandiose works, remarkable deeds, exhibited bravery, or for those who have honored and served the country by lofty virtues and outstanding knowledge."

The National Order was modeled after the French National Order of the Legion of Honour, and as such it was issued in five degrees:

- Grand Cross – wore the badge of the Order on a sash on the right shoulder, plus the star of the Order on the right stomach or just the star of the Order on the left stomach
- Grand Officer – wore the star of the Order on the right stomach
- Commander – wore the badge on a necklet
- Officer – wore the badge on a ribbon with rosette on the left chest
- Knight – wore the badge on a ribbon on the left chest

Both the badge and the star had the same design, as shown in the top right of this page. The ribbon was red with yellow borders. It was, in fact, the ribbon of the former Order of the Dragon of Annam when awarded by the Emperor of Annam himself (when awarded by the French Government the ribbon was green with orange borders).

During the Vietnam War, the National Order of Vietnam was bestowed on several members of the United States military, most of whom were senior military and political advisors to the South Vietnamese government. The decoration could also be awarded posthumously.

Since the National Order of Vietnam was both a civil and a military decoration, it was displayed above all other awards when worn on a military uniform. A purely military equivalent of the decoration was the Vietnam Military Merit Medal, awarded only to members of the military.

The five classes wearing their respective insignia: 1: Đệ Ngũ Đẳng; 2: Đệ Tứ Đẳng; 3: Đệ Tam Đẳng; 4: Đệ Nhì Đẳng; 5: Đệ Nhất Đẳng.

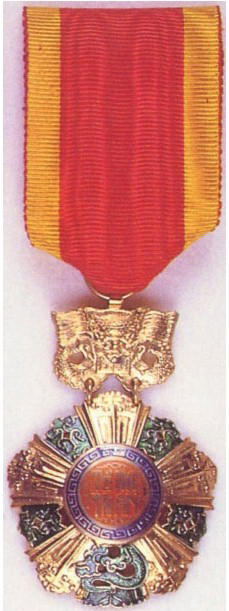
Knight (Badge with ribbon)

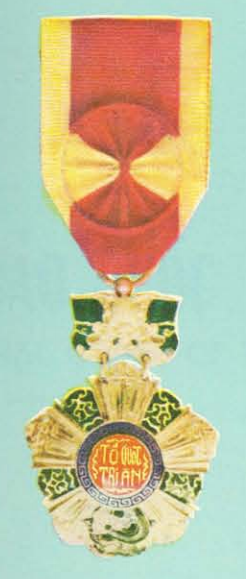
Officer (Badge with ribbon and rosette)

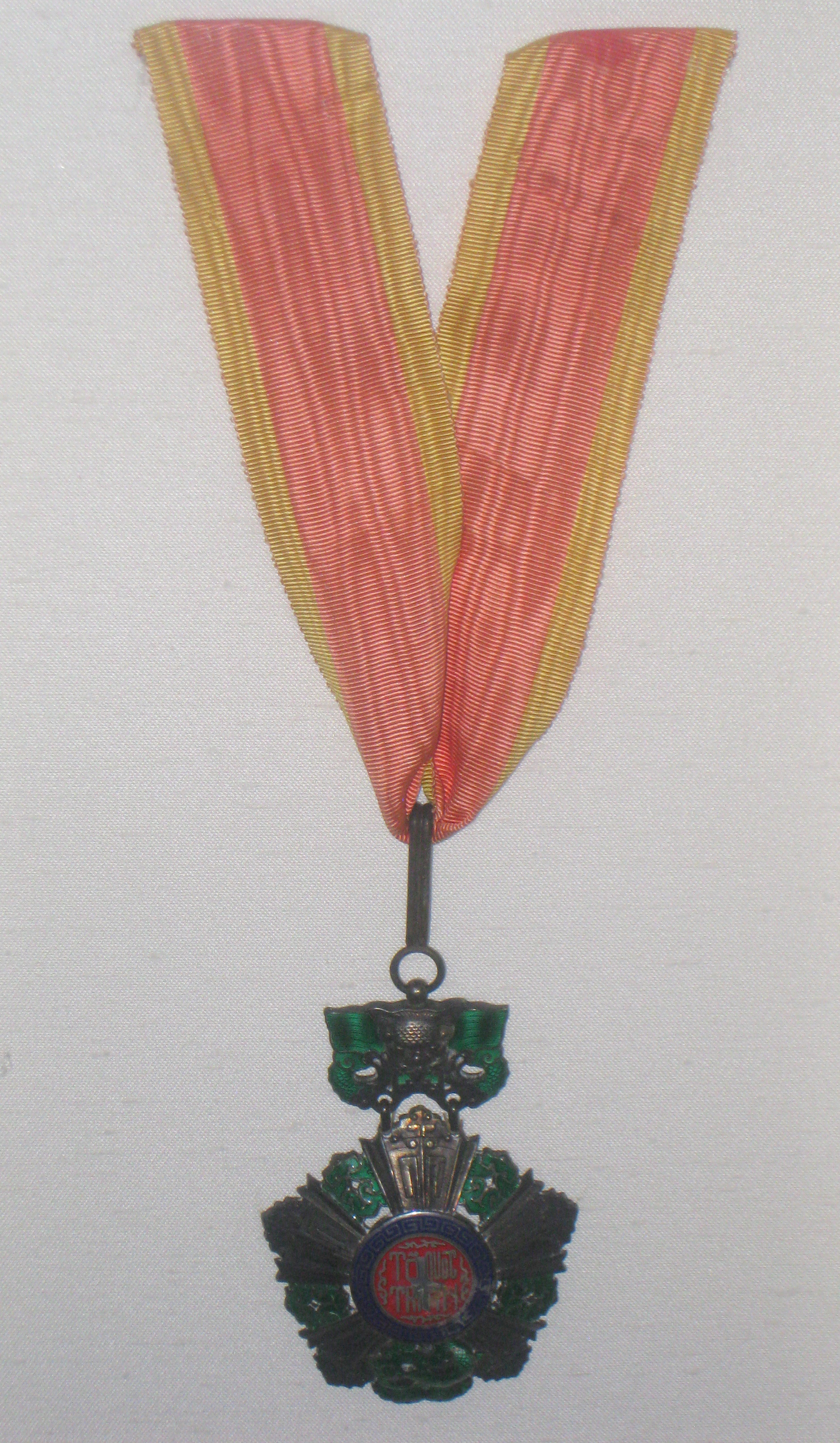
Commander (Badge with necklet)

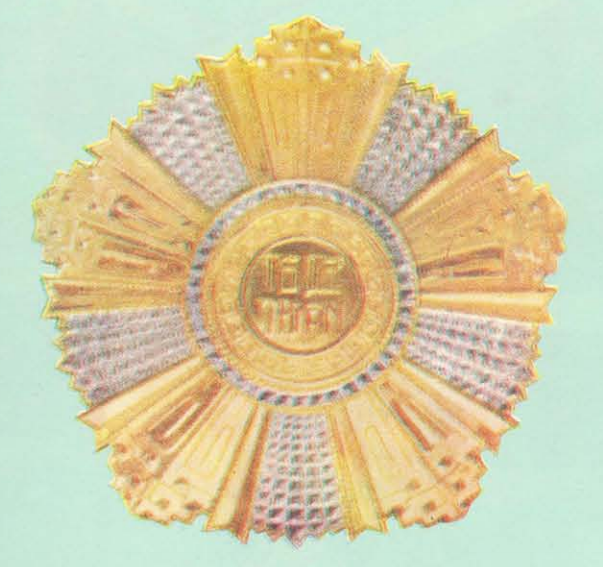
Grand Officer (Star)

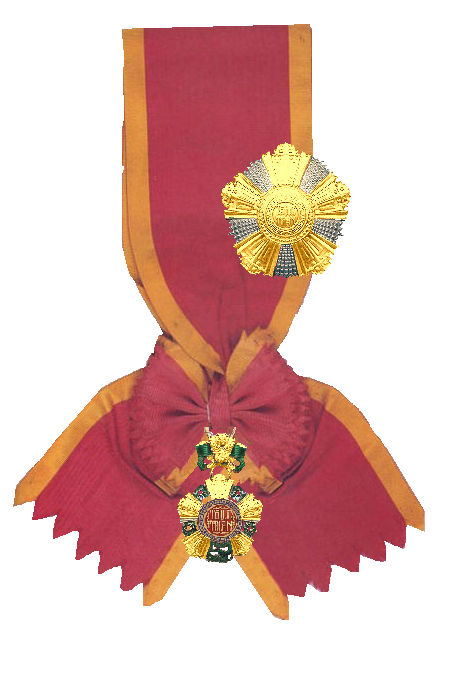
Grand Cross (Badge with sash and star)

Ribbon Bar

== Notable recipients ==
- Alfredo M. Santos, Chief of Staff of the Armed Forces of the Philippines
- Haile Selassie I, Emperor of Ethiopia
- Henry Cabot Lodge, Jr. (1902–1985)
- Cao Văn Viên (1921–2008), Army of the Republic of Vietnam General, Commander of III Corps
- Alexander Haig (1924–2010), United States Secretary of State
- Hồ Văn Nhựt (1905–1986), Founder of the Southern Red Cross of Vietnam
- Thanom Kittikachorn, Prime Minister of Thailand
- Đỗ Cao Trí, ARVN General, Commander of I, II and III Corps
- Sharon Ann Lane (1943–1969), U.S. Army nurse
- Rembrandt C. Robinson (1924–1972), Commander Cruiser/Destroyer Group, U.S. Seventh Fleet
- Ted Serong (1915–2002), Australian Army counter-insurgency expert, served in Vietnam 1962–1975
- Nguyễn Khánh, South Vietnamese politician and ARVN general

== See also ==
- Orders, decorations, and medals of South Vietnam
- Legion of Honour
