= Armed Forces Honor Medal =

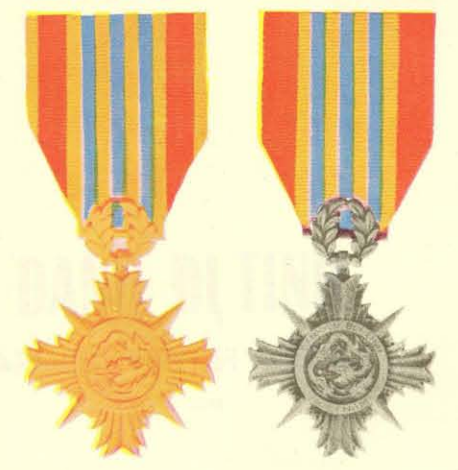
- Armed Forces Honor Medals (First class badge on the left & second class on the right)
- Type: Medal (two-class decoration)
- Presented by: South Vietnam
- Eligibility: Military personnel of South Vietnam and foreign entities
- Campaigns: Actively contributing to the formation and organization of the Vietnamese military and actively participated in cadre training of Vietnamese units
- Status: No longer awarded
- Established: January 7, 1953
- First class ribbon Second class ribbon

Order of Wear
- Next (higher): Republic of Vietnam Wound Medal
- Next (lower): Leadership Medal

The Republic of Vietnam Armed Forces Honor Medal (Vietnamese: Danh-Dự Bội-Tinh) was a military decoration awarded by South Vietnam, first established on January 7, 1953. It was awarded in two classes and was most commonly bestowed during the Vietnam War. The medal was frequently presented to members of foreign militaries, including military advisors from the United States Armed Forces.

The Armed Forces Honor Medal was granted to military personnel who made significant contributions to the formation and organization of the Vietnamese military in South Vietnam, as well as to those involved in the training of Vietnamese military units. It was intended to recognize non-combat achievements.

The first-class medal was awarded to commissioned officers, while the second-class medal was given to warrant officers and enlisted personnel. The first-class medallion was gold, and the second-class medallion was silver. The suspension and service ribbons for the two classes were distinguished by a gold and red pattern for the first class, and by two red patterns on either side for the second class. Both ribbons featured three central vertical stripes of light blue.

Today, the medal is no longer awarded and can only be obtained through private dealers specializing in military insignia.

== Notable recipients ==
- Charles Alvin Beckwith
- Basil L. Plumley
- William C. Westmoreland
- J. Paul Reason
- George W. Casey, Sr.
- Barry McCaffrey
- John Shalikashvili
- H. Norman Schwarzkopf, Jr.
- Creighton Abrams
- William J. Crowe
- Jay L. Johnson
- Frederick C. Blesse
- William Francis Buckley
- Jon R. Cavaiani
- Joseph W. Dailey
- Paris Davis
- Wesley L. Fox
- George Patton IV
- Wilbur F. Simlik
- Ormond R. Simpson
- Bernard E. Trainor
- Frederick C. Weyand
- Herbert L. Wilkerson
- Wallace P. Franz
