= Vietnam Staff Service Medal =

Republic of Vietnam Staff Service Medal
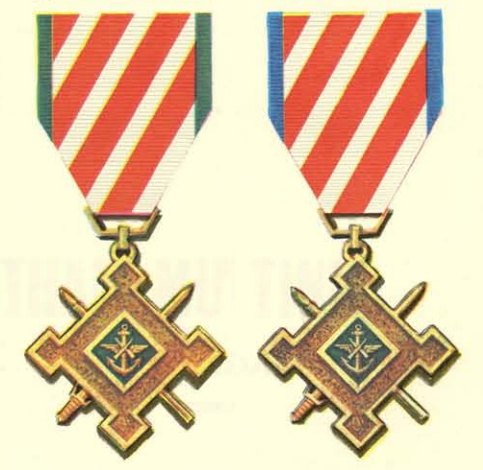
- Staff Service Medals (First class badge on the left & second class on the right)
- Type: Two-class award
- Awarded for: exemplary service while performing military duty on the staff of a major Vietnamese military command
- Presented by: South Vietnam
- Eligibility: Soldiers who have served at least six months on military staff
- Status: No longer awarded
- First award: 1964
- Final award: 1973
- First class ribbon Second class ribbon

Order of Wear
- Next (higher): Leadership Medal
- Next (lower): Technical Service Medal

The Republic of Vietnam Staff Service Medal (Vietnamese: Tham-Mưu Bội-Tinh) was a military award of South Vietnam established in 1964. The medal was awarded in two classes and was awarded for outstanding initiative and devotion an individuals assigned staff duty.

== Criteria ==
To be awarded the Staff Service Medal, a service member must have performed military duty, while serving on a military staff, of the Republic of Vietnam. Recipients must have shown, "...outstanding initiative and devotion to their assigned staff duty". The Staff Service Medal was presented in two classes for such service with the first class for officers and the second class for non-commissioned officers and enlisted personnel. The two different grades were annotated by border coloring on the medal’s ribbon, the first class being green and the second class blue.
