= Vietnam Campaign Medal =

Republic of Vietnam Campaign Medal
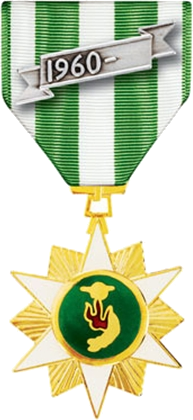
- Republic of Vietnam Campaign Medal with 1960– Device
- Type: Campaign medal
- Awarded for: Wartime service and support of military operations in Vietnam by the South Vietnamese military.
- Presented by: South Vietnam
- Eligibility: Members of the South Vietnamese military and members of allied countries' armed forces.
- Campaigns: First Indochina War; Second Indochina War (Vietnam War)
- Clasps: 1949–54: medal ribbon 49–54: service ribbon 49–54: miniature medal ribbon 1960– : medal ribbon 60– : service ribbon 60– : miniature medal ribbon
- Status: No longer awarded
- Established: 1949; 24 March 1966
- First award: RVN: 8 March 1949 – 20 July 1954; France: 8 March 1949 – 20 July 1954; RVN: 1 January 1960 – 30 April 1975; U.S.: 1 March 1961 – 28 March 1973; Australia: 31 July 1962 – 28 March 1973; New Zealand: 1964 to 1973; South Korea: Unknown; Other: Unknown
- Final award: RVN: 20 July 1954; France: 20 July 1954; RVN: 30 April 1975; U.S.: 28 March 1973; Australia: 28 March 1973; New Zealand: 1973; South Korea: Unknown; Other: Unknown
- Service ribbon with 60– Device (Note: The 1960– Device is used for the medal.)

Precedence
- Next (higher): Good Conduct Medal (Foreign military awards precedence vary)
- Next (lower): Military Service Medal (Foreign military awards precedence vary)

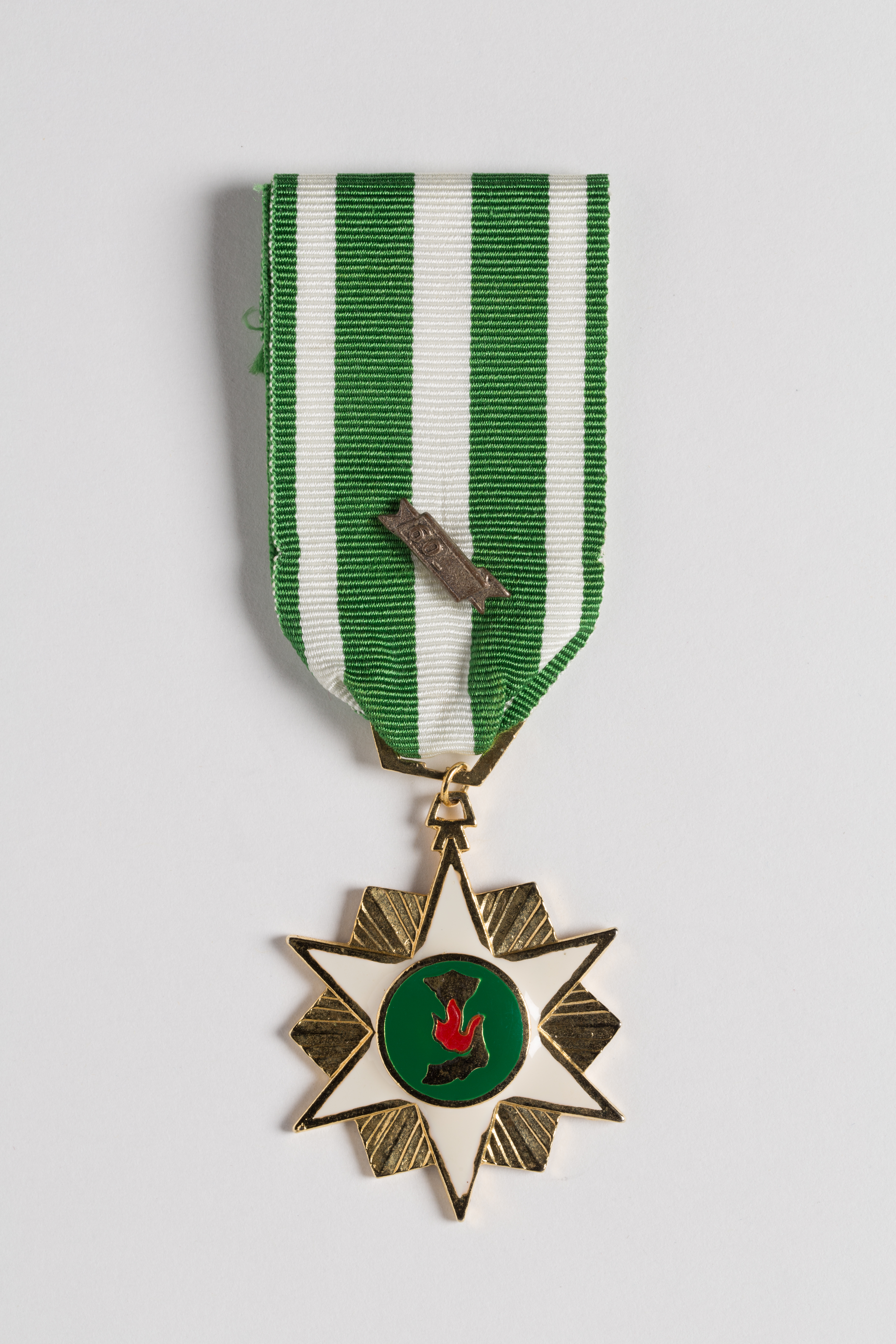
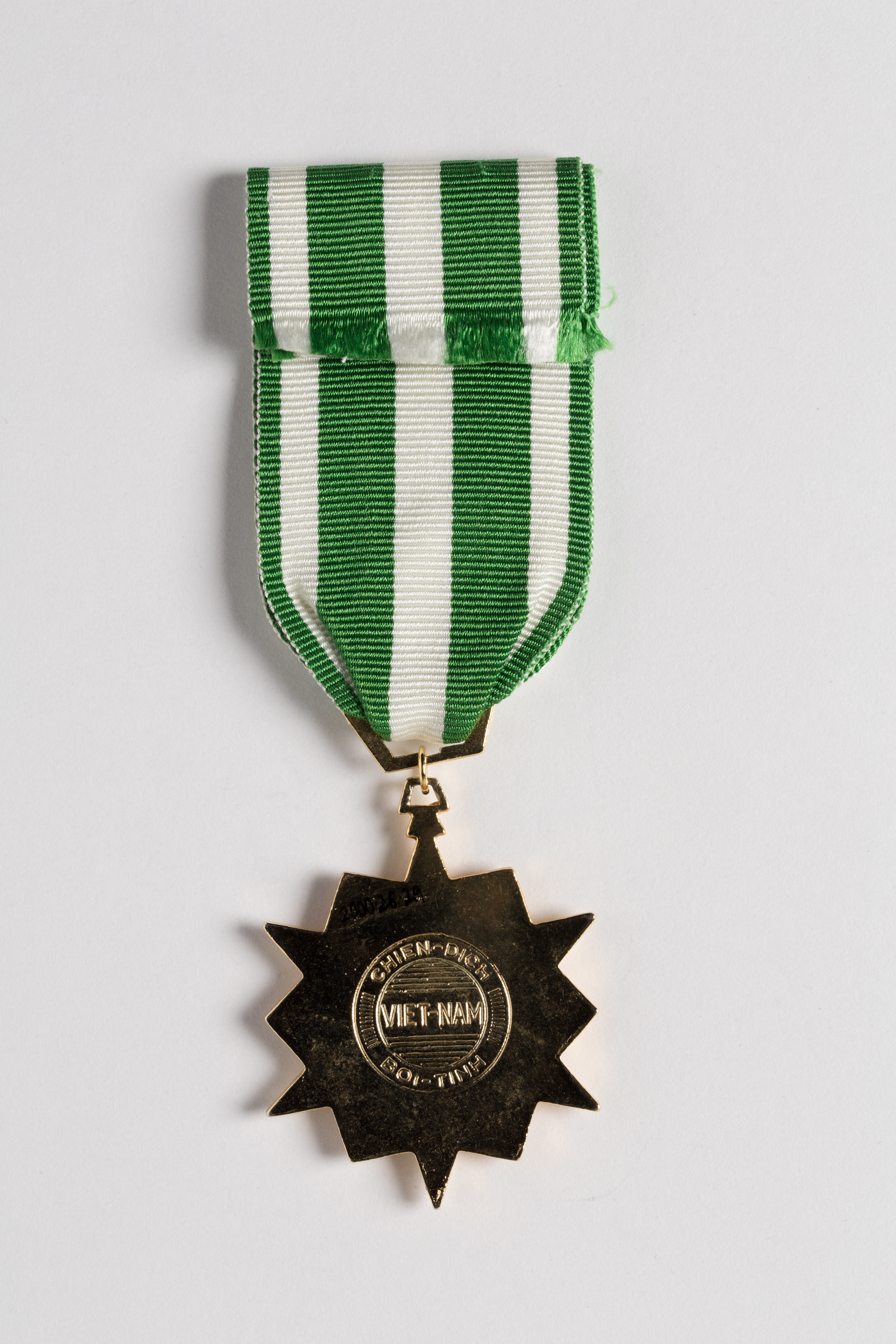
Photographs of a Vietnam Campaign Medal

The Republic of Vietnam Campaign Medal, also known as the Vietnam Campaign Medal (Vietnamese: Chiến Dịch Bội Tinh), is a South Vietnamese military campaign medal which was created in 1949 and awarded during the First Indochina War. During the Vietnam War (Second Indochina War), the South Vietnamese government awarded the Republic of Vietnam Campaign Medal with Device (1960– ) to members of the South Vietnamese military for wartime service and on 24 March 1966, to members of the U.S. military for support of operations in Vietnam. (Note: Code of Federal Regulations, Title 32, 1 January 1968: Chapter 1, Part 47, Republic of Vietnam Campaign Medal and Device (1960– ), pp. 47–49) In May 1966, other allied foreign military personnel became eligible for the award.

The medal was awarded for two different periods of service in Vietnam. The first period for the award was from 8 March 1949 to 20 July 1954. The second period was from 1 January 1960 to the end of the Vietnam War (the date was to be given when the war ended and North Vietnam was defeated). On 30 April 1975, Saigon was captured by the North Vietnamese army and South Vietnam surrendered and disbanded. The medal was not awarded after 28 March 1973, when the last U.S. troops left South Vietnam in accordance with the Paris Peace Accords.

== Award criteria ==
=== First Indochina War ===
The Republic of Vietnam Campaign Medal was created by the said Republic in 1949 and manufactured in France. The French soldiers engaged alongside the South Vietnamese were a priori eligible but were not authorized to wear this medal which duplicated the French commemorative medal and the Colonial Medal with "Extrême-Orient" clasp.

The "1949-1954" bar to be placed on the ribbon, was created later by Memorandum 2655 of the Armed Forces of the Republic of Vietnam of 8 October 1965 to distinguish the first conflict known as the "Indochina War" from the second started in 1960 and referred to as the "Vietnam War".

=== Second Indochina War (Vietnam War) ===
During the Vietnam War, the Republic of Vietnam Campaign Medal with Device (1960–) was manufactured in the United States and governed by Republic of Vietnam Decrees No. 149/SL/CT of 12 May 1964 and No 205/CT/LDQG/SL of 2 December 1965. The medal was established by the Republic of Vietnam Armed Forces Order No. 48, 24 March 1966. The medal was awarded to military personnel, both South Vietnamese for twelve months wartime service in the field, and allied foreign military who had directly participated for six months in "a large-scale military campaign during certain periods of time". All RVN and foreign personnel who served less than six months must meet the following requirements: were wounded by a hostile force; were captured by hostile forces, but later escaped, were rescued, or released; or were killed in action or otherwise in the line of duty. Awarded in a single class, the medal was awarded under the authority of the Chief of the Joint General Staff, Republic of Vietnam Armed Forces.

==== United States ====
Public Law 88–257 permitted U.S. military personnel to accept the medal for service performed in Vietnam from 1 March 1961 to 28 March 1973, inclusive. From March 1966 to March 1973, the medal was also awarded to any service member who, while serving outside the geographical limits of the Republic of Vietnam, contributed direct combat support to the Republic of Vietnam Armed Forces for six months. This stipulation most often applied to members who performed Vietnam War support from the 7th Fleet (all members of the fleet serving off the coast of Vietnam), Thailand and Guam (air crews if aircraft out of Thailand and Guam; not ground support staff), and Japan. In such cases, a U.S. service member needed meet the criteria established for the Armed Forces Expeditionary Medal (Vietnam) or Vietnam Service Medal during the period of service required to qualify for the Republic of Vietnam Campaign Medal.

Personnel assigned in the Republic of Vietnam on 28 January 1973 needed to meet one of the following: serve a minimum of 60 days in the Republic of Vietnam as of that date; complete a minimum of 60 days service in the Republic of Vietnam during the period from 28 January 1973 to 28 March 1973, inclusive.

==== Australia ====
The Republic of Vietnam Campaign Medal was awarded to Australian military personnel for service in South Vietnam during the period 31 July 1962 to 28 March 1973. The requirements for the award were: at least 181 days service, either continuous or aggregated, unless killed on active service (KIA); or wounded in action (includes psychological injury) and evacuated (medically evacuated other than being wounded does not meet requirement for medal); or captured and later released or escaped.

==== New Zealand ====
The Republic of Vietnam Campaign Medal was referred to as the "New Zealand Vietnamese Campaign Medal" (named the South Vietnamese Campaign Medal by the New Zealand Forces in South Vietnam). The medal was awarded to New Zealand Forces for service in Vietnam for six months between 1964 (arrived Vietnam June 1964) and 1973 (left Vietnam 22 December 1972). The medal was approved for wear in 1966.

== Appearance of medal ==
The Republic of Vietnam Campaign Medal is made of a gold colored metal in the shape of a 36 mm wide six-pointed white enameled star with six pointed gold rays between the arms of the star. In the center of the star is an 18 mm green colored disc bearing a gold colored map of Vietnam with three painted flames in red between North and South Vietnam, signifying the three regions of Vietnam. On the reverse of the medal is a circle bearing the inscription Chiến Dịch (Campaign) above and Bội Tinh (Medal) below the word VIET-NAM in the center. The suspension ribbon and service ribbon of the medal is green (to represent freedom) with three vertical white (to represent purity) stripes.

Ribbon devices

The Republic of Vietnam Armed Forces Memorandum 2655 (8 October 1965) authorized two sets of two silver-plated devices ( 1 13/64" wide and 19/32" wide) for the suspension ribbon of the medal, and service ribbon of the medal and the miniature medal suspension ribbon, to indicate two separate periods of struggle against communism in South Vietnam. Both sets of the devices if authorized, could be worn on the ribbons.

- Period 1: 8 March 1949 – 20 July 1954: The 1949–54 device is worn on the medal suspension ribbon and the 49–54 device is worn on the service ribbon of the medal and the miniature medal suspension ribbon. These devices are not authorized for wear by American military personnel.
- Period 2: 1 January 1960 – the end of the war: The 1960– device is worn on the medal suspension ribbon and the 60– device is worn on the service ribbon of the medal and the miniature medal suspension ribbon.

The unusual appearance was caused by the Republic of Vietnam government stating that the 1960– and 60– devices would show the dates of the Vietnam War from start to finish, with the ending year placed on the devices when the South Vietnamese had prevailed over the invading North Vietnam (the Democratic Republic of Vietnam) forces. However, on 30 April 1975, the South Vietnamese capital of Saigon was captured, and South Vietnam surrendered that day to the North Vietnamese army under the orders of General Duong Van Minh, who since 28 April was the president of South Vietnam.

== Order of wear ==
The Republic of Vietnam Campaign Medal is considered a foreign award by the United States, South Korean, Australian, and New Zealand governments. The equivalent award from the U.S. Armed Forces is known as the Vietnam Service Medal. The joint Australian and New Zealand campaign medal awarded for service in the Vietnam War is the Vietnam Medal, with the Australian support service being recognized by the Vietnam Logistic and Support Medal.

Country	Preceding	Following
South Vietnam; Order of precedence	Good Conduct Medal	Military Service Medal
United States; Order of precedence	Multinational Force and Observers Medal (Army); Inter-American Defense Board Medal (Navy/Marine Corps); Multilateral Organization Awards (Air Force)	Saudi Arabian Kuwait Liberation Medal
New Zealand; Worn in order of date of award Listed chronologically	Korean War Service Medal	Zimbabwe Independence Medal (Approved for restricted wear only)

== See also ==
- Orders, decorations, and medals of South Vietnam
