= Phở Ta =

Restaurant located in Ho Chi Minh City

Phở Ta (Vietnamese: Phở Ta) was a phở restaurant located in Ho Chi Minh City, Vietnam. It was notable for being owned by Madame Nguyễn Cao Kỳ (born Đặng Thị Tuyết Mai) and the ex-wife of General Nguyễn Cao Kỳ, who served as prime minister and vice president of the former South Vietnam. The restaurant opened September 9, 2009, on Lê Quý Đôn Street in the District 3, Ho Chi Minh City, but since was closed.
