= Battle of Saigon =

The Battle of Saigon may refer to several battles in the city of Saigon in Vietnam.

- French colonization of Vietnam battle

Siege of Saigon in 1859, leading to the capture of the city by the French Navy

- Divided Vietnam and Vietnam War battles

Battle of Saigon (1955), between the Vietnamese National Army and the Bình Xuyên crime syndicate
Battle of Saigon (1968), during the Tet Offensive of the Vietnam War
Fall of Saigon, the end of the Vietnam War in 1975

== Other battles in Saigon ==
- Lê Văn Khôi revolt, against Emperor Minh Mạng, starting in 1833
