= Madame Nguyễn =

Madame Nguyễn may refer to:

- Madame Thiệu Nguyễn, wife of Thiệu Nguyễn, former President of South Vietnam (1965–1975)
- Madame Kỳ Nguyễn, wife of Kỳ Nguyễn, former Prime Minister of South Vietnam (1965–1967)
- Định Nguyễn, former Vice President of Vietnam (1987–1992)
- Nguyễn Thị Bình, former Vice President of Vietnam (1992–2002)
