= Nguyễn Cao Kỳ =

Vice President of South Vietnam from 1967 to 1971

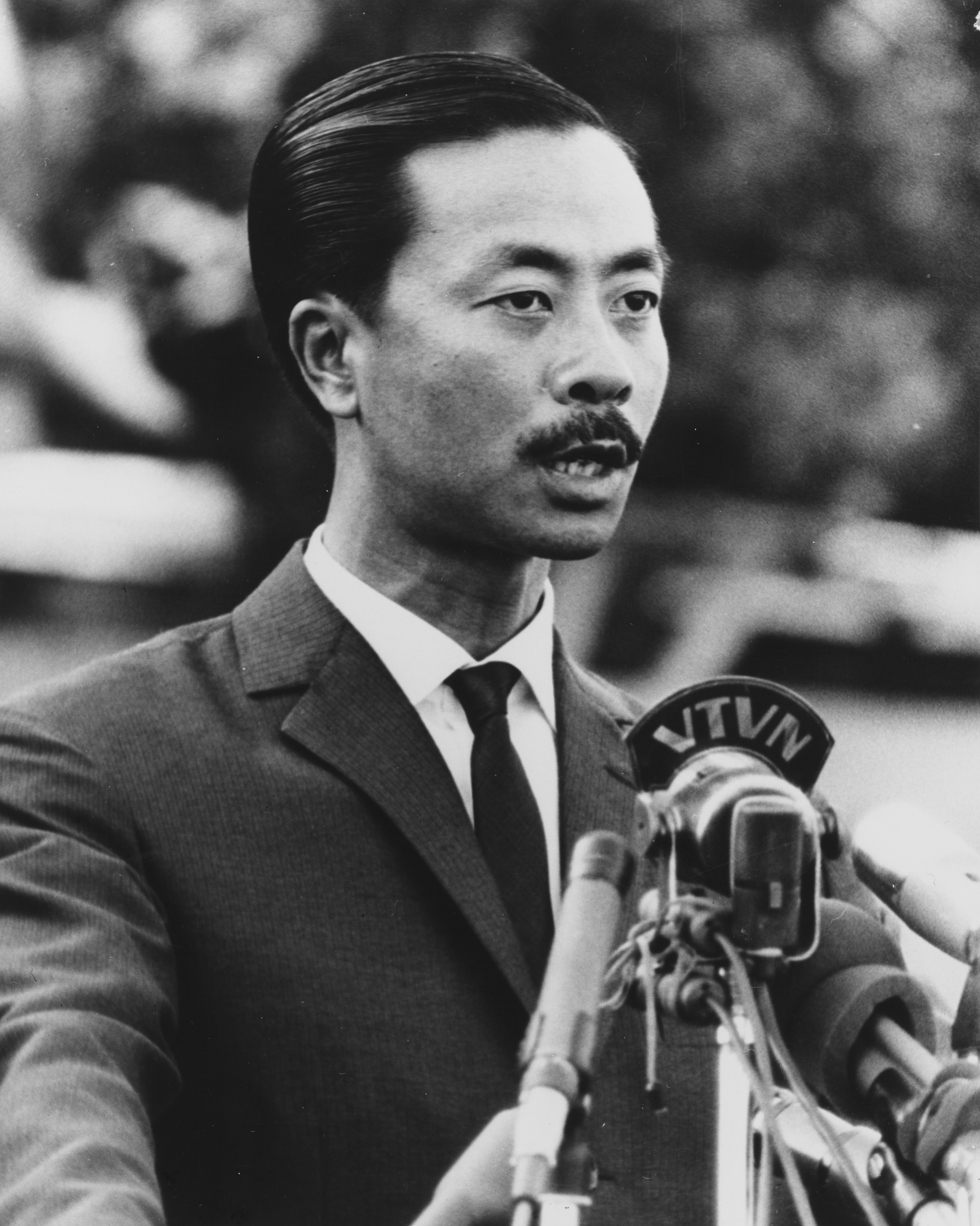
- Kỳ in 1966

2nd Vice President of South Vietnam
- In office 31 October 1967 – 29 October 1971
- President: Nguyễn Văn Thiệu
- Prime Minister: Nguyễn Văn Lộc (1967–1968); Trần Văn Hương (1968–1969); Trần Thiện Khiêm (1969–1971)
- Preceded by: Nguyễn Ngọc Thơ (1963)
- Succeeded by: Trần Văn Hương

Chairman of the Central Executive Committee of South Vietnam (5th Prime Minister)
- In office 19 June 1965 – 28 October 1967
- Deputy: Nguyễn Hữu Có; Nguyễn Lưu Viên
- Chairman of the National Leadership Committee: Nguyễn Văn Thiệu
- Preceded by: Phan Huy Quát
- Succeeded by: Nguyễn Văn Lộc

Chief of the Republic of Vietnam Air Force
- In office 1 December 1963 – 1 November 1967
- Deputy: Trần Văn Minh
- Preceded by: Đỗ Khắc Mai
- Succeeded by: Trần Văn Minh

Personal details
- Born: 8 September 1930 Sơn Tây, Tonkin protectorate
- Died: 23 July 2011 (aged 80) Kuala Lumpur, Malaysia
- Resting place: Rose Hills Memorial Park, Whittier, California, US
- Party: National Social Democratic Front
- Other political affiliations: Military
- Spouse: Đặng Tuyết Mai (m. 1964; div. 1989)
- Children: Nguyễn Cao Kỳ Duyên (daughter)

Military service
- Allegiance: State of Vietnam; Republic of Vietnam
- Branch/service: Republic of Vietnam Air Force
- Years of service: 1949–1971
- Rank: Major general; (Thiếu Tướng), Air Force commander
- Battles/wars: First Indochina War; Vietnam War; 1963 South Vietnamese coup d'état; September 1964 South Vietnamese coup attempt; February 1965 South Vietnamese coup attempt; Buddhist Uprising; Battle of Saigon (1968)

Nguyễn Cao Kỳ (Vietnamese: [ŋwiən˦ˀ˥ kaːw˧˧ ki˨˩]; 8 September 1930 – 23 July 2011) was a South Vietnamese military officer and politician who served as the chief of the Republic of Vietnam Air Force (RVNAF) in the 1960s, before leading the nation as the prime minister of South Vietnam in a military junta from 1965 to 1967. Then, until his retirement from politics in 1971, he served as vice president to bitter rival General Nguyễn Văn Thiệu, in a nominally civilian administration.

Born in Northern Vietnam, Kỳ joined the Vietnamese National Army of the French-backed State of Vietnam and started as an infantry officer before the French sent him off for pilot training. After the French withdrew from Vietnam and the nation was partitioned, Kỳ moved up the ranks of the Republic of Vietnam Air Force to become its leader. In November 1963, Kỳ participated in the coup that deposed president Ngô Đình Diệm and resulted in Diệm's assassination.

In 1964, Kỳ became prominent in junta politics, and was part of a group of young, aggressive officers dubbed the "Young Turks". Over the next two years, there were numerous successful and failed coup attempts. In September 1964, he helped put down a coup attempt by Generals Lâm Văn Phát and Dương Văn Đức against Nguyễn Khánh, and the following February he thwarted another attempt by Phát and Phạm Ngọc Thảo. His favored tactic was to send fighter jets into the air and threaten large-scale air strikes to force his opponents to back down. After the latter attempt, he also forced the Khánh into exile and became the leading member of the junta in mid-1965 by becoming prime minister, while General Thiệu was a figurehead chief of state. He gained notoriety for his flamboyant manner, womanizing, and risky and brash behavior, which deeply concerned South Vietnam's American allies and angered the Vietnamese public, many of whom regarded him as a "cowboy" and "hooligan". He cared little for public relations, and publicly made numerous controversial statements and threats.

Nevertheless, Kỳ and Thiệu were able to end the cycle of coups, and the Americans backed their regime. In 1966 Kỳ decided to purge rival General Nguyễn Chánh Thi from a command role, which provoked major unrest in Da Nang and Huế. He publicly threatened to kill the mayor of Đà Nẵng. Three months of large-scale demonstrations and riots paralyzed parts of the country, and after much maneuvering and some military battles, Kỳ's forces finally put down the uprising, and Thi was exiled, entrenching the former's grip on power.

In 1967, a transition to an elected government was scheduled, and after a power struggle within the military, Thiệu ran for the presidency with Kỳ as his running mate. To allow the two to work together, their fellow officers had agreed to have a military body controlled by Kỳ shape policy behind the scenes. The election was rigged to ensure that Thiệu and Kỳ's military ticket would win, and strong executive powers meant that the junta, in effect, still ruled. Leadership tensions persisted, and Thiệu prevailed, sidelining Kỳ supporters from key positions. Thiệu then enacted legislation to restrict candidacy eligibility for the 1971 election, banning almost all would-be opponents; Kỳ and the rest withdrew as they expected the election to be fraudulent; Thiệu went on to win the election uncontested, while Kỳ retired. With the fall of Saigon, Kỳ fled to the United States. He continued to heavily criticize both the communists and Thiệu, and the former prevented him from returning. However, in 2004, he became the first South Vietnamese leader to return to Vietnam, calling for national reconciliation between communist government and overseas anti-communists.

== Early years and rising up the ranks ==
A northerner, Kỳ was born in Sơn Tây, a town west of Hanoi. After completing his secondary schooling in Chu Văn An High School, Hanoi, he enlisted in the French-backed Vietnamese National Army of the State of Vietnam in 1951 and was commissioned in the infantry after attending an officers training school. After a brief period in the field against the communist Viet Minh of Ho Chi Minh during the First Indochina War, the French military hierarchy sent Kỳ, then a lieutenant, to Marrakesh in Morocco to train as a pilot. Kỳ gained his wings on 15 September 1954. The French defeat at the Battle of Dien Bien Phu and the Geneva Conference ended the colonial presence in Indochina, and Kỳ came back to the new Republic of Vietnam (South Vietnam). The commander of a transport squadron, Kỳ was put in charge of Tan Son Nhut Air Base, the main aerial facility in the capital, Saigon. Kỳ then went to the United States to study for six months at the Air Command and Staff College at Maxwell Field, Alabama, where he learned to speak English. He returned to Vietnam and continued to rise up the ranks.

Kỳ began his association with the American covert operations community in 1961. While still ranked as a major commanding Tân Sơn Nhứt Air Base, he became the first pilot for South Vietnam's presidential liaison officer, which was organizing to infiltrate military intelligence teams into North Vietnam. He recruited pilots from his command for this intelligence program of the Central Intelligence Agency, and flew some of the missions himself after being trained by an expert pilot from Air America. At one point, Kỳ took the CIA's Saigon station chief, William Colby, for a demonstration low-level flight. Kỳ's flight training graduation gift for himself and his pilots was a flight to Singapore, where he purchased black flight suits, silk scarfs, and cigarette lighters for all hands. Colby was amused by his flight but unhappy with the selection of flashy attire.

Under the regime of Dương Văn Minh, whose coup Kỳ had supported, he was made an air marshal, replacing Colonel Đỗ Khắc Mai as head of the Republic of Vietnam Air Force.

== Rise to prominence in the junta ==
In January 1964, General Nguyễn Khánh deposed Minh, and it was under Khánh's one-year rule that Kỳ rose to become one of the leading powers in the junta. Having been demoted, disgruntled Generals Lâm Văn Phát and Dương Văn Đức launched a coup attempt against Khánh before dawn on 13 September, using ten Army of the Republic of Vietnam (ARVN) battalions that they had recruited. Their faction consisted mainly of Catholic elements. They took over the city without any firing, and used the national radio station to proclaim the deposal of Khánh's junta. There was little reaction from most of the military commanders. Kỳ had two weeks earlier promised to use his planes against any coup attempt, but there was no reaction to begin with.

Some time after the plotters had made their broadcast, Kỳ consolidated the troops on Saigon's outskirts at Tân Sơn Nhứt Air Base, the largest in the country and where the military was headquartered. He barricaded the soldiers into defensive positions and vowed a "massacre" if the rebels attacked the base. A stand-off of tanks and troops around the perimeter of the base occurred, but it petered away without any violence as the rebels were withdrawn. Kỳ had apparently been angered by comments made by a rebel source who claimed that he was part of the coup attempt. At the same time, Kỳ was known for his hawkish attitude and close relations with the US military establishment in Vietnam, and American opposition to the coup was thought to have been conveyed to him efficiently. Đức mistakenly thought that Kỳ and his subordinates would be joining the coup, but was wrong.

The announcement of US support for the incumbent helped to deter ARVN officers from joining Lâm and Đức. Khánh returned to Saigon and put down the putsch, aided mainly by Kỳ and the Air Force. Kỳ decided to make a show of force as Phát and Đức began to wilt, and he sent jets to fly low over Saigon and finish off the rebel stand. He also sent two C-47s to Vũng Tàu to pick up two companies of South Vietnamese marines who remained loyal to Khánh. Several more battalions of loyal infantry were transported into Saigon. Kỳ's political star began to rise.

As the coup collapsed, Kỳ and Đức appeared with other senior officers at a news conference where they proclaimed that the South Vietnamese military was united, and announced a resolution by the armed forces, signed by them and seven other leading commanders, claiming a united front against corruption. The officers contended that the events in the capital were misinterpreted by observers, as "there was no coup." Kỳ claimed that Khánh was in complete control and that the senior officers involved in the standoff "have agreed to rejoin their units to fight the Communists", and that no further action would be taken against those who were involved with Đức and Phát's activities, but Khánh arrested them two days later.

Kỳ and Nguyễn Chánh Thi's role in putting down the attempted coup gave them more leverage in Saigon's military politics. Indebted to Kỳ, Thi, and other young officers for maintaining his hold on power, Khánh was now weaker. Kỳ's group called on Khánh to remove "corrupt, dishonest, and counterrevolutionary" officers, civil servants, and exploitationists, and threatened to remove him if he did not enact their proposed reforms. Some observers accused Kỳ and Thi of deliberately orchestrating or allowing the plot to develop before putting it down in order to embarrass Khánh and allow himself to gain prominence on the political stage. In later years, Cao Huy Thuần, a professor and Buddhist activist based in Đà Nẵng, claimed that during a meeting with Kỳ and Thi a few days before the coup, the officers had discussed their plans for joining a coup against Khánh.

=== December 1964 South Vietnamese coup ===
Kỳ was part of a group of younger officers called the Young Turks. The most prominent members, apart from himself, included IV Corps commander General Nguyễn Văn Thiệu, commander of I Corps Thi and Admiral Chung Tấn Cang, the head of the Republic of Vietnam Navy. They, and Khánh, wanted to forcibly retire officers with more than 25 years of service as they thought them to be lethargic, out of touch, and ineffective. The unspoken and most important reason, however, was that they viewed the older generals as rivals for power and wanted to conceal this real motive. Specific targets of this proposed policy were Generals Minh, Trần Văn Đôn, Lê Văn Kim and Mai Hữu Xuân.

The signature of Chief of State Phan Khắc Sửu was required to pass the ruling, but he referred the matter to the High National Council (HNC), a junta-appointed civilian advisory body, to get their opinion. The HNC turned down the request. On 19 December, the generals dissolved the HNC and arrested some of the members as well as other civilian politicians, and the older generals, who were removed from the military. The actual arrests were made by a small force commanded by Thi and Kỳ. The deposal prompted US Ambassador Maxwell D. Taylor to angrily berate Thiệu, Thi, Kỳ, and Cang in a private meeting and threaten to cut off aid if they did not reverse their decision. Kỳ later admitted to being stung by Taylor's comments. However, this galvanized the officers around the embattled Khánh for a time, and they ignored Taylor's threats without repercussions as the Americans were too intent on defeating the communists to cut funding.

In January 1965, the junta-appointed prime minister, Trần Văn Hương, introduced a series of measures to expand the anticommunist war effort, notably by widening the terms of conscription. This provoked widespread anti-Hương riots across the country, mainly from conscription-aged students and pro-negotiations Buddhists. Reliant on Buddhist support, Khánh did little to try to contain the protests. Khánh then decided to have the armed forces take over the government. On 27 January, Khánh removed Hương in a bloodless putsch with the support of Thi and Kỳ. He promised to leave politics once the situation was stabilized and hand over power to a civilian body. It was believed that some of the officers supported Khánh's increased power so as to give him an opportunity to fail and thus be removed permanently.

By this time, Taylor's relationship with Khánh had already broken down over the issue of the HNC, and the US became more intent on a regime change as Khánh was reliant on Buddhist support, which they saw as an obstacle to an expansion of the war. Knowing that he was close to being forced out, Khánh tried to start negotiations with the communists, but this only increased the plotting. In early February, Taylor told Kỳ, who then passed on the message to colleagues in the junta, that the United States was "in no way propping up General Khanh or backing him in any fashion." Taylor thought his message had been effective.

=== 1965–1967 ===
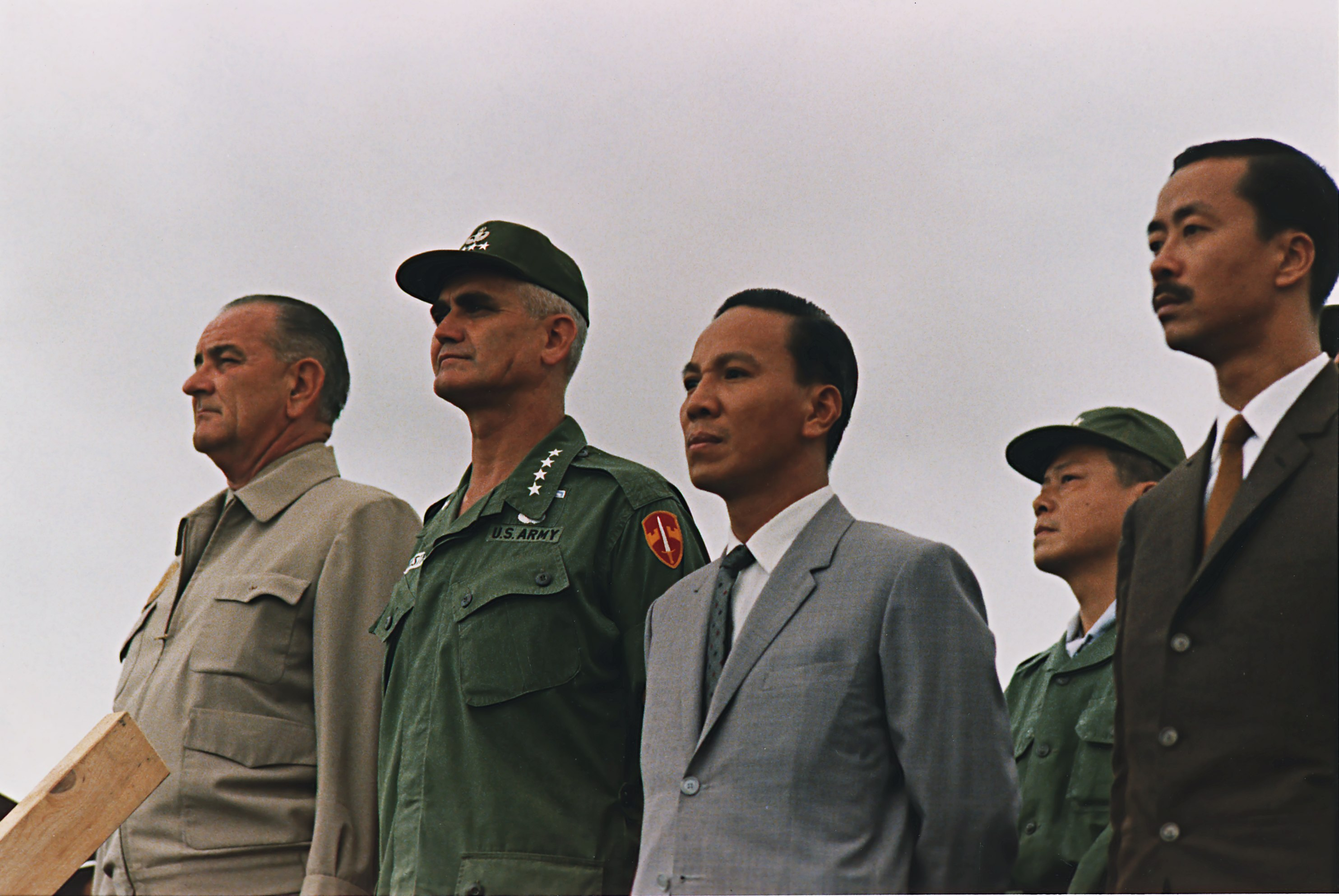
Kỳ (far right), US President Lyndon B. Johnson, General William Westmoreland, and President Nguyễn Văn Thiệu together in October 1966

On 8 February 1965, Kỳ led A-1 aircraft of the RVNAF from Đà Nẵng Airbase on a retaliatory raid against North Vietnamese targets, all of the aircraft were hit by anti-aircraft fire, but only one was shot down. Between January and February 1965, Colonel Phạm Ngọc Thảo, in reality a communist double agent, was locked in a power struggle with Khánh, and began plotting a coup against Khánh, who he thought was trying to kill him. Thảo consulted Kỳ—who wanted to seize power for himself—before the plot, and exhorted him to join the coup, but Kỳ claimed he would remain neutral. Thảo thus had reason to believe that Kỳ would not intervene. Kỳ had been preparing his own coup plans for a fortnight and was strongly opposed to Thảo and Phát. Kỳ, Thiệu, Có and Cang were not yet ready to make a coup, and their preparations were well behind that of Thảo.

Shortly before noon on 19 February, Thảo and General Phát used around 50 tanks, and some infantry battalions, to seize control of the military headquarters, the post office, and the radio station of Saigon. He surrounded the home of Khánh and Gia Long Palace, the residence of head of state Phan Khắc Sửu. The troops also missed capturing Kỳ, who fled in a sports car with his wife and mother-in-law. Kỳ ended up at Tân Sơn Nhứt, where he ran into Khánh, and the pair flew off together, while some of their colleagues were arrested there.

Thảo made a radio announcement, stating that the sole objective of his military operation was to get rid of Khánh, whom he described as a "dictator", while some of his fellow rebels made comments extolling Diệm and indicating they would start a hardline Catholic regime. Phát was supposed to seize the Biên Hòa Air Base to prevent Kỳ from mobilising air power against them. The attempt to seize Biên Hòa failed, as Kỳ got there first and took control, before circling Tân Sơn Nhứt, threatening to bomb the rebels.

A CIA report and analysis written after the coup concluded that "Ky's command of the air force made him instrumental" in preventing Khánh from being overrun, "until Ky changed his mind" on Khánh's continuing hold on power. Most of the forces of the III and IV Corps surrounding the capital disliked both Khánh and the rebels and took no action.

The Americans decided that while they wanted Khánh out, they did not approve of Thảo and Phát, so they began to lobby Kỳ and Thi, the two most powerful officers outside Khánh, to defeat both sides. They unofficially designated Kỳ the duty of moderating between the coup forces and Khánh's loyalists, preventing bloodshed and keeping them apart until some further action was planned. Kỳ's work slowed the advance of several Khánh-loyalist units into the capital. During all of these moves, Kỳ's hand was strengthened by the mistaken belief of Khánh and his faction that the Air Force commander supported them.

At 8 p.m., Phát and Thảo met Kỳ in a meeting organised by the Americans, and insisted that Khánh be removed from power. The coup collapsed when, around midnight, loyal ARVN forces swept into the city from the south and some loyal to Kỳ from Biên Hòa in the north. Whether the rebels were defeated or a deal was struck with Kỳ to end the revolt in exchange for Khánh's removal is disputed, but most analysts believe the latter. Before fleeing, Thảo managed a final radio broadcast, stating that the coup had been effective in removing Khánh. This was not the case yet, but later in the morning, Kỳ and Thi led the Armed Forces Council in adopting a vote of no confidence in Khánh, and they assumed control of the junta.

On 14 March, during Operation Rolling Thunder, the RVNAF led by Kỳ participated in attacks on barracks on Hòn Gió island of North Vietnam. In May 1965, a military tribunal under Kỳ sentenced both Phát and Thảo, who had gone into hiding, to death in absentia. As a result, Thảo had little choice but to attempt to seize power from Kỳ in order to save himself. On 20 May, a half dozen officers and around 40 civilians, predominantly Catholic, were arrested on charges of attempting to assassinate Prime Minister Phan Huy Quát and kidnap Kỳ, among others. Several of the arrested were known supporters of Thảo and believed to be abetting him in evading the authorities. In July 1965, he was reported dead in unclear circumstances; an official report claimed that he died of injuries while on a helicopter en route to Saigon, after having been captured north of the city. However, it is generally assumed that he was hunted down and murdered or tortured to death on the orders of some officials in Kỳ's junta. In his memoirs, Kỳ claimed Thảo was jailed and "probably [died] from a beating."

On 19 June 1965 Kỳ was appointed prime minister by a special joint meeting of military leaders following the voluntary resignation of civilian president Phan Khắc Sửu and Prime Minister Phan Huy Quát, who had been installed by the military. South Vietnam's system of government shifted to that of a strong prime minister, with Thiệu becoming a figurehead president. Kỳ ended the cycle of coups that plagued South Vietnam following the overthrow of Diệm. Kỳ and Thiệu's military junta decided to inaugurate their rule by holding a "no breathing week". They imposed censorship, closed many newspapers that published material deemed unacceptable, and suspended civil liberties. They then sidelined the civilian politicians to a "village of old trees" to "conduct seminars and draw up plans and programs in support of government policy". They decided to ignore religious and other opposition groups "with the stipulation that troublemakers will be shot." The generals began to mobilize the populace into paramilitary organizations. After one month, Quang began to call for the removal of Thiệu because he was a member of Diệm's Catholic Cần Lao party, decrying Thiệu "fascistic tendencies", and claiming Cần Lao members were undermining Kỳ.

In February 1966, Kỳ attended the Honolulu summit where his talks with President Lyndon Johnson persuaded him that he now assert his authority as he believed he had the backing of the United States. After the overthrow of Khánh, South Vietnam had devolved into an alliance of warlords, becoming almost a feudal state with each corps commander ruling his area as a warlord, keeping most of the tax money for themselves and sending the rest to the government in Saigon. Knowing that the United States wanted political stability in South Vietnam, initially Kỳ was willing to accept this arrangement, but after hearing Johnson praise him as a strong leader at the Honolulu summit, he became convinced that the United States would back him if he asserted his authority against the corps commanders-cum-warlords. In particular, Kỳ wanted to bring down Thi, who ruled central South Vietnam as his own fiefdom.

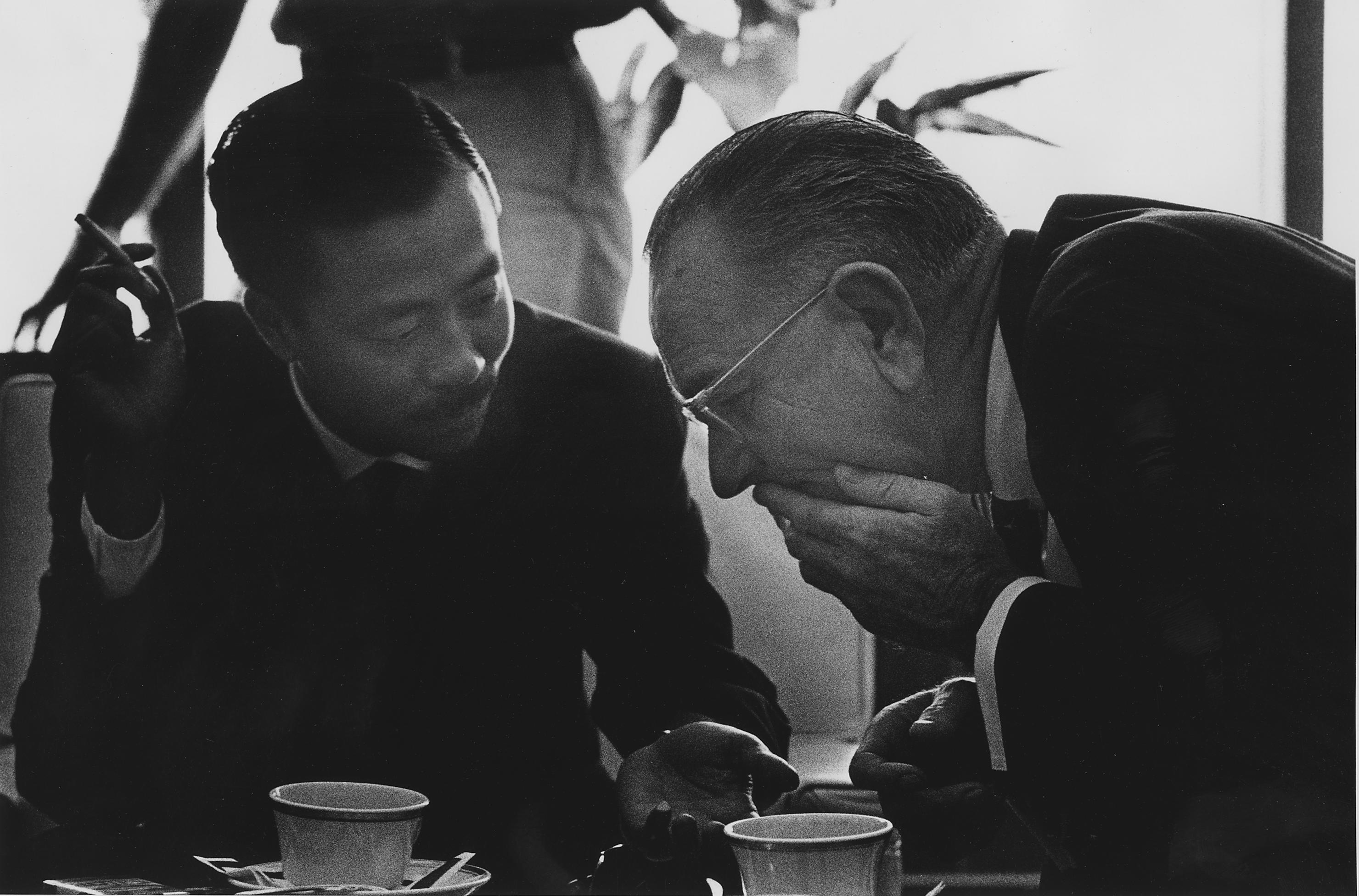
Kỳ with Lyndon Johnson during the Honolulu summit in Hawaiʻi in 1966

According to Alfred W. McCoy, Kỳ was the head of one of the three major South Vietnamese narcotics rings during this period, which also involved his sister and loyal military officers. McCoy States that this organization used the South Vietnamese Air Force to smuggle opium from Laos for Saigon's opium-smoking dens through South Vietnamese Customs. McCoy states that Kỳ's organization also controlled the Saigon port authority and taxed Corsican opium exports to Europe and Chinese opium and morphine shipments to Hong Kong.

=== Power struggle with Thi and Buddhist Uprising ===
Kỳ's greatest struggle came in 1966, when he dismissed Thi, resulting in a Buddhist Uprising and military revolt in Thi's I Corps. Within the junta, Thi was seen as Kỳ's main competitor for influence. Many political observers in Saigon thought that Thi wanted to depose Kỳ, and regarded him as the biggest threat to the other officers and the junta's stability. According to Kỳ's memoirs, Thi was a "born intriguer" who had "left-wing inclinations". Time magazine published a piece in February 1966 that claimed that Thi was more dynamic than Kỳ and could seize power at any time. Historian Robert Topmiller claimed Kỳ may have seen the article as destabilizing and therefore decided to move against Thi.

Historian Stanley Karnow said of Kỳ and Thi: "Both flamboyant characters who wore gaudy uniforms and sported sinister moustaches, the two young officers had been friends, and their rivalry seemed to typify the personal struggles for power that chronically afflicted South Vietnam. But their dispute mirrored more than individual ambition." Both were known for the colorful red berets they wore. There were reports that Thi was showing insubordination towards Kỳ. The US military commander in Vietnam, General William Westmoreland, said that Thi once refused to report to Kỳ in Saigon when requested. On one occasion, Kỳ came to I Corps to remonstrate with him in early March, Thi addressed his staff and asked mockingly, "Should we pay attention to this funny little man from Saigon or should we ignore him?" Thi made this comment rather loudly, within earshot of Kỳ, and the Vietnamese politician Bùi Diễm thought that the prime minister viewed Thi's comment as a direct challenge to his authority.

A native of central Vietnam, Thi was the commander of I Corps, which oversaw the five northernmost provinces of South Vietnam and the 1st and 2nd Divisions. He was known to have the "deep rooted" loyalty of his soldiers. A large segment of the South Vietnamese military was the Regional and Popular Forces, which were militias who served in their native areas, and they appreciated a commander with a regionalistic rapport. The support from the Buddhists, his troops, and the regional tendencies gave Thi a strong power base and made it hard for the other generals and the Americans to move against him.

Time magazine reported that Thi "ran it [I Corps] like a warlord of yore, obeying those edicts of the central government that suited him and blithely disregarding the rest." Historian George McTurnan Kahin said that Kỳ may have feared that Thi would secede from Saigon and turn central Vietnam into an independent state. CIA analyst Douglas Pike, speculated that this would have been a large part of Ky's thinking. A combination of those factors resulted in Thi's dismissal. Kỳ mustered the support of eight of the generals on the 10-man junta, meaning that along with his vote, there were nine officers in favor of Thi's removal. With Thi the only nonsupporter, Kỳ and his colleagues removed Thi from the junta and his corps command on 10 March 1966. Kỳ threatened to resign if the decision was not unanimous, claiming that the junta needed a show of strength, so Thi decided to vote for his own sacking. The junta put Thi under house arrest pending his departure from the country, and then appointed General Nguyễn Văn Chuẩn, the erstwhile commander of 1st Division and a Thi subordinate, as the new I Corps commander.

Kỳ initially stated that Thi was leaving the country to receive medical treatment for his nasal passages. An official announcement said that the junta "had considered and accepted General Thi's application for a vacation". Thi retorted that "The only sinus condition I have is from the stink of corruption." Kỳ then gave a series of reasons for dismissing Thi, accusing him of being too left-wing, of ruling the central regions like a warlord, of having a mistress who was suspected of being a communist, and being too conspiratorial. Despite Thi's good relations with the Buddhists in his area, most notably Thích Trí Quang, Kỳ reportedly had the monks' support for Thi's removal. Quang used the crisis to highlight Buddhist calls for civilian rule. There were claims that Quang intended to challenge Kỳ, regardless of whether or not Thi had been cast aside.

The Americans were supportive of Kỳ and his prosecution of the war against the communists, and they opposed Thi, regarding him as not being firm enough against communism. Thi did, however, have the support of Marine Lieutenant General Lewis Walt, who commanded American forces in I Corps and was the senior adviser to Thi's ARVN forces. This caused problems during the dispute. The dismissal caused widespread demonstrations in the northern provinces. Civil unrest grew, as civil servants, disaffected military personnel, and the working under-class joined the anti-government demonstrations led by the Buddhists. At first, Kỳ tried to ignore the demonstrations and wait for them to peter out, but the problem escalated and riots broke out in some places. Despite continued American support, senior American foreign policy officials regarded Kỳ, General Thiệu and their regime as of very poor quality. Assistant Secretary of State William Bundy stated that the regime "seemed to all of us the bottom of the barrel, absolutely the bottom of the barrel."

Kỳ gambled by allowing Thi to return to I Corps, ostensibly to restore order. He claimed he allowed Thi to return to his old area of command as a goodwill gesture, to keep central Vietnamese happy, and because he promised Thi a farewell visit before going into exile. Thi received a rousing reception and the anti-Kỳ protesters became more fervent. Kỳ then sacked the police chief of Huế, a Thi loyalist. The local policemen responded by going on strike and demonstrating against their chief's removal.

Buddhists and other antijunta civilian activists joined with I Corps units supportive of Thi to form the Struggle Movement, leading to civil unrest and a halt in I Corps military operations. On 3 April, Kỳ held a press conference during which he claimed that Đà Nẵng was under communist control and vowed to stage a military operation to regain the territory, thus implying the Buddhists were communist agents. He vowed to kill the mayor of Đà Nẵng, saying "Either Da Nang's mayor is shot or the government will fall." The following evening, Kỳ deployed three battalions of marines to Đà Nẵng. The marines stayed at Đà Nẵng Air Base and made no moves against the rebels. Soon after, they were joined by two battalions of Vietnamese Rangers, as well as some riot police and paratroopers. Kỳ took personal command and found that the roads leading into the city had been blocked by Buddhist civilians and pro-Thi portions of the I Corps. After a standoff, Kỳ realized that he could not score a decisive victory and had lost face. He arranged a meeting and media event with Thi loyalist officers, and various Struggle Movement supporters.

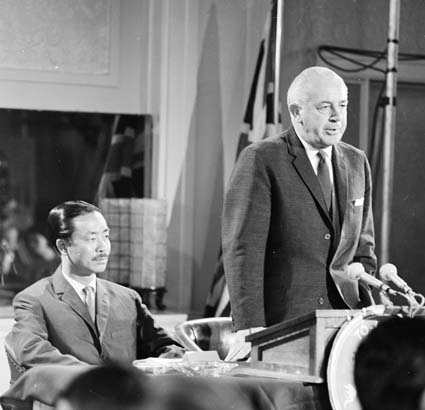
Kỳ with Prime Minister Harold Holt on his controversial 1967 visit to Australia

Kỳ arrived back in Saigon, where he met with Buddhist leaders for negotiations. The Buddhists demanded an amnesty for rioters and mutinous soldiers, and for Kỳ to withdraw the marines from Đà Nẵng back to Saigon. The monks said they would order the Struggle Movement "temporarily suspend all forms of struggle to prove our goodwill". After a period of tension and further tensions, Kỳ's forces gained the upper hand in May, pressuring most Struggle Movement members to give up and militarily defeating the rest. He then put Quang under house arrest and finally had Thi exiled, cementing his junta's grip on power and ending the Buddhist movement as a political force.

During his rule, Kỳ made many foreign state visits to bolster South Vietnam's legitimacy. One visit to Australia in 1967 was somewhat controversial. Over time, Australian attitudes toward South Vietnam became increasingly negative, despite a contribution of ground troops to assist the fight against the communists; the bipartisanship of the 1950s evaporated. The centre-left Australian Labor Party became more sympathetic to the communists and their leader, Arthur Calwell, stridently denounced Kỳ as a "fascist dictator" and a "butcher" ahead of his 1967 visit. Despite the controversy leading up to the visit, Kỳ's trip was a success. He dealt with the media effectively, despite hostile sentiment from some sections of the press and public.

During the trip to Australia, a power struggle with General Nguyễn Hữu Có, the deputy prime minister and defense minister, climaxed. Kỳ saw Có as a political threat and a magnet for dissidents, while Có deemed Kỳ to be "immature". At the same time as his visit to Australia, Kỳ sent Có to Taiwan, ostensibly to represent the junta at a ceremonial event. With Có out of the country and unable to stage a coup, and Kỳ not within striking distance in case anyone wanted to capture him, news of Có's removal was broken in Saigon. Có expressed a desire to return to Saigon, but was threatened with arrest and trial, and soldiers were deployed to the airport. Có was allowed to return in 1970 after Kỳ's power had waned.

== Views ==
Kỳ did not value democracy and believed that authoritarianism was necessary for South Vietnam to survive, a view shared with many of his fellow generals. In 1965, Kỳ told the journalist Brian Moynahan: "People ask me who my heroes are. I have only one: Hitler". Kỳ's comment that Hitler was his hero caused much controversy; although Kỳ had meant that his admiration was based on a view that Hitler had swiftly rebuilt Germany from a defeated state, something Kỳ also desired for South Vietnam, it nonetheless instantly damaged his international image. In an attempt at damage control, the administration of President Johnson denied to the American media that Kỳ had made the remark, claiming it was a fabrication by Moynahan, only to have the air marshal defiantly repeat the statement that Hitler was his only hero. Regarding the upcoming 1967 elections, Kỳ said that if the person elected is "a Communist or a Neutralist, I am going to fight him militarily. In any democratic country you have the right to disagree with the views of others."

In a 1965 interview with American journalist James Reston, Reston summarised that Kỳ believed that the Communists were "closer to the people's yearning for social justice and an independent life" than his own government was.

== 1967 elections ==
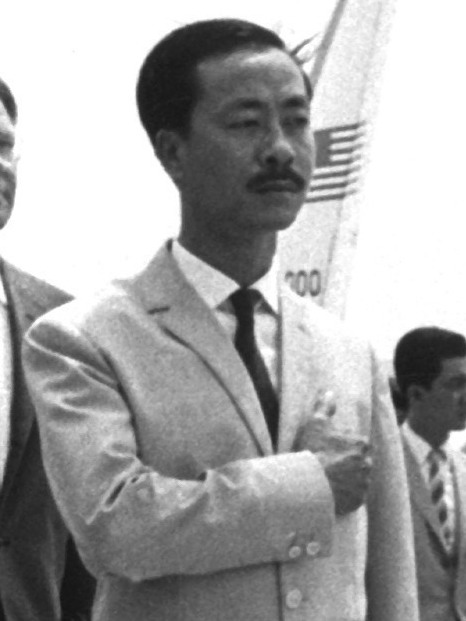
Kỳ in March 1967

In the presidential election that was held in 1967, the military junta, which Kỳ chaired, intended to endorse only one candidate for the presidency. Kỳ intended to run, but at the last minute changed his mind and backed Thiệu, a move he later called "the biggest mistake of my life." Thiệu nominated Kỳ as his running mate and the two were elected with 35 percent of the vote in a rigged poll. US policymakers heard rumors that the generals had agreed to subvert the constitution, and The New York Times revealed the formation of a secret military committee that would control the government after the election. What had happened was that in the negotiations within the military, Kỳ had agreed to stand aside in exchange for behind-the-scenes power through a military committee that would shape policy and control the civilian arm of the government. Kỳ flatly denied these reports to Ambassador Ellsworth Bunker, and the US Embassy notified Washington that The New York Times story was baseless. However, the story was later vindicated, as intelligence sources obtained the charter that told of the functions of the secret Supreme Military Committee (SMC). Walt Rostow briefed President Johnson and concluded that the SMC was "in effect, a scheme for 'guided democracy' in which a half dozen generals would decide finally what was good and bad for the country."

The campaign was overshadowed by US media criticism of Kỳ and Thiệu's unfair electoral practices and sneaky tricks. All the candidates were scheduled to attend a rally at Quảng Trị in the far north of the country on 6 August. Owing to the security situation and the possibility of communist attacks, the politicians were transported to joint campaign events by the military, rather than being free to go to separate events as their strategy dictated. However, the Quảng Trị event had to be canceled after the candidates' plane landed 23 km away at an air base in Đông Hà. Believing that the mishap was a deliberate attempt to make them look chaotic and disorganized—Thiệu and Kỳ had decided not to attend rallies—the candidates boycotted the event and flew back to Saigon. There they denounced the government bitterly. The leading opposition candidate, Trần Văn Hương, claimed that Thiệu and Kỳ "purposefully arranged the trip to humiliate us and make clowns out of us." As air force chief, Kỳ had previously stranded opposition politicians on a trip to the Central Highlands. Kỳ and Thiệu maintained that no malice was involved, but their opponents did not believe it. None of the candidates made good on their threat to withdraw, but their strident attacks over the alleged dirty tricks dominated the media coverage of the election for a period.

The adverse publicity embarrassed Washington; instead of hearing reports about progress and good governance in South Vietnam, most reports focused on corruption and fraud. The heavy and negative coverage of the election provoked angry debate in the US Congress, criticising Kỳ's junta and Johnson's policies. Such sentiment came from both houses and political parties. On 10 August 57 members of the United States House of Representatives signed a statement condemning Kỳ's electoral malpractices and threatening a review of US policy in Vietnam.

Kỳ and Thiệu were reluctant to campaign and meet the populace as they saw such events as liabilities rather than opportunities to win over the public, and showed little interest in gaining popular support in any case, as they could always count on a rigging of the ballot. The CIA reported that the pair had no intention of participating on the arranged rallies with the civilian candidates because they felt that "possible heckling from the audience that would be too humiliating." Thiệu and Kỳ were correct; they made one public campaign appearance at a rally, where a very disapproving crowd in Huế assailed Kỳ as a "hooligan" and "cowboy leader". Kỳ and Thiệu decided to campaign indirectly by appearing at set piece ceremonial appointments, such as transferring land titles to peasants, as hostile elements from the general population were less likely to be present. Thiệu took a restrained and more moderate stance during the campaign toward the issue of democracy, while Kỳ, the public face of the ticket and the incumbent government, went on the attack, damaging the pair's image and supposed commitment to democracy. Kỳ did not hide his distaste for democracy or his opponents and "described the civilian candidates as 'ordure' [dirt, filth, excrement], 'traitors,' and 'destroyers of the national interest.'" He continued on to say that if his opponents continued to attack him, he would cancel the poll. In the accompanying senate election, Kỳ openly endorsed 11 slates, but only one was successful in gaining one of the six seats.

=== 1967–1971: vice president ===
Vice President Kỳ with other members of the cabinet, 1968

He served as vice president to Thiệu, although behind the scenes there was a fierce rivalry that left Kỳ marginalized. In the aftermath of the Tết Offensive, Thiệu enforced martial law and used the situation to consolidate his personal power. Kỳ's supporters in the military and the administration were quickly removed from power, arrested, or exiled, ending any hopes of Kỳ exerting any power through the SMC or elsewhere. Alienated from Thiệu, Kỳ intended to oppose him in the 1971 election, but Thiệu introduced laws to stop most of his rivals from running. Realizing that the poll would be rigged, Kỳ withdrew from politics. Thiệu ran unopposed and took 94 percent of the vote.

== Life in exile ==
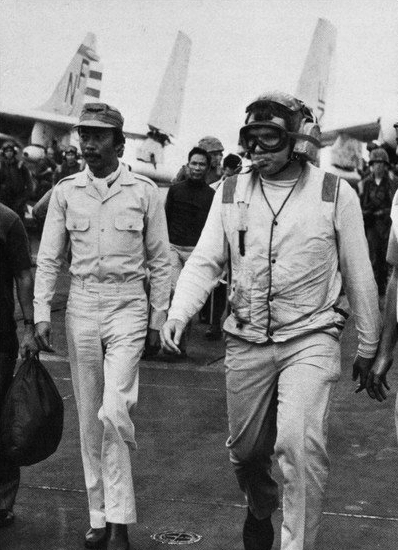
Kỳ aboard USS Midway during Operation Frequent Wind on 29 April 1975

External videos
- Booknotes interview with Nguyễn on Buddha's Child, July 14, 2002, C-SPAN

One day before the fall of South Vietnam to North Vietnam on 30 April 1975, Kỳ left Vietnam aboard the USS Blue Ridge and fled to the United States and settled in Westminster, California, where he ran a liquor store. Kỳ wrote two autobiographies, How We Lost the Vietnam War and Buddha's Child: My Fight to Save Vietnam.

Historian James McAllister openly questioned Kỳ's honesty, saying that Buddha's Child, as Kỳ called himself, "is filled with unverifiable conversations and arguments that do not at all correspond with the historical record. Like his earlier memoir, it is often a self-serving attempt to continue his ongoing feud with the late president Nguyễn Văn Thiệu." He said "with everything Ky writes about Vietnam . . . skepticism is in order."

Kỳ made headlines in 2004 by being the first South Vietnamese leader to return to Vietnam after the reunification, a move that was seen as a shameful one by many anticommunist groups in the Vietnamese American community. Kỳ had previously been critical of the Vietnamese government while in exile and had been denied a visa on several occasions. Upon setting foot on Vietnam, Kỳ defended his actions by saying that the Vietnam War was "instigated by foreigners, it was brothers killing each other under the arrangements by foreign countries."

He added, "In another 100 years, the Vietnamese will look back at the war and feel shameful. We should not dwell on it as it will not do any good for Vietnam's future. My main concern at the moment is Vietnam's position on the world map." Kỳ said that he only wanted to help build up Vietnam and promote national harmony, and assailed critics of his return, saying that "those who bear grudges only care about themselves."

Kỳ later returned to Vietnam permanently and campaigned for increased foreign investment. Kỳ was involved in organizing trips to Vietnam for potential US investors.

== Style ==
Kỳ was well known for his flamboyant, colorful conduct and dress during his younger days. His trademark fashion accessory before he faded from public view in the 1970s was a silk scarf, which he wore with his black flight suit. He often raised eyebrows when he was the military prime minister by arriving at events to meet civilians with his wife in matching black flight suits, boots, blue caps, and silk scarves. He rarely was seen without a cigarette. He was notorious for his love of gambling, women, and glamour, which made American officials wary of him. He was also obsessed with cock fighting, not only hosting such fights in his own house but even traveling to Viet Cong zones without an escort to find fights. One official called him an "unguided missile". When he was a young pilot, Kỳ once landed a helicopter in the road in front of a girlfriend's house in order to impress her, causing the locals to panic and earning the ire of his commander for misusing military equipment. On one occasion, Kỳ is said to have pulled a handgun on a journalist whose questions annoyed him. Many in the South Vietnamese public service, military, and some of the general public disliked his tempestuous and impetuous style and regarded him as a "cowboy". and a "hooligan". At his only public campaign appearance during the 1967 presidential election, the large crowd repeatedly heckled him loudly, calling him a "cowboy leader" and "hooligan" and as a result he did not make any more appearances at rallies.

Oriana Fallaci, who interviewed him in 1968, included him in The Egotists: Sixteen Surprising Interviews, as one of the few people who surprised and impressed her the most relative to their controversial public personas. In the interview, Kỳ decried the corruption and poverty of South Vietnam, lamented about the inability of the government and the United States to solve their problems, compared the Catholics to the Communists, and openly agreed with many of the social aims of Ho Chi Minh and the Viet Cong. When an astounded Fallaci asked if he considered himself on the wrong side, Ky said "Well yeah.... if my destiny had been different, I could have been on [Ho Chi Minh's] side". American officials were outraged by the interview, but Fallaci would praise him in her book as "the only possible leader in a country painfully poor in leaders. Yet he is. And you realize it, with astonishment, when you listen to him for more than ten minutes. The man is not stupid. He has something to say, and he says it without fear."

== Personal life ==
Kỳ met and married his first wife, a French woman, in the 1950s when he was training as a pilot in France. In the 1960s, he divorced her and married Đặng Tuyết Mai, an Air Viet Nam flight attendant, who was his spouse during his years in power. He later married for a third time. His daughter from his second marriage, Nguyễn Cao Kỳ Duyên, is well known in the overseas Vietnamese entertainment industry as a mistress of ceremonies and singer on the music variety show Paris By Night. Many Vietnamese Americans called for her sacking after her father returned to Vietnam.

== Death ==
Kỳ died on 23 July 2011, aged 80, at a hospital in Kuala Lumpur, Malaysia, where he was receiving treatment for "respiratory complications". He was survived by six children from his three marriages. His ashes are interred at the Buddhist Columbarium of Rose Hills Memorial Park in Whittier, California.

== Honours and decorations ==
=== National honours ===
- South Vietnam:
  - Grand Officer of the National Order of Vietnam
  - Military Merit Medal
  - Army Distinguished Service Order, First Class
  - Air Force Distinguished Service Order, First Class
  - Air Force Meritorious Service Medal
  - Special Service Medal
  - Vietnamese Gallantry Cross
  - Air Gallantry Cross, Gold wing
  - Wound Medal
  - Armed Forces Honor Medal, First Class
  - Leadership Medal
  - Vietnam Staff Service Medal, First Class
  - Vietnam Campaign Medal
  - Military Service Medal, Second Class
  - Vietnam Air Service Medal, First Class

=== Foreign honours ===
- Taiwan :
  - Special Grand Cordon of the Order of Brilliant Star
- Malaysia :
  - Honorary Grand Commander of the Order of the Defender of the Realm (S.M.N.) (1965)
- Thailand :
  - Knight Grand Cross of the Order of the White Elephant (1965)
- USA :
  - Presidential Unit Citation (Air Force)
  - United States Air Force Pilot Badge

== Sources ==
- Conboy, Kenneth J.; Andradé, Dale (2000). Spies and Commandos: How America Lost the Secret War in North Vietnam. Lawrence, Kansas: University Press of Kansas. ISBN 978-0-7006-1002-0.
- Dougan, Clark; et al. (1983). Nineteen Sixty-Eight. Boston, Massachusetts: Boston Publishing Company. ISBN 0-939526-06-9.
- Edwards, P. G. (1997). A Nation at War: Australian Politics, Society and Diplomacy During the Vietnam War 1965–1975. Allen & Unwin. ISBN 1-86448-282-6.
- Hammer, Ellen J. (1987). A Death in November: America in Vietnam, 1963. New York City: E. P. Dutton. ISBN 0-525-24210-4.
- Hoang Ngoc Lung (1978). The General Offensives of 1968–69. McLean, Virginia: General Research Corporation.
- Fallaci, Oriana (1968). The Egotists: Sixteen Surprising Interviews. Chicago: H. Regnery Co. ISBN 9789990898965.
- Kahin, George McTurnan (1986). Intervention: How America Became Involved in Vietnam. New York City, New York: Alfred A. Knopf. ISBN 978-0394543673.
- Karnow, Stanley (1997). Vietnam: A history. New York City, New York: Penguin Books. ISBN 0-670-84218-4.
- Langguth, A. J. (2000). Our Vietnam: the war, 1954–1975. New York City: Simon & Schuster. ISBN 0-684-81202-9.
- McAllister, James (November 2004). ""A Fiasco of Noble Proportions": The Johnson Administration and the South Vietnamese Elections of 1967". The Pacific Historical Review. 73 (4). Berkeley, California: University of California Press: 619–651. doi:10.1525/phr.2004.73.4.619.
- Moyar, Mark (2004). "Political Monks: The Militant Buddhist Movement during the Vietnam War". Modern Asian Studies. 38 (4). New York City: Cambridge University Press: 749–784. doi:10.1017/S0026749X04001295. S2CID 145723264.
- Moyar, Mark (2006). Triumph Forsaken: The Vietnam War, 1954–1965. New York City: Cambridge University Press. ISBN 0-521-86911-0.
- Nguyễn Cao Kỳ (1976). Twenty Years and Twenty Days. New York: Stein and Day. Published in paperback as How We Lost the Vietnam War (Stein and Day, 1984).
- Penniman, Howard R. (1972). Elections in South Vietnam. Washington, D.C.: American Enterprise Institute for Public Policy Research.
- Shaplen, Robert (1966). The Lost Revolution: Vietnam 1945–1965. London: André Deutsch.
- Topmiller, Robert J. (2006). The Lotus Unleashed: The Buddhist Peace Movement in South Vietnam, 1964–1966. Lexington, Kentucky: University Press of Kentucky. ISBN 0-8131-9166-1.
- Trương Như Tảng (1986). Journal of a Vietcong. London: Cape. ISBN 0-224-02819-7.
- VanDeMark, Brian (1991). Into the Quagmire: Lyndon Johnson and the Escalation of the Vietnam War. New York City, New York: Oxford University Press. ISBN 0-19-509650-9.

Military offices
| Preceded by Do Khac Mai | Commander Republic of Vietnam Air Force; 1963–1965 | Succeeded by Trần Văn Minh |
Political offices
| Preceded by Phan Huy Quát | Prime Minister of the Republic of Vietnam; 1965–1967 | Succeeded by Nguyễn Văn Lộc |
| Preceded by Nguyễn Ngọc Thơ (in 1963) | Vice President of the Republic of Vietnam; 1967–1971 | Succeeded by Trần Văn Hương |
