= John Chaisson =

U.S. Marine Corps general (1916–1972)

John Robert Chaisson
- Born: September 27, 1916
- Died: September 20, 1972 (aged 55); Swampscott, Massachusetts, U.S.
- Burial place: Arlington National Cemetery
- Military career
- Allegiance: United States
- Branch: United States Marine Corps
- Service years: 1940–1972
- Rank: Lieutenant general
- Conflicts: World War II; Vietnam War
- Awards: Distinguished Service Medal (2); Silver Star; Legion of Merit with Combat "V" and one gold Star in lieu of a second award Bronze Star Medal with Combat "V"; Navy Commendation Medal; American Defense Service Medal; American Campaign Medal; Asiatic-Pacific Campaign Medal with four bronze stars World War II Victory Medal; China Service Medal; National Defense Service Medal with one bronze star Korean Service Medal; Vietnam Service Medal with three bronze stars Vietnamese Cross of Gallantry; United Nations Service Medal; Republic of Vietnam Campaign Medal

John Robert Chaisson (27 September 1916 – 20 September 1972) was a United States Marine Corps Lieutenant general who served in World War II and the Vietnam War.

== Early life ==
Born 27 September 1916, in Swampscott, Massachusetts. He graduated from Swampscott High School in 1934. He completed a BA at Harvard College (June 1939) and attended Boston College Law School for one year.

== Military career ==
He enlisted in the United States Marine Corps Reserve in October 1940, and was assigned to the Officer Candidates School, Marine Corps Schools, Quantico, Virginia. He was appointed a Second lieutenant in the Marine Corps Reserve on 20 February 1941, and was commissioned in the regular Marine Corps on 4 August 1941.

At the outbreak of World War II, Lieutenant Chaisson was a battery officer with the 1st Battalion, 11th Marines, serving at Parris Island, South Carolina and New River, North Carolina.

His unit deployed in April 1942 and saw combat at Guadalcanal, New Guinea, New Britain and Peleliu campaigns. He was awarded the Legion of Merit with Combat "V" for outstanding service as Plans and Training Officer of the 1st Battalion, 11th Marines, 1st Marine Division, during the seizure of the Peleliu Airfield. He also earned the Bronze Star medal with Combat "V" for meritorious service as Artillery Observer of the 1st Battalion, 11th Marines, in action on Cape Gloucester, New Britain. He was promoted to Major in May 1943.

He returned to the United States in November 1944, and the following month was assigned to Marine Corps Schools, Quantico, where he completed the Instructors' Orientation Course and later served as Officer in Charge of the Course and Academic Inspector until April 1948.

Following this assignment, he deployed in June 1948 for Tsingtao, China, where he served as Assistant Chief of Staff, G-1, and Public Information Officer of Fleet Marine Force, Western Pacific, until March 1949. After a brief assignment with the 1st Marine Division at Camp Pendleton, California, he joined the Naval Reserve Officers Training Corps unit at Tufts College, Medford, Massachusetts, for a two-year tour as Officer Instructor. While serving as Officer Instructor, he was promoted to Lieutenant colonel in January 1951.

He reported to Headquarters Marine Corps in June 1951, where he served as Enlisted Coordinator, then as Head of the Enlisted Coordinator Section, Detail Branch, Personnel Department, until October 1953. Upon his detachment, he completed cold weather training with the Cold Weather Training Battalion, Bridgeport, California and embarked for duty in the Far East in December 1953.

In South Korea, he joined the 1st Marine Division, and served consecutively as Commander of the 4th Battalion, Assistant G-3 and Assistant Chief of Staff, G-3, from December 1953 until September 1954. For meritorious achievement while commanding the 4th Battalion in Korea, he was awarded the Navy Letter of Commendation.

In October 1954, he was assigned duties in Washington, D.C., as Special Assistant to the Assistant Secretary of the Navy (Personnel and Reserve Forces), and later, served as Special Assistant for Manpower Utilization and for Marine Corps Matters. In August 1957, he returned to Marine Corps Schools, where he completed the Senior School, then served successively as Chief, Landing Force Instruction Team, Advanced Base Problem Section; assistant director and later, Director of the Junior School until June 1961. While serving there, he was promoted to Colonel in March 1959.

From July 1961 until July 1963, he served as Fleet Marine Officer on the Staff of the Commander, Sixth Fleet. Upon his return to the United States, he began a tour of duty with the 2nd Marine Division, at Camp Lejeune, serving as Chief of Staff, Plans Officer and, again as Chief of Staff, until December 1965.

=== Vietnam War ===
He was assigned to South Vietnam in February 1966, and served there for 29 months. On 9 April 1966 while serving as G-3, III Marine Amphibious Force (III MAF) during the Buddhist Uprising in Da Nang he met with Colonel Dam Quang Yeu, commander of the Quảng Nam Special Sector, who supported the Buddhist Struggle Movement and was attempting to lead a convoy north from Hội An into the city. He warned Yeu that if the latter's troops continued their advance or shelled Danang Air Base, the Americans would consider it an attack upon themselves and would react accordingly. As Chaisson spoke, a flight of Marine F-8E Crusaders, armed with bombs and rockets, circled overhead. III MAF commander General Lew Walt ordered Marine artillery to lay one 155mm battery and two 8-inch howitzers on the rebel positions, but to fire only on his personal command. While the situation remained tense, Chaisson apparently convinced Yeu that aggressive action by the rebels would not be in anyone's best interests. Yeu contented himself with a show of force. Thirty minutes after Chaisson left to report back to Walt, Yeu ordered his artillery unit to return to Hội An, but he and the ARVN infantry stayed in place.

On 18 May Walt tasked him with securing the Hàn River bridge in Da Nang which was being contested between Struggle Movement forces and South Vietnamese Marines. He convinced the Vietnamese Marines to be replaced by US Marines, but was unable to convince the Struggle Movement forces similarly and so ordered US Marines to move amongst the Struggle Movement forces and sit down. He and Walt then attempted to convince the Struggle Movement commander not to blow up the bridge with them on it, the commander signaled for the demolition, but nothing happened. The charges were disarmed and the US Marines took control of the bridge.

In November 1966 he expressed his opposition to the proposed Strongpoint-obstacle-system along the Vietnamese Demilitarized Zone saying "All of the barrier plans are fantastic, absolutely impractical and III MAF is opposed to all because of engineer requirements... and the installations must tie down troops to protect the barrier."

He was awarded the Legion of Merit with Combat "V" for his service as Assistant Chief of Staff, G-3, III MAF.

Following his promotion to Brigadier general in November 1966, he was reassigned duty as Director, Combat Operations Center, Headquarters, MACV, replacing Brigadier General William K. Jones. He formed a close relationship with MACV commander General William Westmoreland and became his informal advisor on all Marine matters with a reputation for outspokenness. Commenting on the outcome of the Battle of Dak To he asked "Is it a victory when you lose 362 friendlies in three weeks and by your own spurious body count you only get 1,200?" In a press conference on 3 February 1968, he admitted that the Viet Cong had surprised the MACV command with the intensity and coordination of the Tet Offensive. For his role at MACV he earned the Distinguished Service Medal.

=== Post Vietnam ===
Detached in June 1968, he returned to Headquarters Marine Corps where he was assigned duty as Special Assistant to the Deputy Chief of Staff (Plans and Programs). He was promoted to Major general on 1 October 1968. Nominated for promotion to Lieutenant general by President Nixon, his nomination was confirmed by the Senate on 17 June 1970. He received his third star on 1 July 1970 and was designated Deputy Chief of Staff (Plans and Programs). In May 1971, he became Chief of Staff and served in this capacity until he retired from active duty. He earned a second award of the Distinguished Service Medal for his service at Headquarters Marine Corps, from July 1968 through July 1972. He had been expected to be appointed as Commandant of the United States Marine Corps, but Nixon instead appointed General Robert E. Cushman Jr.

He retired from active duty on 31 July 1972 and became deputy director of regulations for the Atomic Energy Commission. He died of a heart attack on 20 September 1972 while playing badminton at the Pentagon. He was survived by his wife Marguerite and their four children. He was buried at Arlington National Cemetery.

== Awards and decorations ==
His medals and decorations include: Distinguished Service Medal (2); the Silver Star; the Legion of Merit with Combat "V" and one gold Star in lieu of a second award; Bronze Star Medal with Combat "V"; the Navy Commendation Medal; Presidential Unit Citation (3); Navy Unit Commendation; American Defense Service Medal; American Campaign Medal; Asiatic-Pacific Campaign Medal with four bronze stars; World War II Victory Medal; China Service Medal; National Defense Service Medal with one bronze star; Korean Service Medal; Vietnam Service Medal with three bronze stars; the Vietnamese Cross of Gallantry; United Nations Service Medal; and Republic of Vietnam Campaign Medal.
