= Buddhist Uprising =

1966 unrest in South Vietnam

- Part of the Vietnam War
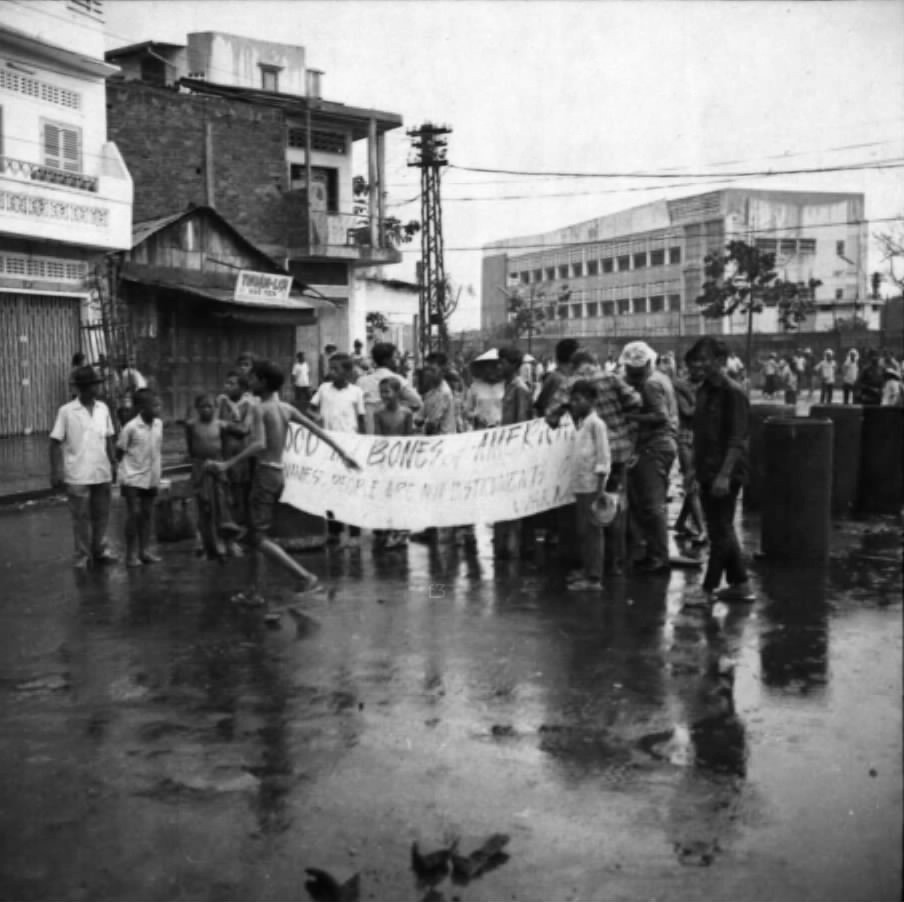
- Buddhist demonstration, Saigon, 22 May 1966
Date	March 26 – June 8, 1966 (2 months, 1 week and 6 days)
Location	Da Nang–Huế, South Vietnam
Result	South Vietnamese government victory

Belligerents
(South Vietnam) Republic Of Vietnam Government; Army Of Republic Of Vietnam; National Police	ARVN rebels Buddhist monks

Commanders and leaders
Nguyễn Văn Thiệu; Nguyễn Cao Kỳ; Nguyễn Ngọc Loan; Cao Văn Viên	Thích Trí Quang; Thích Tâm Châu; Thích Thiện Minh (WIA); Nguyễn Chánh Thi

Casualties and losses
- About 150 killed and over 700 wounded (including 23 Americans wounded)

The Buddhist Uprising of 1966 (Vietnamese: Nổi dậy Phật giáo 1966), or more widely known in Vietnam as the Crisis in Central Vietnam (Biến động Miền Trung), was a period of civil and military unrest in South Vietnam, mostly in the I Corps area in the north of the country in central Vietnam. The area is a center of Vietnamese Buddhism, and at the time, activist Buddhist monks and civilians were at the forefront of opposition to a series of military juntas that had been ruling the nation, as well as prominently questioning the escalation of the Vietnam War.

During the rule of the Catholic Ngô Đình Diệm, the perceived discrimination against the Buddhist population generated the growth of Buddhist institutions as they sought to participate in national politics and gain better treatment. In 1965, after a series of military coups that followed the fall of the Diệm regime in 1963, Air Marshal Nguyễn Cao Kỳ and General Nguyễn Văn Thiệu finally established a stable junta, holding the positions of Prime Minister and figurehead Chief of State respectively. The Kỳ-Thiệu regime was initially almost a feudal system, being more of an alliance of warlords than a state as each corps commander ruled his area as his own fiefdom, handing some of the taxes they collected over to the government in Saigon and keeping the rest for themselves. During that time, suspicion and tension continued between the Buddhist and Catholic factions in Vietnamese society.

The religious factor combined with a power struggle between Kỳ and General Nguyễn Chánh Thi, the commander of I Corps, a Buddhist local to the region and popular in the area. Thi was a strong-willed officer regarded as a capable commander, and Kỳ saw him as a threat, as did others within the junta. In February 1966, Kỳ attended a summit in Honolulu, where he became convinced that he now had American support to move against Thi, the strongest and most able of the corps commanders. In March 1966, Kỳ fired Thi and ordered him into exile in the United States under the false pretense of medical treatment. This prompted both civilians and some I Corps units to launch widespread civil protests against Kỳ's regime and halt military operations against Viet Cong. Kỳ gambled by allowing Thi to return to I Corps before departing for the US, but the arrival of the general to his native area only fuelled anti-Kỳ sentiment. The Buddhist activists, students and Thi loyalists in the military coalesced into the "Struggle Movement", calling for a return to civilian rule and elections. Meanwhile, Thi stayed in I Corps and did not leave; strikes and protests stopped civilian activity in the area, government radio stations were taken over and used for anti-Kỳ campaigning, and military operations ceased. Riots also spread to the capital Saigon and other cities further south.

At the start of April, Kỳ decided to move. He declared that Da Nang, the main centre in I Corps, was under communist control and publicly vowed to kill the mayor, who had expressed support for the Struggle Movement. Kỳ moved military forces into the city and travelled there to prepare for an assault, but had to withdraw and then start discussions with Buddhist leaders, as it was obvious that he was not strong enough to crush the opposition. In the meantime, he fired Thi's successor Nguyễn Văn Chuân because he wanted a firmer attempt to regain control, and appointed Tôn Thất Đính to replace him. Đính claimed to have calmed the situation, but Kỳ viewed the situation as appeasement, and on May 15, his forces drove off Đính and took over. During the previous month, American forces had also become involved in the stand-off, and the Struggle Movement viewed their participation as biased towards Kỳ, leading to some tense confrontations.

In the second half of May, Kỳ's forces began to force the issue and gradually wore down the Struggle Movement as the rebel I Corps forces were worn down, despite some American objections that his aggressive attacks had the potential to cause too much collateral damage. At one stage, Kỳ's forces ended up in a skirmish with American forces, and later, the Americans were in the middle of a stand-off between the Vietnamese factions regarding a mined bridge. As Kỳ's forces took back Da Nang and Huế in street fighting, Struggle Movement supporters saw American intervention as being pro-Kỳ, and anti-US riots resulted in some American buildings being burnt down. Kỳ's triumph ended the Buddhist movement's influence on politics and he confined their leader Thích Trí Quang to house arrest thereafter, while Thi left for the United States.

== Background ==
South Vietnam had a Buddhist majority, comprising 70% or more of the population. Vietnamese Buddhism had flourished under the early years of Diệm's First Republic. However, over time, Ngo Dinh Diem pursued pro-Catholic policies that antagonized many Buddhists. The government was biased towards Catholics in public service and military promotions, as well as the allocation of land and business favors. The "private" status that was imposed on Buddhism by the French, which required official permission to conduct public Buddhist activities, was not repealed by Diệm. According to contemporaneous reporting, white and gold Catholic flag was flown at major public events in South Vietnam.

The Buddhist flag

On May 8, 1963, Diệm's officials invoked a rarely enforced law to prohibit the display of religious flags, forbidding Buddhists from flying their flag on Vesak, the birthday of Gautama Buddha. This caused Buddhist indignation, as Catholic flags had been flown a week earlier at a celebration for Diệm's brother, Archbishop Ngô Đình Thục. On May 8, in Huế, a crowd of Buddhists protested against the ban on the Buddhist flag. The police and army opened fire and threw grenades at the demonstrators, leaving nine dead.

Diệm's denial of responsibility for the incident—he blamed it on the communist Viet Cong—led to more discontent among the Buddhist majority. The incident spurred a protest movement against the religious discrimination of Diệm's Roman Catholic-dominated regime. The dispute came to be known as the Buddhist crisis, and it provoked widespread and large-scale civil disobedience. The objective of the protests was to have Decree Number 10 repealed, and to gain religious equality. However, the standoff persisted, and in August, the ARVN Special Forces of Colonel Lê Quang Tung, loyal to Diệm's brother and chief adviser Ngô Đình Nhu, raided temples across the country, killing an estimated hundreds and arresting thousands of Buddhist laypeople and monks. After this, the American government began to turn against Diệm and secretly encouraged a coup. On November 1, Diệm was deposed and he and Nhu were assassinated the next day.

After Diệm, South Vietnam went through a period of persistent and serious instability, as multiple coups, as well as other failed uprisings, occurred for 18 months. Apart from personal rivalries between the senior officers, the infighting was also stoked by conflict between religious pressure movements. The Buddhists lobbied for the removal of Diệm's pro-Catholic policies, as well as those officers who had risen up the ranks quickly because they converted to Catholicism and vigorously enacted Diệm's policies. On the other hand, Catholics, whose privileges were rolled back post-Diệm, accused the regime of General Nguyễn Khánh of persecuting them on behalf of the Buddhists. At times, religious riots broke out during this period.

In September 1964, the Catholic Generals Lâm Văn Phát and Dương Văn Đức tried to overthrow Khanh after he had removed them under Buddhist pressure. This failed, but in February 1965, Phat tried again with the help of fellow Catholic, Colonel Phạm Ngọc Thảo, publicly invoking the memory of Diệm in launching their coup. Phát's second attempt also failed, and the pair went on the run, but the inability of Khánh to secure a decisive victory forced him into exile. In mid-1965, Air Marshal Nguyễn Cao Kỳ and General Nguyễn Văn Thiệu took charge as prime minister and figurehead president, respectively, and continuity began to arise.

Because of the fractious nature of Vietnamese politics in the period after Diệm's overthrow, no officer could rule decisively without regard for the opinions of his peers without being deposed. The generals who commanded South Vietnam's four corps oversaw separate geographical regions, and were given wide-ranging powers. In the absence of civilian government, they were virtual warlords in their regions. The corps commanders were happy with this federated arrangement; Kỳ was acceptable to the US, and he would pass American military aid to them while allowing them substantial regional autonomy.

Despite the steady control of Kỳ and Thiệu, the religious tension remained. After one month, Thích Trí Quang began to call for the removal of Thiệu because he was a member of Diệm's Catholic Cần Lao Party, decrying his "fascistic tendencies", and claiming that Cần Lao members were undermining Kỳ. For Thích Trí Quang, Thiệu was a symbol of the Diệm era of Catholic domination, when advancement was based on religion. He had desired that General Thi, known for his pro-Buddhist position would lead the country, and denounced Thiệu for his alleged past crimes against Buddhists. The Buddhist leader Thích Trí Quang said that "Thi is nominally a Buddhist, but does not really care about religion".

The Buddhist activists wanted to end the war through a negotiated settlement with the communists and the departure of the Americans, putting them at odds with the pro-war, pro-American generals. It was clear that the Buddhists would stage some kind of protest against Kỳ and Thiệu, and the prime minister regarded the Buddhist activists as traitors, so he welcomed confrontation as an opportunity to break their influence.

=== Rivalry between Kỳ and Thi ===
Within the circle of the South Vietnamese government, General Nguyễn Chánh Thi was a Buddhist and a competent commander regarded by Kỳ as a threat. Many political observers in Saigon thought that Thi wanted to depose Kỳ, and regarded him as the biggest threat to the other officers and the junta's stability. According to Kỳ's memoirs, Thi was a "born intriguer" who had "left-wing inclinations". Time magazine published a piece in February 1966 that claimed that Thi was more dynamic than Kỳ and could seize power at any time. The historian Robert Topmiller thought that Kỳ may have seen the article as destabilizing and therefore decided to move against Thi.

A native of central Vietnam, Thi was the commander of I Corps, which oversaw the five northernmost provinces of South Vietnam and the 1st and 2nd Divisions. He was known to have the "deep-rooted" loyalty of his soldiers. A large part of the South Vietnamese military was the Regional and Popular Forces, which were militia who served in their native areas, and they appreciated a commander with a regionalistic rapport. The support from the Buddhists, his troops and the regional tendencies gave Thi a strong power base and made it hard for the other generals and the Americans to move against him.

Thi was a senior member in the ten-man ruling junta, which opposed the Buddhist activists. Thi performed a balancing act, and accommodated the Buddhists, wanting them to see him as a friend. He allowed the students to publish a magazine that was highly critical of military rule. Thi also manoeuvred to have a trusted subordinate installed as the head of the national police, increasing his political power. The historian Stanley Karnow said of Kỳ and Thi: "Both flamboyant characters who wore gaudy uniforms and sported sinister moustaches, the two young officers had been friends, and their rivalry seemed to typify the personal struggles for power that chronically afflicted South Vietnam. But their dispute mirrored more than individual ambition." Both were also known for their colourful red berets.

There were reports that Thi was showing insubordination towards Kỳ. The US military commander in Vietnam, General William Westmoreland, said that Thi once refused to report to Kỳ in Saigon when requested. On one occasion, Kỳ came to I Corps to remonstrate with him in early March, Thi addressed his staff and asked mockingly "Should we pay attention to this funny little man from Saigon or should we ignore him?" Thi made this comment rather loudly, within earshot of Kỳ, and the Vietnamese politician Bùi Diễm thought that the prime minister viewed Thi's comment as a direct challenge to his authority. In Vietnam, newspapers critical of the government of the day were routinely shut down so that only mouthpieces were left speaking, and many political leaders erroneously assumed that the US operated in the same manner. As a result, they often interpreted negative US media reports as the official position of Washington and thus encouragement of a coup.

Time magazine said that Thi "ran it [I Corps] like a warlord of yore, obeying those edicts of the central government that suited him and blithely disregarding the rest". The historian George McTurnan Kahin said that Kỳ may have feared that Thi would secede from Saigon and turn central Vietnam into an independent state. The CIA analyst Douglas Pike, who worked in Vietnam, speculated that this would have been a large part of Kỳ's thinking, as Vietnamese people often had strong regional tendencies. In February 1966, Kỳ attended the Honolulu summit, where President Lyndon B. Johnson repeatedly praised him as a strong leader. Kỳ's ego was boosted by Johnson's praise, and he left Honolulu believing that the United States would support him if he dismissed Thi.

=== Dismissal of Thi ===
A combination of those factors resulted in Thi's dismissal. Kỳ mustered the support of eight of the generals on the 10-man junta, meaning that along with his vote, there were nine officers in favour of Thi's removal. With Thi the only non-supporter, Kỳ and his colleagues removed Thi from the junta and his corps command on March 10, 1966. Kỳ threatened to resign if the decision was not unanimous, claiming that the junta needed a show of strength, so Thi decided to vote for his sacking.

Thi claimed that during this meeting, knowing that the other generals were not favourable to him, he nettled them by chastising their commitment to the country. He said that the population would never support the generals' war effort as long as they lived so comfortably, and he mocked them for ostentatiously flying their female partners to Hong Kong for shopping expeditions. The junta put Thi under house arrest pending his departure from the country, and then appointed General Nguyễn Văn Chuân, the erstwhile commander of 1st Division and a Thi subordinate, as the new I Corps commander. General Phan Xuân Nhuận was then made the 1st Division commander.

At first, Kỳ said that Thi was leaving the country to receive medical treatment for his nasal passages. An official announcement said that the junta "had considered and accepted General Thi's application for a vacation". Thi retorted that "The only sinus condition I have is from the stink of corruption." Kỳ gave a series of reasons for dismissing Thi, accusing him of being too left-wing, of ruling the central regions like a warlord, of having a mistress who was suspected of being a communist, and being too conspiratorial. Kỳ did not say that Thi supported negotiations as a means of ending the war, but he did have a history of removing officials and military figures who promoted such a policy.

Despite Thi's good relations with the Buddhists in his area, most notably the leading activist monk Thích Trí Quang, Kỳ reportedly had the monk's support for Thi's removal. If Kỳ thought that Thích Trí Quang would not organize demonstrations against Thi's dismissal, he turned out to be wrong, as the monk used the crisis to highlight Buddhist calls for civilian rule. There were claims that Quang had always intended to challenge Kỳ, regardless of whether or not Thi had been cast aside.

General Westmoreland, US Ambassador Henry Cabot Lodge Jr., and the Defense Secretary Robert McNamara were supportive of the Kỳ-Thiệu regime and their prosecution of the war against the communists, and they opposed Thi, regarding him as not being firm enough against communism. The Americans wanted to ease Thi's out of the corridors of power in South Vietnam by offering him an economic future in the United States and an education for his children. On the other hand, Thi did have the support of Marine Lieutenant General Lewis W. Walt, who commanded American forces in I Corps and was the senior adviser to Thi's ARVN forces. Walt thought highly of Thi's abilities as an officer.

The dismissal caused widespread demonstrations in the northern provinces. Initially, the pro-Buddhist demonstrations in I Corps and Saigon were mild and orderly. However, the unrest steadily grew, as civil servants, disaffected military personnel, and the working under-class, in part upset with the economic problems, joined the anti-government demonstrations. At first, Kỳ tried to ignore the demonstrations and wait for them to peter out, and to do not fight the dissidents, so as "not to provide any martyrs". Thi was immensely popular in the Buddhist stronghold of Huế. A general strike had incapacitated 90% of Da Nang, the largest city in central Vietnam and the second biggest in the entire country. In Saigon, 10,000 attended a Buddhist rally to call for elections and civilian rule and the monks used Thi's dismissal to focus attention on the junta's rule.

Meanwhile, in the capital in mid-to-late March, Kỳ took the lead in trying to dampen discontent, meeting Buddhist leaders and promising elections and social reform; however, he also warned that street demonstrations would be suppressed. Showing the Americans' concern that the situation may deteriorate, Lodge met with Quang to warn him about taking aggressive actions. Although Quang accused Kỳ of "indulging in a cult of personality", most of the Buddhist banners focused their criticism against the Catholic figurehead chief of state Thiệu.

Kỳ then decided to allow Thi to return to Da Nang, the largest city in the region and the second largest in the country on March 16, ostensibly to restore order. Kỳ claimed that he allowed Thi to return to his old area of command as a goodwill gesture, to keep central Vietnamese happy, and because he promised Thi a farewell visit before going into exile. Given Thi's popularity, Kỳ's gesture was regarded as a political gamble. In any case, Thi made a tongue-in-cheek speech, filled with sarcastic references about his need to go to the US for healthcare.

The next day, Thi went to the former imperial capital of Huế in his corps. Around 20,000 supporters, in a town of around 130,000 mobbed him, shouting and trying to touch him. A Buddhist student leader cried "Do you want the general to stay with us?" to which the students and other protestors answered, "Yes! Yes!" Neil Sheehan of The New York Times said that the crowd display "left no doubt that the ruling Saigon junta was in trouble". Thi told the large crowd "Think about our country, not about me". He told a journalist that he would accept "any position which is useful for the country", leading some to think that he wanted Kỳ or Thiệu's job. According to Time magazine, Thi's speeches showed that he "was obviously torn between a desire to rally support for a comeback and his soldier's distaste for adding to dissension". Thi's speech was followed by presentations by student and Buddhist leaders, who called for the removal of Thiệu and Defense Minister Nguyễn Hữu Có. Both were Catholic generals notorious known for their rampant corruption. However, despite the large-scale demonstrations and support for Thi, there had been no clashes or strong tensions at the time. One prominent Buddhist leader said "We are very grateful to the generals...Kỳ brought about some stability in the last eight months" after he became the leader of South Vietnam.

The various dissidents formed a pro-Thi, anti-Kỳ organization called the Military-Civilian Struggle Committee, better known as the Struggle Movement. Their message and influence quickly spread. Some of them took over the government radio station in Da Nang and made anti-junta broadcasts, and they were joined by university students. Initially this dissident soapboxing was not treated with much alarm and it was thought that the regime had decided to wait for the protests to peter out instead of risking an escalation by trying to suppress it. The administrator at Da Nang's radio station allowed the Thi supporters to make a broadcaster when only ten student protesters turned up, a minuscule amount of popular pressure. The opposition groups were not well organized at this time and seemed unsure of their objectives. They were also conducting themselves placidly at this point.

The challenge to Saigon increased when the Struggle Movement claimed authority over the military forces in Quảng Nam Province, which included Da Nang and the military bases there. Buddhists in Huế joined in and took control of the radio station and joined the Struggle Movement. Four hundred students took control of the radio station for two days, disseminating speeches criticizing Kỳ's junta. Despite assailing the Americans for their support of the junta, ironically during breaks in the speeches, John Philip Sousa's "The Stars and Stripes Forever" was played.

By the end of March the situation had worsened. The movement became anti-American as well as anti-Saigon government, and it increased in influence until most of I Corps was operating independently of central Vietnamese government control. Washington became alarmed and Kỳ decided to act. The Mayor of Da Nang then started openly supporting the rebelling ARVN soldiers of the I Corps who refused to obey Kỳ.

Kỳ then sacked the police chief of Huế, a Thi loyalist. The local policemen responded by going on strike and demonstrating against their chief's removal. On the weekend, 20,000 civilians along with some military personnel in uniform in the imperial capital. They carried banners proclaiming "Down with [Chief of State] Thiệu and Kỳ". The Struggle Movement called a two-day general strike, which was taken up by public servants. This cut down traffic and hindered stevedoring operations at Da Nang Port. The large turnout was in part attributed to economic discontent over rapid inflation rates rather than strictly religious or democracy desires. Kỳ responded to this on nationwide by warning that the junta would "move strongly" to quell agitation. However, he moderated his words by promising a new constitution by no later than November and that the national elections might be held at the end of the year, bringing it one year forward.

However, the supporters of Quang appeared unwilling to wait for Kỳ's schedule, calling for the Constituent Assembly that would draft the new constitution to be chosen from provincial and city councils, where Buddhists did well in elections, but Kỳ refused. While Quang seemed unlikely to see eye-to-eye with Kỳ, the Saigon-based Buddhist leader Thich Tam Chau appeared open to an accommodation with Kỳ.

== Military threats by Kỳ and ongoing unrest ==
On April 1, Kỳ despatched General Pham Xuan Chieu to I Corps in an attempt to get Thi to rally to the Saigon junta. However, when Chieu entered Huế, he was ambushed by a group of anti-Kỳ students, who captured him and transported him around the city in a cyclo before releasing him.

On the public holiday that commemorates Emperor Hung Vuong, the legendary founder of Vietnam, Saigon's Buddhists used a trick to stage protests against Kỳ and Thiệu's junta. They asked for a permit for a public gathering to celebrate the occasion at the market, and were granted approval on the grounds that at most 600 people took part and that no anti-government sentiment was expressed. However, a few thousand people turned up to the event and then erected pictures of Kỳ and the senior junta generals on the posts used for public executions, adding a poster that read: "This is the plaza of demagogy. Kỳ, Thiệu and Co. must be executed." The civilian protestors then used megaphones to transform the event into an anti-junta, anti-American, anti-war demonstration through the capital, complete with pre-prepared banners.

Kỳ also recalled the police chief of Huế, a Thi ally, to Saigon, prompting his men to protest. On the weekend, some 20,000 people, mostly civilians but also including some uniformed troops, staged a demonstration, carrying large banners reading "Down with Thiệu and Kỳ". Another two-day general strike was called for public servants with much success in Huế.

On April 3, Kỳ held a press conference during which he claimed that Da Nang was under communist control and vowed to stage a military operation to regain the territory. He thus implied that the Buddhists were communist agents. He then vowed to kill the mayor of Da Nang, saying "Either Da Nang's mayor is shot or the government will fall." The following evening, Kỳ deployed three battalions of marines to Da Nang using American military transport aircraft. The marines stayed at Da Nang Air Base and made no moves against the rebels in the city. Soon after, they were joined by two battalions of Vietnamese Rangers, as well as some riot police and paratroopers.

On April 5, Ky flew into Da Nang to take command of the operation in an attempt to intimidate the dissident forces into submission. However, his presence provoked further local opposition among both the military and civilian elements in the city. General Chuan deployed his forces to block all the routes leaving Da Nang Air Base, and informed Ky that his forces would not be deployed outside the base, and that there would be violence if they attempted to do so. Chuan said that political issues could not be solved by military action. General Nhuan of the 1st Division in Hue then came out in support of the Struggle Movement and vowed to fight Ky's loyalists if they came to the former imperial capital. Ky was then forced into an embarrassing announcement that he was withdrawing his forces to Saigon and apologised to the people of Da Nang for accusing them or being communists.

Meanwhile, civil unrest continued in the cities of South Vietnam. Around 5,000 turned out in Huế to demonstrate, while another 10,000 took to the streets of Da Nang. A mob of 10,000 looted government buildings in the south central coast town of Qui Nhơn, while some 2,000 soldiers as well as some senior officers demonstrated.

The protests were at their most violent in the capital Saigon, where pro-Buddhist students rioted, using bicycle chains and sticks as weapons, vandalised cars, threw rocks and shouted anti-American slogans. Street battles erupted between Kỳ's loyalist police and troops, as the dissidents fought tear gas with rocks, homemade spears, glass bottles and sometimes a hand grenade. The police frequently lost the ascendancy to the rioters, who dispersed them and forced them to flee. At one stage, the military mayor of Saigon went onto the streets in attempt to try to convince the rioters to stop, but he was pelted with projectiles as well. Often the protesters wore makeshift masks made of plastic bags and threw tear gas canisters back at the police and military, and regardless of who was on the receiving end, this often necessitated momentary retreats due to eye irritation. Some 300 Buddhists staged a sit-down protest at the national radio station in capital before the police used clubs to disperse them. The riots were repeated in the Central Highlands towns of Da Lat, Pleiku and Ban Me Thuot.

Kỳ took personal command and found that the roads leading into the city as being blocked by Buddhist civilians and pro-Thi portions of I Corps. After a stand-off, Kỳ realized that he could not score a decisive victory and had lost face. He arranged a meeting and media event with Chuan, and various Struggle Movement supporters.

During the unrest of early April, the Buddhists called for a constitution, for the junta to hand power to an elected civilian executive and legislature, which Kỳ had repeatedly promised to honour in the future. The Buddhists wanted the Constituent Assembly, which would draft the constitution, to be chosen from regional and city councils, which were dominated by Buddhists, something that Kỳ objected to. Having miscalculated in his deployment of marines and paratroopers to Da Nang for a show of force, the humiliated Kỳ arrived back in Saigon, where he met with Buddhist leaders for negotiations. The Buddhists demanded an amnesty for rioters and mutinous soldiers, and for Kỳ to withdraw the marines from Da Nang back to Saigon where they formed part of the strategic reserve. The monks said they would order the Struggle Movement "temporarily suspend all forms of struggle to prove our good will". Chau took a moderate line on the matter of the constitution, however, Quang refused and the protests continued.

Walt was caught between the two Vietnamese military factions. On April 9 the tension escalated. Pro-Struggle Movement ARVN Colonel Dam Quang Yeu ordered a convoy of infantry, tanks and artillery to proceed north from Hội An to Da Nang. The Americans finally waded into the dispute when Major General Wood B. Kyle, the commanding officer of the 3rd Marine Division, ordered the 9th Marine Regiment to block Route 1 and stop the convoy. A platoon from the 2nd Battalion 9th Marines, supported by two antitank vehicles, blocked a truck on the bridge outside the city and took up positions on the northern bank. A group of VNAF fighter planes flew overhead the rebel convoy, threatening to bomb them. Colonel Yeu responded by aiming 155mm howitzers at the Da Nang Air Base where Kỳ's forces were located.

Walt dispatched Colonel John Chaisson to the standoff at the bridge. Chaisson warned Yeu not to raise the stakes any higher. To add weight to his arguments, a group of F-8E attack aircraft flew over the bridge with rockets and bombs. Walt further told his marines to aim 155mm and 8-inch guns at the rebel position.

Yeu told Chaisson that he was a friend of the marines but that "he had come to fight the Saigon government troops who threatened the local people. He had come to lay down his own life if necessary." Yeu's men unpacked and fused their artillery shells. Chaisson warned Yeu that his rebels would be destroyed if they fired on his men, then returned to his helicopter and departed. Tensions eased over the next week. The Vietnamese marines returned to the capital and the I Corps forces resumed fighting against the communists. Thi publicly disassociated himself from the Buddhists. However, he remained in I Corps and was still regarded as a significant political influence. Kỳ later claimed to be unconcerned by the apparent challenge to his authority by protestors and the military in I Corps, claiming that they represent a small fraction of Vietnamese society.

While the Johnson administration maintained a low-key approach during this period of stalemate and tension, many American commentators and cartoonists blamed Johnson for situation, saying that his overt enthusiasm and support of Kỳ had made the South Vietnamese people view him as an American puppet. There Americans were publicly pretending to be uninvolved in the Vietnamese dispute, Secretary of State Dean Rusk saying "This is in part an effort by some civilian groups to carve out a certain position in relation to the steps that have been announced for some time by the military government to move toward a constitutional system." Johnson was greatly dismayed by the fact that America's allies in South Vietnam were fighting each other, all the more so as the possibility that troops loyal to Thi might use their American-supplied weapons against American troops would lead to domestic criticism of his administration. Johnson complained that Kỳ's remark to the press that he have the mayor of Danang shot for supporting Thi showed "bad judgement" and wanted to know if there was any other examples of Kỳ's "bad judgement". General Maxwell Taylor told Johnson that while he was serving as ambassador to South Vietnam in 1964 that Kỳ had expressed "tremendous admiration" for Adolf Hitler "but I thought he had matured" since then.

The Struggle Movement commanded wide support in South Vietnam, with a demonstration in Saigon being attended by thousands of people, including many Catholic leaders and by soldiers of the ARVN 1st Division. Lodge wrote in a dispatch to Washington that the "bulk of the population" in South Vietnam supported the Struggle Movement, and if the free elections which the Struggle Movement were demanding were held, then the candidates endorsed by the Struggle Movement would win overwhelmingly. The Struggle Movement was an anti-communist mass movement, stressing its opposition to a communist government (not the least because of the persecution of Buddhists in China, North Korea and North Vietnam), but at the same time, the Struggle Movement's demand that South Vietnam be neutral in the Cold War was considered unacceptable by the Americans, who were only willing to accept a government in Saigon allied to the United States. The American historian Marilyn B. Young wrote that it was a sign of the groupthink that prevailed in the Johnson administration that Lodge's claim that a democratic, but neutral South Vietnam would be a disaster for the U.S. went unquestioned. The Struggle Movement preached a mixture of Buddhism, pacifism, Vietnamese nationalism and neutralism with people at its rallies car

rying signs saying "Stop killing our people" and "Foreign Countries Have No Right To Set Up Military Bases On Vietnamese Land". Reflecting anger at the United States for backing Kỳ, the Struggle Movement held a demonstration outside of the U.S. embassy in Saigon with people chanting "Da Dao My!" ("Down with the Americans!").

Kỳ's claims were that the Struggle Movement was just a Viet Cong front organization and the Buddhist clergymen leading the Movement were puppets of the Communists were endorsed by both Lodge and Westmoreland. Johnson's National Security Adviser, Walt Whitman Rostow gave Johnson an analogy from Russian history, stating the Struggle Movement were the Vietnamese equivalents of Right Socialist Revolutionary Alexander Kerensky while the Viet Cong were the equivalent of Vladimir Lenin's Bolsheviks; Rostow argued that just as Kerensky was unable to prevent the overthrow of the Provisional Government in 1917 by the Bolsheviks, so too would the Struggle Movement being unable to stop the Viet Cong from overthrowing them if they should come to power. Thus, Rostow concluded that the United States had to support the rightist Kỳ's efforts to crush the Struggle Movement as it was the only way of preventing the Communists from coming to power, despite the reports that Kỳ was extremely unpopular with the South Vietnamese people. As Rostow was Johnson's favorite foreign policy adviser, his advice to support Kỳ was decisive.

== Đính takes command of I Corps ==
When General Chuan, the I Corps Commander, asked for the marines to be withdrawn from Da Nang, the others on the ten-man junta unanimously removed him; he also voted for his own ouster. Kỳ replaced him with General Tôn Thất Đính. Kỳ felt that General Tôn Thất Đính's aggressive attitude following the Xá Lợi Pagoda raids staged under the Diệm regime in 1963 indicated a willingness to suppress Buddhist dissidents. Đính arrived in Huế on April 15.

The Buddhists reacted to Đính's appointment with dismay. They openly took responsibility for organising all future demonstrations, releasing a proclamation to that effect through the Vien Hoa Dao. They declared the country to be in "a state of emergency" and demanded civilian rule immediately, calling for an escalation in protests.

After a week, Đính announced that he had restored Saigon's authority over the region. He proclaimed that he had regained control of the radio stations in Da Nang and Huế from the dissidents and that he had convinced the mayor of Da Nang to stay loyal to Saigon. Đính announced a deal whereby the Buddhists would have regular air time in return for relinquishing control of the radio station. This move was interpreted in different ways. Some felt that Đính was attempting to gain favour with the Buddhists in anticipation of Kỳ's fall from power, while Frances FitzGerald felt it was the only sensible government action during the crisis. On April 19, clashes erupted in Quảng Ngãi between the Buddhists and the Việt Nam Quốc Dân Đảng (VNQDĐ, Vietnamese Nationalist Party), who supported the continuation of the anti-communist war, prompting Đính to forcibly restrain the two groups.

However, the easing tensions did not last. Kỳ was still looking to make a show of force. Without telling the figurehead President Thiệu or Westmoreland, Kỳ ordered General Cao Văn Viên to lead a force into Da Nang. On May 15, government Vietnamese marines and airborne units were airlifted from the capital to Da Nang. Landing at dawn, they proceeded into the city centre and captured the local ARVN headquarters.

Washington called Walt to ask for an update on the situation. According to Kỳ, the American general was "furious at an assault without warning on what he regarded as his territory." Kỳ ordered a plane to fly over the positions of the pro-Buddhist forces and drop messages threatening to liquidate them if they shot at his men. At the time the Viet Cong were quiet and did not take advantage of the situation.

The surprised Đính abandoned his post and fled to Walt's headquarters. Đính asked Walt for help and was flown to Huế, where the pro-Thi and pro-Buddhist elements were still in control. Kỳ's surprise attack led to conflict between the ARVN rebels and loyalists, with the American ground forces caught in the middle, effectively creating a civil war within a civil war. Kỳ eventually quelled the rebellion and briefly jailed Đính.

== Military climax ==
Later on the morning of May 15, two VNAF aircraft loyal to Kỳ strafed rebel ARVN units located near US Marine positions to the north of Da Nang. Wanting to avoid bloodshed, Walt asked Kỳ's junta to withdraw his loyalist forces from the city.

On May 16, Kỳ rejected Walt's request and formally replaced Đính as I Corps commander with General Huỳnh Văn Cao, another Catholic and Diệm loyalist. The next day, Cao, accompanied by Colonel Archelaus L. Hamblen, the senior U.S. Army advisor in I Corps, and Brigadier general Jonas M. Platt, Chief of Staff to III MAF, flew to Huế to visit the headquarters of ARVN 1st Division. A hostile pro-Buddhist crowd rioted and broke into the division's command post as Cao prepared to depart south for Da Nang. As the American helicopter lifted off, a pro-Buddhist ARVN lieutenant hit it with two pistol shots. In response, the US Army door gunner fired a burst that killed the lieutenant and wounded two adjacent soldiers. Struggle Movement supporters railed against the Americans for what they regarded as inappropriate interference in internal South Vietnamese dispute.

Still unwilling to remove his forces and seek a peaceful solution, Kỳ relished the opportunity for a confrontation with the American military. According to his memoirs, Kỳ told his loyalist officers in Da Nang to train their heaviest artillery at the American Marine base. If the Americans took action to hinder the aggressive pro-Kỳ aircraft, the commanders should "destroy the Marine base. That is an order." Kỳ then claimed that he flew to the city to reprimand Walt for improperly interfering in a domestic matter.

During the sporadic fighting that followed, Kỳ's marines gradually pushed the rebel soldiers towards the east of the Tourane River. By that time, the government soldiers had already retaken the Da Nang City Hall and radio station. The rebel soldiers then seized a bridge across the Tourane River, heavily used by the US military, they mined the bridge and the ammunition dump—which contained 6,000 tons— to prevent government soldiers from crossing to the other side.

On May 18, the government soldiers were preparing to cross the bridge and rebel gunners opened fire on them. The rebels then warned the government forces of the charges. In an effort to prevent the destruction of the bridge, Walt attempted to ease the hostilities between the two sides by sending Chaisson back to the scene. Chaisson talked Kỳ's marines into pulling back, and relieved them with a company of his marines on the western banks of the bridge. He then asked permission from rebel officer to place his marines on the other side of the bridge, but was rejected. Chaisson ignored the rebel officer and ordered his men to deploy to the Struggle Movement positions anyway. The Americans simply sat down on the road among the rebels without using any force. Walt then arrived and he and Chaisson walked across the bridge. They never reached the other side, as a rebel warrant officer ordered them to halt, threatening to explode the bridge. In the meantime, the rebels fired machine guns low at the Americans, briefly forcing them to duck. Walt began debating with the warrant officer who mined the bridge but it was fruitless; the Vietnamese rebel told him "General, we will die together" and brought his hand down. Another rebel officer, a military engineer, plunged the detonator. Walt recalled that "There was no doubt he expected the bridge to blow on his signal". However, the Americans had sent military engineers to defuse the explosives on the bridge and at the munitions dump, ending the standoff.

The Struggle Movement still controlled held several key strategic positions in Da Nang. Sporadic machine gun fire was exchanged between the two Vietnamese factions. On May 21, Walt heard that Kỳ had decided to use airstrikes against the rebels, and feared that the ordnance would cause civilian casualties; at the time, there were more than 1,000 American civilians in the city. Walt told Cao of his concerns. However, Cao was afraid of his own men killing him, and fled to Walt's headquarters seeking protection from Kỳ's airstrikes. Walt went to talk to the VNAF commander at Da Nang Air Base, but could not dissuade him. Instead, VNAF planes took off from the base loaded with rockets and bombs. As a result, Walt ordered the 1st Marine Aircraft Wing to arm four jet fighters in preparation for air-to-air combat. Rebel machine gunners located near US positions opened fire on loyalist troops, prompting two VNAF planes to fire rockets, but they were missed and instead three projectiles instead hit American positions, wounding eight marines. Walt ordered two American jets into the air and tail Kỳ's pilots and shoot them if they fired onto Da Nang. The VNAF responded by sending more planes into the air to trail the Americans and responded with a counterthreat, to which Walt reacted by sending more planes into the air. After two hours, the Vietnamese planes returned to the ground. Washington received a complaint from Saigon over Walt's interference, but after the general explained his position, he was given permission to act as he saw fit.

Thi met with Westmoreland on May 24, and with Kỳ three days later at Chu Lai, after the Americans had organised a meeting in an attempt to get Thi to support Kỳ or end his opposition, hoping that it would end the unrest without Kỳ having to attack Huế. The meeting resulted in the deposed general agreeing to leave the region for the good of the country. Before his departure for exile, Thi tried to convince Cao to return corps command. Cao, refused, fearing for his family's safety, and asked Westmoreland for asylum in America, saying that he wanted "to become an American citizen, to join the Marines or Army, to fight against the Communists" after returning to Vietnam.

Kỳ's junta then appointed General Hoàng Xuân Lãm to replace Cao. The new corps commanders then focused on fighting the communists instead of other ARVN units and the Americans.

== Victory for Kỳ ==
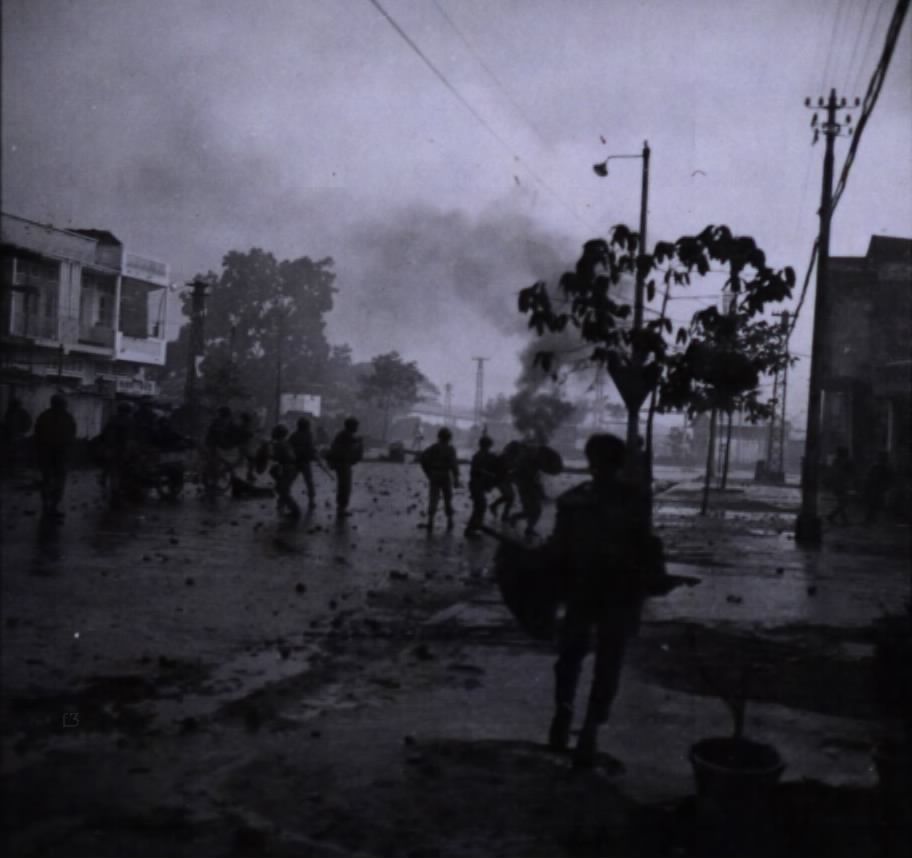
Riot police break up Buddhist demonstration, Saigon, 22 May 1966

By the end of May, the marines under Kỳ's command finally broke the remaining pockets of rebel soldiers and Buddhist militants in Da Nang, the Buddhist fighters managed to hold out for four hours against government ground assaults at Tan Ninh Pagoda.

On May 26, a large pro-Buddhist crowd attended the funeral of the rebel ARVN lieutenant who was killed after shooting at General Cao's departing helicopter. Afterward, the protestors rioted and burned down the US Information Service Library. Over the next week, three Buddhist clergy self-immolated in protest at US policies. The Buddhist activist leader Thích Trí Quang, went on a hunger strike, denouncing American support for the Kỳ-Thiệu junta, which he viewed as inappropriate interference in domestic affairs. The ARVN 1st Division sent guards to protect the US Consulate in Huế, but they fled when an anti-Kỳ mob rioted and overran the mission, setting it ablaze. With the assistance of the Americans, Kỳ sent Vietnamese marine and airborne battalions to Phu Bai Combat Base south of Huế. By June 19, the old imperial capital was under government control. Lodge publicly praised Kỳ regime for suppressing the Struggle Movement, calling it "a solid political victory".

In mid June, the Saigon-based Buddhist leader Thích Tâm Châu, regarded as being more moderate than Quang, called for passive resistance instead of rioting, and denounced any peace talks with the communists as a "surrender". However, he then called for the resignations of Kỳ and Thiệu within 48 hours, threatening that all Buddhist monks would otherwise nominate for "voluntary imprisonment". Quang responded to the situation by calling on Buddhists in Huế to place their altars onto the street to block the junta's troops. Thousands complied, and the police did not stop them. For two days, the altars stopped all road traffic and prevented convoys from travelling north of the city for a military buildup. He later relented and allowed a few hours a day for such traffic. He then penned a letter accusing the US of "imperialism" and went on a hunger strike. Kỳ ignored the Buddhist protests and sent 400 combat police to secure the city. They entered unopposed, arrested dissident policemen and removed the altars. Quang was arrested and taken to a local military hospital. He was later taken to Saigon and permanently put under house arrest.

Around 150 Vietnamese from both factions were killed in the uprising; another 700 were wounded. The Americans suffered 23 wounded, 18 of them marines. The collapse of the Buddhist Uprising effectively ended the Buddhists as a political force.

== Sources ==
- Buttinger, Joseph (1967). Vietnam: A Dragon Embattled. New York City: Praeger Publishers.
- Fall, Bernard B. (1963). The Two Viet-Nams. London: Praeger Publishers.
- Gettleman, Marvin E. (1966). Vietnam: History, documents and opinions on a major world crisis. Harmondsworth, Middlesex: Penguin Books.
- Hammer, Ellen J. (1987). A Death in November: America in Vietnam, 1963. New York City: E. P. Dutton. ISBN 0-525-24210-4.
- Jacobs, Seth (2006). Cold War Mandarin: Ngo Dinh Diem and the Origins of America's War in Vietnam, 1950–1963. Lanham, Maryland: Rowman & Littlefield. ISBN 0-7425-4447-8.
- Jones, Howard (2003). Death of a Generation: how the assassinations of Diem and JFK prolonged the Vietnam War. New York City: Oxford University Press. ISBN 0-19-505286-2.
- Kahin, George McT. (1986). Intervention : how America became involved in Vietnam. New York City: Knopf. ISBN 0-394-54367-X.
- Karnow, Stanley (1997). Vietnam: A history. New York City: Penguin Books. ISBN 0-670-84218-4.
- Langguth, A. J. (2000). Our Vietnam: the war, 1954–1975. New York City: Simon & Schuster. ISBN 0-684-81202-9.
- McAllister, James (2008). "'Only Religions Count in Vietnam': Thich Tri Quang and the Vietnam War". Modern Asian Studies. 42 (4). New York: Cambridge University Press: 751–782. doi:10.1017/s0026749x07002855. S2CID 145595067.
- Maclear, Michael (1981). Vietnam:The Ten Thousand Day War. New York City: Methuen Publishing. ISBN 0-423-00580-4.
- Moyar, Mark (2004). "Political Monks: The Militant Buddhist Movement during the Vietnam War". Modern Asian Studies. 38 (4). New York City: Cambridge University Press: 749–784. doi:10.1017/S0026749X04001295. S2CID 145723264.
- Moyar, Mark (2006). Triumph Forsaken: The Vietnam War, 1954–1965. New York City: Cambridge University Press. ISBN 0-521-86911-0.
- Topmiller, Robert J. (2006). The Lotus Unleashed: The Buddhist Peace Movement in South Vietnam, 1964–1966. Lexington, Kentucky: University Press of Kentucky. ISBN 0-8131-9166-1.
- Tucker, Spencer C. (2000). Encyclopedia of the Vietnam War: A Political, Social and Military History. Santa Barbara, California: ABC-CLIO. ISBN 1-57607-040-9.
- Warner, Denis (1963). The Last Confucian. New York City: Macmillan.
- Young, Marilyn (1990). The Vietnam Wars. New York, New York: Harper. ISBN 0060921072.
- Wiest, Andrew A. (2008). Vietnam's forgotten army: heroism and betrayal in the ARVN. New York City: New York University Press. ISBN 978-0-8147-9410-4.
