= Đặng Tuyết Mai =

Second Lady of South Vietnam from 1967 to 1971

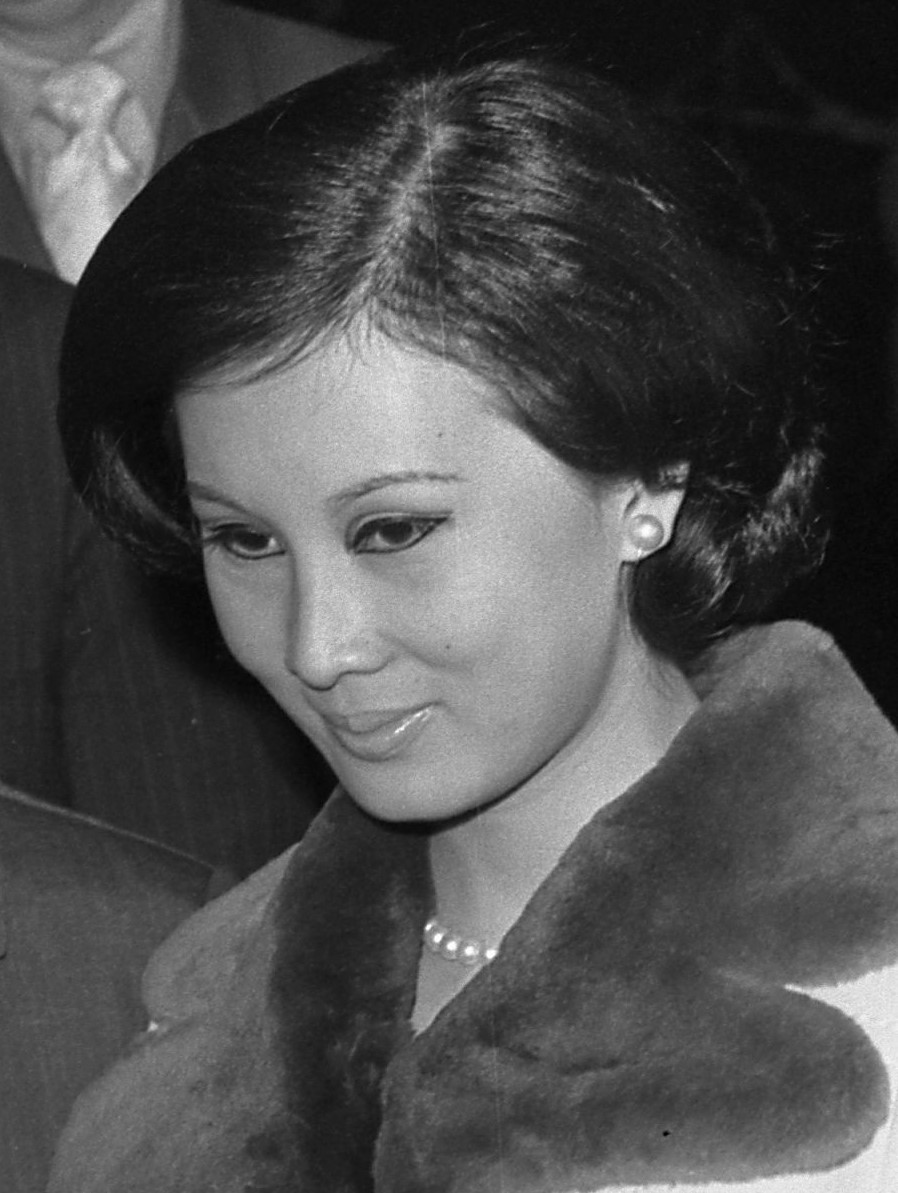
- Tuyết Mai in 1970

Second Lady of South Vietnam
- In role 31 October 1967 – 29 October 1971
- Vice President: Nguyễn Cao Kỳ
- Preceded by: Position established
- Succeeded by: Lưu Thị Triệu

Personal details
- Born: 4 October 1941 Hanoi, Tonkin, French Indochina
- Died: 21 December 2016 (aged 75) Newport Beach, California
- Resting place: Westminster Memorial Park and Mortuary, California, U.S.
- Spouses: Nguyễn Cao Kỳ (m. 1964; div. 1989); Bùi Xuân Hiến (m. 1989)
- Children: Nguyễn Cao Kỳ Duyên (daughter)
- Education: Lycée Yersin

Đặng Tuyết Mai, also known as Madame Nguyễn Cao Kỳ (4 October 1941 – 21 December 2016) was wife of Nguyễn Cao Kỳ, former Republic of Vietnam Air Force commander and politician, who served as Prime Minister of South Vietnam from 1965 to 1967, and then as Vice President until he retired from politics in 1971.

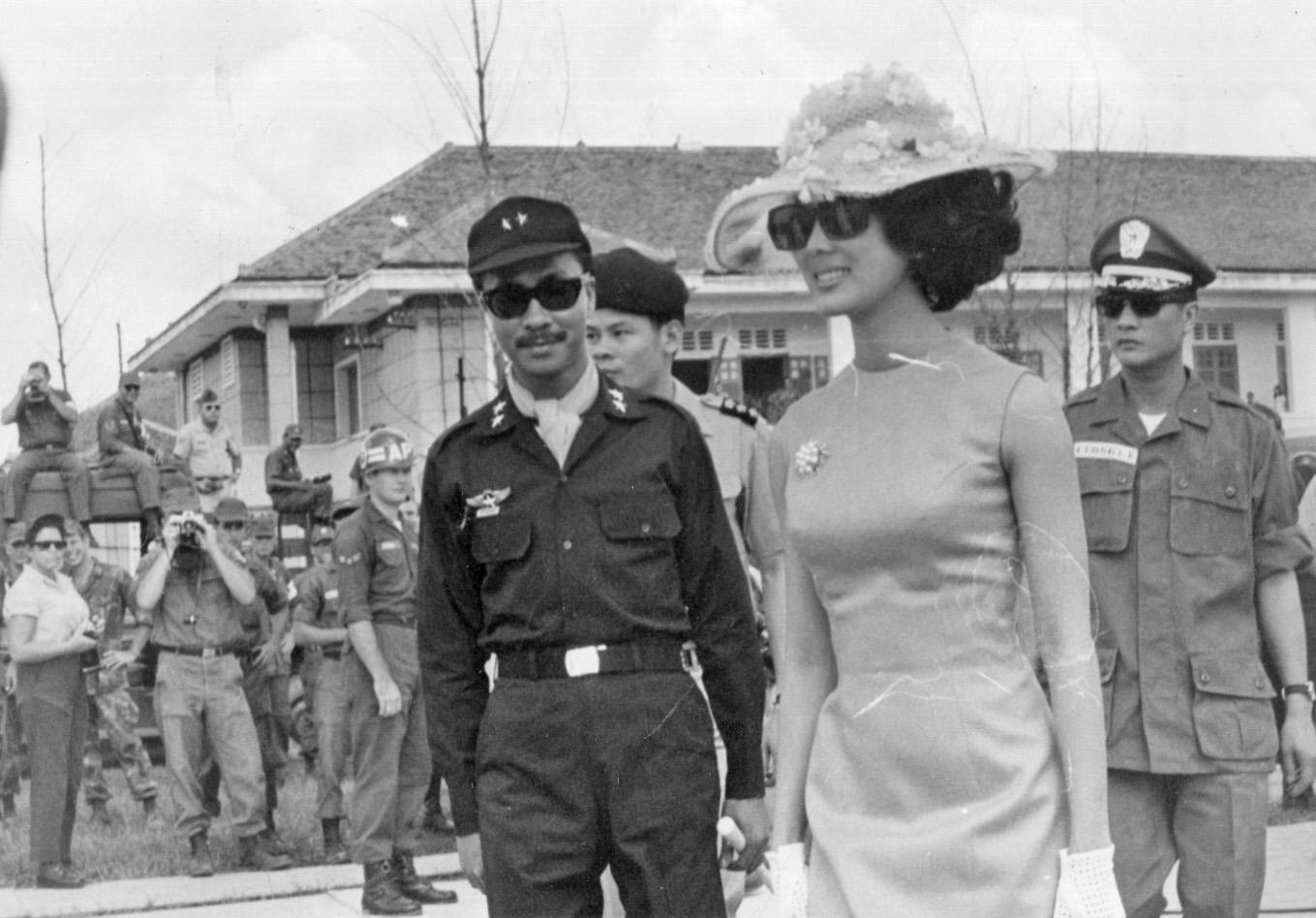
General Nguyen Cao Ky and his wife Madame Ky, circa 1966

== Life ==
Đặng Tuyết Mai was born in Hanoi, French Indochina in a noble family from Bắc Ninh province.

=== Second Lady of South Vietnam (1967–1971) ===
Some sources have referred to Madame Đặng Tuyết Mai as the former First Lady of South Vietnam while others as the former second lady since her ex-husband's highest position in the former South Vietnam was vice president and not president (the prime minister's position was head of government but not head of state). She was an Air Vietnam stewardess before she married General Ky, then the Chief of Staff of the Republic of Vietnam Air Force.

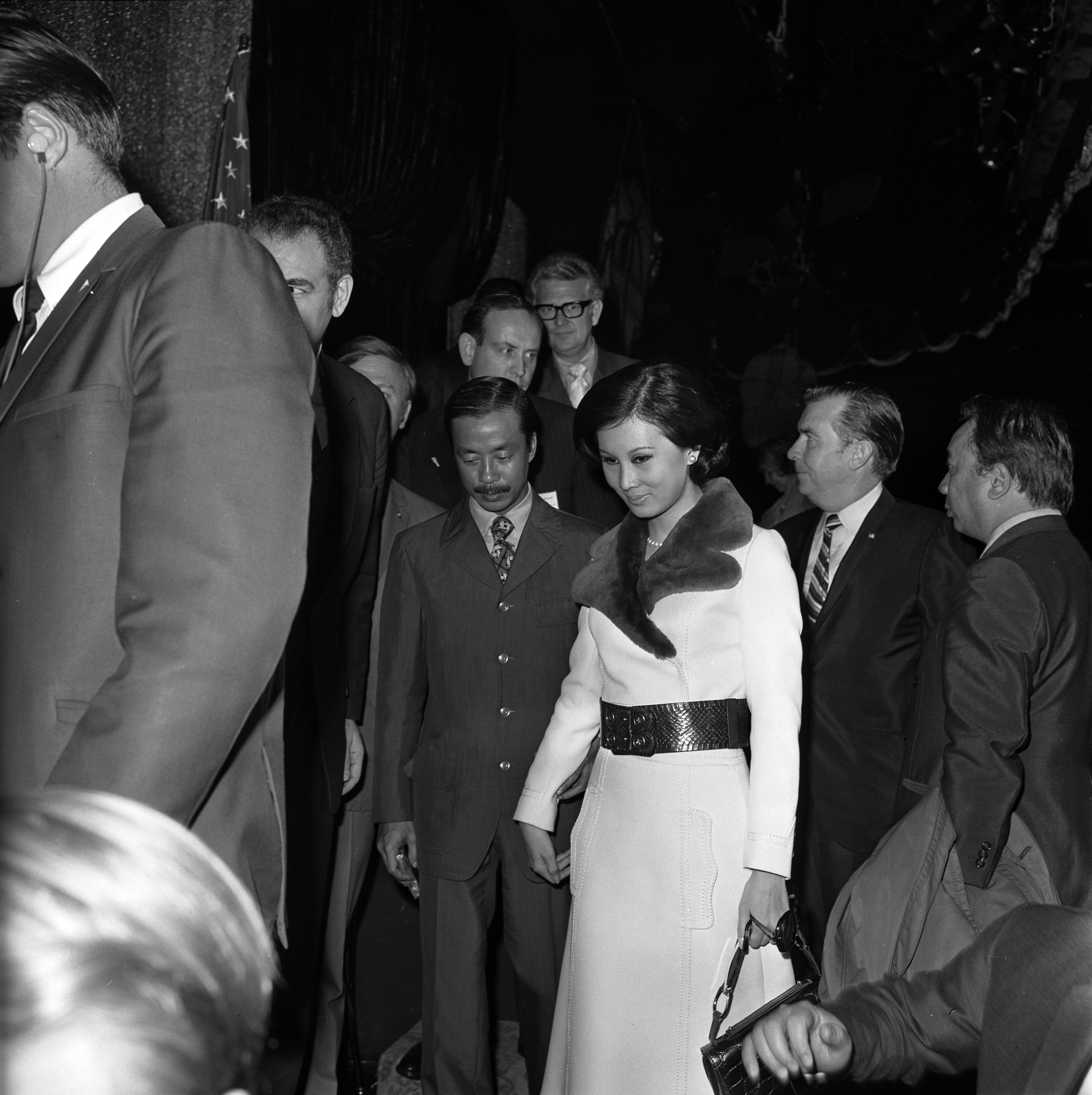
Vice President Nguyen Cao Ky and Madame Ky leaving the Ambassador Hotel, Los Angeles, 1970

While her husband served as prime minister and vice president, she travelled around South Vietnam and wore a military flight suit to show solidarity with the armed forces. In December 1966, she traveled to Tokyo's Jujin Hospital of Cosmetic Surgery for surgery under the name of Miss Dang Tuyet Mai of South Vietnam, which was reported by Time magazine.

Her daughter, Kỳ Duyên, is a well-known personality in the overseas Vietnamese entertainment industry, usually in the role of MC for musical programs.

== Exile and later life ==
During the Fall of Saigon, her husband had made arrangements for her and their children to be evacuated, while he fled by helicopter during Operation Frequent Wind, landing aboard the USS Blue Ridge. Reunited, they went into exile in the United States, settling in California. She participated in some overseas art programs such as Asia Center and from ASIA 40 to ASIA 49, as a presenter. She later divorced Ky and moved back to Vietnam, where she managed the restaurant Phở Ta, which was located at District 3, Ho Chi Minh City.

On 21 December 2016, she died at 5:00 a.m. at Hoag Hospital, Newport Beach, California. She was 75 years old. She is buried at the Westminster Memorial Park in Westminster, California.

Honorary titles
Preceded by Position established	Second Lady of South Vietnam; 1967–1971	Succeeded by Lưu Thị Triệu
