= Battle of Saigon (1968) =

Tet Offensive battle of the Vietnam War

Coordinates: 10.7669°N 106.6669°E

First Battle of Saigon
- Part of the Tet Offensive of the Vietnam War
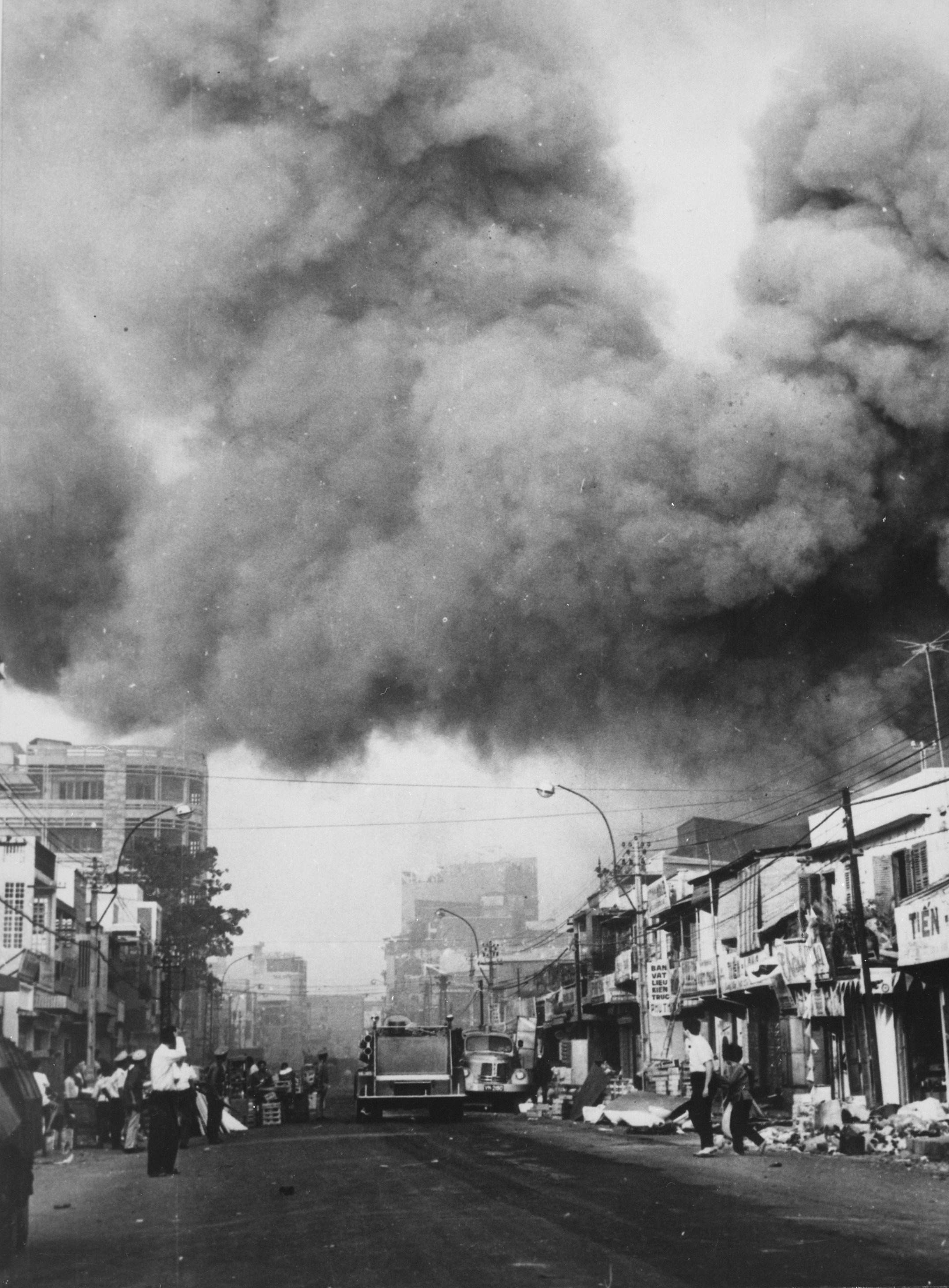
- Black smoke covers areas of the capital city and fire trucks rush to the scenes of fires set during attacks by the Viet Cong during the festive Tet holiday period. Saigon, 1968.
Date	January 30 – March 7, 1968
Location	Saigon, South Vietnam
Result	South Vietnamese-American victory: Communist attack repelled; North Vietnamese political and propaganda success; Increased anti-war sentiment in the United States

Belligerents
South Vietnam; United States; Australia	Viet Cong; North Vietnam

Commanders and leaders
Nguyễn Văn Thiệu (United States) William Westmoreland (United States) Robert McNamara	Trần Độ; Trần Văn Trà

Casualties and losses
Unknown	1,100 killed

The First Battle of Saigon, fought during the Tet Offensive of the Vietnam War, was the coordinated attack by communist forces, including both the North Vietnamese Army and the Viet Cong (VC), against Saigon, the capital of South Vietnam.

== Background ==
In late January 1968 the VC launched the Tet Offensive attacking U.S. and South Vietnamese positions across South Vietnam.

Saigon was the main focal point of the offensive, but a total takeover of the capital was not intended or feasible. They rather had six main targets in the city which 35 battalions of VC were to attack and capture: the ARVN Joint General Staff compound near Tan Son Nhat International Airport, the Independence Palace, the U.S. embassy, Tan Son Nhut Air Base, the Long Binh Naval Headquarters and the National Radio Station. Because it was Tết (the Vietnamese New Year), the sound of firecrackers exploding masked that of gunfire, giving an element of surprise to the Vietcong attacks.

== Battle ==
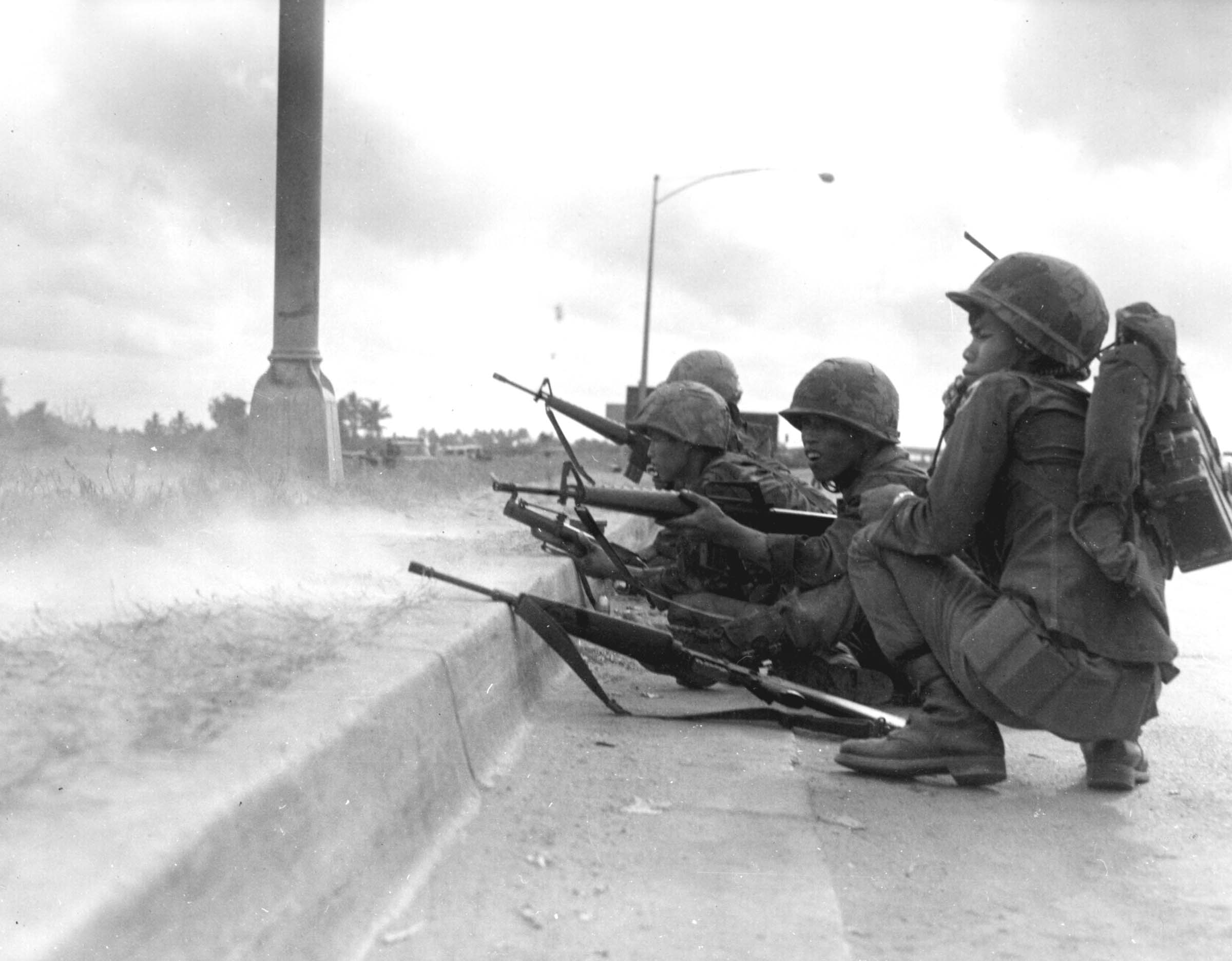
ARVN Rangers defending Saigon

The Vietcong launched 35 battalions at Saigon. Sapper Battalions and the local forces attacked the Presidential Palace, the National Radio Station, the U.S. Embassy, and other principal targets.

The VC 5th Division launched an attack on the military bases at Long Binh and Biên Hòa Air Base. The North Vietnamese 7th Division launched an attack on the U.S. 1st Infantry Division and the ARVN 5th Division at Lai Khê. The VC 9th Division attacked the U.S. 25th Infantry Division base at Củ Chi Base Camp.

== Adams photograph ==
The fighting in Saigon produced one of the Vietnam War's most famous images, photographer Eddie Adams' image of the summary execution of a VC prisoner on February 1, 1968. Nguyễn Văn Lém was captured by South Vietnamese national police, who identified him as the captain of a VC assassination and revenge platoon, and accused him of murdering the families of police officers. He was brought before Brigadier General Nguyễn Ngọc Loan, the chief of the National Police, who briefly questioned him. Loan then drew his sidearm and shot the prisoner. Nguyễn's motives may have been personal; he had been told by a subordinate that the suspect had killed his six godchildren and a police major who was Loan's aide-de-camp and one of his closest friends, including the major's family as well.

Present at the shooting were Adams and an NBC television news crew. The photograph appeared on front pages around the world and won the Pulitzer Prize for Spot News Photography, a World Press Photo award as well as seven other awards. The NBC film was played on the Huntley-Brinkley Report and elsewhere, in some cases the silent film embellished with the sound effect of a gunshot. General Westmoreland later wrote, "The photograph and film shocked the world, an isolated incident of cruelty in a broadly cruel war, but a psychological blow against the South Vietnamese nonetheless".

== Aftermath ==
By early February, the communist's high command realized that none of their military objectives were being met, and they halted any further attacks on fortified positions. Sporadic fighting continued in Saigon until March 8. Some sections of the city were left badly damaged by the combat and U.S. retaliatory air and artillery strikes in particular. The Chinese district of Cholon suffered especially, with perhaps hundreds of civilians killed in the American counterattacks.

As cited in the Spector book on page xvi, "From January to July 1968 the overall rate of men killed in action in Vietnam would reach an all time high and would exceed the rate for the Korean War and the Mediterranean and Pacific theaters during World War II. This was truly the bloodiest phase of the Vietnam War as well as the most neglected one."

The Vietcong attacked targets in and around Saigon with much success during the May Offensive from 5 to 30 May, 1968.

== Bibliography ==
- James R. Arnold (1990). The Tet Offensive 1968. Praeger Publishers. ISBN 0-275-98452-4.
- Ronald H. Spector (1993). After Tet. Free Press. ISBN 0-02-930380-X
- CBS news coverage (1968)
