= Lâm Quang Thơ =

South Vietnamese army general (1931–1985)

- Born: 8 February 1931; Bạc Liêu, French Indochina
- Died: 8 February 1985 (aged 54); San Francisco, California, United States
- Relatives: Lâm Quang Thi
- Military career
- Allegiance: South Vietnam
- Branch: Army of the Republic of Vietnam
- Service years: 1950–1975
- Rank: Major general
- Commands: Vietnamese National Military Academy; 18th Division
- Conflicts: Vietnam War

Lâm Quang Thơ (8 February 1931 – 1985) was a major general in the South Vietnamese Army of the Republic of Vietnam (ARVN).

== Early life and family ==
Thơ was born in Bac Lieu on February 8, 1931, to a family of wealthy landowning farmers.

== Military career ==
Thơ joined the Vietnamese National Army in 1950 and graduated from the Vietnamese National Military Academy in Da Lat.

In September 1966, COMUSMACV General William Westmoreland directed General John F. Freund to examine the ARVN officer training programme of the National Military Academy, believing it should reflect a leadership philosophy stressing "the obligation and responsibility of the graduates to the country as opposed to self-interest." According to the American advisers at the academy, the commandant, Thơ, was one of the least effective ARVN general officers.

In August 1969, Thơ was appointed commander of the 18th Division, replacing the inept Đỗ Kế Giai; however Thơ turned out equally bad in the eyes of his US advisers. One MACV evaluation later described Tho as a "highly respected and admired general", while another judged him to be a "coward and military incompetent".

In April 1972, Thơ was replaced as commander of the 18th Division by Colonel Lê Minh Đảo, and he returned to command the National Military Academy.

In late March 1975, as the People's Army of Vietnam's 1975 spring offensive overran large swathes of South Vietnam, Thơ was ordered to defend Dalat. However, seeing that the area was almost surrounded and knowing that the cadets would be needed to rebuild the shattered ARVN, Thơ instead secured Route 11 to Phan Rang, and on the night of 31 March all cadets and instructors were loaded onto trucks and driven to Phan Rang, arriving the next morning. With only disorganised Regional Forces left to defend the city, it was captured with minimal resistance by the PAVN 812th Regiment on 3 April.

== Honours ==
- Commander of the National Order of Vietnam
