= 18th Division (South Vietnam) =

Army of the Republic of Vietnam (ARVN)

- Sư đoàn 18
- ARVN 18 Division insignia
- Active: 16 May 1965 – 30 April 1975
- Country: South Vietnam
- Branch: Army of the Republic of Vietnam
- Type: Division
- Role: Infantry
- Nickname: "The Supermen"
- Motto: God Arrow – Defending the Fatherland
- Engagements: Vietnam War: Operation Santa Fe; Operation Toan Thang I; Operation Goodwood; Easter Offensive; Battle of Loc Ninh; Battle of An Lộc; Battle of Svay Rieng; Battle of the Iron Triangle; Battle of Xuân Lộc

Commanders
- Notable commanders: Lữ Mộng Lan; Đỗ Kế Giai; Lâm Quang Thơ; Lê Minh Đảo

Insignia
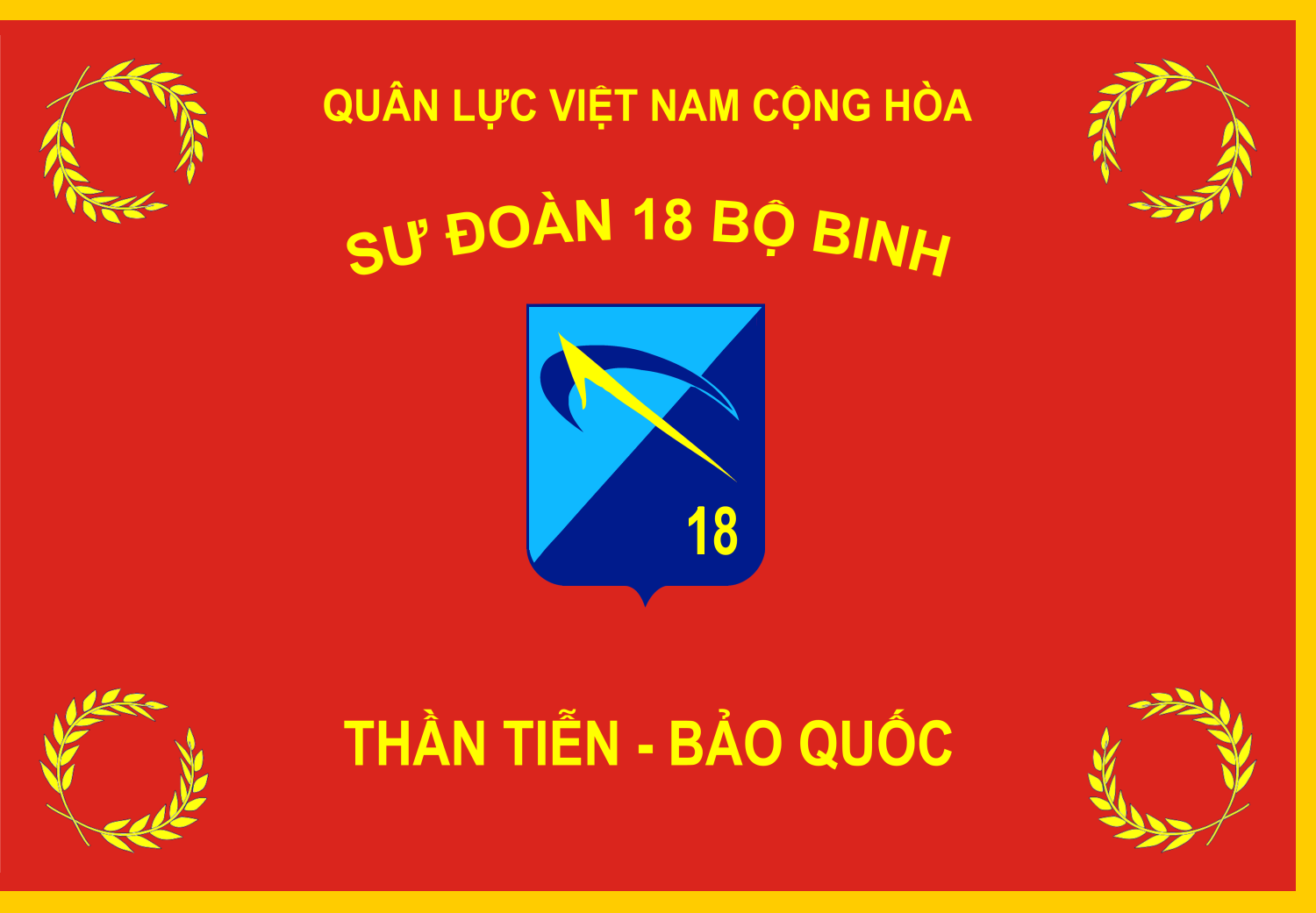
- Division flag

The 18th Division (Vietnamese: Sư đoàn 18; Chữ Hán: 師團18) was an infantry division in the III Corps of the Army of the Republic of Vietnam (ARVN). The U.S. Military Assistance Command Vietnam considered the 18th as undisciplined and was well known throughout the ARVN for its "cowboy" reputation. In 1975 the 18th was made famous for its tenacious defense of Xuân Lộc, the last major battle before the Fall of Saigon.

== History ==
=== 1965-1971 ===
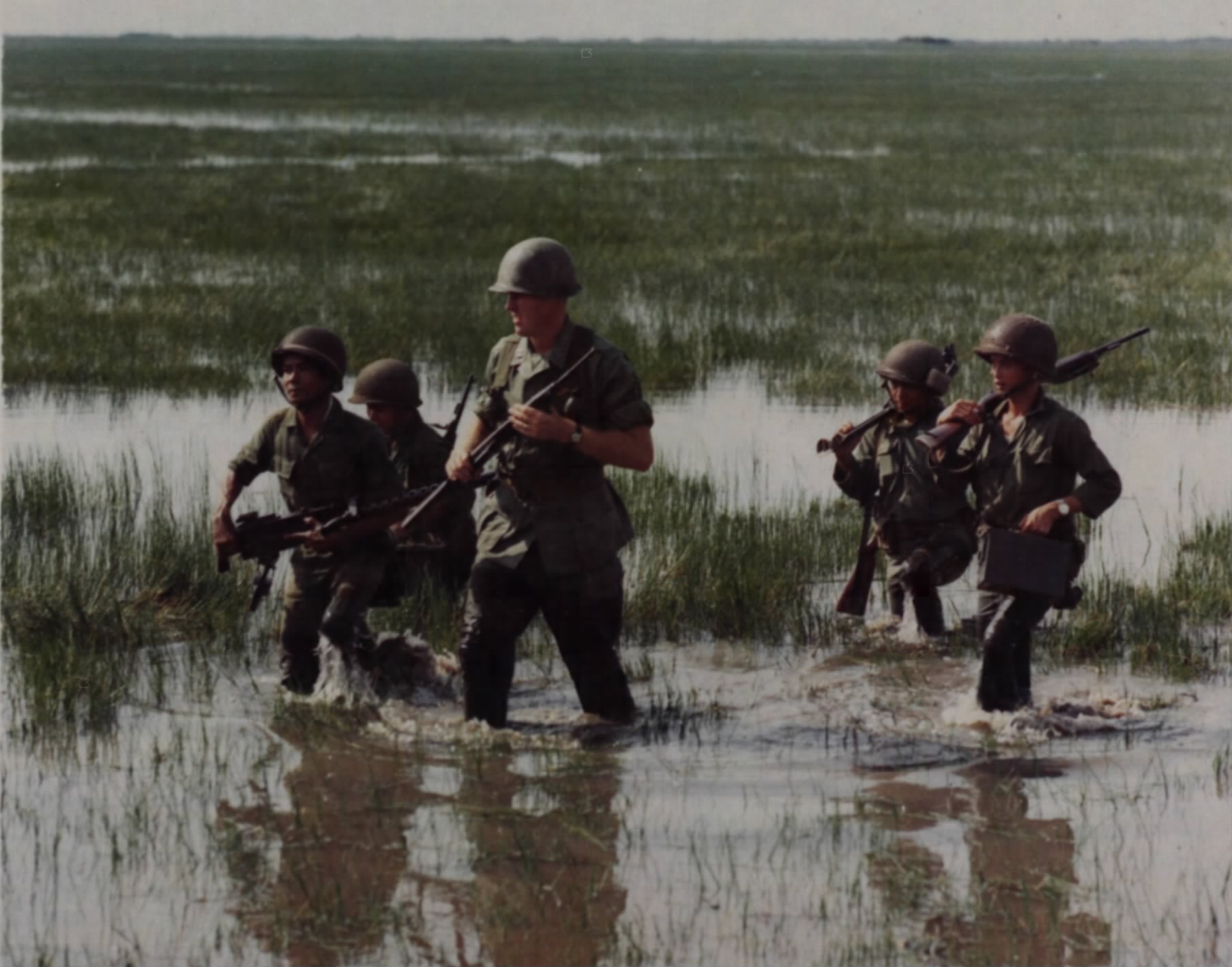
A machine gun crew from the 1st Battalion, 52nd Infantry Regiment and their US adviser wade through a rice paddy, 27 August 1964

The division was initially activated as the 10th Infantry Division in May 1965 under the command of General Lữ Mộng Lan. Headquartered in Long Khánh province, it assumed responsibility for the defense of eastern III Corps. The move reflected concern over the increased threat that had emerged in the area during the Vietcong (VC) Winter-Spring Offensive, as well as dissatisfaction with the ability of special zones to adequately meet their duties. The presence of a division commander, with a larger staff and resources would it was hoped, redress these issues. Preexisting elements began functioning under the new headquarters immediately, but the division was not declared operational until mid-July. Formal activation occurred in August.

By the end of 1965 US advisers to the division regarded Lan as "moody and vacillatory" and "a marginal commander who would have to be worked with." They gave Lan high marks for his "perceptiveness and dexterity in civil affairs and troop morale" but saw his interest in local politics as too distracting. Although they found his three regimental commanders "capable and willing people," they felt that it was too early to judge if the division was going to jell into a fighting unit. COMUSMACV General William Westmoreland predicted that combined operations with the US 1st Infantry Division and the 173rd Airborne Brigade would inspire the division to higher standards.

In early May 1966 Westmoreland suggested a "buddy" effort, matching the US 173d Airborne Brigade and the 1st Australian Task Force (1ATF) with the division.

In 1967 MACV assessed that the three ARVN divisions surrounding Saigon, the division, 5th and the 25th Divisions had shown no improvement, and US advisers considered their commanders, Generals Đỗ Kế Giai, Pham Quoc Thuan (5th Division) and Phan Trong Chinh (25th Division), flatly incompetent. The senior Junta generals had repeatedly agreed on the need to replace them, but, for political reasons, had taken no action. Civil Operations and Revolutionary Development Support (CORDS) leader Robert Komer accused several battalion commanders in the division of using the new pacification mission as an excuse to withdraw from all meaningful operations, except to provide for their own self-protection.

On 27/8 June 1967 units of the division engaged forces from the VC 5th Division near Tuc Trung and had to be assisted by the US 1st Squadron, 11th Armored Cavalry Regiment which was conducting Operation Akron. ARVN losses were 51 killed, but they killed 167 VC while US forces claimed a further 49.

From 3 November 1967 to 5 January 1968 the division participated in Operation Santa Fe, a security operation with the US 1st Brigade, 9th Infantry Division and 1ATF against the VC 5th Division's base in the May Tao Secret Zone.

From 8 April to 31 May 1968 the division participated in Operation Toan Thang I to continue pressure on PAVN/VC forces in III Corps after the successful Operation Quyet Thang. The operation involved nearly every combat unit in III Corps. The operation was a success with allied forces claiming 7,645 VC/PAVN killed, however the operation did not prevent the PAVN/VC from launching their May Offensive attacks against Saigon.

In September 1968 MACV rated Giai as inept and division advisers noted that the division was even a "laughing stock" to the Vietnamese. II Field Force, Vietnam commander Lieutenant general Walter T. Kerwin Jr. appealed to COMUSMACV General Creighton Abrams for help, and the MACV commander reportedly "raised hell" with President Nguyễn Văn Thiệu over the matter, but Thiệu, perhaps feeling safer with old friends like Giai around the capital to keep a watch on his rivals, did nothing.

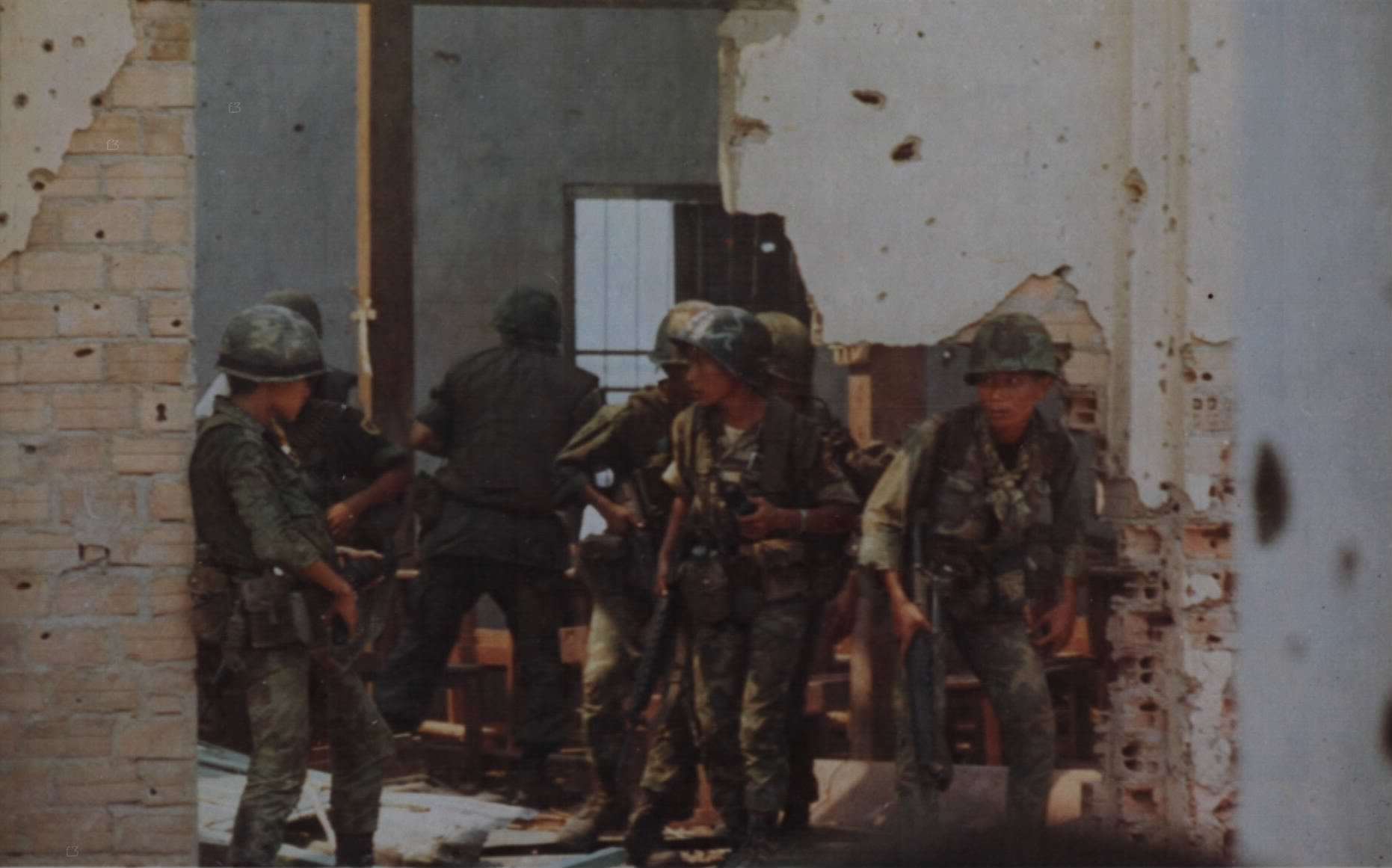
Men of the ARVN 5th Cavalry move from house to house as they search for hidden PAVN in Bien Hoa, 26 February 1969

On 15 January 1969 the Headquarters and 3rd Battalion 52nd Regiment and the 5th Marine Battalion joined Operation Goodwood with the 1st Australian Task Force (1ATF) replacing the 1st Marine Battalion.

In June 1969 the new II Field Force commander Lt. Gen. Julian Ewell initiated the Dong Tien (or "Progress Together") Program with III Corps commander, General Đỗ Cao Trí, to "buddy up US and ARVN units to conduct combined operations [that would]... maximize the effectiveness of both forces [and] achieve in 2, 3, or 4 months a quantum jump in ARVN and RF/PF performance." The US 199th Light Infantry Brigade moved to Xuan Loc, headquarters of the division, and began a series of combined operations with what was still considered one of the worst units in the ARVN.

In July 1969, Major General Roderick Wetherill, the IV Corps senior adviser, suggested deploying elements of the division out of the placid Saigon area and into the delta border regions where they might pick up some useful combat experience, however, Ewell treated the proposal as a joke saying "the 18th couldn't hit the ground with their hat in Delta terrain against the VC" and insisted they stay at home, out of harm's way. Abrams apparently agreed and let the matter drop.

From July to December 1969 division battalions were rotated through the 1ATF base at The Horseshoe for training in small arms handling and small unit tactics. The ARVN were described by the 1ATF deputy commander as "the worst battalion in the worst regiment in the worst division in the world." After training the ARVN units, mixed platoons would then mount patrol operations in the Horseshoe tactical area of responsibility.

In August 1969 Giai was finally replaced as division commander by General Lâm Quang Thơ, however, US officials had major reservations about this replacement, not regarding Tho as a dynamic leader. One MACV evaluation later described Tho as a "highly respected and admired general," while another judged him to be a "coward and military incompetent."

On 20 September 1971 the division base camp located 2 km west of Tây Ninh received 50 82 mm mortar rounds followed by a sapper attack by an estimated PAVN battalion. The PAVN lost 52 killed and 9 captured and 17 individual and two crew-served weapons, while the division lost 21 killed. On 22 September elements of the 1st Battalion, 43rd Infantry Regiment operating 12 km north of Tây Ninh engaged a PAVN force, supported by ARVN and U.S. artillery and U.S. helicopter gunships killing 20 PAVN and capturing 3 individual and four crew-served weapons.

=== Easter Offensive ===
During the Easter Offensive in late March 1972 the Division's 2nd Battalion, 52nd Infantry Regiment and 1st Battalion, 48th Infantry Regiment were both transferred to the 5th Division to serve as a border screen. During the Battle of Loc Ninh, on 6 April 5 Division commander Brigadier general Lê Văn Hưng organised the two Battalions as Task Force 52 and ordered them to move north to relieve the 9th Infantry Regiment under siege in Lộc Ninh. As the 2nd Battalion to advance towards Lộc Ninh it was ambushed at the junction of National Highway 13 and Route 17. Unable to withstand the VC's superior firepower, it was forced to withdraw. To prevent Task Force 52 from evacuating to either Lộc Ninh or An Lộc, the VC pursued Task Force 52 and bombarded their bases with heavy artillery throughout the day. As Lộc Ninh fell on the morning of 7 April at 09:00 Hưng ordered Task Force 52 to abandon its bases, destroy all heavy weapons and vehicles, and withdraw to An Lộc, following their failed attempt at reinforcing Lộc Ninh. As Task Force 52 tried to break through National Highway 13, they ran into another large VC ambush. It would take the soldiers of Task Force 52 about a week to reach An Lộc, infiltrating through PAVN/VC positions along the main road. The next step in the offensive was the Battle of An Lộc.

On 13/4 June a regiment of the division was landed in An Lộc to reinforce the exhausted 5th Division. On 11 July the entire division arrived at An Lộc to replace the 5th Division. The division would spread out from An Lộc and push the PAVN back, increasing control in the area. On 8 August the division launched an assault to retake Quản Lợi Base Camp but were stopped by the PAVN in the base's reinforced concrete bunkers. A further attack was launched on 9 August with limited gains and attacks on the base continued for the next 2 weeks eventually gaining one third of the base. The ARVN finally attacked the PAVN occupied bunkers with TOW missiles and M-202 rockets and this broke the PAVN defense forcing the remaining defenders to flee the base.

Following the battle Col. Lê Minh Đảo was appointed to replace General Tho in command of the division.

In late November the division was replaced at An Lộc by the 3rd, 5th and 6th Ranger Groups.

=== 1973–74 ===
In April 1974 during the Battle of Svay Rieng a battalion from the division formed part of the reserves for the battle and another battalion formed part of a task force that swept PAVN base areas in the Angel's Wing (11.03°N 106.163°E) area of Cambodia.

From 16 May to 2 July 1974 the division fought the PAVN 7th and 9th Divisions in the Battle of the Iron Triangle, until relieved by the 5th Division. In mid-November the 48th and 52nd Regiments rejoined the battle in its final phases.

On 9 December in response to the PAVN 812th Regiment attack on Tánh Linh District III Corps ordered the division, with the 7th Ranger Group attached, from Xuân Lộc to reinforce the territorials in Bình Tuy Province. When the 32d Ranger Battalion fell into a well-laid ambush along Route 333 and sustained heavy casualties, it became clear that the PAVN 33rd Regiment was not going to permit the reinforcement of Bình Tuy to proceed without a fight. Later the 1st and 2d Battalions of the 48th Regiment joined the attack along Route 333 and were soon in heavy combat north of Gia Ray. In the days that followed, the 85th Ranger Battalion made it a four-battalion task force pushing up Route 333, but the lead elements never made it past Gia Huynh, still 16 km south of Hoai Duc. The PAVN 33rd Regiment was dug in along the road, well supported by mortars and artillery. On 17 December Duy Can Village, between Vo Xu and Tanh Linh, was overrun by the PAVN 812th Regiment, and the few survivors of the 700th RF Company struggled into Tánh Linh. Although outposts still in ARVN hands, as well as Hoai Duc and Tánh Linh were receiving heavy indirect fire, General Dư Quốc Đống, commanding III Corps ordered the division not try to press forward past Gia Huynh on Route 333. With his Corps under attack from Tay Ninh to Phuoc Long, he was unwilling to risk having four of his battalions cut off and decimated. Meanwhile, the PAVN blew a bridge south of Hoai Duc, occupied Vo Xu, and increased the intensity of its attack on Tánh Linh. Following a 3,000 round bombardment on 23 and 24 December, the PAVN launched five successive assaults, finally overrunning the last defenses in Tánh Linh on 25 December. Hoai Duc, meanwhile, was under attack by the PAVN 274th Infantry, 6th Division. After the PAVN 274th Regiment had penetrated the local defenses of Hoai Duc and had gained a foothold in the northeastern and southwestern edges of the town, the division moved the 1st and 2nd Battalions, 43rd Regiment by helicopter west and north of the town respectively, and began pushing the PAVN out. While two battalions of the 48th Regiment held their positions on Route 333 north of Gia Ray, the tired and depleted 7th Ranger Group was withdrawn to Binh Duong Province to rest and refit. Since all available battalions of the division had been committed, the JGS moved the 4th Ranger Group from Kontum to Long Binh where it was rested and re-equipped and made available to Đống as a reserve.

=== 1975 ===
The division's counterattack to drive the PAVN out of Hoai Duc District progressed slowly but steadily, amply supported by RVNAF air strikes, and the PAVN 274th Regiment was forced to give ground as casualties mounted. Meanwhile, leaving a small occupying force in Tánh Linh, the PAVN 812th Regiment, battered by air strikes, pulled back into the safety of the deep jungle between Tánh Linh and Hoai Duc. The PAVN 33rd Regiment, its ranks also depleted during an intense, month-long campaign, still held roadblocks along Route 333 in mid-January but was feeling the pressure of the division battalions pushing in both directions along the road. During the last week of January 1975, the ARVN had the road cleared from Gia Ray to Hoai Duc and by February had reoccupied the village of Vo Xu. The Bình Tuy campaign was over, losses had been high for both sides and the remote eastern sector of the province remained in PAVN control. The ARVN still controlled the most populous area of the province and prevented the PAVN 6th Division from permanently closing the province's two major highways, 20 and 1, which passed Bình Tuy Province on the north and south. To forestall any PAVN attempt to reassert control in the recovered areas, the new III Corps commander, Lt. Gen. Nguyễn Văn Toàn, ordered the division to maintain a sizable force in Bình Tuy, but to prepare for employment elsewhere as the Corps' reserve. As of mid-February, the 43rd Regiment was along Route 333 between Hoai Duc and Gia Huynh; the 52nd Regiment headquarters with its 2nd Battalion was at the division base at Xuân Lộc while its 1st and 3rd Battalions operated in Định Quán District and Gia Ray, respectively; and the 48th Regiment was in Corps' reserve at Long Binh Post.

On 14 March Toàn ordered the 48th Regiment, reinforced with armored personnel carriers from Corps' reserve in Long Binh to reinforce Khiem Hanh and Go Dau Ha. While a battalion of the 48th Regiment attacked west out of Go Dau Ha to clear Route 1 to the Cambodian frontier, the 46th Regiment attacked north along Route 22 to help territorials clear the road to Tây Ninh against heavy resistance and intense artillery fire, however, Route 22 between Go Dau Ha and Tây Ninh remained closed. The rest of the division was spread out, with the 1st Battalion, 43rd Regiment securing Route 20 north of Xuân Lộc, the 2nd Battalion was south of Định Quán and the 3rd Battalion was in Hoai Duc District Town in Bình Tuy Province. The 52nd Regiment, minus its 3rd Battalion on Route 1 between Bien Hoa and Xuân Lộc, was in Xuân Lộc with elements operating northwest of the town.

The PAVN began their Long Khánh-Bình Tuy campaign with strong attacks against ARVN positions on the two principal lines of communication in the region, Highways 1 and 20 striking outposts, towns, bridges and culverts north and east of Xuan Loc. On 17 March, the PAVN 209th Infantry Regiment and the 210th Artillery Regiment, 7th Division, opened what was to become the Battle of Xuân Lộc. The 209th struck first at Định Quán, north of Xuân Lộc, and at the La Nga bridge, west of Định Quán. Eight tanks supported the initial assault on Định Quán, and PAVN artillery fire destroyed four 155 mm howitzers supporting the territorials. Anticipating the attack, Đảo had reinforced the La Nga bridge the day before, but the intense fire forced a withdrawal from the bridge. After repeated assaults, the 209th Infantry penetrated Định Quán and the 2nd Battalion, 43rd Infantry, as well as the RF battalion were forced to withdraw with heavy losses on 18 March.

Also on 17 March, the 3rd Battalion, 43rd Regiment killed 10 PAVN in heavy fighting northwest of Hoai Duc. At the same time another outpost of Xuân Lộc District, Ong Don, defended by an RF company and an artillery platoon, came under artillery and infantry attack. The PAVN assault was repulsed with heavy losses on both sides, and another RF company, sent to reinforce, ran into strong resistance on Highway 1 west of Ong Don. North of Ong Don, Gia Ray on Route 333 was under attack by the PAVN 274th Infantry Regiment, 6th Division. The division headquarters therefore realized that two PAVN divisions, the 6th and the 7th, were committed in Long Khánh. While the battle raged at Gia Ray, another post on Highway 1 west of Ong Don came under attack. Meanwhile, a bridge and a culvert on Highway 1 on each side of the Route 332 junction were blown up by PAVN sappers. Thus, all ARVN forces east of Route 332 were isolated from Xuân Lộc by formidable obstacles and PAVN roadblocks. North from Xuan Loc, on Route 20, hamlets along the road were occupied in varying degrees by PAVN soldiers, and the territorial outpost far to the northeast near the Lam Dong boundary was overrun. Đảo decided to counterattack up Route 20 with his 52nd Regiment, minus one battalion but reinforced with the 5th Armored Cavalry Squadron from Tây Ninh province. The regiment was ordered to clear the road as far as Định Quán, but the attack quickly stalled as it met heavy resistance well short of its objective.

Evidence of increasing heavy PAVN commitments in Long Khánh flowed into III Corps headquarters in Bien Hoa. The PAVN 141st Regiment, 7th Division, had apparently participated in the attack on Định Quán. Hoai Duc was overrun by the PAVN 812th Regiment, 6th Division, while that division's other two regiments, the 33rd and 274th, seized Gia Ray. The ARVN outpost on the conical peak of Chua Chan, standing 2,200 feet (670 m) above Xuân Lộc and providing excellent observation, also fell to PAVN 6th Division forces and Xuân Lộc itself began to receive artillery fire, including 105 mm. Toàn responded to the burgeoning threat on his eastern flank first by sending the 5th Armored Cavalry Squadron and then one battalion of the 48th Regiment from Tây Ninh to Long Khánh.

The rest of the 48th Regiment was still heavily engaged near Go Dau Ha. The 3rd Battalion made contact with a PAVN company west of the Vàm Cỏ Đông River on 17 March, killed 36, and captured a number of weapons. On 26 March Toàn sent the headquarters and two battalions of the 48th Regiment to reinforce Khiem Hanh.

On 1 April, Toàn returned the headquarters and two battalions of the 48th Regiment to the division. The regiment moved to the Xuân Lộc area but sent its 2nd Battalion down to Hàm Tân District on the coast of Bình Tuy Province to secure the city and port while large numbers of refugees poured into the province from the north. About 500 troops, survivors of the 2nd Division, were among those arriving from I Corps. When reorganized and reequipped, they would take over the security mission in Hàm Tân. The 52nd Regiment meanwhile was pressing forward on Route 20 south of Định Quán and in sharp fighting on 1 April killed over 50 PAVN troops. The 43rd Regiment was fighting east along Route 1, near Xuân Lộc and in contact with a major PAVN force.

After the first PAVN attempt to seize Xuân Lộc had been soundly repulsed, the PAVN 341st Division on 9 April began a second assault on the town. Infantry and tanks were preceded by an artillery bombardment of about 4,000 rounds, one of the heaviest in the war. With tanks firing down the streets, hand-to-hand fighting developed in a fierce battle that lasted until dusk. By that time the 43rd Regiment had driven most of the shattered PAVN force from the town, and the 52nd Regiment base on Route 20 was still in ARVN hands. The PAVN resumed the attack the next day, this time committing the 165th Regiment of the 7th Division along with regiments of the 6th and 34lst Divisions; again the attack failed. West of Xuân Lộc, between Trảng Bom and the intersection of Highways 1 and 20, the ARVN 322nd Task Force and 1st Airborne Brigade (two battalions) were trying to force their way east against stiff resistance. The PAVN attacked the rear base of the 52nd Regiment on Route 20, the 43rd Infantry in Xuân Lộc and the 82nd Ranger Battalion on 11 April, the third day of the battle. At that time the battalion of the 48th Regiment securing Hàm Tân went back to Xuân Lộc and the 1st Airborne Brigade moved in closer to the town. Task Force 322 was making very slow progress opening the road from Trảng Bom to Xuân Lộc, and Toàn ordered Task Force 315 from Cu Chi to reinforce. On the 12th battalions of the 52nd Regiment were still in heavy fighting north of Xuân Lộc, but the town, although demolished, was still held by the 43rd Regiment. PAVN losses to that point were probably in excess of 800 killed, five captured, 300 weapons captured and 11 T-54 tanks destroyed. ARVN casualties had been moderate. Most of the 43rd Regiment was holding east of the town; the 48th was southwest; the 1st Airborne Brigade was south but moving north toward the 82d Ranger Battalion; and the 322 Task Force was on Route 1 west of the Route 20 junction attacking toward Xuân Lộc. Two resupply missions were flown into the besieged town; on 12 April CH-47 helicopters brought in 93 tons of artillery ammunition and followed with 100 tons the next day. Meanwhile, the RVNAF airplanes flying against intense antiaircraft fire, took a heavy toll of the PAVN divisions around Xuân Lộc. At 14:00 on 12 April an RVNAF C-130 Hercules dropped two CBU-55 Fuel Air Explosive bombs on PAVN positions in the town of Xuan Vinh, close to Xuân Lộc, killing about 200 PAVN soldiers. It was the only time the CBU was used in combat during the war. The PAVN assault resumed on 13 April. By this time, seven of the nine regiments of the 6th, 7th and 341st Divisions had been committed to the battle. The attack began at 04:50 against the headquarters and 1st Battalion, 43rd Regiment, and lasted until 09:30. When the PAVN withdrew, they left 235 dead and about 30 weapons on the field. The attack picked up again at noon and lasted until 15:00, but the 43rd, with heavy RVNAF support held. Meanwhile, the 1st Airborne Brigade continued to attack north toward Xuân Lộc and Task Force 322, now reinforced by the 315th and 316th Task Forces, struck from the west. RVNAF observers had discovered two batteries of 130 mm guns northeast of Xuân Lộc and took them under attack. The PAVN continued sending additional forces into III Corps with the 320B and 325th Divisions moving to Long Khánh where they entered the battle on 15 April. An artillery bombardment of 1,000 rounds fell on the headquarters and 3rd Battalion, 52nd Regiment, an artillery battalion, and elements of the 5th Armored Cavalry Squadron, four 155 mm and eight 105 mm howitzers were destroyed, and the PAVN infantry and tank attack forced the battered ARVN force back along Route 1. The armored task forces on Route 1 had to pull back also; half of their equipment had been destroyed. The 1st Airborne Brigade, frustrated in its attack toward Xuân Lộc, withdrew through the plantations and jungles toward Bà Rịa in Phước Tuy Province.

On 19 April as the JGS ordered a general withdrawal from Xuân Lộc, a new defensive line was formed east of Bien Hoa at the town of Trảng Bom which was defended by the remnants of the division, the 468th Marine Brigade and the reconstituted 258th Marine Brigade. At 04:00 on 27 April the PAVN 341st Division attacked Trang Bom, the initial attack was repulsed but by 08:00 attacks on the flanks broke through and the town was captured with the division suffering heavy casualties in their retreat. The PAVN then advanced to the town of Hố Nai (now Tân Hòa), which was held by the Marines. Hố Nai was defended by the 6th Marine Battalion, an M48 tank from the 3rd Armored and Popular Forces. Following an artillery barrage the PAVN attacked Hố Nai, but were met by ARVN artillery losing 30 dead and one T-54 tank destroyed before they pulled back. On 28 April the 341st renewed their attack using five T-54s supported by an infantry regiment, but were repulsed in three separate attacks losing three T-54s and many soldiers. On 29 April the entire 341st Division attacked Hố Nai and were again repulsed in two hours of fighting. At midday the Marines were ordered to withdraw to defend Bien Hoa and Long Binh. Brigadier General Trần Quang Khôi, commander of the 3rd Armored was given responsibility for defending Bien Hoa, although PAVN shelling had rendered the base unusable. Seeing the regular forces leaving Hố Nai the PAVN renewed their assault at midnight on 30 April, but the town's Popular Forces fought back and were not subdued until dawn. The PAVN then advanced to Bien Hoa, where they were met by the 3rd Armored, at this point the PAVN 4th Corps changed the axis of their advance to the south. On the morning of 30 April the division and Marines were ordered to retreat from Long Binh to the west bank of the Đồng Nai river, while the 81st Rangers held Bien Hoa Air Base and the 3rd Armored held Bien Hoa. The 3rd Armored was moving from Bien Hoa to attack PAVN forces when they heard the surrender broadcast of President Dương Văn Minh and Khôi halted his advance and disbanded the unit. The 81st Rangers had abandoned the base and had moved west of the Đồng Nai river when they heard the surrender broadcast and then marched towards Saigon to surrender to the PAVN.

== Organisation ==
Component units:

- 43rd Infantry Regiment
- 48th Infantry Regiment
- 52nd Infantry Regiment
- 180th, 181st, 182nd and 183rd Artillery Battalions
- 5th Armored Cavalry Squadron
- US Advisory Team 87
