= Đỗ Kế Giai =

South Vietnamese major general (1929–2016)

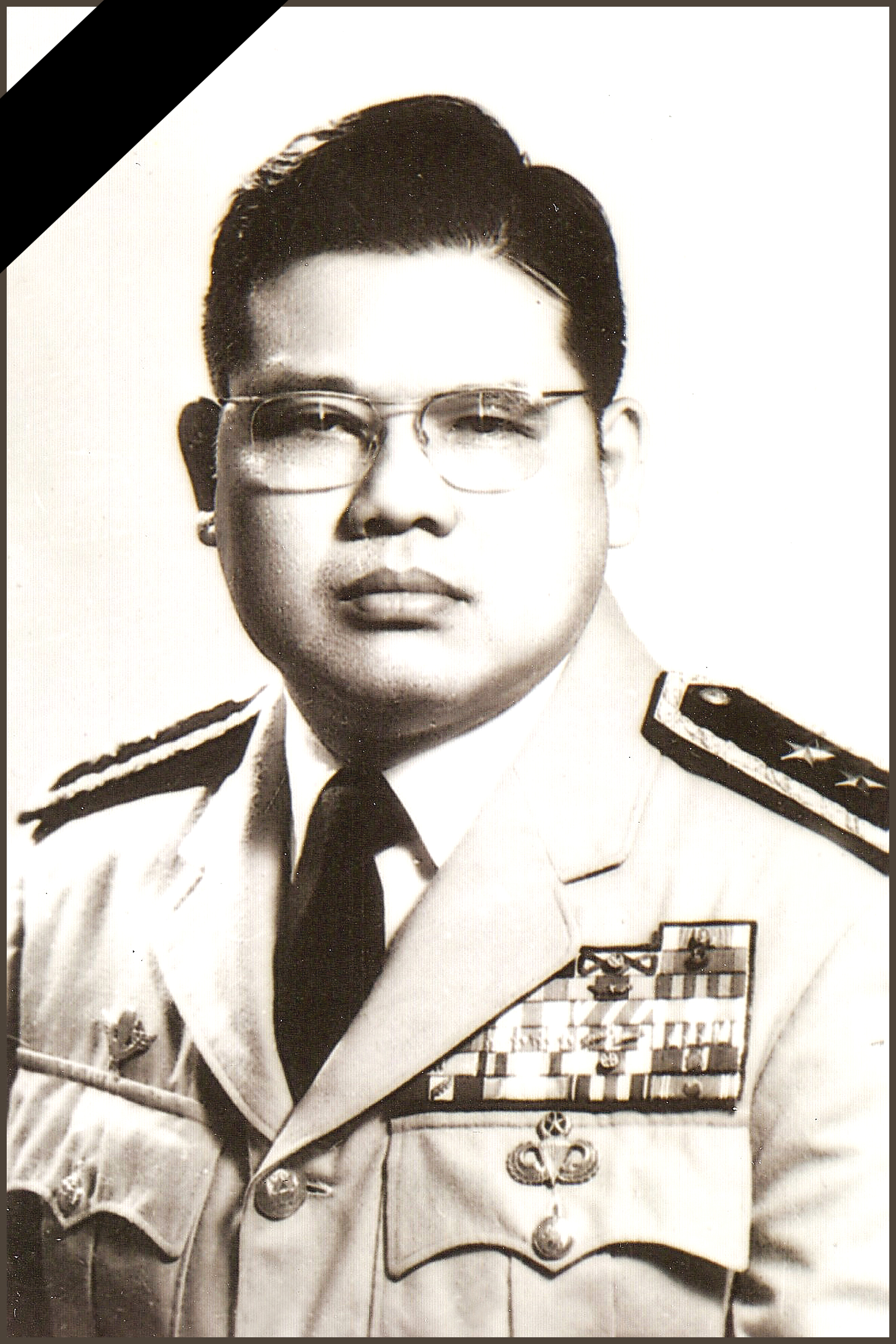
- Major general Giai
- Born: 6 June 1929; Bến Tre
- Died: 21 February 2016 (aged 86)
- Allegiance: Republic of Vietnam
- Service years: 1951–1975
- Rank: Major General
- Commands: 18th Division

Đỗ Kế Giai (6 June 1929 – 21 February 2016) was a South Vietnamese major general who led the 18th Division of the Army of the Republic of Vietnam (ARVN).

== Early life ==
He was born on 6 June 1929, into a family of landowners in Bến Tre, southwestern Vietnam. In 1949, he graduated from the Nguyen Dinh Chieu High School in Mỹ Tho with a partial Baccalauréat (Part I).

== Military career ==
In June 1951 he enlisted in the French Union Army and attended the 5th course Hoang Dieu at the Dalat Military Academy. On 24 April 1952, he graduated with the rank of second lieutenant. After graduation, he was selected to serve in the 3rd Vietnamese Parachute Battalion stationed in Hanoi. He was then transferred to the Vietnamese National Army. In late July 1954, he was promoted to Lieutenant and moved with his unit to the southern garrison in Nha Trang.

In late October 1955, after transferring to the ARVN, he was promoted to captain. In August 1957, he was appointed commander of the 6th Airborne Battalion. In October 1959, he was promoted to Major in office.

In mid-November 1961, he was appointed commander of the newly formed 2nd Airborne Task Force. In August 1963, he attended the United States Army Command and General Staff College at Fort Leavenworth, Kansas. In early 1964, he resumed his former position. In early 1965, he was promoted to lieutenant colonel and handed over the 2nd Airborne Task Force. He was then transferred to the position of chief of staff of the 25th Infantry Division.

In September 1966, he was promoted to colonel and appointed commander of the 10th Infantry Division (later renamed as the 18th Division). On 1 November 1967, he was promoted to brigadier general in office.

In 1967 Military Assistance Command, Vietnam (MACV) assessed that the three ARVN divisions surrounding Saigon, the 18th, 5th and the 25th Division had shown no improvement, and US advisers considered their commanders, Giai, Phạm Quốc Thuần (5th Division) and Phan Trọng Chinh (25th Division), flatly incompetent. The senior South Vietnamese military junta generals had repeatedly agreed on the need to replace them, but, for political reasons, had taken no action.

In September 1968 MACV rated Giai as inept and division advisers noted that the division was even a "laughing stock" to the Vietnamese. II Field Force, Vietnam commander Lt. Gen. Walter T. Kerwin Jr. appealed to COMUSMACV General Creighton Abrams for help, and the MACV commander reportedly "raised hell" with President Nguyễn Văn Thiệu over the matter, but Thiệu, perhaps feeling safer with old friends like Giai around the capital to keep a watch on his rivals, did nothing.

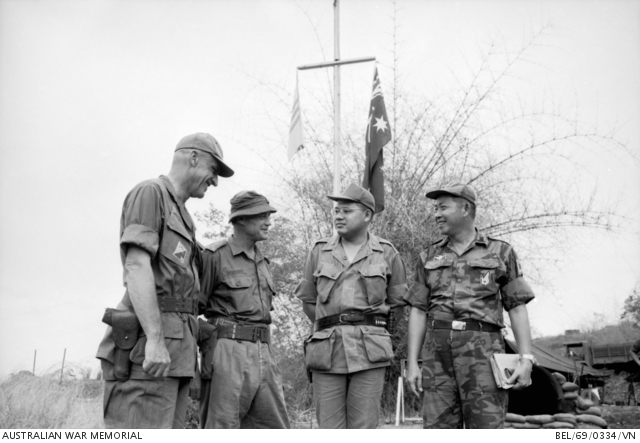
Giai (2nd from right) at Nui Dat in May 1969

In August 1969 Giai was finally replaced as 18th Division commander by General Lam Quang Tho.

Giai was subsequently assigned to serve on the Joint General Staff. In August 1972, he was appointed commander of the Ranger Group located at Dao Ba Phuoc camp near Saigon. On 1 April 1974, he was promoted to major general in office.

Following the Fall of Saigon on 30 April 1975, he was sent to a re-education camp for 17 years.

== Later life ==
On 5 May 1992 he was released from captivity. On 26 October 1993, he left Vietnam under the Orderly Departure Program sponsored by the U.S. Government. He was later reunited with his family in Garland, Texas.

He died on 21 February 2016 at his home at the age of 87.

== Honour ==
=== National honours ===
- Officer of the National Order of Vietnam
- Army Distinguished Service Order, First Class
- Air Force Distinguished Service Order, First Class
- Gallantry Cross
- Air Gallantry Cross Bronze Wing
- Hazardous Service Medal
- Life Saving Medal
- Loyalty Medal
- Staff Service Medal, First Class
- Training Service Medal, Second Class
- Civil Actions Medal, First Class
- Good Conduct Medal, Second Class
- Vietnam Campaign Medal
- Military Service Medal, Second Class
- Air Service Medal, Third Class
- Chuong My Medal, First Class
- Administrative Service Medal, Second Class
- Rural Revolutionary Development Medal

=== Foreign honour ===
- USA :
  - Silver Star
