= Operation Santa Fe =

Part of the Vietnam War (1967–1968)

- Part of the Vietnam War
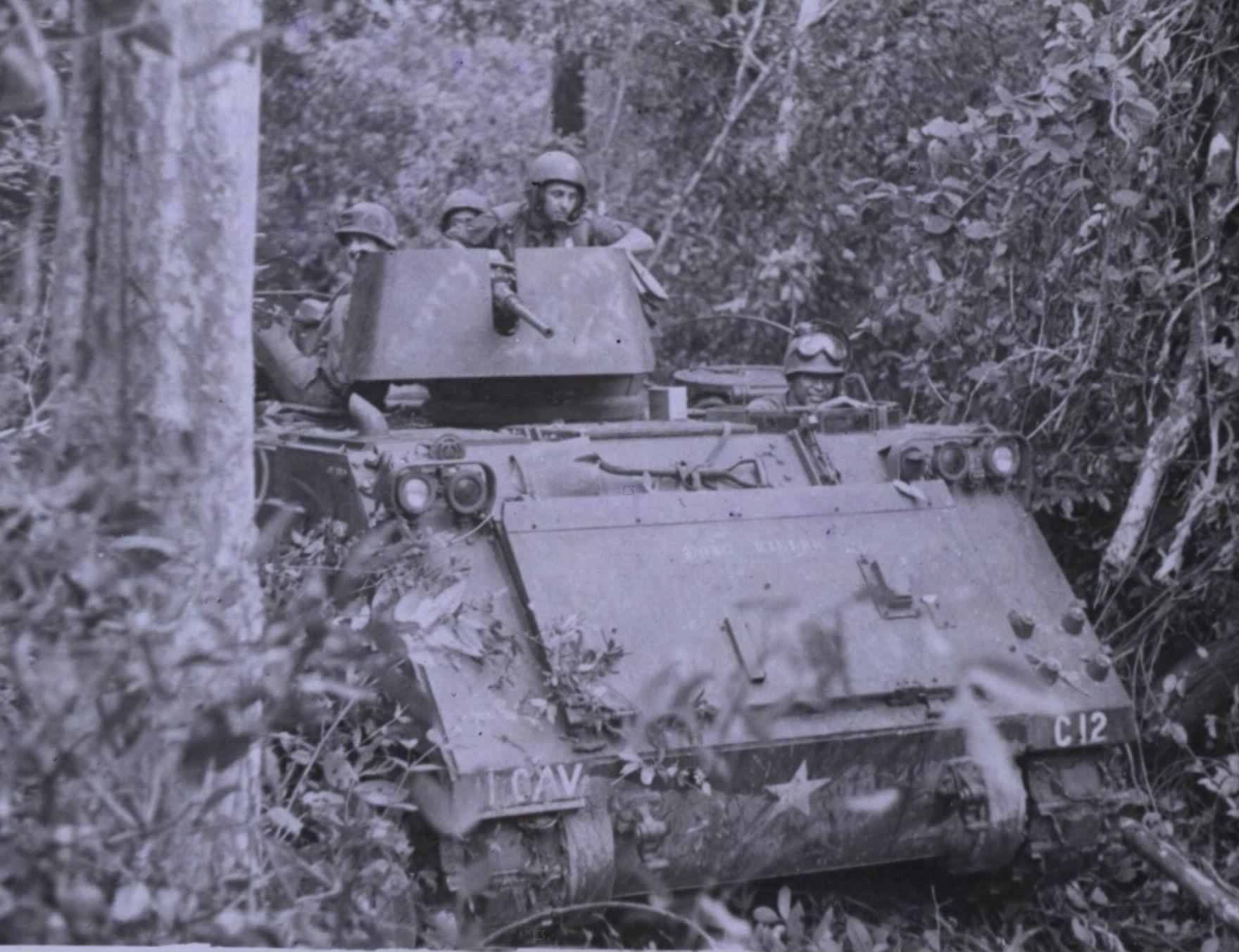
- M113 APC from Troop B, 1st Squadron, 11th Armored Cavalry Regiment moves through heavy brush
| Date | 3 November 1967 – 5 January 1968 |
| Location | May Tao Secret Zone (now part of Bà Rịa–Vũng Tàu, Binh Thuan, Dong Nai Province), South Vietnam |
| Result | Allies claim operational success |

Belligerents
| United States; Australia; South Vietnam | Viet Cong |

Commanders and leaders
| MG George G. O'Connor | |

Units involved
| (United States) 1st Brigade, 9th Infantry Division (Australia) 1st Australian Task Force (South Vietnam) 18th Division, 43rd regiment | 5th Division |

Casualties and losses
| (United States) 6 killed | Allied claims: 126 killed |

Operation Santa Fe was a security operation conducted during the Vietnam War by the U.S. 1st Brigade, 9th Infantry Division, the 1st Australian Task Force and the Army of the Republic of Vietnam (ARVN) 18th Division against the May Tao Secret Zone, South Vietnam from 3 November 1967 to 5 January 1968.

== Background ==
The operational plan was to destroy the Viet Cong (VC) 5th Division's base in the May Tao Secret Zone and to reopen and secure a 60 km stretch of Highway 1 from Xuân Lộc to the II Corps boundary that had been closed by VC activity since 1962.

== Operation ==
On 3 November the 4th Battalion, 39th Infantry Regiment was lifted by helicopters from Long Binh Post to a landing zone just north of the May Tao Secret Zone, under the protective cover of helicopter gunships from Troop D, 3rd Squadron, 5th Cavalry Regiment. The 4/39th Infantry secured the surrounding area and that afternoon a convoy carrying the 2nd Battalion, 47th Infantry Regiment and the forward headquarters of the 1st Brigade arrived at the landing zone. Engineer companies proceeded to establish Firebase Wildcat (10.813°N 107.576°E), the forward operating base for the operation.

The 11th Armored Cavalry Regiment and 7th Battalion, Royal Australian Regiment of the 1st Australian Task Force blocked the May Tao Secret Zone while the 1st Brigade, 9th Infantry Division, swept the area meeting only scattered resistance. It became clear that the VC 5th Division was not in the zone and intelligence indicated that the division's headquarters and the 275th Regiment had moved north into Sông Bé Province, the 274th Regiment was in Hát Dịch and the rest of the division had withdrawn to War Zone D in northern Long Khánh Province. By 1 December, the 1st Brigade had destroyed approximately 1,000 fortifications within the Zone.

With the May Tao Secret Zone neutralized and Highway 1 secured, units from the 15th and 86th Engineer Battalions repaired or replaced 11 bridges, resurfaced the road and created a cleared zone of 100m on each side of the Highway. The engineers also built Regional Force bases along the Highway to support road security and pacification.

== Aftermath ==
The operation ended on 5 January 1968, VC losses were 126 killed while U.S. losses were six killed.
