= Operation Akron =

Part of the Vietnam War (1967)

- Part of the Vietnam War
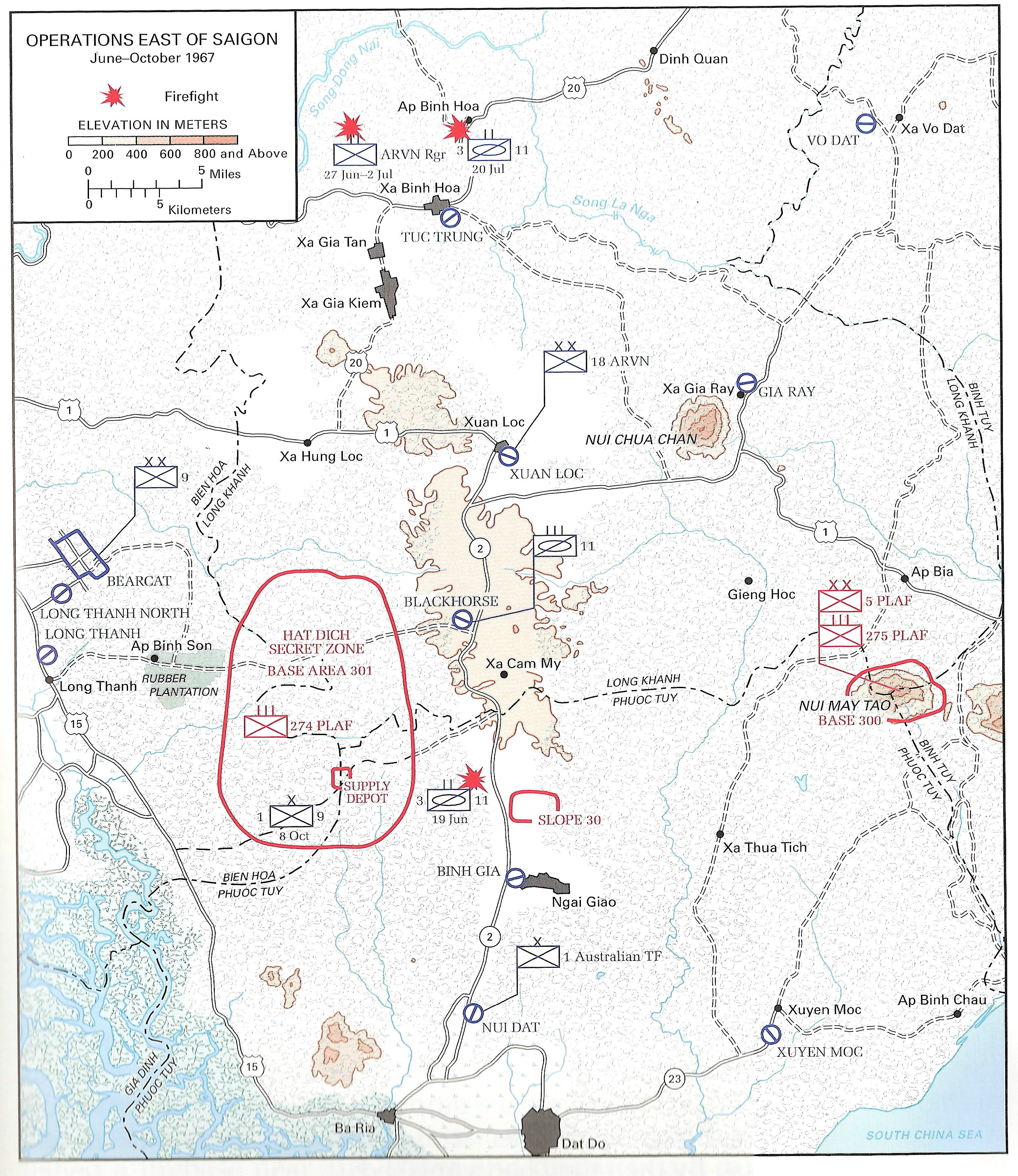
- Map showing the operation area
Date	9–29 June 1967
Location	Hát Dịch, South Vietnam 11.166°N 106.666°E

Belligerents
United States; South Vietnam	Viet Cong

Commanders and leaders
(United States) MG George G. O'Connor (South Vietnam) General Đỗ Kế Giai	Senior Col. Nguyen The Truyen

Units involved
(United States) 1st Brigade, 9th Infantry Division (United States) 1st & 3rd Squadrons, 11th Armored Cavalry Regiment (South Vietnam) 18th Division	5th Division

Casualties and losses
(United States) 9 killed (South Vietnam) 51 killed	412 killed

Operation Akron was an operation in the Vietnam War conducted by the U.S. 1st Brigade, 9th Infantry Division and the 1st & 3rd Squadrons, 11th Armored Cavalry Regiment (11th ACR) and Army of the Republic of Vietnam (ARVN) Rangers and 18th Division elements in Hát Dịch, lasting from 9 to 29 June 1967.

== Background ==
Hát Dịch housed Base Area 301, a staging area for the Viet Cong (VC) 5th Division from which they could harass Highway 1, the main supply route between Biên Hòa and Xuân Lộc District and all points further north. They could also interdict Highway 15 to Vũng Tàu, Highway 2 into Phước Tuy Province and Highway 20 to Da Lat. While earlier operations had pushed the 5th Division east into the Mây Tào Mountains, they were expected to return to the Hát Dịch during the rainy season. In early June U.S. forces operating 15 km south of Blackhorse Base Camp observed PAVN moving towards the Hát Dịch.

9th Division commander MG George G. O'Connor devised the operation to clear the entire 250 square kilometers of Base Area 301. The 1st Brigade would move east from Highway 15 accompanied by an engineer task force. While the 1st Brigade provided protection, the engineers would use Rome plows to enlarge two parallel trails that eventually met east of Highway 2 and a third that joined the two in Hát Dịch. Simultaneously a squadron from the 11th Armored Cavalry Regiment would patrol with an ARVN Ranger battalion east of Hát Dịch.

== Operation ==
The operation commenced on 9 June and initially met little resistance. On 18 June the 3rd Squadron, 11th ACR located a recently abandoned VC camp on Slope 30 along Highway 2. That evening the 3/11th ACR established four separate night defensive positions west of Highway 2. At 01:00 on 19 January, the VC 1st Battalion, 274th Regiment attacked the northernmost defensive position which was the location of the squadron command post. The attack was beaten back after one hour by defensive fire, supporting artillery and helicopter gunships. 56 VC bodies were located around the perimeter, U.S. losses were nine killed.

On 26 June, a VC soldier defected at Tuc Trung on Highway 20, claiming to be from the 3rd Battalion, 275th Regiment and said that his unit was based 10 km northwest of Tuc Trung. On 27 June the ARVN 18th Division commander General Đỗ Kế Giai sent a Ranger unit to probe the campsite which they found to be abandoned, but fell into a VC ambush. A 1/11th ACR task force was dispatched to the scene that evening and the following morning arrived at the site of the battle finding ARVN and VC dead. Meanwhile, an ARVN Battalion had located the VC further east and were heavily engaged and the 1/11th ACR moved to support them, blocking the escape route across the Đồng Nai river with gunship and artillery fire, however the VC were able to disengage as night fell. The following day the ARVN located and overran a VC Company. ARVN losses were 51 killed, but they claimed to have killed 167 VC while U.S. forces claimed a further 49.

In a follow-up operation the ARVN engaged another VC force killing 40.

== Aftermath ==
Operation Akron officially concluded on 29 June, PAVN/VC losses were 412 killed, U.S. losses were nine killed and ARVN losses 51 killed.
