= Operation Hop Tac I =

Part of the Vietnam War (1968)

- Part of the Vietnam War
Date	10 February – 10 March 1968
Location	Dinh Tuong Province (now Tiền Giang Province), South Vietnam
Result	U.S. claims operational success

Belligerents
United States	Viet Cong

Commanders and leaders
Col. Harry O. Williams	

Units involved
1st Brigade, 9th Infantry Division; 2nd Battalion, 39th Infantry Regiment; 5th Battalion, 60th Infantry Regiment; 1st Battalion, 84th Artillery Regiment; Company A, 15th Engineer Battalion	263rd Main Force Battalion; 313th Sapper Engineer Company

Casualties and losses
92 killed	US body count: 345 killed

Operation Hop Tac I was a road security operation conducted during the Vietnam War by the U.S. 9th Infantry Division along Route 4 in Dinh Tuong Province, South Vietnam from 10 February to 10 March 1968.

== Background ==
On 10 February, 9th Division commander Major general George G. O'Connor gave the commander of the 1st Brigade, 9th Division, Colonel Harry O. Williams, control of the 2nd Battalion, 39th Infantry Regiment, 5th Battalion, 60th Infantry Regiment, 1st Battalion, 84th Artillery Regiment and Company A, 15th Engineer Battalion to conduct Operation Hop Tac I to secure and repair Route 4 across the length of Dinh Tuong Province.

== Operation ==
The operation proceeded uneventfully for the first week. On the evening of 14 February, three Vietcong (VC) battalions attacked Vĩnh Long and the 1st Brigade was put on alert to assist, however the South Vietnamese forces were able to force the VC out without U.S. assistance.

=== Firebase Jaeger ===
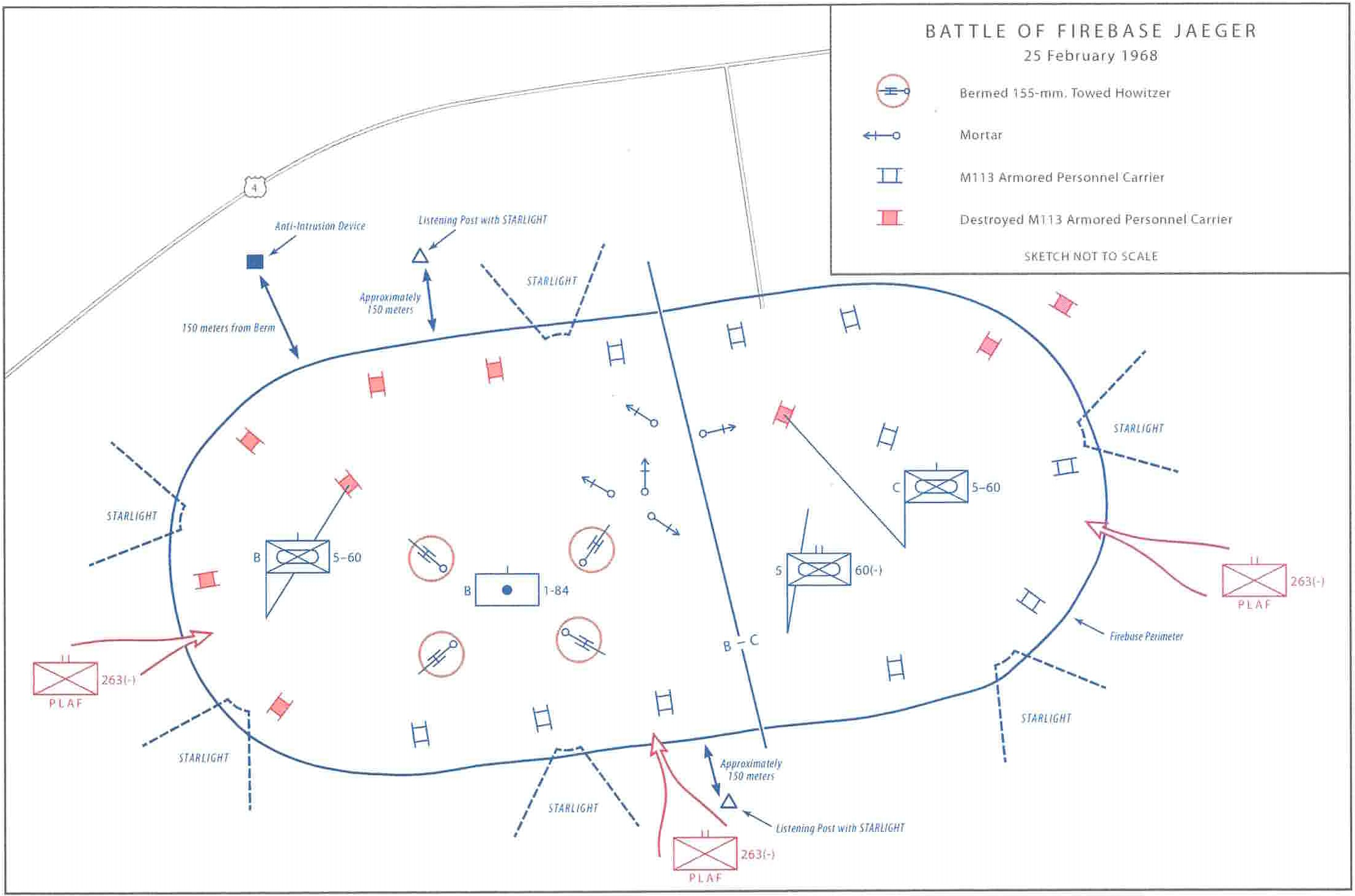
Battle of Firebase Jaeger, 25 February 1968

The 1st Brigade had established Firebase Jaeger (10.395°N 106.276°E) to support the operation approximately 7 km northeast of Đồng Tâm Base Camp. Jaegar was built on dry rice paddy criss-crossed by shallow dikes giving clear observation of the surrounding area. Four 155 mm howitzers of Battery B, 1/84th Artillery were located at Jaegar, together with Companies B and C, 5/60th Infantry, equipped with 25 M113 armored personnel carriers, a 30-man road-building team from Company B, 15th Engineers and a platoon from Company A, 2/39th Infantry. Half of the M113s were spaced at 25-meter intervals around the base perimeter, while the rest were concentrated at the center. Given the hard dried out ground, none of the M113s were dug in and the base was only lightly fortified.

In the early hours of 25 February 3-400 VC 263rd Main Force Battalion and the 313th Sapper Engineer Company approached Jaeger from the south, east, and west. At 01:45 an observation post on the southeast of the base saw VC through a Starlight scope and raised the alarm. Four M113s were sent to investigate the contact and had only just exited the north of the base when they were hit by Rocket-propelled grenades (RPGs) setting the lead M113 on fire. Seconds later, more RPGs were fired at the M113s on the western perimeter setting a further five ablaze. VC sappers then attacked the perimeter wire with satchel charges. Williams called for reinforcements from Firebase Hessian, 3 km to the east and Firebase Fels, 3 km to the west. At 02:45 a VC squad penetrated the artillery battery capturing two of the howitzers. The commander of Company C then called for artillery support from Firebases Hessian and Fels as airbursts directly over Jaeger. The defenders took cover as the artillery barrage temporarily disrupted the VC attack.

A relief force of seven M113s had left Firebase Hessian and despite losing two M113s to RPGs en route, five arrived at Jaeger at 03:00 and began attacking the VC around the perimeter. By 03:15 the VC began retreating. At 03:30 M113s carrying Company A, 2/39th Infantry arrived from Firebase Fels and pursued the VC to the south. At 04:15 Company C 2/39th Infantry, walked in from Firebase Fels and by 05:15 the area had been secured and the engagement was over. 22 Americans had been killed, nine M113s had been destroyed and two howitzers had been damaged. The VC had lost approximately 100 killed.

== Aftermath ==
VC activity in Dinh Tuong Province dropped off noticeably after the battle at Firebase Jaeger. U.S. night ambushes of VC mine-laying teams on Route 4 reduced mine attacks to negligible levels. The operation concluded on 10 March 1968.
