= Rex Clark =

Australian Army officer (1935–1978)

- Born: 14 September 1935; Inverell, NSW, Australia
- Died: 19 October 1978 (aged 43); Canberra, Australia
- Military career
- Allegiance: Australia
- Branch: Royal Australian Engineers; Australian Army
- Service years: 1954–1978
- Rank: Major
- Service number: 242633
- Unit: Australian Army Training Team
- Conflicts: Vietnam War; Dhofar Rebellion
- Awards: OStJ, SM, BS(V), AM(V), JSCM, CG, LSM, AFHM, SSM, TSM
- Other work: Author of military history articles, curator at Australian War Memorial

Rex Clark (14 September 1935 — 19 October 1978) was an officer of the Australian Army and a collector of orders, decorations and medals as well as military history books and ephemera. Clark gained notoriety due to his service as a mercenary in foreign wars while on leave from the Australian Army. He was appointed Officer of the Order of Saint John and received Imperial and Australian awards for Vietnam service and long service. He was awarded a number of foreign awards although during his lifetime such awards were not officially recognised by Australia. He ended his own life while being investigated in relation to the disappearance of militaria from museums and private collections.

== Military service ==
Major Rex Clark served as a member of the Australian Army Training Team in South Vietnam in 1963–1964. In April 1964, during operation Lam Son 115, while one of two Australian observers with Vietnamese Rangers, they found themselves under fire from entrenched Viet Cong around their helicopter landing zone. The Australians switched from observers to leaders, organized two groups from the disorganised rangers and while Clark's group provided supporting fire, the other Australian led his group to attack and clear the enemy. He was assigned to the Army staff in London for two years in 1968 and returned to Vietnam as project officer in the Australian Army Assistance Group Vietnam in 1972. Clark also served secretly while attached to an American unit which was fighting in Cambodia.

The Dhofar Rebellion in Oman that raged between 1962 and 1976 attracted foreign mercenaries to help fight the Marxist guerrillas who were threatening the regime of the British-educated Sultan Qaboos bin Said al-Said. This war attracted soldiers with combat experience, who were recruited into battlefield leadership roles to shore up the Sultan's regime and to help prevent the key oil-exporting Strait of Hormuz from falling under communist control. Attached to the Iranian Brigade as a liaison officer Clark was wounded during a successful bid to save Iranian soldiers caught in a battle during the rebellion.

While on long service leave from the Army in August–September 1978, he fought unofficially with Rhodesian troops against guerrilla forces.

== Decorations and awards ==
Major Rex Clark received the General Service Medal (1962) with clasp South Vietnam, the Vietnam Medal 1964-73 and the South Vietnam Campaign Medal 1964-73 for service in South Vietnam. Some sources claim that he was the most decorated Australian serviceman to serve in South Vietnam. Due to Australian Government policy and military regulations at that time, permission to wear foreign awards for Vietnam service, other than the South Vietnam Campaign Medal 1964-73, were neither approved nor gazetted. He was also controversial for serving as a mercenary in foreign wars while on leave from the Australian Army and where he was awarded a number of foreign awards for bravery.

=== Vietnam War ===
He was awarded the US Soldiers Medal for saving two wounded South Vietnamese soldiers by crawling through a minefield, and the South Vietnamese Life Saving Medal for rescuing a young girl who was drowning in Da Nang harbour.

Major Clark received the following US and South Vietnamese awards for his Vietnam War service:

- Soldiers Medal (US)
- Bronze Star Medal for Valour (Four Awards) (US)
- Bronze Star Medal for Service (US)
- Air Medal for Valour (Three Awards) (US)
- Air Medal for Service. (US)
- Joint Services Commendation Medal (US)
- Cross of Gallantry with Gold Star (Republic of Vietnam)
- Life Saving Medal (Republic of Vietnam)
- Armed Forces Honor Medal 1st Class (Republic of Vietnam)
- Staff Service Medal (Republic of Vietnam)
- Technical Service Medal (Republic of Vietnam)
- Meritorious Unit Commendation (US).
- Cross of Gallantry with Palm Unit Citation (Republic of Vietnam)

=== Dhofar Rebellion ===
While on leave from the Australian Army in 1975, he joined the Sultan of Oman's Armed Forces to fight as a mercenary against Marxist insurgents from South Yemen during the Dhofar Rebellion. While serving as a mercenary in Oman, Major Rex Clark was awarded the Sultan's Gallantry Medal (Oman) — Oman's highest military award. Clark infuriated the Australian Defence Forces by joining the army of pre-revolutionary Iran, an Omani ally, while on leave in 1975. He was awarded the Iranian Gold Medal for Valor — Iran's highest award and the only foreigner to win the award, for saving Iranian soldiers caught in a battle during the Dhofar Rebellion.

=== Other awards ===
In 1972, Major Clark was appointed as a serving brother of The Most Venerable Order of the Hospital of Saint John of Jerusalem (Order of Saint John) for services to St. John Ambulance brigade. In 1974, he was gazetted as an Officer Brother of the Order of St John.

== Military history publications ==
Major Rex Clark contributed to a number of military history publications including Sabretache, The Journal of the Military Historical Society of Australia, and articles in the Australian Dictionary of Biography.

== Militaria collections scandal ==
Major Rex Clark was an established authority on militaria and possessed an extensive collection. In 1967 his expertise was cited in a case of counterfeit medals being sold in militaria shops in Sydney. It was claimed that he possessed the world's largest collection of military medals awarded to Australians.

In the 1970s Clark was working at the Australian War Memorial in Canberra as one of the unofficial army historians connected with the museum due to his knowledge of military history and also due to his connections with military museums overseas. Certain militaria from these museums were found to be missing or replaced by copies, and Clarks was believed to be the only person who had accessed them during his visits. During this time, the medals of the Australian war hero Harold Elliott, were discovered to be missing from the Australian War Memorial. These were never recovered.

In April 1974, Clark was arrested by Australian Commonwealth Police in Canberra on a warrant for extradition to Britain. The extradition warrant said that Clark was accused of "conspiracy to steal, stealing, receiving stolen goods and bribery in the United Kingdom". The charges involved more than A$12,000 in goods. The application for extradition was dismissed in May 1974 due to lack of evidence.

Following an investigation in the disappearance of rare military relics and medals from collections and museums around the world, in 1978 Australian Commonwealth Police discovered duplicate military medals in Sydney and also recovered the original tunics of Sir John Monash and Sir Thomas Blamey, stolen from the Australian War Memorial in Canberra. Clark was implicated in their theft and was believed to have duplicated medals after borrowing them from collectors. He was suspected of keeping the originals and returning copies to the unsuspecting collectors.

Clark was found dead with a self-inflicted gunshot wound to the head at his home in the Canberra suburb of Page, while still being under investigation.
