= George G. O'Connor =

United States Army general

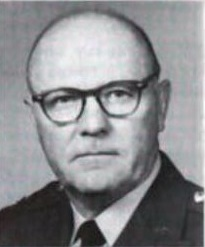
- Born: August 24, 1914; Pasadena, California, US
- Died: March 24, 1971 (aged 56); San Antonio, Texas, US
- Burial place: West Point Cemetery
- Military career
- Allegiance: United States
- Branch: United States Army
- Service years: 1933–1971
- Rank: Lieutenant General
- Commands: Fourth United States Army; VII Corps; 9th Infantry Division; 36th Field Artillery Group; 53d Field Artillery Battalion
- Conflicts: World War II: Battle of Lone Tree Hill; Battle of Luzon; Vietnam War: Operation Attleboro; Operation Coronado II; Operation Coronado IV; Operation Akron; Operation Santa Fe; Operation Hop Tac I
- Awards: Army Distinguished Service Medal; Silver Star (3); Legion of Merit; Distinguished Flying Cross; Bronze Star Medal

George Gray O'Connor (August 24, 1914 – March 24, 1971) was a United States Army lieutenant general who served as commander of the 9th Infantry Division during the Vietnam War and then as commander of VII Corps in West Germany and the Fourth United States Army.

O'Connor began his army career as an enlisted man, but later received an appointment to the United States Military Academy at West Point, New York, and graduated with the Class of 1938. He rose through the ranks and distinguished himself several times as Field Artillery battalion commander and later as 6th Infantry Division Artillery Commander during World War II.

== Early life and education ==
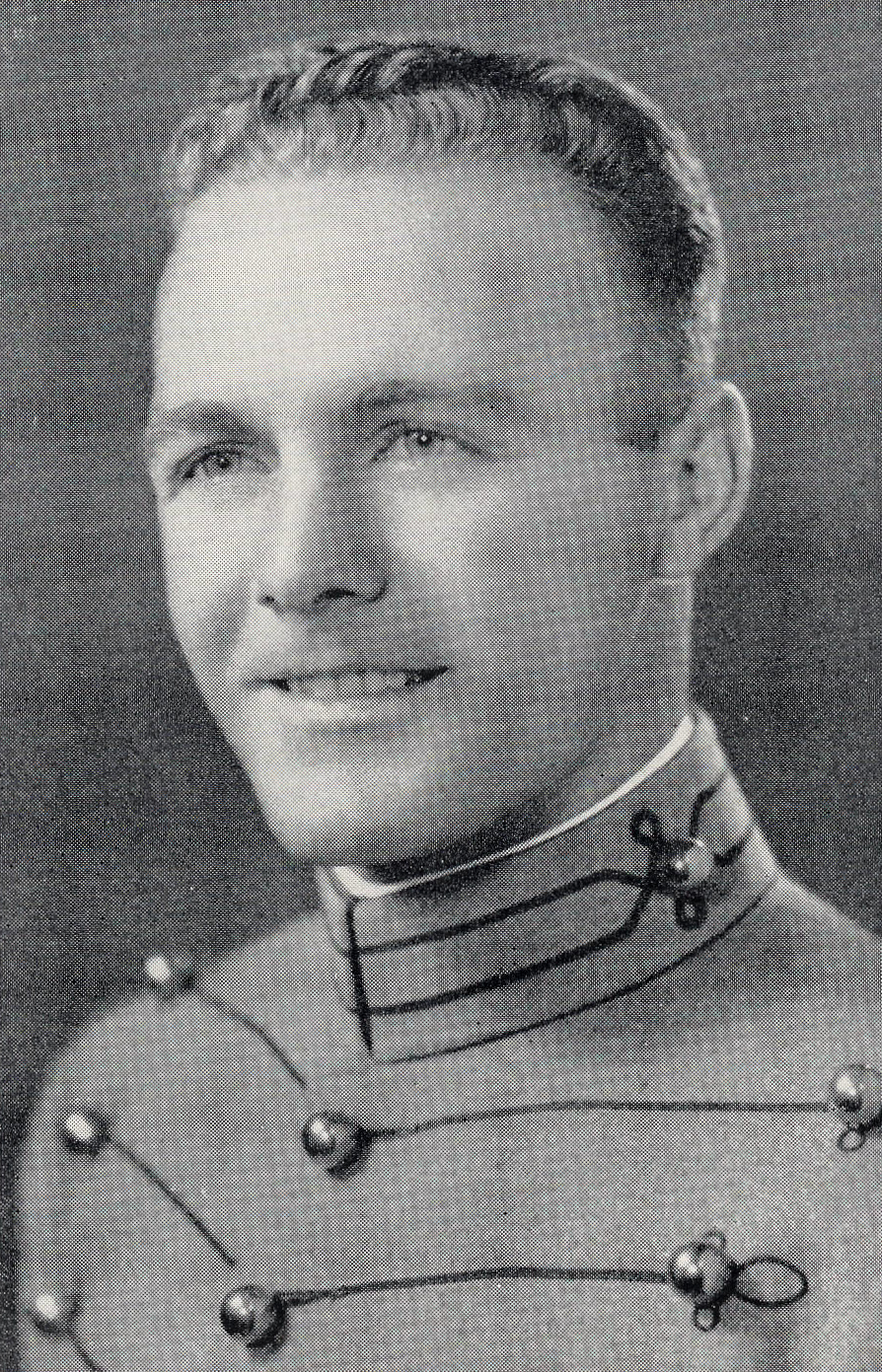
O'Connor as a United States Military Academy cadet c. 1938

O'Connor spent two years at the University of California, before enlisting in the United States Army in 1933. He won a competitive appointment to West Point and entered as a member of the Class of 1938. He graduated with Bachelor of Science degree and was commissioned as a second lieutenant in the Field Artillery Branch and assigned to the 1st Field Artillery Regiment at Fort Sill, Oklahoma.

== Military service ==
=== World War II ===
In mid-1942, O'Connor was appointed commander of a battery of the 53rd Field Artillery Battalion, 6th Infantry Division. In 1943 the 6th Infantry Division deployed to the Pacific Theatre and he later assumed command of the 53rd Battalion. He was awarded the Bronze Star Medal for his actions at the Battle of Lone Tree Hill in June 1944.

During the Battle of Luzon, O'Connor was awarded the Silver Star for his actions at Muñoz where he deployed and personally directed the fire of the howitzers to repel a Japanese tank attack. Under heavy fire, he rallied and reorganized the survivors of a crew whose piece had received a direct hit. By the end of the war he had been promoted to colonel and served as the 6th Division Artillery commander. For his service in this capacity, O'Connor was decorated with Legion of Merit.

=== Interbellum ===
The 6th Division served occupation duty in southern Korea. In mid-1946, O'Connor left Korea and from then until 1950 served at West Point.

In 1951, O'Connor graduated from the Command and General Staff College and was then assigned as Chief, War History Division, Office Chief of Military History. He attended the Army War College from 1954 to 1955 and on graduation was appointed Chief of Staff of the Communications Zone, United States Army Europe and then as commander of the 36th Field Artillery Group, Babenhausen Kaserne, West Germany from 1 February 1957 to 19 May 1958.

O'Connor then served at The Pentagon as Chief, War Plans Division, Army General Staff and then Deputy Director for Strategic Planning. In 1960 he was appointed Executive Officer of the Plans Directorate, Joint Chiefs of Staff. In 1962, O'Connor returned to South Korea as Deputy Chief of Staff, United Nations Command.

In September 1964, O'Connor joined the 4th Infantry Division at Fort Lewis, Washington.

=== Vietnam War ===
When the 4th Infantry Division deployed to Vietnam in late 1966, O'Connor was serving as Assistant Division Commander.

In October 1966, O'Connor became assistant division commander of the 25th Infantry Division. In June 1967, he assumed command of the 9th Infantry Division. During his time in command of the 9th Infantry Division, O'Connor led his command in the U.S. response to the Tet Offensive.

For his service in Vietnam, O'Connor was decorated with the Army Distinguished Service Medal, another two Silver Stars and a Distinguished Flying Cross.

=== Post-war ===
On his return from Vietnam in early 1968, O'Connor was assigned as Deputy Chief of Staff for Individual Training, Continental Army Command. In September 1969, he was designated commander of VII Corps in West Germany and promoted to lieutenant general. He served in this role from October 1969 to February 1971.

On 1 March 1971, O'Connor assumed command of the Fourth United States Army at Fort Sam Houston, Texas. On 24 March 1971, he died from a massive heart attack and was buried at the West Point Cemetery.

== Personal life ==
O'Connor married Hope Brown in 1938 and they had two sons.
