= Andrew Lam =

American writer and journalist (born 1964)

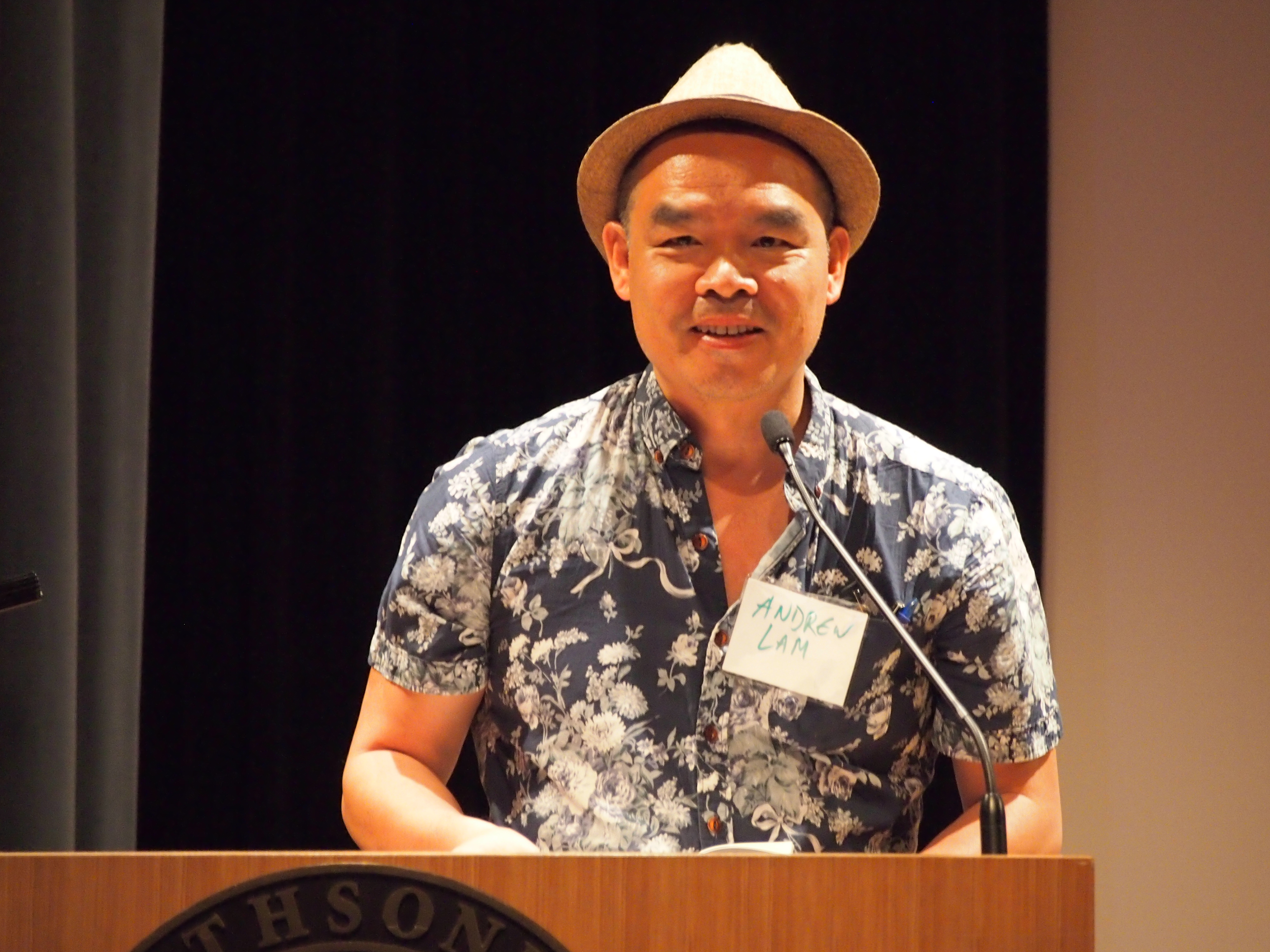
- Lam reading in 2017
- Born: Lâm Quang Dũng; 1964 (age 61–62); South Vietnam
- Education: University of California, Berkeley (BA); San Francisco State University (MA)
- Occupations: Writer and journalist
- Relatives: Lam Quang Thi (father)

Andrew Lam (born 1964) is a Vietnamese American author and journalist who has written about the Overseas Vietnamese experience.

== Biography ==
Andrew Lam was born Lâm Quang Dũng in 1964 in South Vietnam. He was the son of General Lâm Quang Thi of the Army of the Republic of Vietnam. He attended Lycée Yersin in Đà Lạt.

Lam left Vietnam with his family during the fall of Saigon in April 1975. He attended the University of California, Berkeley, where he majored in biochemistry. He soon abandoned plans for medical school and entered a creative writing program at San Francisco State University. While still in school he began writing for Pacific News Service and in 1993 won the Outstanding Young Journalist Award from the Society of Professional Journalists.

A PBS documentary produced by WETA in 2004, My Journey Home, told 3 stories of Americans returning to their ancestral homelands, including of Lam's return to Vietnam.

He is currently the web editor of New America Media. He is also a journalist and short story writer. In 2005, he published a collection of essays, Perfume Dreams, about the problem of identity as a Vietnamese living in the U.S. Lam received the PEN/Beyond Margins Award in 2006 for Perfume Dreams: Reflections on the Vietnamese Diaspora. He is a regular contributor to National Public Radio's All Things Considered. His second book, East Eats West: Writing in Two Hemispheres is a meditation on east–west relations, and how Asian immigration changed the West. It was named Top Ten Indies by Shelf Unbound Magazine in 2010.

Birds of Paradise Lost, his third book, is a collection of short stories about Vietnamese newcomers struggling to remake their lives in the San Francisco Bay after a long, painful exodus from Vietnam.

Lam blogs regularly on Huffington Post.

He was a John S. Knight Journalism Fellow at Stanford University 2001–2002.

Though reticent about speaking about his sexuality, in 2009 Lam gave an interview for a collection of portraits of homosexual Americans.

== Publications ==
Books

- Perfume Dreams: Reflections on the Vietnamese Diaspora, (Heyday Books, 2005)
- East Eats West: Writing in Two Hemispheres, (Heyday Books, 2010)
- Birds of Paradise Lost, (Red Hen Press, 2013)
- Stories from the Edge of the Sea, (Red Hen Press, 2025)

Essays

- "Letter to a Vietnamese cousin: Should you come to America?", December 22, 2002
- "Andrew Lam's essays on New America Media"
- "Andrew Lam's essays on Huffington Post"

Fiction

- "Slingshot" in Zyzzyva, winter 1998, available online

Short Stories "Show and Tell"

- "Letter to a young refugee from another", April 6, 1999

== Quotes ==
- "Art is the lesser sister to medicine. It aims to heal."
