= The Horseshoe (Vietnam) =

Extinct Volcano in Vietnam

- Phuoc Tuy Province, South Vietnam
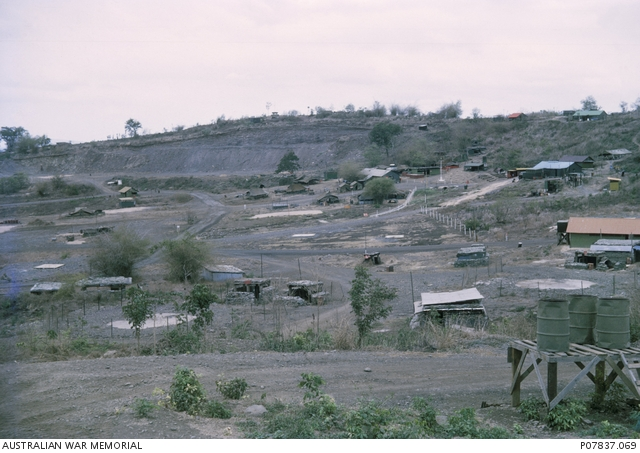
- Inside the Horseshoe in September 1970

Site information
- Condition: abandoned

Location
- Coordinates: 10.508°N 107.273°E

Site history
- Built: 1967
- In use: 1967–1971
- Battles/wars: Vietnam War

Garrison information
- Occupants: 1st Australian Task Force

The Horseshoe (also known as Fire Support Base Horseshoe, Horseshoe Hill or Hill 82), is an extinct volcano that was used by the 1st Australian Task Force (1ATF) as a military base during the Vietnam War.

== Geography ==
The Horseshoe is located approximately 9 km southeast of Nui Dat, 1 km north of Đất Đỏ and immediately east of Route TI 52 in Phuoc Tuy Province. The Horseshoe is an extinct volcano with its crescent-shaped remaining walls (giving its Horseshoe shape) rising up to 100 feet (30 m) above the surrounding plains, while the southern end is open.

== History ==
The base was first established by the 5th Battalion, Royal Australian Regiment who air-assaulted into the area on 6 March 1967 in Operation Leeton. Occupation of the Horseshoe as a fire support base would allow artillery coverage of areas beyond the range of guns at Nui Dat and allow for patrols of the surrounding area.

The Horseshoe was at the north end of the 11 km barrier minefield that ran to Lo Gom on the coast and was intended to stop Vietcong (VC) infiltration from their bases in the northern hills to the populated coastal villages. On 16 March 1967 Australian sappers began constructing two parallel barbed-wire fences 70-100m apart that would enclose the minefield. On 1 May the sappers began laying M16 mines and after a month had laid more than 22,000 M16s for the loss of five Australians killed. The minefield was a failure with many of the mines stolen by the VC and reused against the Australians. In 1968 1ATF began removing the minefield.

The rocky terrain within the Horseshoe made digging almost impossible and trenches and bunkers had to be blasted out and sandbags were filled with rocks. The temperature was cooler than Nui Dat particularly at night and a well provided ample water.

The Horseshoe was usually garrisoned by one infantry company and one artillery battery which would each be rotated between here and Nui Dat. From 27 May to 3 July 1967 the Horseshoe was entirely a New Zealand base with V Company, Royal New Zealand Infantry Regiment and a company of 161 Battery, Royal Regiment of New Zealand Artillery based there.

From July to December 1969 the base was used to train units from the Army of the Republic of Vietnam (ARVN) 18th Division in small arms handling and small unit tactics. The ARVN were described by the 1ATF deputy commander as "the worst battalion in the worst regiment in the worst division in the world." After training the ARVN units, mixed platoons would then mount patrol operations in the Horseshoe tactical area of responsibility.

The base was handed over to the ARVN in June 1971.
