= Life Saving Medal =

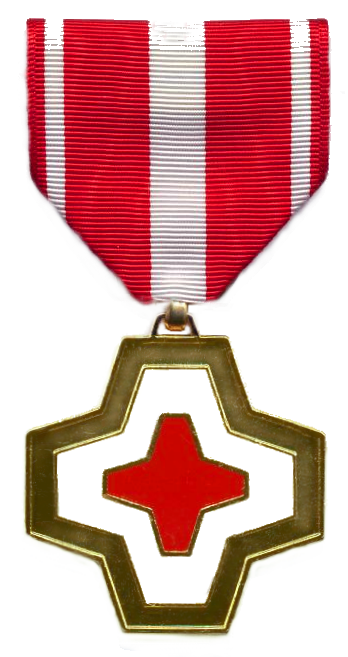
- Life Saving Medal
- Type: Single class medal
- Awarded for: Military and civilians "who exhibited extreme bravery in risking their lives to rescue other people in distress".
- Presented by: Republic of Vietnam (South Vietnam)
- Eligibility: Military and civilians in South Vietnam between 1961 and 1973
- Campaign: Vietnam War
- Status: No longer awarded
- Established: 1964
- Ribbon bar of the Lifesaving Medal

Precedence
- Next (higher): Hazardous Service Medal
- Next (lower): Loyalty Medal

The Life Saving Medal (Vietnamese: Nhân-Dũng Bội-Tinh) was a medal awarded by the Republic of Vietnam (South Vietnam) during the years of the Vietnam War.

It was awarded, or posthumously awarded, to military personnel of all grades, government officials and civilians who exhibited extreme bravery in risking their lives to rescue other people in distress. The Life Saving Medal was also intended for foreigners who risked their lives to rescue Vietnamese citizens in distress. An example of this was the awarding of the Life Saving Medal to Major Rex Clark, an Australian Army officer, for rescuing a young girl who was drowning in Da Nang harbour.

The Life Saving Medal had only one class and was awarded by authority of the Chief of Joint General Staff of the Republic of Vietnam Armed Forces, and presented by the President of the Republic of Vietnam.

Australians who received this award were allowed to wear it in uniform.

== See also ==
- Military awards and decorations of South Vietnam
- Lifesaving Medal (USA)
- Lifesaving Awards
