= Vietnamese National Military Academy =

Military academy of the State of Vietnam and South Vietnam

National Military Academy
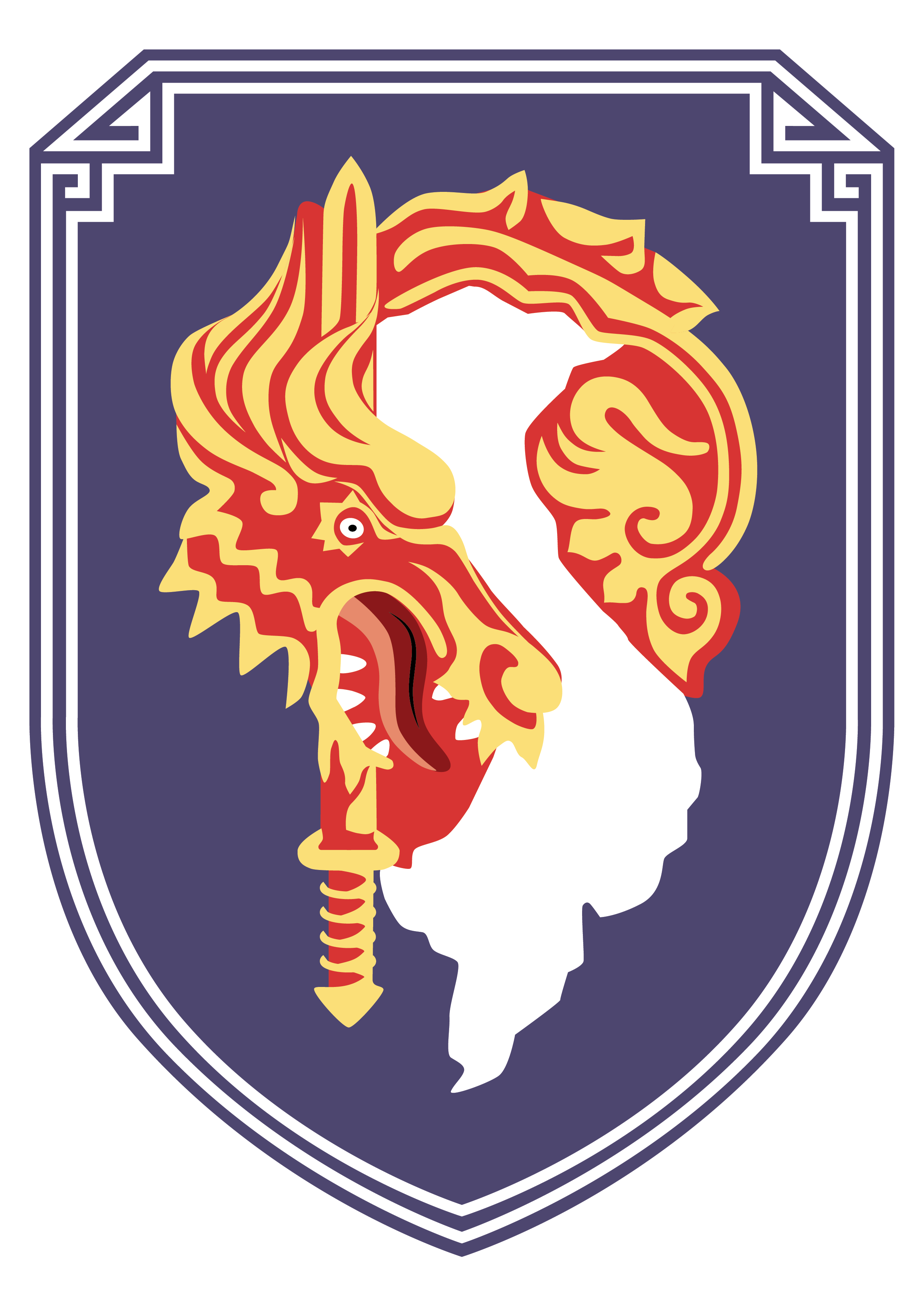
- Active: 1936–March 1975 – superseded by the Vietnam Military Academy
- Location: Da Lat, South Vietnam; 11.966°N 108.469°E

The National Military Academy or Dalat Military Academy was the main military school of the State of Vietnam and Republic of Vietnam.

== History ==
=== French Indochina and State of Vietnam ===
The Dalat School of the Eurasian Servicemen's Children (Ecole des Enfants de Troupe Eurasiens de Dalat, EETED) was established in 1936, modelled on a similar school in Autun, France. The school was dissolved during the Japanese occupation in 1944. The school was reestablished as the Dalat School for Children of Soldiers (Ecole des Enfants de Troupe de Dalat) in 1950.

The Vietnamese National Military Academy was founded in December 1948 in Huế. Under French operation, the academy was simply a nine-month officer training school designed to produce infantry platoon leaders. In 1950 it moved to Dalat because of better local weather and remained under French operation until after the signing of the Geneva Accords in 1954, when the Vietnamese assumed control.

On 20 April 1952, the academy celebrated its first promotion (Hoàng Diệu) with a "baptism" in the Saint Cyr fashion. Celebrating officials included Chief of State, Emperor Bảo Đại, Prime Minister Trần Văn Hữu, the Governor-general of French Indochina and general Raoul Salan, commander of the French Far East Expeditionary Corps. The Emperor awarded the Hoàng Diệu promotions to senior and junior classes with a Saint-Cyr styled saber as new officers of the armed forces. As a symbol of the handover of self-defense responsibility of the whole Vietnam to the Vietnamese National Army, the senior class fired four traditional arrows in each direction (the arrows being a symbol of the old days of imperial Vietnam and its armed forces).

=== South Vietnam ===
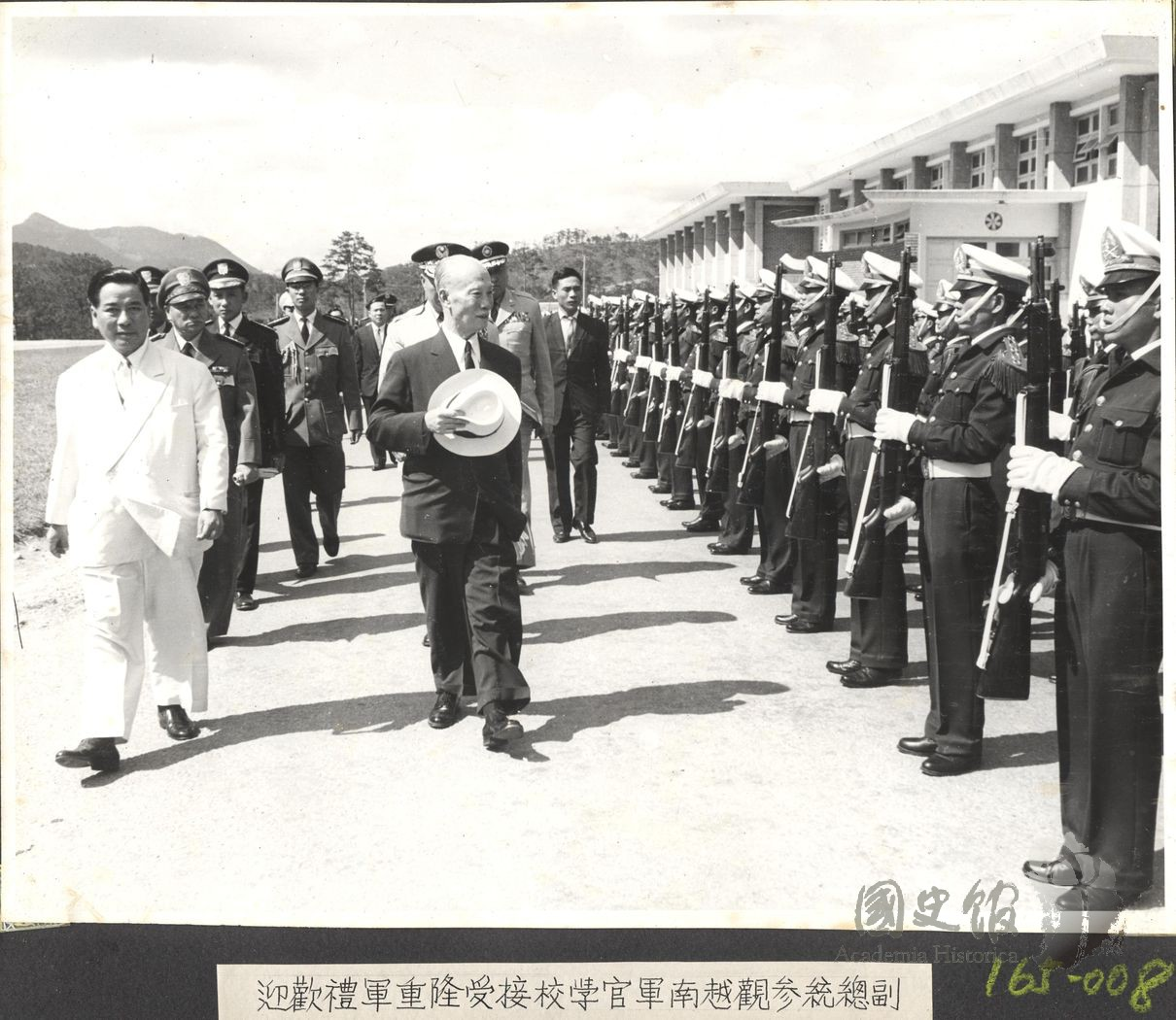
President Ngo Dinh Diem and Taiwanese premier Chen Cheng inspect cadets in March 1963

In 1955 the United States advisory effort began and the curriculum was extended to one year and in 1956 to two years.

In October 1956 with the United States taking over the training of South Vietnamese military forces Military Assistance Advisory Group Vietnam personnel participated with key Vietnamese officers on a master school planning board. The board gathered factual information on all schools as a basis for developing a master plan and directed key changes in organizations and location. The Military Academy at Dalat, with a two-year curriculum combining academic and military subjects to train new officers, would be transformed later into a four-year institution.

The academy awarded graduates a regular commission and the rank of second Lieutenant, with a ten-year active duty obligation, but produced less than 200 new officers each year.

In 1959 President Ngo Dinh Diem first declared the academy to be a full four-year, degree-granting, university-level institution. Expansion planning and construction began, but the program floundered because of the conflicting short-term demand for junior officers and lack of a qualified academic faculty. As a result, the academy graduated three three year classes. but no four-year classes and, in 1963, reverted to the production of enlightened platoon leaders with two years of training. The concept was similar to U.S. officer candidate schools throughout 1965.

In September 1966 COMUSMACV General William Westmoreland directed General John F. Freund to examine the ARVN officer training program of the academy, believing it should reflect a leadership philosophy stressing "the obligation and responsibility of the graduates to the country as opposed to self-interest." " Freund's investigation was devastating. He found the existing two-year program "simply an enriched OCS [Officer Candidate School] course" and a planned four-year curriculum heavily weighted toward science and engineering, but weak in leadership, social sciences, humanities, political warfare, and military science. The quality of the South Vietnamese instructors was poor, the instruction worse, and learning minimal. Students were graded on a curve so that most passed, which explained the low attrition rate of 3-4 percent. According to the American advisers at the academy, the commandant, Brigadier general Lâm Quang Thơ, was one of the least effective ARVN general officers. Freund recommended hiring competent civilian instructors, establishing academic departments, and planning a 30-percent failure rate for the projected four-year curriculum. Westmoreland passed the findings to Joint General Staff (JGS) chairman General Cao Văn Viên in November, with the hope that the JGS might adopt them in 1967.

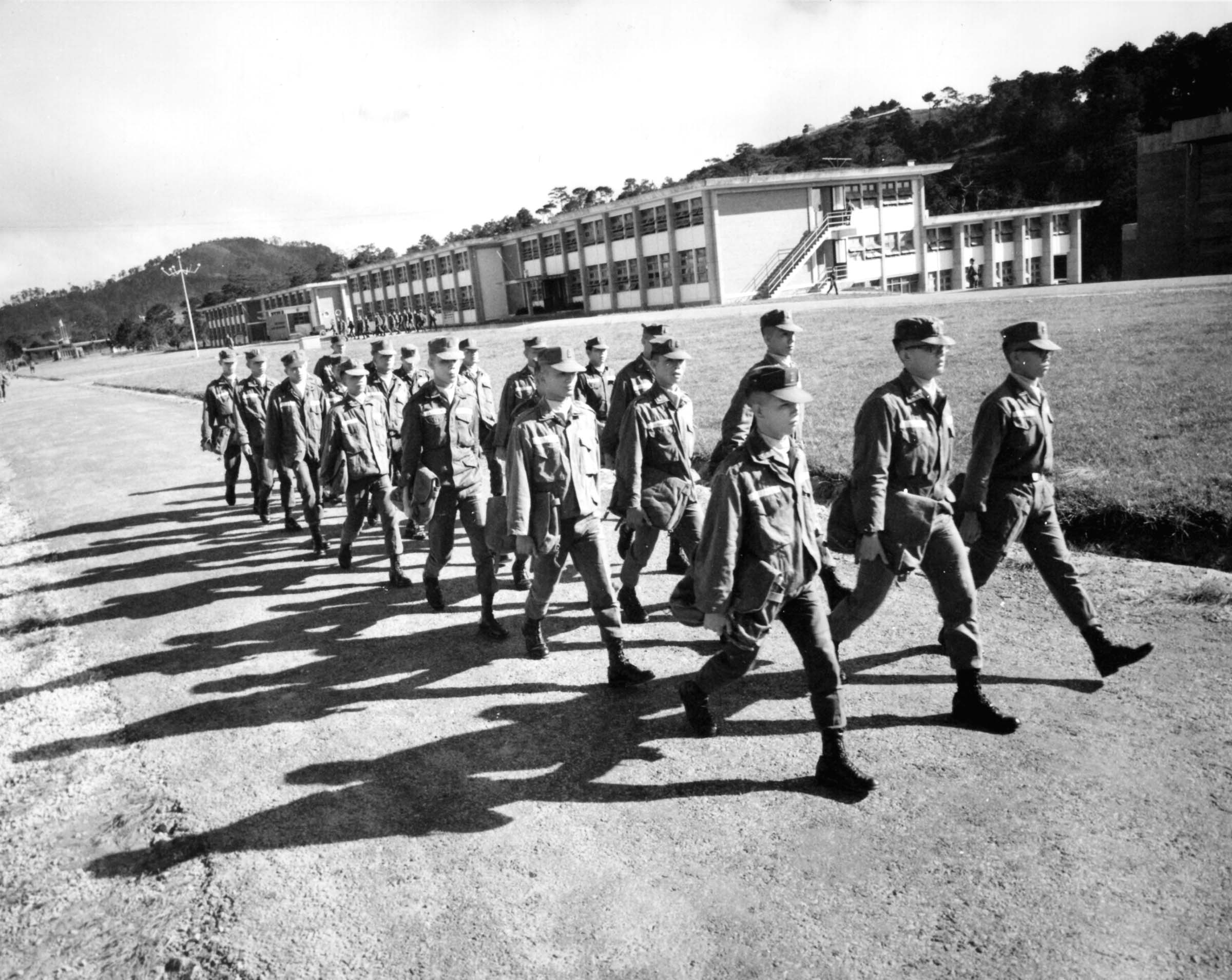
Cadets at the academy

On 13 December 1966, Premier Nguyễn Cao Kỳ signed a decree permanently converting the academy from a two year to a four year institution. Classroom instruction and curriculums were to be patterned after West Point. Viên initially opposed the curriculum which featured electrical and mechanical engineering and the social sciences and recommended one which emphasized electrical engineering with a lower priority given to mechanical and civil engineering. The superintendent, the academic dean and the US advisers at the academy opposed this view and the school adopted a compromise curriculum.

On 13 February 1967 at the start of the academic year, the senior class split into two classes: one moved into the four year curriculum, the other remaining with the two year program. Before 1967 cadets had been graded only semiannually in academic studies and classes were based largely on lectures with a minimum of outside study. Beginning in February cadets were graded daily in mathematics and physical sciences and graded weekly in social sciences. The academic dean had a master's degree from the US Naval Postgraduate School and believed strongly in the study and teaching methods used at West Point. Grades were posted weekly and the first resectioning, based on academic standing, occurred on 1 April and continued every six weeks thereafter. Written partial exams were given biweekly or monthly and written general exams were given in June and November. Lectures the former mainstay were frowned upon and cadets were required to study three hours a night after an average of five hours' instruction daily.

US officer advisor strength was increased from six to 13 to furnish a well-qualified advisor to each of the eight academic departments. Advisory efforts were geared toward improving the quality of entering cadets, obtaining a better qualified staff and faculty, developing a balanced curriculum and supporting the academy's physical expansion. Westmoreland strongly supported the academy noting in a letter to Viên that: "Continued development of the VNMA is one of the most important programs currently in progress to provide for the future of the Republic of Vietnam. I feel that it should be given high priority and continued command interest and emphasis."

The academy limited each class to 250 students. American funds to support the academy's expansion totaled about $8 million.

The four-year curriculum was diverse, besides military subjects and courses in mathematics, physics, history, English, law, philosophy, chemistry, engineering and surveying (50 percent of the academic program was devoted to engineering sciences), the curriculum furnished courses to help solve some of South Vietnam's unique problems. For example, a course in hamlet planning covered everything from where to put the village chief's house to how to drill wells for water; another course conducted in sanitary engineering was designed to improve the sanitation in hamlets and villages.

Subjects were taught by the academy's all South Vietnamese military faculty of approximately 100 instructors. Classes were held as seminars with small groups of cadets. All cadets had their own textbooks which was something rare in civilian Vietnamese universities. Although the curriculum was patterned after the U.S. service academies, the cadets were exposed to more classroom hours than the cadets at West Point, however, both participated in the same amount of athletic activity.

An academy applicant had to be a citizen between the ages of 18 and 22, unmarried and a high school graduate. Appointment to the academy was based upon the results of a two-day competitive academic examination and a complete physical examination. The more highly qualified students obtained from this competition provided a basis for developing the potential of an "elite" professional corps. Approximately one out of ten applicants were accepted. In 1968, for example, out of more than 2,500 applicants only 270 were accepted in the four-year program. The attrition rate was minimal since the academy's conversion to a four-year college, averaging from 4 to 5 percent (the approximate average rate for West Point was 30 percent). At the beginning of 1969, the academy had an enrollment of 900 cadets with plans to expand the enrolment to 1,000 by the end of the year.

In December 1969, the academy graduated the first class of 92 cadets to graduate from its four-year program. The event set the stage for a crucial test of one of the most ambitious plans of Vietnamization to date. During the pass-in-review graduation ceremony the long-range importance of the academy graduates was emphasized by the presence of President Nguyễn Văn Thiệu and a host of top political and military leaders. In his remarks Thiệu told them "they must be more than military leaders" and urged the graduates to be in the forefront of a nation-building generation. On graduation the cadets were assigned to the three services as follows: Army 77, Air Force 10, Navy/Marine Corps 5.

By 1970 the physical plant consisted of ten buildings including four cadet dormitories, three academic buildings, an academy headquarters, a cadet mess hall and a cadet club. Under construction were faculty quarters, a fourth academic building, a library and a cadet regimental headquarters.

During 1970 a cadet in his second year at the academy became the first Vietnamese to be accepted for entrance to West Point.

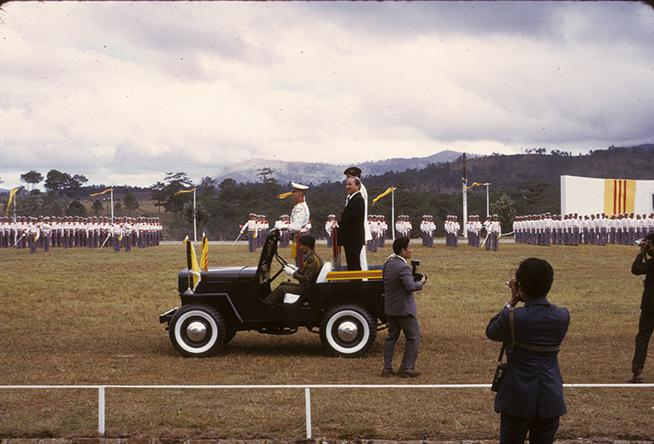
President Nguyễn Văn Thiệu inspects the graduating class in January 1975

In late March 1975 as the People's Army of Vietnam (PAVN) 1975 spring offensive overran large swathes of South Vietnam, Commandant Major general Lâm Quang Thơ was ordered to defend Dalat. However seeing that the area was almost surrounded and knowing that the cadets would be needed to rebuild the shattered ARVN, Thơ instead secured Route 11 to Phan Rang and on the night of 31 March all cadets and instructors were loaded onto trucks and driven to Phan Rang, arriving the next morning. With only disorganised Regional Forces left to defend the city, it was captured with minimal resistance by the PAVN 812th Regiment on 3 April.

=== Current use ===
In late 1975 the site was superseded by the Vietnam Military Academy which moved there from Hanoi.

== List of Commandants ==
- Lieutenant colonel Nguyễn Văn Chuân (1954–1955)
- Lieutenant colonel Nguyễn Văn Thiệu (1955–1957)
- Lieutenant colonel Ho Van To (1957–1958)
- Lieutenant colonel Nguyễn Văn Thiệu (1958–1959)
- Brigadier general Lê Văn Kim (1959–1960)
- Lieutenant colonel Tran Ngoc Huyen (1960–1964)
- Colonel Nguyen Van Kiem (1964–1965)
- Brigadier general Lâm Quang Thơ (1965–1966)
- Colonel Do Ngoc Nhan (1966–1968)
- Major general Lâm Quang Thi (1968–1972)
- Major general Lâm Quang Thơ (1972–1975)
