= Lâm Quang Thi =

South Vietnamese commander (1932–2021)

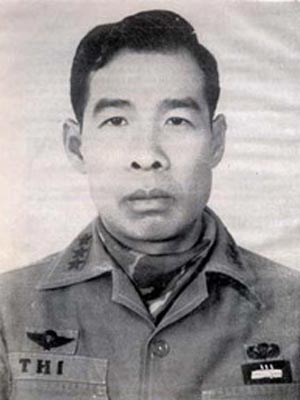
- Born: 7 May 1932; Bạc Liêu, French Indochina
- Died: 19 January 2021 (aged 88); Fremont, California, United States
- Military career
- Allegiance: South Vietnam
- Branch: Army of the Republic of Vietnam
- Service years: 1950–1975
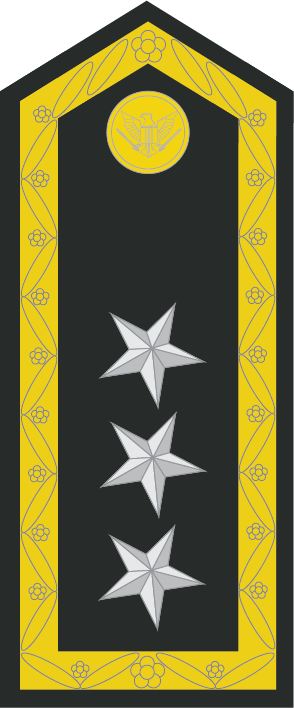
- Rank: Lieutenant General
- Commands: 9th Infantry Division; Vietnamese National Military Academy; I Corps
- Conflicts: First Indochina War; Vietnam War

Lâm Quang Thi (7 May 1932 – 19 January 2021) was a Lieutenant general in the Army of the Republic of Vietnam during the Vietnam War.

== Early life and family ==
Thi was born in Bac Lieu on 7 May 1932, to a family of wealthy landowning farmers. Thi's parents met through a matchmaker and married two years before he was born. Thi's father came from a family of Cao Dai adherents while his mother was a Roman Catholic. His maternal grandfather was one of the richest Chinese landowners in Bac Lieu at the turn of the 20th century. His parents separated in 1937 after their fourth child was born, and his mother took their four children back down to her hometown in Tam Vu. After completing his primary education there, Thi was sent to Can Tho for his secondary education, where he enrolled into the Phan Thanh Gian College after passing through its tough entrance examinations.

== Military service ==
He joined the Vietnamese National Army in 1950 and graduated from the National Military Academy, in Da Lat. He held the positions of Commander of the RVNAF Artillery Training Center, Commander of the Artillery in I Corps, Deputy Commander, RVNAF Artillery; Commander, 9th Infantry Division; and Commander of the Vietnamese National Military Academy.

On 10 March 1972, he replaced Nguyễn Văn Hiếu as deputy commander of I Corps.

== Post-war life ==
Lam fled with his family to the United States in May 1975, when South Vietnam fell to the invading North Vietnamese army. He lived in Fremont, California. Lam earned a French Baccalaureate Degree in Philosophy and an MBA, both from Golden Gate University in San Francisco. His son, Andrew Lam, is a writer and a journalist.

Lam was interviewed about the war in Ken Burns's series The Vietnam War.

== Death ==
Lâm died from COVID-19 in Fremont, California, on 19 January 2021, aged 88, during the COVID-19 pandemic in California.

== Awards and decorations ==
=== National Honours ===
- Commander of the National Order of Vietnam
- Army Distinguished Service Order, First Class
- Navy Distinguished Service Order, First Class
- Gallantry Cross
- Armed Forces Honor Medal, First Class
- Staff Service Medal, First Class
- Technical Service Medal, First Class
- Training Service Medal, First Class
- Civil Action Medal, First Class
- Chuong My Medal, First Class
- Administrative Service Medal, First Class

=== Foreign Honours ===
- South Korea :
  - Order of Military Merit, Chung Mu Medal
- USA :
  - Officer of the Legion of Merit

== Bibliography ==
- Lam, Quang Thi, The Twenty-Five Year Century: A South Vietnamese General Remembers the Indochina War to the Fall of Saigon, University of North Texas Press, 2001, ISBN 1-57441-143-8
- Lam, Quang Thi, Hell in An Loc: The 1972 Easter Invasion and the Battle That Saved South Viet Nam, University of North Texas Press, 2011, ISBN 1-57441-313-9
