= Loyalty Medal =

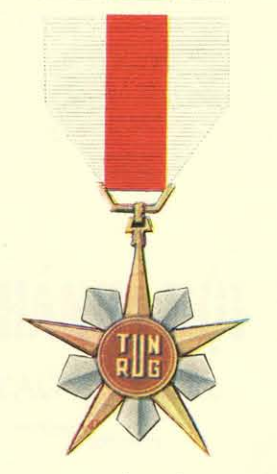
- Loyalty Medal
- Type: Single-grade decoration
- Awarded for: Proven loyalty to the national cause by denouncing and countering enemy subversive activities
- Presented by: South Vietnam
- Eligibility: Vietnamese citizens
- Status: No longer awarded
- Established: 1964

Highlights
- Total awarded posthumously: Yes
- Ribbon bar of the Loyalty Medal

Precedence
- Next (higher): Life Saving Medal (Vietnam)
- Next (lower): Wound Medal

The Loyalty Medal (Vietnamese: Trung-Chánh Bội-Tinh) was a single-grade decoration awarded by South Vietnam. Established in 1964, the medal was awarded to South Vietnamese citizens by the Chief of the Joint General Staff, Republic of Vietnam Military Forces. The medal could be awarded posthumously.

== Criteria ==
The Loyalty Medal was awarded to Vietnamese citizens who had shown proven loyalty to the "National Cause" by denouncing or working to counter, what were deemed by the South Vietnamese government to be, subversive activities that were disruptive to security and order.

== See also ==
- Orders, decorations, and medals of South Vietnam
