= May Tao Secret Zone =

The May Tao Secret Zone was located in the Mây Tào Mountains of South Vietnam, a heavily forested area located at the intersection of Long Khánh, Phước Tuy and Bình Tuy Provinces, that served as a Viet Cong (VC) divisional sanctuary. The zone was the location of the headquarters for the VC 5th Division and 275th Regiment.

It was the site of numerous U.S., and Australia and New Zealand military operations during the Vietnam War.
