= Military decorations of the Cold War =

Between 1947 and 1991, during the years of the Cold War, a large number of military awards and decorations were created by various nations to recognize the undeclared hostilities of the era. Military medals of the Vietnam War and the Korean War are among the best known decorations of the Cold-War era due to the large scale and duration of the conflicts.

The following is a list of military decorations of the Cold War based on the various time periods and specific nations involved.

== Americas ==
=== Canada ===
Korea Medal
Canadian Volunteer Service Medal for Korea
Special Service Medal

=== United States ===
Federal Service Medals
Armed Forces Expeditionary Medal
Korea Defense Service Medal
Korean Service Medal
Medal for Humane Action
National Defense Service Medal
Vietnam Service Medal
Unofficial
Cold War Victory Medal The Cold War Victory Medal is both an official medal of the U.S. National Guard and an unofficial military medal of the United States. It is awarded by the U.S. states of Louisiana and Texas, and in ribbon form only by the State of Alaska.

== Asia ==
=== Republic of China ===
Awards and decorations of China

=== North Vietnam ===
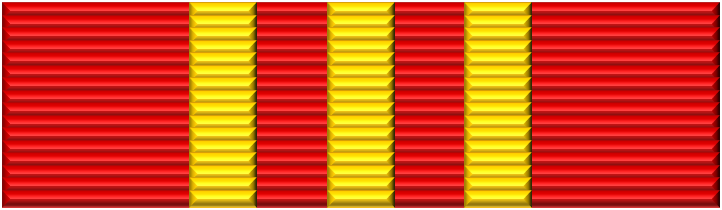
Ho Chi Minh Order
Defeat American Aggression Badge
Vietnam Liberation Order

=== South Vietnam ===
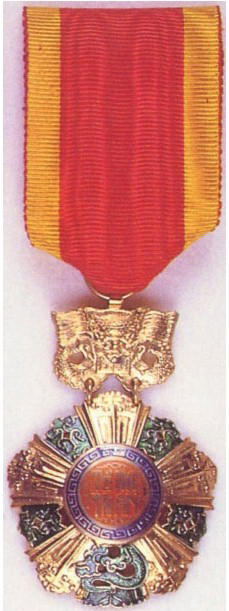
National Order of Vietnam

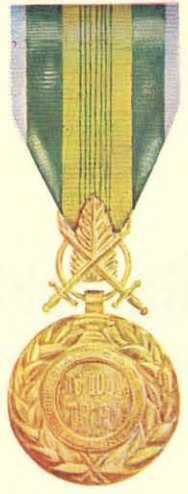
Military Merit Medal

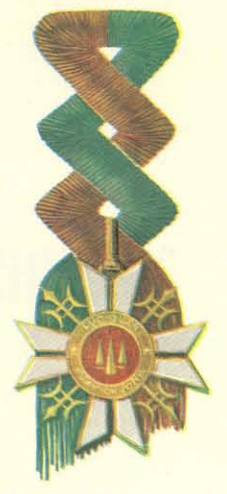
Army Distinguished Service Order

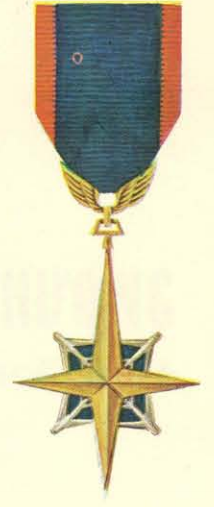
Air Force Distinguished Service Order

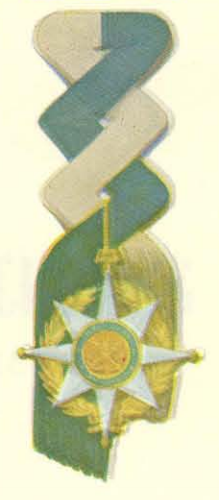
Navy Distinguished Service Order

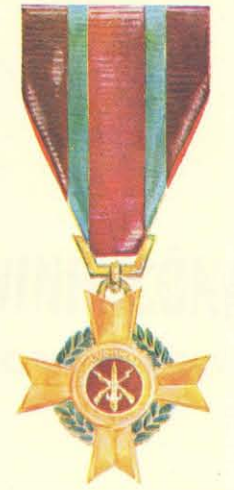
Army Meritorious Service Medal

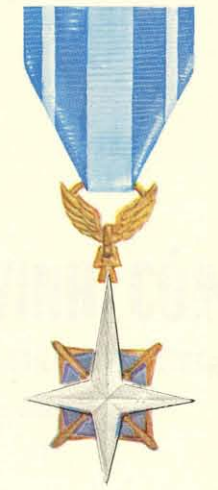
Air Force Meritorious Service Medal

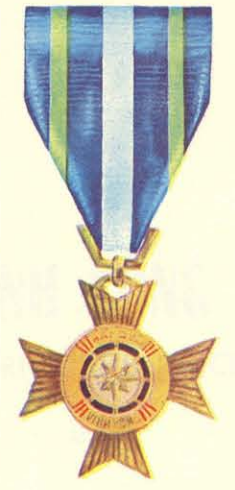
Navy Meritorious Service Medal

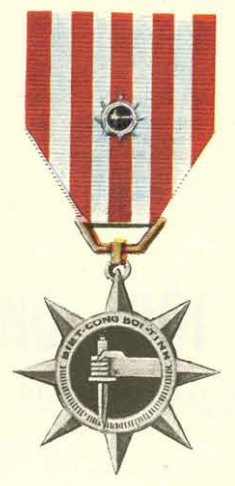
Special Service Medal

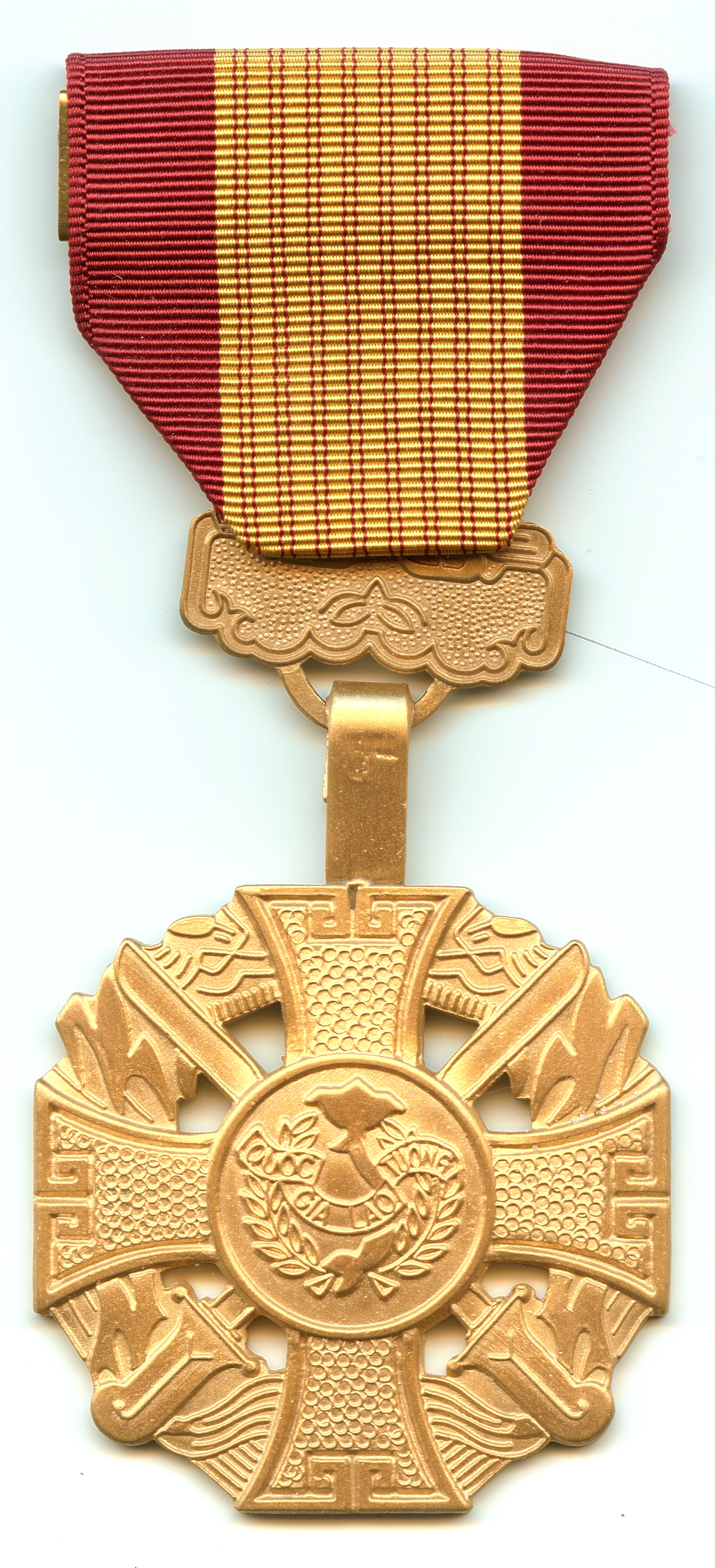
Gallantry Cross

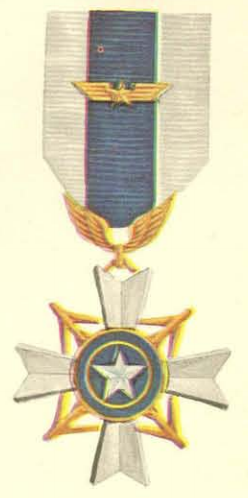
Air Gallantry Cross

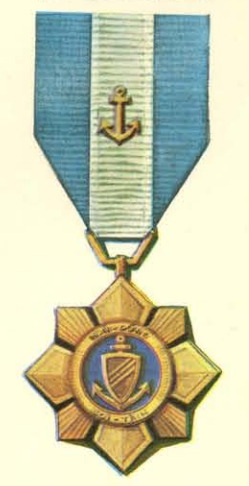
Navy Gallantry Cross

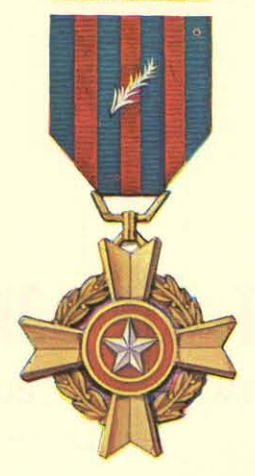
Hazardous Service Medal

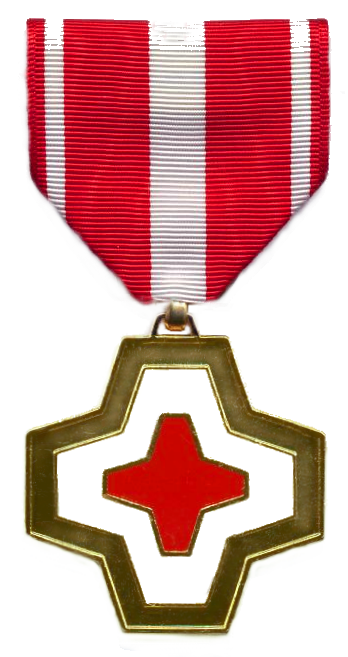
Life Saving Medal

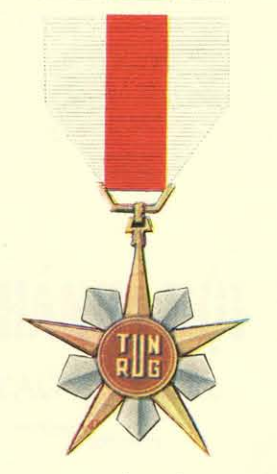
Loyalty Medal

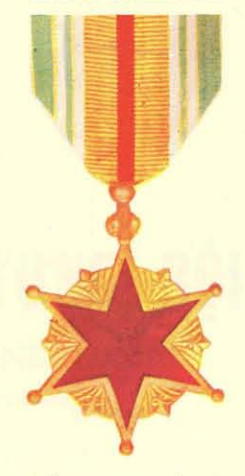
Wound Medal

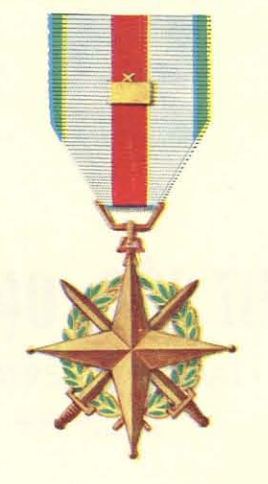
Leadership Medal

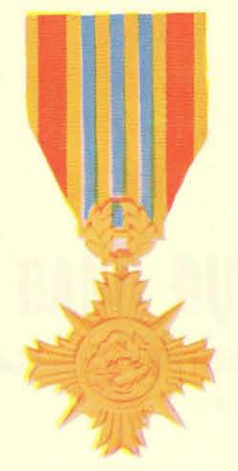
Armed Forces Honor Medal (First Class)

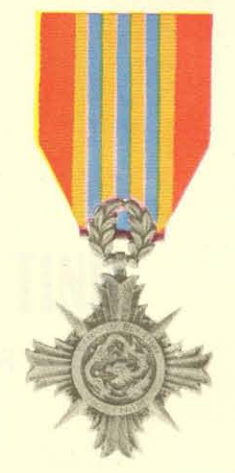
Armed Forces Honor Medal (Second Class)

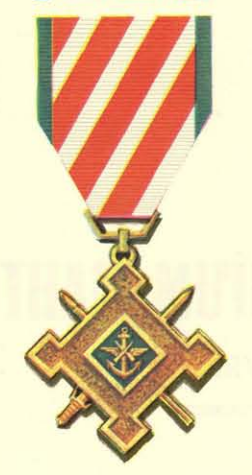
Staff Service Medal (First Class)

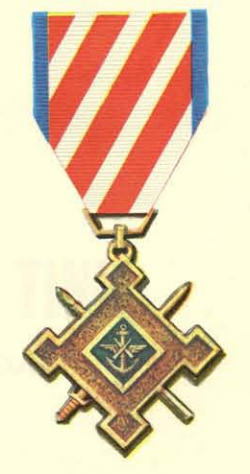
Staff Service Medal (Second Class)

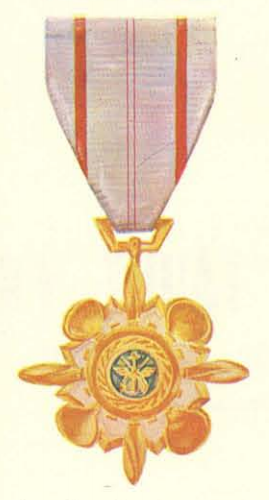
Technical Service Medal (First Class)

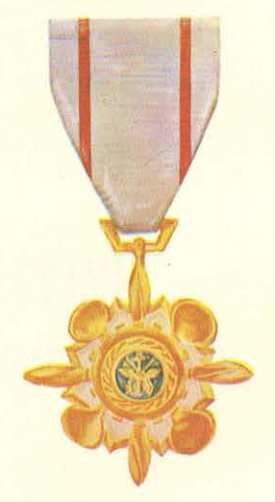
Technical Service Medal (Second Class)

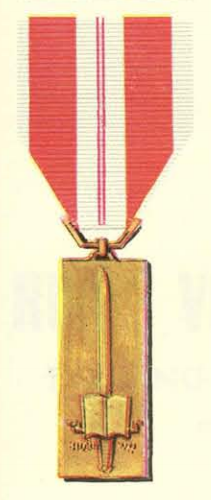
Training Service Medal (First Class)

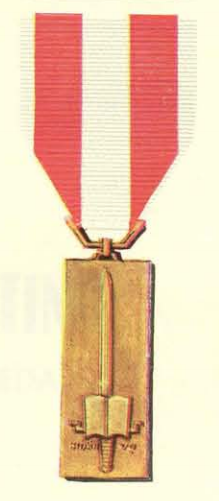
Training Service Medal (Second Class)

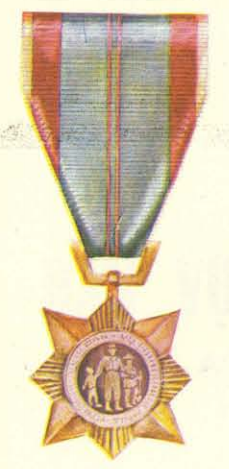
Civil Actions Medal (First Class)

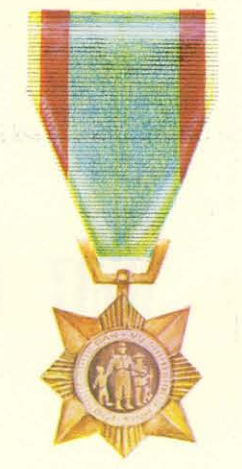
Civil Actions Medal (Second Class)

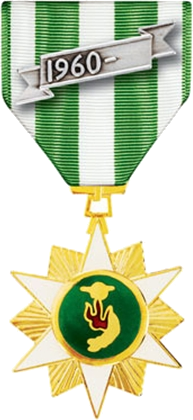
Vietnam Campaign Medal

Vietnam Presidential Unit Citation

Vietnam Gallantry Cross Unit Citation

Vietnam Civil Actions Unit Citation

=== North Korea ===
Awards and decorations of North Korea

=== Republic of Korea (South Korea) ===
South Korean Presidential Unit Citation
Korean War Service Medal
Order of National Security Merit
Tong-il Medal
Gugseon Medal
Cheon-Su Medal
Sam-il Medal
Gwangbog Medal
Order of Military Merit
Taeguk Cordon Medal
Eulji Cordon Medal
Chungmu Cordon Medal
Hwarang Cordon Medal
Inheon Cordon Medal

== Europe ==
=== East Germany ===
Orders, decorations, and medals of East Germany

=== West Germany ===
Order of Merit
Sonderstufe des Großkreuzes (Grand Cross special class)
Großkreuz (Grand Cross 1st class, special design)
Großkreuz (Grand Cross 1st class)
Großes Verdienstkreuz mit Stern und Schulterband (Grand Cross with Star and Sash)

International equivalent: Großkreuz 2. Klasse (Grand Cross of Merit, Second class) or Großkomturkreuz (Grand Commander's Cross)

Großes Verdienstkreuz mit Stern (Knight Commander's Cross or Grand Cross with Star)
Großes Verdienstkreuz (Halskreuz) (Commander's Cross or Grand Cross (Neck cross))
Verdienstkreuz 1. Klasse (Officer's Cross)
Verdienstkreuz am Bande (Cross) International equivalent: Ritterkreuz (Knight's Cross)
Verdienstmedaille (Medal)

The President of the Federal Republic holds the Sonderstufe des Großkreuzes ex officio. It is awarded to him in a ceremony by the President of the Bundestag attended by the Chancellor, the President of the Bundesrat and the Supreme Court President. Other than the President of the Federal Republic, only a foreign head of state can be awarded with the highest class. There is also the provision of awarding the Großkreuz in a special rare design, in which the central medallion with the black eagle is surrounded by a stylized laurel wreath in relief. which has so far only been used twice: for Konrad Adenauer and for Helmut Kohl.

=== Soviet Union ===
Orders, decorations, and medals of the Soviet Union

== International Organizations ==
=== Inter-American Defense Board ===
Inter-American Defense Board Medal

=== International Commission of Control and Supervision ===
International Commission for Supervision and Control Medal; Indo-China, (1954–1974)
International Commission of Control and Supervision Service Medal, Vietnam (1973)

=== United Nations ===
United Nations Service Medal
United Nations Medal
