= Awards and decorations of the Vietnam War =

Awards and decorations of the Vietnam War were military decorations which were bestowed by the major warring parties that participated in the Vietnam War. North Vietnam, South Vietnam, Australia, New Zealand and the United States all issued awards and decorations to their personnel during, or after, the conflict.

South Vietnam as a country ceased to exist after North Vietnam's victory in the Vietnam War. Therefore, the country of South Vietnam's awards and decorations are considered obsolete. With the fall of South Vietnam, that country's official records of who received which awards disappeared. Records or evidence of awards were sometimes maintained by U.S. military units or in an award recipient's service record, so those may be available to an award recipient looking for confirmation of a (defunct) foreign country award received.

Despite being obsolete, earned foreign South Vietnam decorations and awards remain authorized for US military members who received awards. If an award recipient no longer possesses an original award, companies or individuals have available for purchase South Vietnam's military insignia and awards.

== South Vietnam ==
=== Senior leadership decorations ===
- National Order of Vietnam
  - Grand Cross
  - Grand Officer
  - Commander
  - Officer
  - Knight
- Vietnam Distinguished Service Order
  - Army First Class Ribbon
  - Army Second Class Ribbon
  - Navy First Class Ribbon
  - Navy Second Class Ribbon
  - Air Force First Class Ribbon
  - Air Force Second Class Ribbon

=== Heroism decorations ===
- Vietnam Military Merit Medal

=== Common decorations ===
- Vietnam Gallantry Cross
  - Vietnam Gallantry Cross with Palm Ribbon
  - Vietnam Gallantry Cross with Gold Star Ribbon
  - Vietnam Gallantry Cross with Silver Star Ribbon
  - Vietnam Gallantry Cross with Bronze star Ribbon
- Vietnam Civil Actions Medal
  - First Class Ribbon
  - Second Class Ribbon
- Vietnam Campaign Medal

=== Unit citations ===
- Vietnam Presidential Unit Citation
- Vietnam Gallantry Cross Unit Citation
- Vietnam Civil Actions Unit Citation

=== Other awards ===
- Vietnam Special Service Medal
- Vietnam Armed Forces Honor Medal
  - First Class Ribbon
  - Second Class Ribbon
- Vietnam Staff Service Medal
  - First Class Ribbon
  - Second Class Ribbon
- Vietnam Air Gallantry Cross
  - Vietnam Air Gallantry Cross with Gold Wing Ribbon
  - Vietnam Air Gallantry Cross with Silver Wing Ribbon
  - Vietnam Air Gallantry Cross with Bronze Wing Ribbon
- Vietnam Navy Gallantry Cross
  - Vietnam Navy Gallantry Cross with Gold Anchor Ribbon
  - Vietnam Navy Gallantry Cross with Silver Anchor Ribbon
  - Vietnam Navy Gallantry Cross with Bronze Anchor Ribbon

== North Vietnam ==
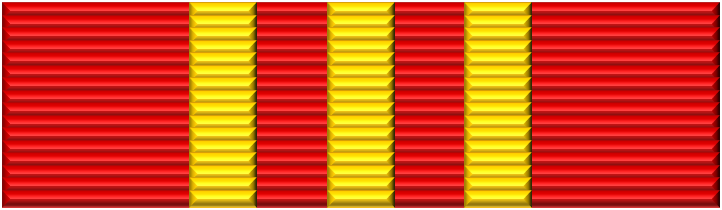
- Ho Chi Minh Order
- Defeat American Aggression Badge
- Vietnam Liberation Order

== United States ==
Medal of Honor

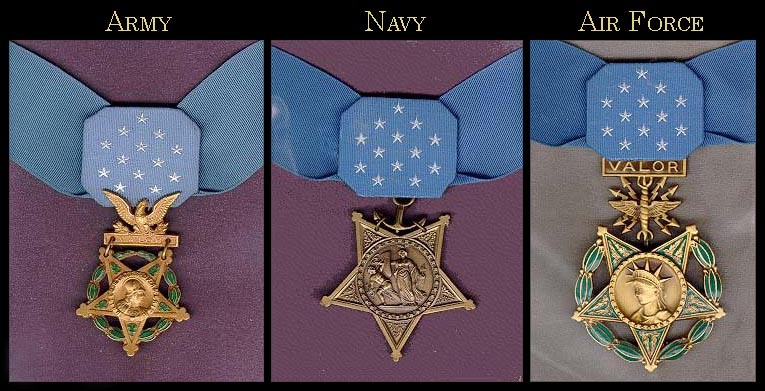

Distinguished Service Cross
(Navy Cross, Airforce Cross)

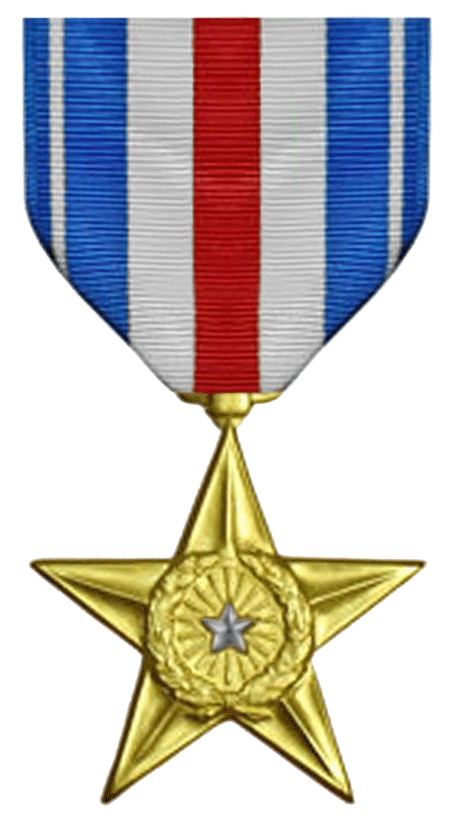
Silver Star

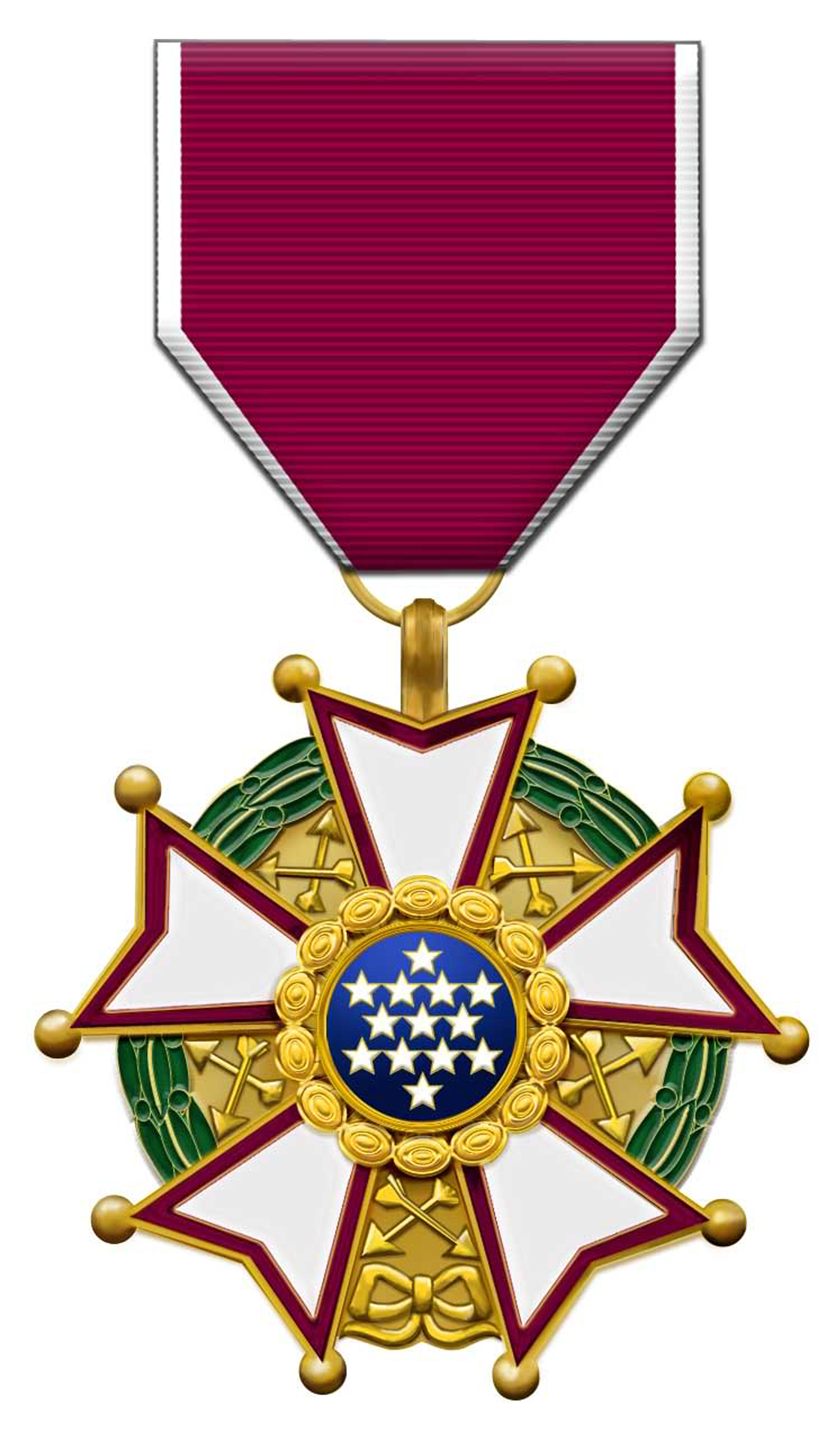
Legion of Merit

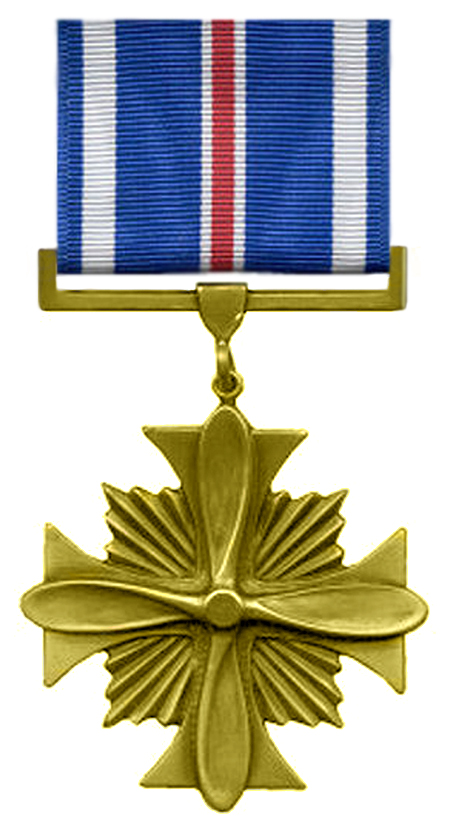
Distinguished Flying Cross

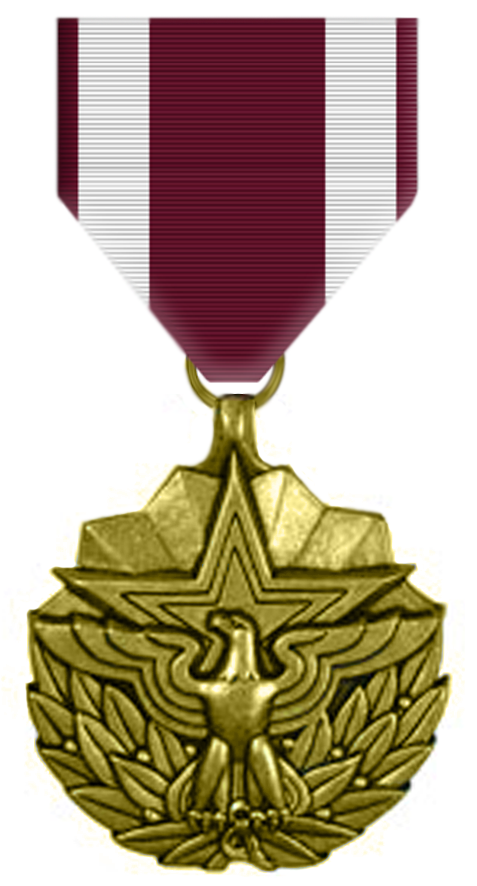
Meritorious Service Medal

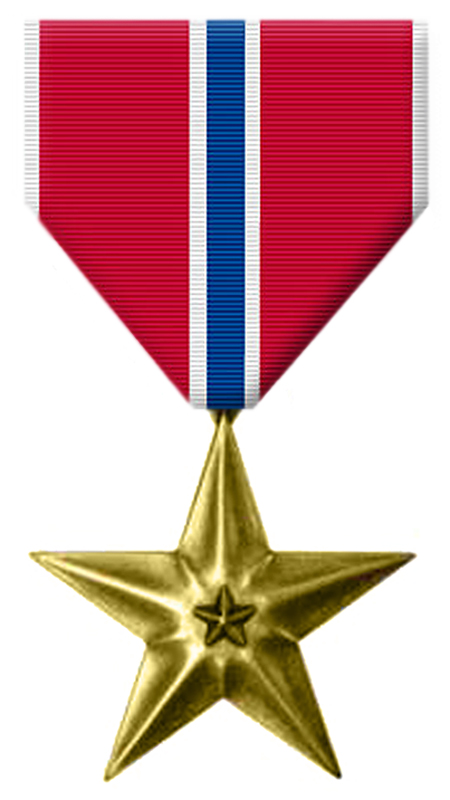
Bronze Star Medal

Purple Heart

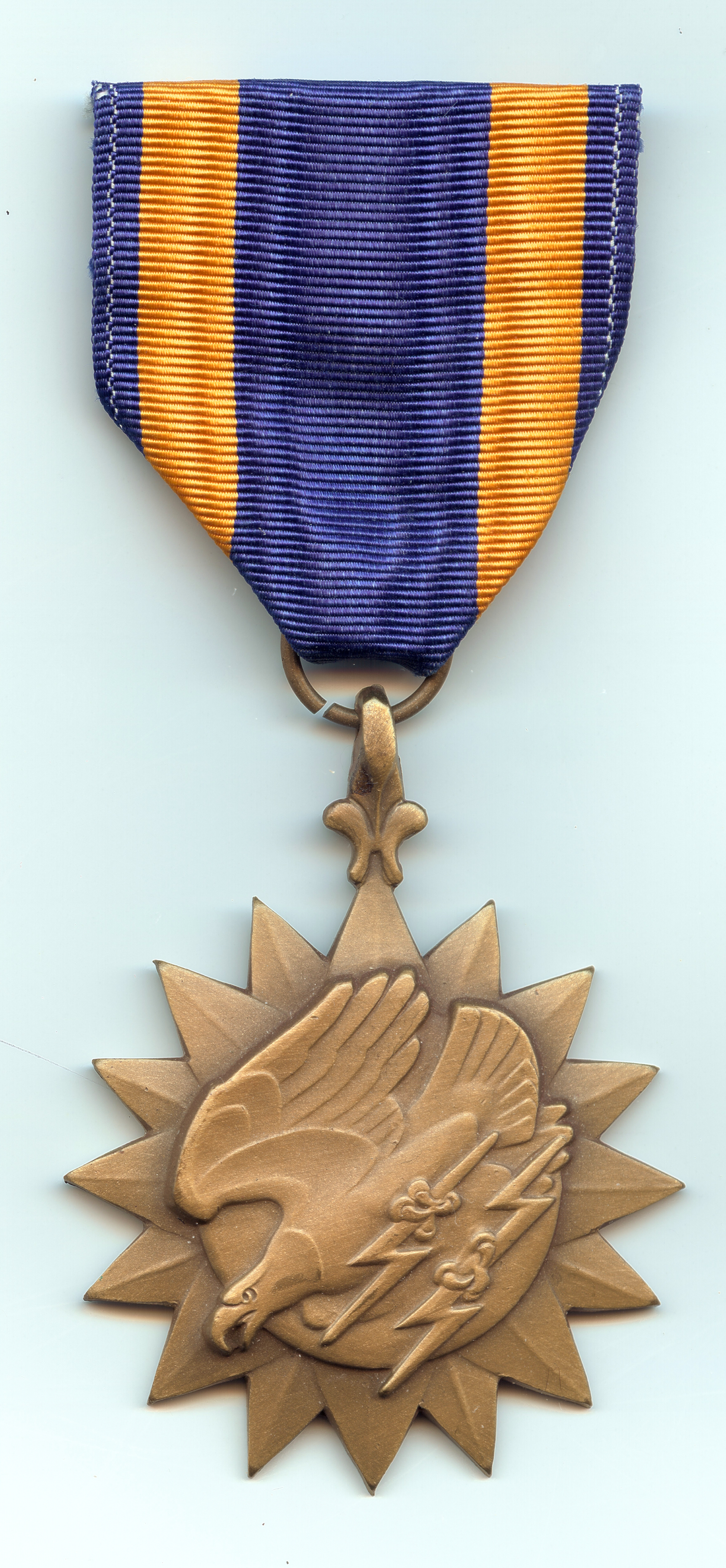
Air Medal

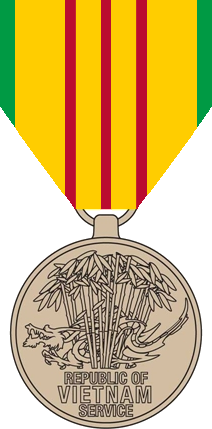
Vietnam Service Medal

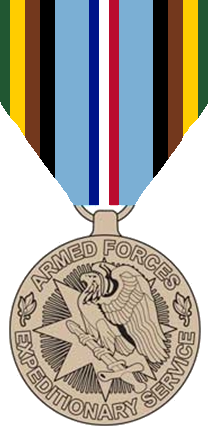
Armed Forces Expeditionary Medal

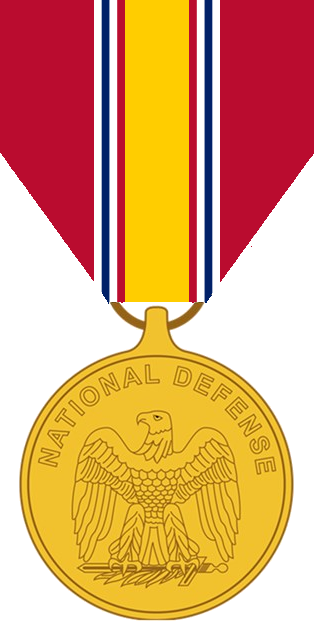
National Defense Service Medal

Several decorations (Distinguished Flying Cross, Bronze Star Medal, Air Medal, Commendation Medal, Joint Service Commendation Medal) may be awarded for valor, or for merit. Awards for valor recognize bravery in action against an enemy and have an attached "V" device valor device. Awards for merit recognize service.

The Commendation Medal was another decoration of the Vietnam War, issued frequently in various versions by the different branches of the US armed forces.

== Australia and New Zealand ==
Australia and New Zealand awarded British and Commonwealth orders and decorations to their servicemen in Vietnam, including the Distinguished Service Order and the Military Cross

Australia and New Zealand jointly developed and instituted the Vietnam Medal (though separate Royal Warrants were issued). The obverse of the medal displays an effigy of Queen Elizabeth II, the reverse shows a man standing between two spheres, a symbolic representation of the ideological struggle. The ribbon incorporates the colours of the three armed services (red, navy blue, and sky blue), and the national colours of Vietnam (red and yellow).

In 1992, Australia struck the Vietnam Logistic and Support Medal. The medal was intended to recognise the Australian servicemen and civilians who provided support for Australian troops. The qualifying criteria for the Medal are service of one day or more as a member or crew of a ship or aircraft operating in the prescribed area of operations of Vietnam in support of Australian forces, or service of one day or more within the prescribed area of operations of Vietnam while attached to a unit or organisation in support of Australian forces. It has been awarded to military personnel, Qantas crews, civilian medical personnel, and Embassy staff.

Australia awarded four Victoria Crosses during the Vietnam War, two posthumously.

Australian servicemen were also awarded a number of individual US and South Vietnamese awards, and the following unit citations:

- HMAS Hobart – US Navy Unit Commendation
- HMAS Perth – US Navy Unit Commendation, US Navy Meritorious Unit Commendation
- Clearance Diving Team 3 – US Presidential Unit Citation, Two US Navy Unit Commendations and one US Navy Meritorious Unit Commendation
- 817 Naval Air Squadron – US Navy Meritorious Unit Commendation
- AATTV – Republic of Vietnam Gallantry Cross Unit Citation, US Meritorious Unit Commendation, US Presidential Unit Citation
- 1 RAR – US Meritorious Unit Commendation, Republic of Vietnam Gallantry Cross Unit Citation and Unit Citation for Gallantry
- 3 RAR – Unit Citation for Gallantry
- 'D' Coy, 6 RAR – US Presidential Unit Citation
- 8 RAR – Republic of Vietnam Gallantry Cross Unit Citation
- No. 2 Squadron RAAF - Republic of Vietnam Gallantry Cross Unit Citation, USAF Outstanding Unit Award
