= George B. Simler =

United States Air Force general

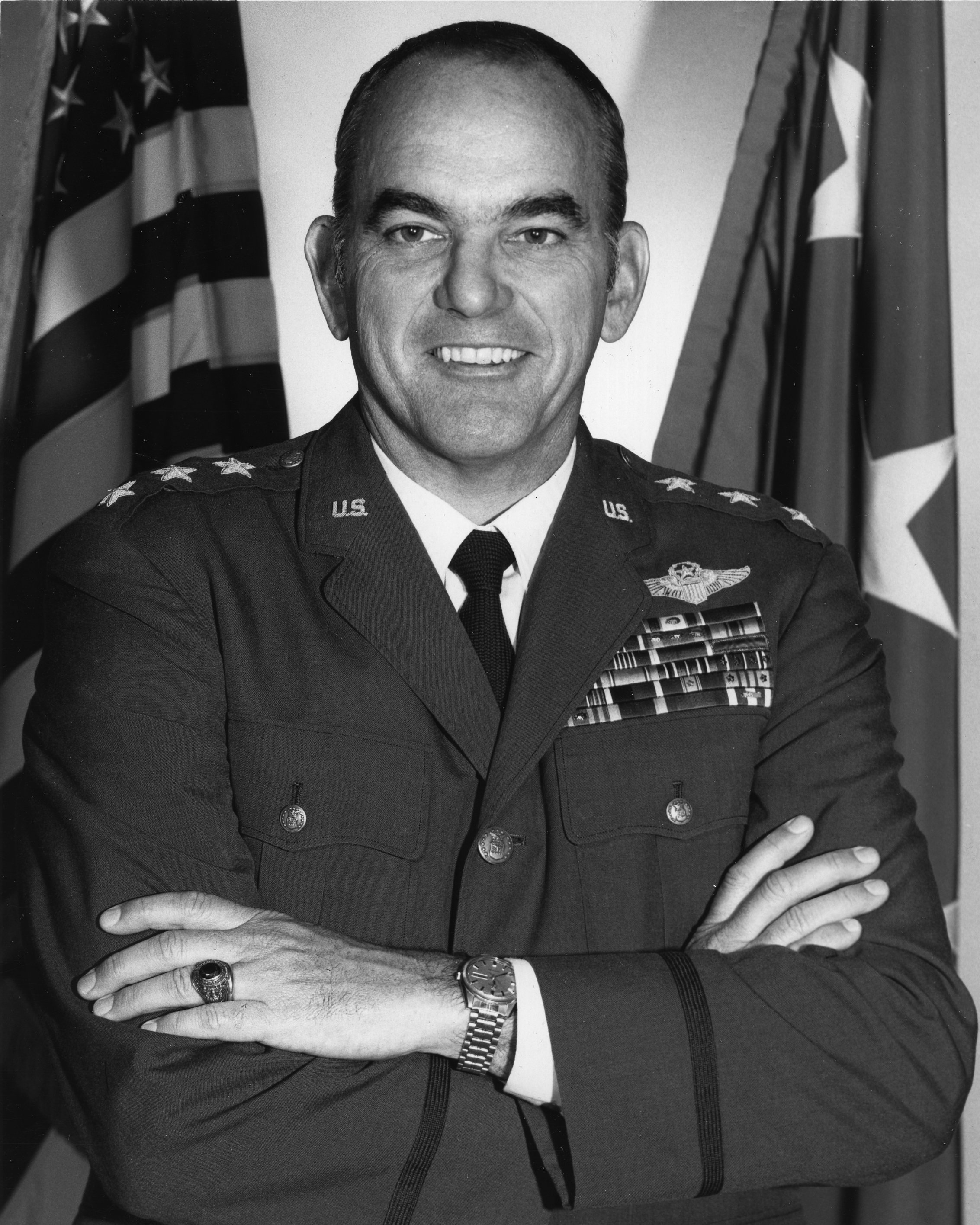
- General George B. Simler (pictured as Lieutenant General)
- Born: February 16, 1921; Johnstown, Pennsylvania, U.S.
- Died: September 9, 1972 (aged 51); Randolph Air Force Base, Texas, U.S.
- Military career
- Allegiance: United States of America
- Branch: United States Air Force
- Service years: 1942–1972
- Rank: General (posthumous)
- Commands: Air Training Command
- Conflicts: World War II; Vietnam War
- Awards: Legion of Merit (2); Distinguished Flying Cross (2); Air Medal (12); Purple Heart

George Brenner Simler (February 16, 1921 – September 9, 1972) was a United States Air Force general, who served as commander of the U.S. Air Force's Air Training Command.

== Background and education ==
Simler was born in 1921, in Johnstown, Pennsylvania. He entered the University of Maryland in 1940 and was commissioned a Second Lieutenant in August 1942. He returned to the University of Maryland in 1946 as the first professor of Air Science and Tactics at the university. He later enrolled as a student to complete his college work, graduating in 1948. He graduated from the National War College in 1961.

== Military assignments ==
Simler served two combat tours in the European Theater of Operations during World War II. In July 1944, on his second combat tour, he was shot down, evaded capture, and successfully returned to the Allied lines in September 1944.

Following assignments as commander of the 86th Fighter-Bomber Group and the 355th Fighter Group, Simler was assigned to the United States Air Force Academy as director of athletics. Later in his life, he led the campaign to establish the Commander-in-Chief's Trophy, the annual football competition between the three U.S. service academies.

Simler was next assigned overseas to Kadena Air Base, Okinawa, Japan, and became commander of the 18th Tactical Fighter Wing, which was the first Pacific Air Forces organization to convert to the F-105 Thunderchief. In June 1965 following an assignment as commander of the Tactical Fighter Weapons Center, Nellis Air Force Base, Nevada, he went to Southeast Asia. During this assignment he was director of operations of the Seventh Air Force and flew combat missions in every tactical strike aircraft assigned to the Seventh Air Force.

From Southeast Asia, Simler was assigned to Headquarters U.S. Air Force, where he became director of operations in August 1967. He became vice commander of United States Air Forces in Europe in July 1969. Simler assumed command of Air Training Command in September 1970.

Simler, along with his aide Captain Gil L. Gillespie, was killed in the crash of a T-38 Talon jet trainer on takeoff at Randolph Air Force Base, Texas, on September 9, 1972. He was scheduled to be promoted to the grade of General and take command of the Military Airlift Command at Scott Air Force Base, Illinois, on September 12, 1972. He was posthumously promoted to the grade of General effective August 16, 1972.

== Awards and decorations ==
Simler's military decorations include the Air Force Distinguished Service Medal with oak leaf cluster, Legion of Merit with oak leaf cluster, Distinguished Flying Cross with oak leaf cluster, Air Medal with 11 oak leaf clusters, Air Force Commendation Medal, Army Commendation Medal, Purple Heart, and the Vietnam Air Gallantry Cross.

- Air Force Distinguished Service Medal with oak leaf cluster
- Legion of Merit with oak leaf cluster
- Distinguished Flying Cross with oak leaf cluster
- Purple Heart
- Air Medal with eleven oak leaf clusters
- Air Force Commendation Medal
- Army Commendation Medal
- Vietnam Air Gallantry Cross
