= Timothy Slottow =

American businessman

7th President of the University of Phoenix
- In office 2014–2017
- Preceded by: Bill Pepicello
- Succeeded by: Peter Cohen

Personal details
- Education: University of California, Berkeley (BA); University of Washington (MBA)

Timothy P. Slottow is an American businessman who worked as the president of the University of Phoenix from 2014 to 2017 and later as Executive Vice President of Finance and Chief Financial Officer at Kamehameha Schools until his retirement in February 2022. He previously spent 16 years at the University of Michigan, including as vice president and CFO.

== Education ==
Slottow earned a Bachelor of Arts degree in human physiology from the University of California, Berkeley and a Master of Business Administration from the Foster School of Business at the University of Washington.

== Career ==
After graduating from business school, Slottow worked various positions at Amtrak, the city of Seattle, and Accenture.

In 1998, Slottow was hired as the executive vice president and CFO at the University of Michigan. At the University of Michigan, Slottow managed thousands of employees and served as the leader and manager of building construction, IT services, investment management, and HR. He steered the University of Michigan during the recession, managing a $6.5 billion budget and a $16 billion asset portfolio.

While at Michigan, Slottow intervened in a major dispute between the university and Coca-Cola about alleged human rights violations. Slottow supported, and ultimately won, an investigation into Coca-Cola's labor practices. In late-2005 and early-2006, the University of Michigan stopped buying Coca-Cola products. Allegations surfaced about alleged human rights violations by Coca-Cola. The university requested that Coca-Cola audit the alleged violations, but the company refused. After four months of suspended contracts between University of Michigan and Coca-Cola, Slottow worked with the university's administration to resume contracts with Coca-Cola in exchange for independent investigations into the alleged violations. The International Labour Organization was one of the organizations that agreed to investigate the labor practices. In his public letter to Coca-Cola, which Slottow co-wrote with another Michigan executive, he said "We respect the reputation and track record of ILO in advancing the rights of workers around the world.”"

An article about Slottow in the University of Michigan's student newspaper, The Michigan Daily, praised Slottow for “wide-ranging responsibility for a $5.2 billion enterprise” and said “Timothy Slottow couldn’t be more of an exception.”

In 2014, he was hired to run the University of Phoenix. After he announced his departure from Ann Arbor, the president of the University of Michigan publicly praised his efforts to grow the university's endowment fund to $8.4 billion. At the University of Michigan, Slottow oversaw operating revenues, financial and physical assets.

In October 2015, Slottow wrote to an open letter to alumni of the University of Phoenix after the United States Department of Defense placed its memorandum of understanding (MOU) with the school in probationary status.

Slottow has published his views of University of Phoenix on Inside Higher Ed, including his view in response to columnist Matt Reed's column about whether the university was a "good" school. He also wrote about the White House College Scorecard upon data released in September 2015.

From 2018 to 2022, Slottow was the executive vice president and CFO of Kamehameha Schools. He retired in February 2022.

== Personal life ==
Slottow is married to Marie Slottow. For his "silver" wedding anniversary (25 years), Slottow danced with his wife—a competitive ballroom dancer—at the Michigan Theater for a benefit for the Make-a-Wish Foundation.
