= Bill Pepicello =

American academic

6th President of the University of Phoenix
- In office 2006–2014
- Succeeded by: Timothy Slottow

Personal details
- Born: William Pepicello Erie, Pennsylvania, U.S.
- Education: Gannon University (BA); Brown University (MA, PhD)

William Pepicello is an American academic administrator who worked as the sixth president of the University of Phoenix from 2006 to 2014.

== Early life and education ==
Born in Erie, Pennsylvania, Pepicello earned a Bachelor of Arts degree in classics from Gannon University. He later went on to earn a master's degree and a doctorate degree in linguistics from Brown University.

== Career ==
Pepicello began his career as an assistant professor of English at the University of Delaware. He later worked as chair of the classics department at Temple University and regional dean of National University. Pepicello joined the University of Phoenix in 1995 and worked as provost, vice provost for academic affairs, and dean of the School of Advanced Studies. He became the university's sixth president in 2006 and remained in the position until 2014. During Pepicello's tenure as president, the University of Phoenix faced controversy over its recruitment practices.
