= James G. Zimmerly =

American physician (1941–2002)

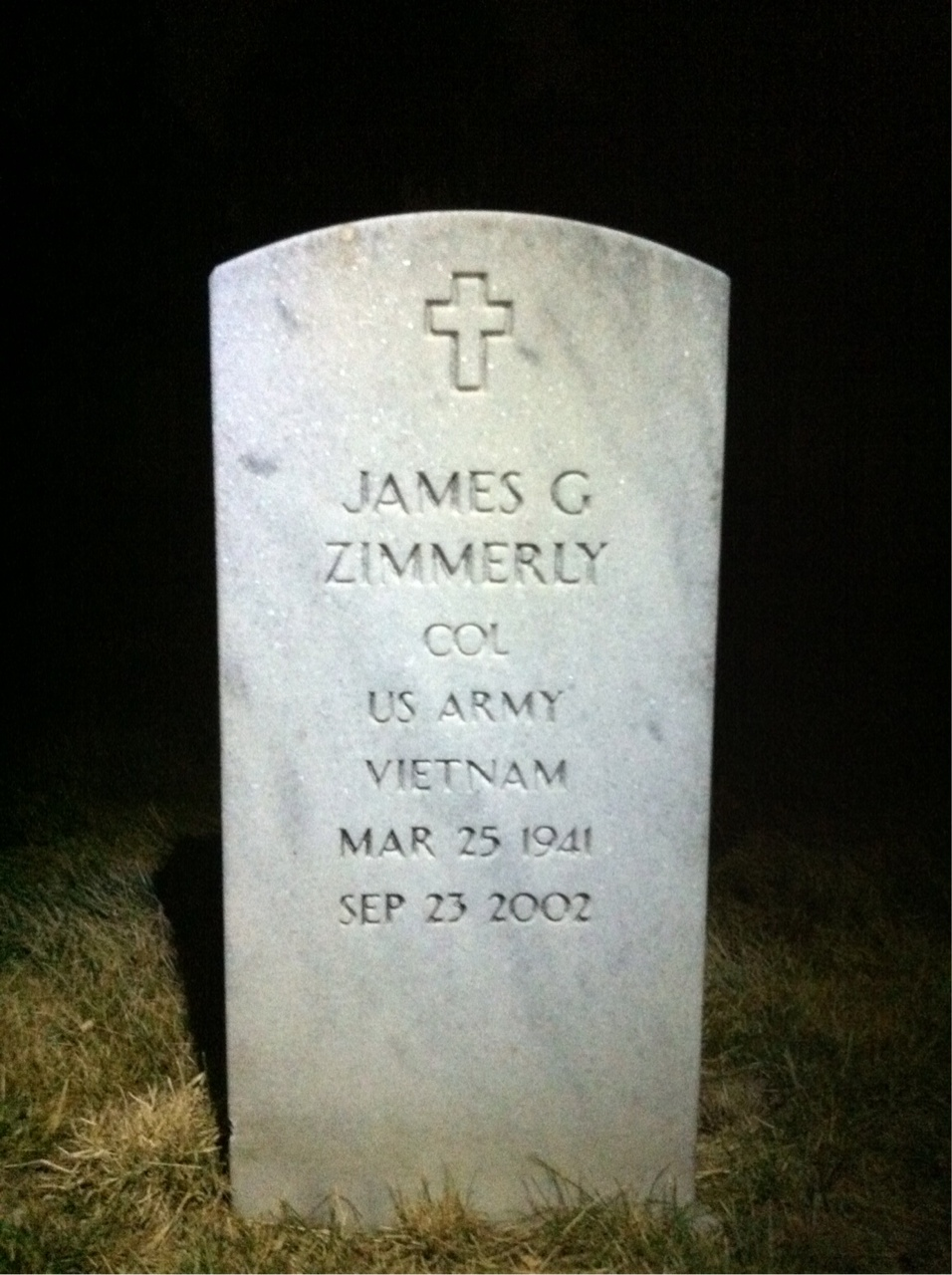
Grave at Arlington National Cemetery

James Gregory Zimmerly (March 25, 1941 – September 23, 2002) was an American emergency department physician and chief of legal medicine at the Armed Forces Institute of Pathology. He co–discovered a vaccine for meningitis in 1970. He died in 2002 following a brain aneurysm and is buried at Arlington National Cemetery, in Arlington, Virginia.

== Education ==
Zimmerly received a BA from Gannon College in 1962. He studied law and medicine while serving in the US Army. He obtained his MD from the University of Maryland School of Medicine in 1966 and studied law at the University of Maryland School of Law while working as an intern at Walter Reed General Hospital, graduating in 1969. He also completed a MPH at Johns Hopkins University in 1968.

== Military career ==
While serving two tours in Vietnam and Cambodia, Zimmerly tracked infectious diseases including malaria, hepatitis and tuberculosis with the aim of protecting troops. For his work in Vietnam, he was awarded the Bronze Star, the National Defense Service Medal, the Joint Services Commendation Medal and the Republic of Vietnam Gallantry Cross. He retired with the rank of colonel.

== Medical work ==
Zimmerly co-discovered the vaccine for meningitis while completing his residency at Walter Reed Army Medical Center. After the initial animal studies for the vaccine failed, he tested it on himself, before going on to conduct a full study on 13,763 army recruits.

He became the chief of legal medicine for the Armed Forces Institute of Pathology in 1971 and served as chair until 1991. After he retired from the Army he served as chair and president at the Baltimore Rh Typing Laboratory as well as working for Monumental Life Insurance as a medical director.
