= Rocco Pugliese =

- Education: Gannon University; Penn State University

Rocco Pugliese is a lobbyist in Pennsylvania, where he is the founder of Pugliese Associates.

He earned a degree from Gannon University in 1975. He also earned a Master of Public Administration degree from Penn State University. He then worked as a staffer in the Pennsylvania Senate and Pennsylvania House Transportation Committee. In 1980, he founded Pugliese Associates.

Pugilese and his firm are known for their relationship with the Pennsylvania House Republican Caucus and for their specialty in economic development projects.

The Pennsylvania Report named him to "The Pennsylvania Report Power 75" list of influential figures in Pennsylvania politics in 2003, commenting on his close ties to John Perzel. In 2009, the Pennsylvania Report named him to "The Pennsylvania Report 100" list of influential figures in Pennsylvania politics.
