= Gannon University =

Private university in Erie, Pennsylvania, U.S.

- Former names: Villa Maria College (1925–1989); Cathedral College (1933–1944); Gannon College of Arts and Sciences (1944–1964); Gannon College (1964–1979)
- Motto: Sanitas, Scientia, Sanctitas
- Motto in English: Health, Knowledge, Holiness
- Type: Private university
- Established: 1925; 101 years ago
- Religious affiliation: Catholic Church
- Academic affiliations: ACCU; CIC; CUMU; NAICU; Space-grant
- Endowment: $138.4 million (2025)
- President: Keith Taylor
- Students: 4,189 (fall 2024)
- Undergraduates: 2,768 (fall 2024)
- Postgraduates: 1,421 (fall 2024)
- Location: Erie, Pennsylvania, Pepper Pike, Ohio, and Ruskin, Florida, U.S. 42°7′42″N 80°5′20″W
- Campus: Urban
- Colors: Maroon and gold
- Nickname: Golden Knights
- Sporting affiliations: NCAA Division II – PSAC; CWPA
- Mascot: Victor E. Knight
- Website: gannon.edu
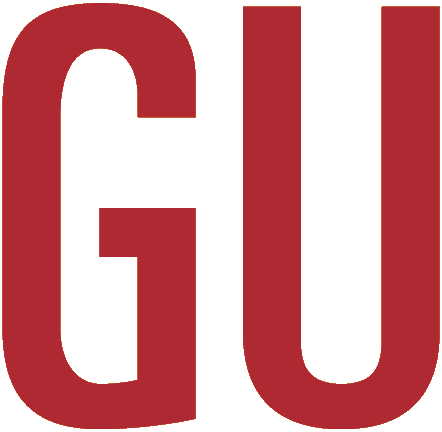

Gannon University is a private Catholic university with campuses in Erie, Pennsylvania, Pepper Pike, Ohio, and Ruskin, Florida, United States. Established in 1925, Gannon University enrolls about 4,600 undergraduate and graduate students annually. Its intercollegiate athletics include 18 athletic programs for men and women competing at the NCAA Division II level. It announced plans to merge with Ursuline College in September 2024 and the merger was completed in November 2026.

== History ==
Gannon University was established in 1933 as the two-year Cathedral College by the Diocese of Erie under the leadership of Joseph J. "Doc" Wehrle. In 1944, the school became the four-year men's school Gannon College of Arts and Sciences, named for then-Bishop of Erie, John Mark Gannon, the driving force behind its opening and development. The college became coeducational in 1964 and gained university status in 1979.

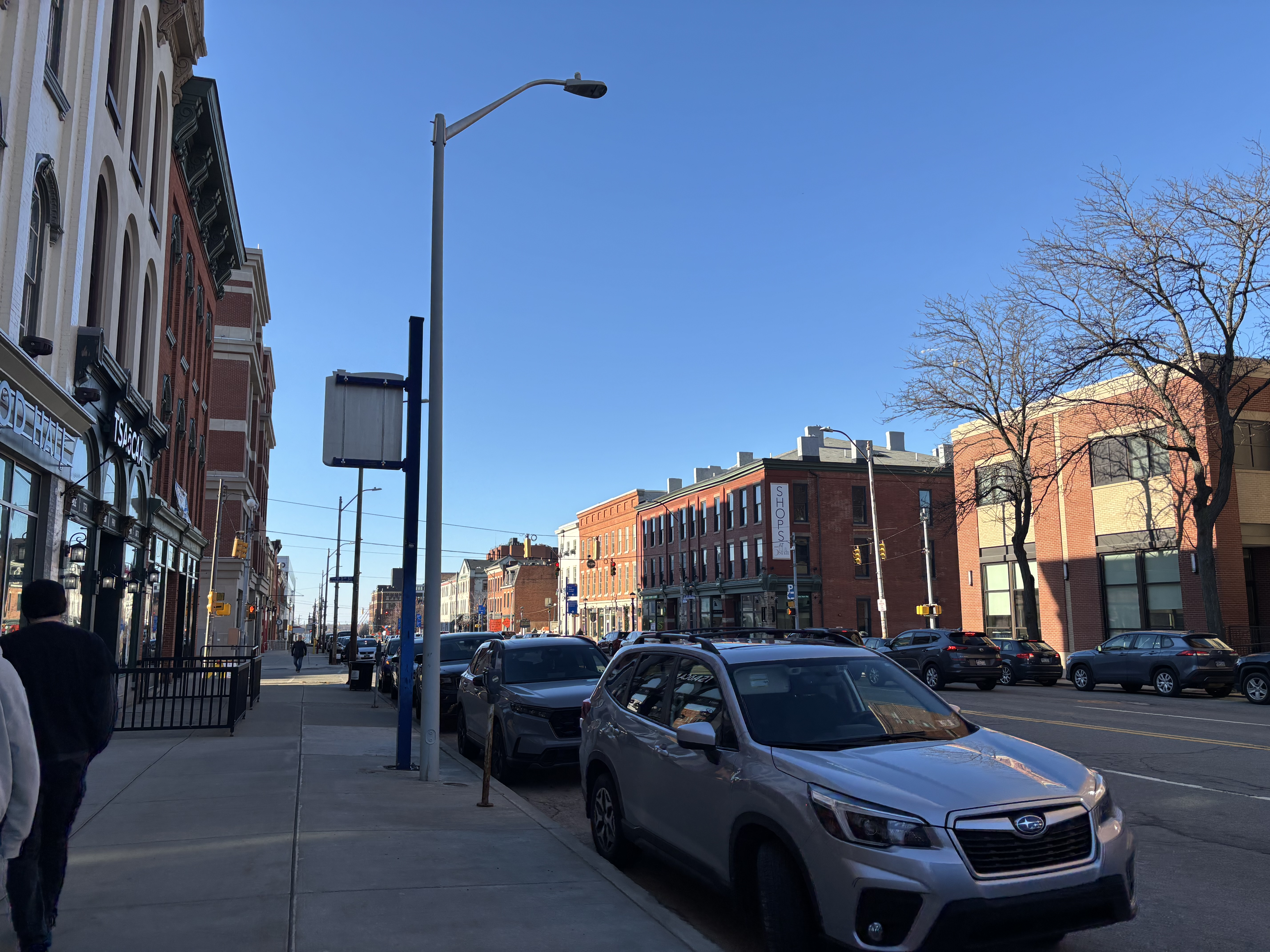
State Street on Gannon University’s campus

The all-girls school Villa Maria College, which was founded by the Sisters of St. Joseph in 1925, merged with the university in 1989. Its Villa Maria School of Nursing retains the name of the original institution.

In 2024, the university's board of trustees approved plans to merge the university with Ursuline College. Ursuline would become a part of Gannon as "Ursuline College Campus of Gannon University" with its own academic and athletic programs. The merger was subsequently finalized in November 2026.

== Academics ==
The university is organized into three main colleges: the College of Engineering and Business, which includes the Dahlkemper School of Business Administration; the College of Humanities, Education and Social Sciences; and the Morosky College of Health Professions and Sciences.

U.S. News & World Report ranked Gannon University No. 260 in National Universities in 2024 and No. 244 in 2025.

== Campus ==
Gannon University's campus is in downtown Erie, primarily between Peach and Myrtle Streets and 3rd and 10th Streets. In summer 2015, a doctoral branch campus opened in Ruskin, Florida, focusing on healthcare majors. Gannon added a third campus in Pepper Pike, Ohio upon the completion of its acquisition of Ursuline College.

== Athletics ==
Gannon is a member of the Pennsylvania State Athletic Conference in NCAA Division II. Gannon offers 19 Division II scholarship-granting varsity sports, that includes nine men's and women's teams. The men participate in baseball, basketball, cross country, football, golf, soccer, swimming, water polo, wrestling, competitive cheer. The women participate in basketball, cross country, golf, lacrosse, soccer, softball, swimming, volleyball, water polo, wrestling, acrobatics and tumbling, and competitive cheer and dance.

In June 2007, Gannon University, along with cross-town rival Mercyhurst College, was accepted into the Pennsylvania State Athletic Conference, where area schools Pennsylvania Western University, Edinboro and Slippery Rock University are members. Along with Gannon and Mercyhurst as full members, LIU Post also was accepted into the conference as an affiliate member.

The school's football program began with the 1949 team that compiled a perfect 8–0 and shut out six of eight opponents. The 1950 team also compiled a winning record of 6–2. However, the teams did not draw well at the box office, and the Gannon board of control voted in April 1951 to discontinue the football program. After the 1950 season, Gannon did not field a college football team for the next 38 years. The school resumed college football competition in 1989. Since 1989, Gannon has competed at the NCAA Division II level.

They won the Division II men’s basketball national championship in 2026, with a 34-3 record.

== Notable alumni ==
- Kevin Benson, meteorologist for WPXI in Pittsburgh
- John Brabender, Republican political consultant
- Italo Cappabianca, member of the Pennsylvania House of Representatives
- Daniel Cudmore, Canadian actor and stuntman
- Marjorie Diehl-Armstrong, convicted murderer
- James Dubik, Lieutenant General in the United States Army
- Isaiah Eisendorf (born 1996), professional basketball player
- William Gehrlein, researcher
- Matthew W. Good, former member of the Pennsylvania House of Representatives
- Steve Grilli, professional baseball player
- Robert J. Heibel, FBI agent
- John Hornaman, member of the Pennsylvania House of Representatives
- Lori Jakiela, author
- Liam Nadler, football player
- Jabs Newby, professional basketball player
- Mark L. Nelson, chemist, scientist, and inventor of Omadacycline, a tetracycline antibiotic
- Andrew Peirson, football player
- Bill Pepicello, president of the University of Phoenix
- Rocco Pugliese, lobbyist in Pennsylvania
- Brad Roae, member of the Pennsylvania House of Representatives
- Sean Rowe, 28th Presiding Bishop of the Episcopal Church
- Joe Schember, 48th mayor of Erie, Pennsylvania (2018–present)
- Joseph E. Sinnott, 47th mayor of Erie, Pennsylvania (2006–2018)
- R. Tracy Seyfert, member of the Pennsylvania House of Representatives
- John Stehr, former CBS News correspondent, hall of fame broadcaster, current mayor of Zionsville, Indiana
- Thomas Joseph Tobin, prelate of the Catholic Church
- Barbara Smith Warner, member of the Oregon House of Representatives
- James G. Zimmerly, physician and co-discoverer of a meningococcal vaccine
