= William Gehrlein =

American academic and researcher (1946–2026)

William V. Gehrlein (June 8, 1946 – July 17, 2026) was an American academic and researcher in the areas of social choice theory, decision theory and graph theory.

Gehrlein received his B.S. in physics from Gannon College in Erie, Pennsylvania, in 1968, his M.S. in physics from Pennsylvania State University in 1972, and his Ph.D. in business administration from Pennsylvania State University in 1975. His teaching interests were operations management and operations research. He was recently professor of business administration at the University of Delaware. Gehrlein died on July 17, 2026, at the age of 80.
