= Meritorious Service Medal (Vietnam) =

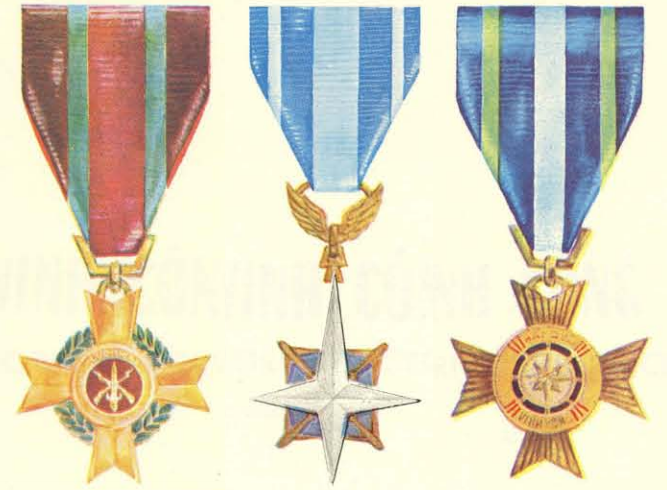
- Meritorious Service Medals (from left to right): Army, Air Force, and Navy
- Type: Single-grade decoration for each service
- Presented by: South Vietnam
- Eligibility: Non-commissioned officers and enlisted personnel of South Vietnam and allied foreign countries
- Status: No longer awarded
- Final award: 1974
- Army, Air Force, and Navy Ribbon bars of each respective medal.

Precedence
- Next (higher): Distinguished Service Order
- Next (lower): Special Service Medal (South Vietnam)

The Meritorious Service Medal (Vietnamese: Vinh-Công Bội-Tinh) was a military decoration of South Vietnam that was awarded between the years of 1950 and 1974. Each of the three branches of the Republic of Vietnam Military Forces had its version of the Meritorious Service Medal. The medal was intended to recognize exceptionally important military achievement, both in combat and non-combat service, but did not warrant receipt of the higher decoration the Distinguished Service Order.

== Criteria ==
The Meritorious Service Medal was awarded, or posthumously awarded, to non-commissioned officers and enlisted personnel in the Republic of Vietnam Military Forces who, during their period of service met one of the following requirements:

- Cited or wounded many times in combat or in the line of duty.
- Accomplishing an exceptionally important achievement that reflects great credit on or is beneficial to the Republic of Vietnam Armed Forces in any field.

The Meritorious Service Medal could also be awarded to foreign non-commissioned officers and enlisted personnel for their meritorious service to the Republic of Vietnam.

== See also ==
- Orders, decorations, and medals of South Vietnam
