= Special Service Medal (South Vietnam) =

Vietnam Special Service Medal
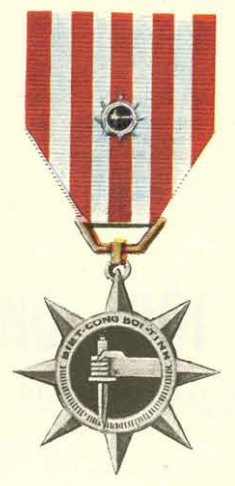
- Special Service Medal with device
- Awarded for: Performing an act of outstanding meritorious service to the Vietnamese State
- Presented by: South Vietnam
- Eligibility: Military personnel only
- Status: No longer awarded
- Established: August 15, 1950
- First award: 1950
- Final award: 1974
- Ribbon of the Special Service Medal with device

Precedence
- Next (higher): Meritorious Service Medal (Army, Air Force, and Navy)
- Next (lower): Gallantry Cross

The Special Service Medal (Vietnamese: Biệt-Công Bội-Tinh) was a decoration of South Vietnam which was issued between the years of 1950 and 1974. The decoration was awarded to any military service member who performed an act of outstanding meritorious service to the Vietnamese State. The Special Service Medal was also awarded to members of foreign militaries and was presented frequently to members of the United States Armed Forces during the years of the Vietnam War.

The U.S. military considered the Special Service Medal to be the equivalent of the Bronze Star. When awarded to U.S. personnel, the decoration was permitted for wear on U.S. uniforms after all United States military awards.

In 1975, with the fall of Saigon, the South Vietnamese military effectively ceased to exist and the Special Service Medal became obsolete. Today, it is only available by private purchase through military insignia dealers.

== See also ==
- Military awards and decorations of South Vietnam
