= Air Gallantry Cross =

Vietnam Air Gallantry Cross
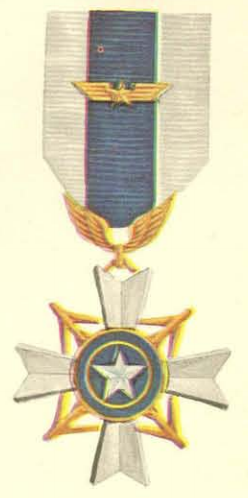
- Air Gallantry Cross with Gold Wing
- Type: Military decoration
- Awarded for: Meritorious or heroic conduct while engaged in aerial combat
- Presented by: South Vietnam
- Eligibility: Military personnel who were engaged in aerial combat
- Status: No longer awarded
- Gold wing ribbon Silver wing ribbon Bronze wing ribbon

Precedence
- Next (higher): Gallantry Cross
- Next (lower): Navy Gallantry Cross
- Related: The American equivalent is the Air Medal

The Vietnam Air Gallantry Cross (Vietnamese: Phi-Dũng Bội-Tinh) was a military decoration of South Vietnam which was issued during the years of the Vietnam War. The Air Gallantry Cross was awarded for meritorious or heroic conduct while engaged in aerial combat. The decoration was comparable to the United States decoration of the Air Medal.

The Air Gallantry Cross was occasionally awarded to members of foreign militaries, but only if an air combat action was performed which directly benefitted Vietnamese war efforts. Pilots of the United States Air Force were often awarded the Air Gallantry Cross.

Separate decorations, known as the Vietnam Gallantry Cross and Vietnam Navy Gallantry Cross, were also issued for general service and naval achievement. These were separate awards from the Vietnam Air Gallantry Cross which came in three different grades: with gold wings, silver wings, and bronze wings.

== Recipients ==
- Daniel Brandenstein
- Robin Olds
- George B. Simler

== See also ==
- Military awards and decorations of South Vietnam

The Air Gallantry Cross was awarded to Naval Aviators operating off aircraft carriers in the Tonkin Gulf and to United States Marine aviators operating from bases in South Vietnam.
