= Defeat American Aggression Badge =

Defeat American Aggression Badge is a military badge given during the Vietnam War by North Vietnam. established in 1965 and given during the Vietnam War by North Vietnam. The badge was awarded to units and individuals who performed outstanding services against American forces. This included any individual, who took part in combat after August 2, 1964
