= Navy Gallantry Cross =

Vietnam Navy Gallantry Cross
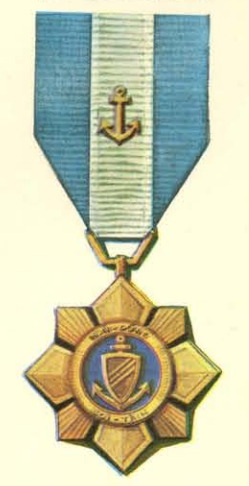
- Navy Gallantry Cross with Bronze Anchor
- Type: Military decoration
- Awarded for: Meritorious or heroic conduct while engaged in naval combat & meritorious service
- Presented by: South Vietnam
- Eligibility: Military personnel who were engaged in naval combat
- Status: No longer awarded
- Gold anchor ribbon Silver anchor ribbon Bronze anchor ribbon

Precedence
- Next (higher): Air Gallantry Cross
- Next (lower): Hazardous Service Medal
- Related: The American equivalent is the Legion of Merit

The Vietnam Navy Gallantry Cross (Vietnamese: Hải-Dũng Bội-Tinh) was a military decoration of South Vietnam which was issued during the years of the Vietnam War. The Navy Gallantry Cross was awarded to any member of the military who displayed meritorious or heroic combat while engaged in naval operations to benefit South Vietnam. The medal was awarded both for combat and non-combat service and was the equivalent of the United States Legion of Merit.

The Navy Gallantry Cross was also awarded to members of foreign military forces, provided that such service members were engaged in direct operational support of Vietnam and that such naval actions benefitted the Vietnamese military. Officers of the United States Navy were frequently awarded the Navy Gallantry Cross.

Similar decorations existed for general service and air service, and were known as the Vietnam Gallantry Cross and Vietnam Air Gallantry Cross. These were separate decorations from the Vietnam Navy Gallantry Cross which came in three different grades: with gold anchor, silver anchor, and bronze anchor.

== See also ==
- Orders, decorations, and medals of South Vietnam
