= Gallantry Cross (South Vietnam) =

Republic of Vietnam Gallantry Cross
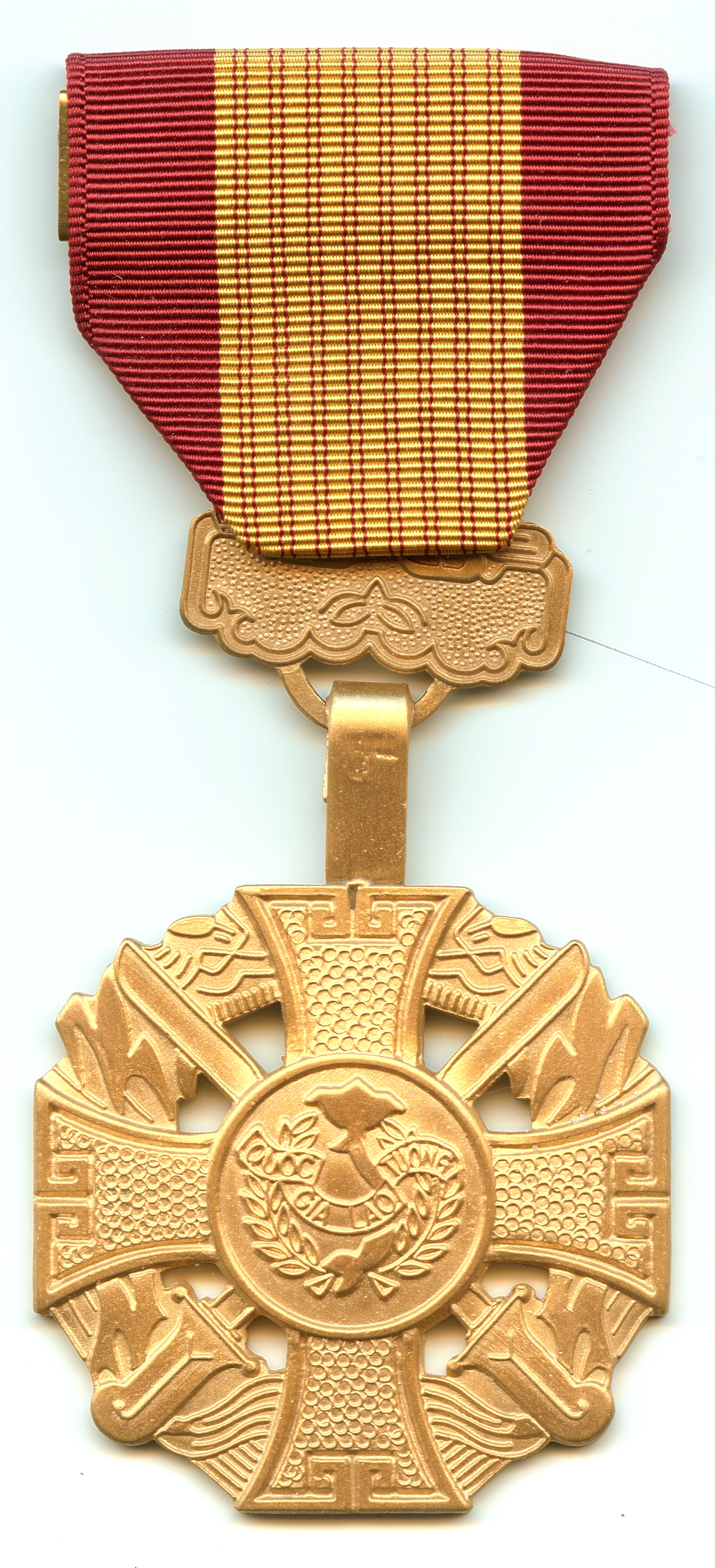
- Type: Military medal (four class decoration); Four degrees: Gallantry Cross with Palm; Gallantry Cross with Gold Star; Gallantry Cross with Silver Star; Gallantry Cross with Bronze Star
- Awarded for: Accomplishing deeds of valor or displaying heroic conduct while fighting the enemy
- Presented by: South Vietnam
- Eligibility: Awarded to military individuals, corps, divisions, regiments, and brigades of the Republic of Vietnam and allied forces
- Status: No longer awarded
- Established: August 15, 1950; May 2, 1952; December 30, 1956; December 2, 1965
- Gallantry Cross Ribbon with Palm Gallantry Cross Ribbon with Gold Star Gallantry Cross Ribbon with Silver Star Gallantry Cross Ribbon with Bronze Star Gallantry Cross Unit Citation (U.S. Army version) Gallantry Cross Unit Citation Emblem with Palm and Frame (in the colors of the Gallantry Cross with Palm and Frame) Streamer

Precedence
- Next (higher): Republic of Vietnam Special Service Medal
- Next (lower): Republic of Vietnam Air Gallantry Cross

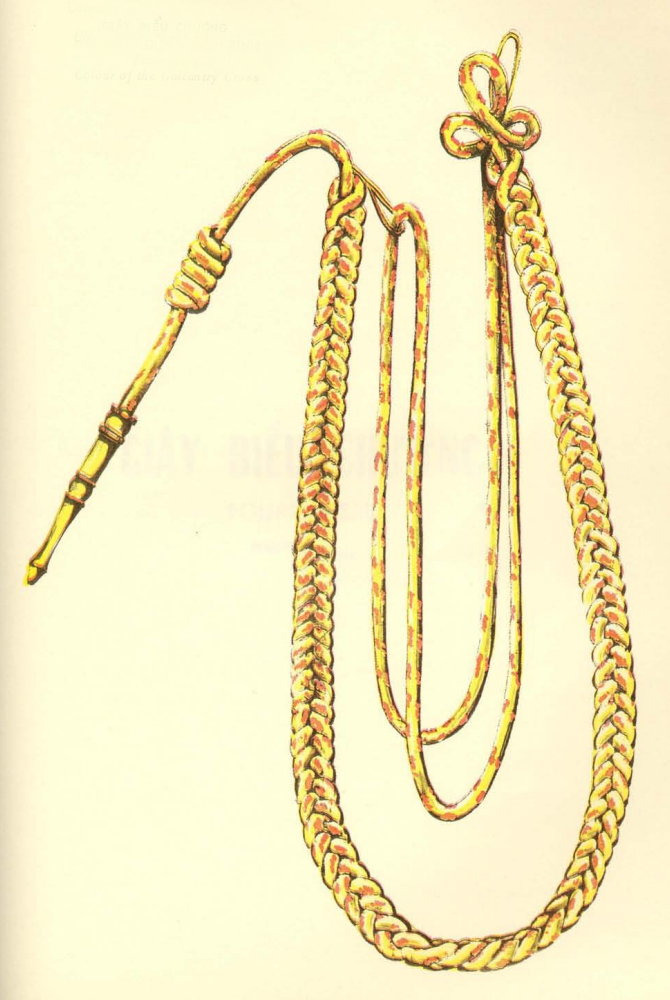
Fourragere Color of the Gallantry Cross

The Republic of Vietnam Gallantry Cross also known as the Vietnamese Gallantry Cross or Vietnam Cross of Gallantry (Vietnamese: Anh-Dũng Bội-Tinh) is a military decoration of the former Government of South Vietnam (Republic of Vietnam). The medal was created on August 15, 1950, and was awarded to military personnel, civilians, and Armed Forces units and organizations in recognition of deeds of valor or heroic conduct while in combat with the enemy.

Individuals who received the medal, ribbon, and a citation were personally cited at the Armed Forces, Corps, Division, Brigade or Regiment level. The Republic of Vietnam authorized members of units and organizations that were cited, to wear the Gallantry Cross Unit Citation Emblem with Palm and Frame (no medal was authorized).

== Medal ==
The medal is gold in color, and 35 mm wide. It consists of a Celtic cross with two crossed swords between the arms. The cross is superimposed over a wreath. The center of the cross contains a disc with the outline of the country of Vietnam between two palm branches joined at the bottom. A scroll is on top of the map and is inscribed "QUOC-GIA LAO-TUONG" (Reward of the State).

The suspension ribbon of the medal is 35 mm wide and is made up of the following stripes: 9 mm of Old Glory Red; 17 mm center stripe in Golden Yellow. The center stripe has sixteen strands of Old Glory Red; and 9 mm of Old Glory Red.

=== Degrees ===
The Republic of Vietnam Gallantry Cross was awarded in four degrees, with a basic medal followed by higher degrees which were the equivalent of personal citations on an organizational level (also known as having been "mentioned in dispatches"). The degrees of the Gallantry Cross are as follows:

- Gallantry Cross with Palm: cited at the Armed Forces level
- Gallantry Cross with Gold Star: cited at the Corps level
- Gallantry Cross with Silver Star: cited at the Division level
- Gallantry Cross with Bronze Star: cited at the Regiment or Brigade level

=== Ribbon devices ===
The devices to the Gallantry Cross are not worn simultaneously but instead are upgraded to the next higher device which would replace the previous device for wear on the decoration.

U.S. Marine Corps uniform regulations in 2003 state the recipient should wear only one Gallantry Cross award (medal or ribbon bar) regardless of the number received. For multiple awards, wear as many authorized devices as will fit on one medal suspension ribbon or ribbon bar. Wear the devices for subsequent awards in order of seniority from the wearer's right. The first palm is 1 7/16 inches on the suspension ribbon or 6/8 inch on the service ribbon. Subsequent palms are 6/8 inch on the suspension ribbon or 3/8 inch on the service ribbon. Stars are 3/8 inch.

=== Service versions ===
The Gallantry Cross was awarded to members of all military branches, as well as service members of foreign and allied militaries. The similarly named decorations were the Air Gallantry Cross and Navy Gallantry Cross. These decorations were awarded under a different authority, with different criteria, and were considered separate decorations.

== Unit award ==
The Unit Citation Emblem of the colors of the Gallantry Cross is awarded to personnel in the South Vietnamese military and Allied military units that have been cited and presented a decoration which is prescribed to be awarded on a collective basis.

Known as the Vietnam Gallantry Cross Unit Citation with Palm (Republic of Vietnam Gallantry Cross with Palm and Frame Unit Citation), the Unit Citation Emblem in the colors of the Gallantry Cross with Palm, was created on January 20, 1968, and was issued with the Gallantry Cross ribbon bar with a 5/32 by 9/16 inch bronze palm and a gold frame. The former South Vietnamese military awarded the Gallantry Cross to specific military units that distinguished themselves to the same level as would be required for the individual award. Regulations for the issuance of the Vietnam Gallantry Cross permit the wearing of both the individual and unit award simultaneously since both are considered separate awards. The Gallantry Cross was awarded to every Allied nation which provided support to South Vietnam. The Gallantry Cross became the most commonly awarded Vietnamese decoration to foreigners, second only to the Republic of Vietnam Campaign Medal.

=== Fourragere ===
The South Vietnamese military Fourragere in the colors of the Gallantry Cross represented a military unit cited two times. It was a brilliant golden-yellow, with red intermixed. Department of the Army message 111030Z from April 1974, established the policy that only one emblem for a unit award was authorized to be worn at a time. This change resulted in the fourragere being no longer authorized for wear, as it was representative of multiple awards.

=== U.S. authorization ===
Republic of Vietnam Gallantry Cross Unit Citation:

U.S. Department of Defense:
U.S. Military Assistance Command Vietnam (MACV) and its subordinate units, 8 Feb 1962 to 28 Mar 1973
U.S. Army and its subordinate units, 20 July 1965 to 28 Mar 1973
This permits all personnel who served in Vietnam to wear the RVN Gallantry Cross unit citation.

Republic of Vietnam Meritorious Unit Citation (Gallantry Cross color with Palm and Frame); RVN Meritorious Unit Citation (Gallantry Cross)

U.S. Navy and Marine Corps: In addition to specific ships/units, all personnel who served "in country" Vietnam, 8 February 1962 to 28 March 1973.

== United States acceptance ==
The United States military began authorizing the Republic of Vietnam Gallantry Cross in March 1968 with retroactive presentation of the decoration to 1961. In 1974, Army General Order Number 8 confirmed eligibility for the Republic of Vietnam Gallantry Cross with Palm and Frame Unit Citation to every military unit of the United States Army which had served under the Military Assistance Command from 1961 to 1974, however, orders, specific as to dates and units, do exist for specific Army commands as well as for members of other services not affected by the Army General Order.

=== Award requests ===
The National Personnel Records Center-NPRC (or veteran's service branch), is the U.S. federal agency that generally takes and responds to retroactive award requests from U.S. Army veterans (and other Vietnam veterans) and or updating their personal military records to show the Republic of Vietnam Gallantry Cross (RVN) and or unit award credit, either per Army General Order 8 or per unit specific awards. The full medal and or unit citation award are both considered foreign military awards and are not issued to Vietnam veterans (or their next of kin) by the NPRC (or any of the United States military services). Once requested (USN-USMC name of the unit award must be used by those veterans) and authorized, the veteran (or next of kin) will be notified by mail to purchase the award(s) at most U.S. military installations, military clothing sales or private military insignia and Internet dealers.

Australia Republic of Vietnam Cross of Gallantry with Palm Unit Citation Republic of Vietnam Cross of Gallantry with Palm Unit Citation Australian Defence Force members who served during the Vietnam war have been recognised with the Republic of Vietnam Cross of Gallantry with Palm Unit Citation (the Citation).

The Citation was awarded by the former Government of the Republic of Vietnam (South Vietnam) to specific military units that distinguished themselves in battle. The Governor-General has formally approved the awarding of the Citation to identified Australian military units in recognition of their service during the Vietnam war.

Eligibility To be eligible for the Citation, Navy and Air Force members must have served in Vietnam under the operational control of United States Military Assistance Command Vietnam posted to one of the following units, during the eligible dates:

Navy Clearance Diving Team Three from 5 February 1967 to 5 May 1971 RAN Helicopter Flight Vietnam from 16 October 1967 to 8 June 1971 RAN personnel in 9 Squadron from February 1968 to April 1969 (8 personnel) Air Force RAAF Transport Flight Vietnam/35 Squadron from August 1964 to February 1972 9 Squadron from June 1966 to December 1971 2 Squadron from 19 April 1967 to 15 July 1971 Base Support Flight Vietnam from 8 February 1962 to 28 March 1973 Number 1 Operational Support Unit from 8 February 1962 to 28 March 1973 Army The Governor-General has previously approved the following Army units to wear the insignia of the Citation for their service in Vietnam.

Australian Army Training Team Vietnam from 1 July 1962 to 31 October 1971 1RAR - Eligible personnel must have served in Vietnam under command of 173rd Airborne Brigade during 5 May 1965 to 31 May 1966 in one of the following units, within the eligible dates: 1st Battalion, The Royal Australian Regiment from 25 May 1965 to 31 May 1966 1st Armoured Personnel Carrier Troop RAAC from 15 June 1965 to 31 March 1966 105th Field Battery, RAA from 14 September 1965 to 31 May 1966 3rd Field Troop, RAE from 14 September 1965 to 31 March 1966 161st Reconnaissance Flight, AAAVN from 14 September 1965 to 31 May 1966 1st Australian Logistic Support Company from 25 May 1965 to 31 March 1966 Battery Section, 4th Field Regiment Light Aid Detachment RAEME (and redesignated in country to 105th Field Battery Section, 12th Field Regiment Light Aid Detachment RAEME) from 14 September 1965 to 31 March 1966 547 Signal Troop from 13 June 1966 to 23 December 1971 Strength of D Company 6RAR in Vietnam on 18 August 1966 8RAR from 28 November 1969 to 24 October 1970 Wearing The Republic of Vietnam Cross of Gallantry with Palm Unit Citation is a singular device.

Individuals are not eligible to wear the Citation device until they have been formally approved to do so through the application process.

Approval to wear the Citation does not give a person the authority to wear the Republic of Vietnam Cross of Gallantry. This is an individual decoration that was awarded to a number of Australians by the Government of the Republic of Vietnam in recognition of their individual acts of gallantry.

=== Application ===
Individuals who believe they could be eligible are asked to submit an application. Family members of deceased Australian Defence Force members who may be eligible are asked to submit an application.

==== Exchange ====
The palm on the Citation is bronze, rather than gold, and previously issued citation devices are incorrect. Personnel wishing to obtain the bronze palm device should return their existing device for replacement. Ensure full name, service number, address and contact details are included with the returned device. The mailing address is:

Directorate of Honours and Awards Exchange Citations PO BOX 7952 CANBERRA BC ACT 2610

== Notable recipients ==
- Peter Badcoe, Australian recipient of the Victoria Cross, awarded the Gallantry Cross with Palm
- Nathan D. Baxter, the 10th bishop of the Episcopal Diocese of Central Pennsylvania
- John Beal (then USMC sergeant), film and television composer, awarded the RVN Gallantry Cross with palm
- Frank J. Breth, USMC Brigadier General, former Director of Marine Intel awarded the RVN Gallantry Cross with silver star
- Frederic J. Brown III, two awards (one with silver star, one with bronze star)
- David Christian, two awards
- George R. Christmas, USMC Lieutenant General, awarded the RVN Gallantry Cross with palm
- Jeremiah Denton, USN Commander (later Rear Admiral), POW who famously communicated via blinking Morse Code during a staged interview by his North Vietnamese captors, Later U.S. Senator from Alabama, awarded the RVN Gallantry Cross with palm
- R. Lee Ermey (former USMC gunnery sergeant), actor, awarded the RVN Gallantry Cross with palm
- David Hackworth, seven awards
- Chuck Hagel (former infantry sergeant), former United States Secretary of Defense, awarded the RVN Gallantry Cross
- Jack Howard Jacobs ( Congressional Medal of Honor recipient)
- Richard Marcinko retired USN Commander, the first commanding officer of SEAL Team Six and Red Cell, awarded the RVN Gallantry Cross with Silver Star
- Robert L. Howard, U.S. Army Special Forces
- Phil Johnson, Texas Supreme Court Associate Justice
- Robert Jordan, author of the epic fantasy series The Wheel of Time, awarded two RVN Gallantry Crosses
- Robert Mueller, Director of the Federal Bureau of Investigation, awarded the RVN Gallantry Cross
- Dennis J. Murphy, USMC, later a major general and commander of the 2nd Marine Division
- John P. Murtha, former U.S. Congressman 1974–2010 (18 terms)
- John Musgrave, Marine corporal, author
- Oliver North, awarded the RVN Gallantry Cross with silver star
- Bob Parsons, founder and Executive Chairman of Godaddy
- Riley L. Pitts, was awarded RVN Gallantry Cross with palm and The Medal of Honor for his actions on October 31, 1967
- Rick Rescorla, a hero of 9/11
- Tom Ridge, former Pennsylvania Governor and former Department of Homeland Security Secretary
- Dennis Richardson, 26th Secretary of State of Oregon
- Dick Rutan, pilot and aviation pioneer
- Gregory J. Slavonic, Rear Admiral (Ret) and Assistant Secretary of the Navy, awarded RVN Gallantry Cross w/ palm
- Oliver Stone, Unit Citation
- Harvey D. Williams, U.S. Army major general
- James G. Zimmerly, former chief of legal medicine at the Armed Forces Institute of Pathology

== See also ==
- Orders, decorations, and medals of South Vietnam
- National Order of Vietnam
- Vietnam Military Merit Medal
- Vietnam Civil Actions Medal
- Vietnam Campaign Medal
- Vietnam Service Medal
- Croix de Guerre, inspiration for the Vietnamese Gallantry Cross
