= Vietnam Liberation Order =

The Liberation Order Badge is a military badge given during the Vietnam War by North Vietnam.
